= List of Southport 24 Hour Dinghy Race winners =

The Southport 24 Hour race (more commonly known as the West Lancashire Yacht Club 24 Hour Dinghy Race) is a dinghy sailing event that takes place over 24 hours, held in September, on the marine lake in Southport, Lancashire, and is hosted by West Lancs Sailing Club with assistance from neighboring Southport Sailing Club. It is one of the most famous and prestigious races in British dinghy sailing. The 2025 race will be the 55th edition of the race.

== Winners ==
Map of Southport 24 Hour Race winners (Excluding Class Association Teams)
Map of Southport 24 Hour Race winners in the North West

Southport 24 Hour Race Winners
Year	Club	Class	Laps	Ref
1967	(Merseyside) West Lancashire YC	GP14		
1968	(Merseyside) West Kirby SC			
1969	(Cambridgeshire) Cambridge University CcC			
1970	(Lancashire) Bolton SC			
1971	(Oxfordshire) Oxford University YC			
1972	(Merseyside) West Lancashire YC			
1973	(Lincolnshire) Grimsdale Cleethorpes YC			
1974	(Nottinghamshire) Nottingham University SC			
1975	(Cheshire) Northwich SC			
1976	(Lancashire) Bolton SC			
1977	(Cheshire) Winsford Flash SC			
1978	(Lancashire) Bolton SC			
1979	(Merseyside) Southport SC			
1980	(Lancashire) Bolton SC			
1981	(Tyne and Wear) Tynemouth SC			
1982	(Merseyside) Liverpool University SC			
1983	(Scotland) Monklands SC			
1984	(Merseyside) Southport SC			
1985	(Lancashire) Bolton SC			
1986	London Corinthian SC			
1987	(Lancashire) Bolton SC			
1988	(London) Sutton SC			
1989	(Lancashire) Bolton SC			
1990	(Lancashire) Bolton SC			
1991	(Cheshire) Winsford Flash SC			
1992	(Cumbria) Bassenthwhaite SC			
1993	(Lancashire) Bolton SC			
1994	(Lancashire) Bolton SC			
1995	(Lancashire) Bolton SC			
1996	(Merseyside) West Lancashire YC			
1997	(Merseyside) Blackpool & Fleetwood YC			
1998	(Merseyside) Blackpool & Fleetwood YC			
1999	(Merseyside) Blackpool & Fleetwood YC			
2000	Not held due to petrol crisis			
2001	(United Kingdom) (Surrey) British Enterprise Class Assoc. / Frensham Pond SC	Ent.		
2002	(Merseyside) West Lancashire YC			
2003	(Cumbria) Bassenthwhaite SC			
2004	(Lancashire) Bolton SC			
2005	(Lancashire) Bolton SC			
2006	(United Kingdom) British Lark Class Assoc. / Sail 4 Cancer	Lark		
2007	(Lancashire) Bolton SC			
2008	South Staffordshire SC	GP14		
2009	South Staffordshire SC	GP14		
2010	(United Kingdom) British 470 Class Assoc.			
2011	(Greater Manchester) Hollingworth Lake SC	GP14		
2012	(Greater Manchester) Hollingworth Lake SC	GP14	95	
2013	South Staffordshire SC	GP14		
2014	South Staffordshire SC	GP14		
2015	South Staffordshire SC	GP14		
2016	South Staffordshire SC	GP14		
2017	South Staffordshire SC	GP14		
2018	South Staffordshire SC	GP14		
2019	South Staffordshire SC	GP14		
2020	Not held due to COVID-19 pandemic and increased cost of hosting on WLYC			
2021	Not held due to COVID-19 pandemic and increased cost of hosting on WLYC			
2022	Not held due to COVID-19 pandemic and increased cost of hosting on WLYC			
2023	Not held due to COVID-19 pandemic and increased cost of hosting on WLYC			
2024	(Cheshire) Budworth SC	GP14	86	
2025	(United Kingdom) British Firefly Class Assoc.	Firefly	86	
2026	South Staffordshire SC	GP14	65	

== Statistics ==
=== By club ===
Multiple wins by club
Club	Wins	Years
(Lancashire) Bolton SC	15	1970, 1976, 1978, 1980, 1985, 1987, 1988, 1989, 1990, 1993, 1994, 1995, 2004, 2005, 2007
South Staffordshire SC	10	2008, 2009, 2013, 2014, 2015, 2016, 2017, 2018, 2019, 2026
(Merseyside) West Lancashire YC	4	1967, 1972, 1996, 2002
(Merseyside) Blackpool & Fleetwood YC	3	1997, 1998, 1999
(Cheshire) Winsford Flash SC	2	1977, 1991
(Merseyside) Southport SC	2	1979, 1984
(Cumbria) Bassenthwhaite SC	2	1992, 2003
(Greater Manchester) Hollingworth Lake SC	2	2011, 2012

=== By county ===
English counties listed only

Wins by club County
County	Wins	Years
Lancashire	15	1970, 1976, 1978, 1980, 1985, 1987, 1988, 1989, 1990, 1993, 1994, 1995, 2004, 2005, 2007
Merseyside	11	1967, 1968, 1972, 1979, 1982, 1984, 1996, 1997, 1998, 1999, 2002
Staffordshire	9	2008, 2009, 2013, 2014, 2015, 2016, 2017, 2018, 2019
Cheshire	4	1975, 1977, 1991, 2024
Cumbria	2	1992, 2003
Greater Manchester	2	2011, 2012
Cambridgeshire	1	1969
Oxfordshire	1	1971
Lincolnshire	1	1973
Nottinghamshire	1	1974
(Tyne and Wear) Tyne & Wear	1	1981
London	1	1986
(West Midlands (county)) West Midlands	1	1988
Surrey	1	2001
