= 2013 Southport 24 Hour Race =

Endurance dinghy sailing race in England

2013 West Lancashire Yacht Club 24-Hour Dinghy Race
Event title
- Name: 2013 West Lancashire Yacht Club 24-Hour Dinghy Race
- Edition: 45th

Event details
- Venue: West Lancashire Yacht Club
- Host club: WLYC
- Start location: Saturday 7 September 2025, 12:00
- Finish location: Sunday 8 September 2025, 12:00

Results
- (gold) Gold: (Staffordshire) South Staffs SC (A)
- (silver) Silver: (Cheshire) Budworth SC (A)
- (bronze) Bronze: (Northumberland) Derwent Reservoir SC (A)

Classes
- Class 1: GP14
- Class 2: Enterprise
- Class 3: Firefly
- Class 4: Lark

The 47th West Lancashire Yacht Club 24-Hour Dinghy Race (more commonly known as the 2013 Southport 24 Hour Race) was an endurance dinghy sailing race that took place between 7 and 8 September 2025 on the Southport Marine Lake in Southport, England, hosted by West Lancashire Sailing Club.

== Results ==
Top 40 shown

Position	Class	Club	Laps	Penalties	Avg. lap time
1	GP14	South Staffordshire SC (A)	84		17.20
2	GP14	(Cheshire) Budworth SC (A)	83		17.31
3	GP14	(Northumberland) Derwent Reservoir SC (A)	82		17.41
4	GP14	(Lancashire) Bolton SC (A)	81		17.51
5	GP14	(Birmingham) Midland SC	81		17.56
6	GP14	(Merseyside) West Lancashire YC (GP14)	81		17.57
7	Enterprise	(Merseyside) Pilkington SC	80		18
8	Enterprise	(Merseyside) West Lancashire YC (Ent)	80	‑0.5	18.6
9	GP14	(Merseyside) Southport SC (A)	80		18.11
10	Enterprise	(Derbyshire) Ogston SC	80	‑0.25	18.15
11	Enterprise	(Cumbria) Killington SA	80	‑0.75	18.16
12	Lark	(United Kingdom) Lark Class Association	79		18.25
13	GP14	(Staffordshire) South Staffs SC (Youth)	79		18.27
14	Enterprise	West Oxfordshire SC (A)	78		18.31
15	GP14	(Cheshire) Budworth SC (B)	78		18.38
16	Enterprise	(Buckinghamshire) Emberton Park MK SC	77		18.40
17	GP14	(Birmingham) Bartley SC	78	‑0.5	18.43
18	Firefly	West Oxfordshire SC (B)	74		18.44
19	GP14	(Cumbria) Royal Windermere YC (A)	77		18.45
20	GP14	(Derbyshire) Toddbrook SC (Youth)	76		18.54
21	Enterprise	(South Yorkshire) Sheffield and Hallam Old Boys	77	‑0.25	18.54
22	GP14	(Greater Manchester) Hollingworth Lake SC	77	‑0.25	18.56
23	GP14	(Tyne and Wear) South Staffs SC (RNLI)	76		18.56
24	Enterprise	(Cheshire) Chester S. and CC	76		19
25	Lark	(Cornwall) Penzance SC	77	‑0.25	19
26	Enterprise	(Lancashire) Ulley SC	76		19
27	Enterprise	(Merseyside) Hoylake SC	76	‑0.25	195
28	GP14	(Lancashire) Bolton SC (B)	75		199
29	GP14	(Northumberland) Derwent Reservoir SC (B)	75		19.13
30	GP14	(Cheshire) Winsford Flash SC	75		19.16
31	Enterprise	(West Yorkshire) Scammonden Water SC	75	‑0.25	19.19
32	Firefly	(Merseyside) (Greater Manchester) Liverpool/Manchester University	72	‑0.5	19.28
33	Enterprise	(Wales) Red Wharf Bay S.C.	75	‑0.5	19.32
34	Firefly	(Cheshire) West Kirby S.C.	71		19.32
35	Enterprise	(Derbyshire) Toddbrook SC (A)	74		19.33
36	GP14	(Tyne and Wear) South Staffs S.C. (B)	74		19.34
37	Enterprise	(Lincolnshire) Covenham SC (A)	74	‑0.25	19.42
38	Enterprise	(Greater London) London Corinthian SC	74	‑0.25	19.46
39	Enterprise	(Greater Manchester) Etherow Country Park SC	73	‑0.25	19.48
40	GP14	(Cheshire) Budworth SC (C)	73	‑0.25	19.49
