= 2012 Southport 24 Hour Race =

46th edition of the Southport 24 Hour Race

2012 West Lancashire Yacht Club 24-Hour Dinghy Race
Event title
- Name: 2012 West Lancashire Yacht Club 24-Hour Dinghy Race
- Edition: 46th

Event details
- Venue: West Lancashire Yacht Club
- Host club: WLYC
- Start location: Saturday 15 September 2012, 12:00
- Finish location: Sunday 16 September 2012, 12:00

Results
- (gold) Gold: (Greater Manchester) Hollingworth Lake SC (A)
- (silver) Silver: (Staffordshire) South Staffs SC (A))
- (bronze) Bronze: (Cheshire) Budworth SC (A)

Classes
- Class 1: GP14
- Class 2: Enterprise
- Class 3: Lark

Locations of the 2012 Southport 12 Hour Race finishers in the top 30 (Excluding Club 2nd Teams & Soul Sailor Racing Assoc.)

The 46th West Lancashire Yacht Club 24-Hour Dinghy Race (More commonly known as the 2012 Southport 24 Hour Race) was an endurance dinghy sailing race that took place between 15 and 16 September 2024. For the second year running, the event was won by Hollingworth Lake SC.

North Western Teams at the 2012 Southport 24 Hour Race in the top 30 (Pinned in Green on the UK map)

== Result ==
Pos	Class	No.	Club	Laps Sailed	Penalty Minutes	Flight	Flight Group
1	GP14	14021	(Greater Manchester) Hollingworth Lake SC (A)	95		01	0
2	GP14	14039	(Staffordshire) South Staffs SC (A)	94	-1	02	0
3	GP14	13881	(Cheshire) Budworth SC (A)	93		03	0
4	GP14	18	(Merseyside) West Lancashire YC (A)	92	-0.25	18	1
5	GP14	7	(Merseyside) Southport SC (A)	92		07	0
6	GP14	15	(Cumbria) Royal Windermere YC (A)	92	-0.5	15	1
7	GP14	14037	(Northumberland) Derwent Reservoir SC (A)	92		08	0
8	GP14	1408	(Staffordshire) South Staffs SC (Youth)	91		21	2
9	GP14	14034	(Northumberland) Derwent Reservoir SC (A)	91		20	2
10	Ent.	22310	(Merseyside) West Lancashire YC (B)	91		05	0
11	GP14	13924	(Lancashire) Burwain SC (A)	92	-1	06	0
12	GP14	13785	(Derbyshire) Staunton Harold SC (A)	90		12	1
13	Ent.	23121	(Merseyside) Pilkington SC (A)	90		14	1
14	GP14	13709	(Lancashire) Bolton SC	89	-0.25	58	5
15	GP14	16	(Cheshire) Budworth SC (Masters)	89		16	1
16	Ent.	21889	(South Yorkshire) Ulley SC (B)	88		24	2
17	Ent.	22943	(Cumbria) Kilington SA	87		28	2
18	GP14	22	West Oxfordshire SC (B)	87	-0.25	22	2
19	GP14	31	(Greater Manchester) Hollingworth Lake SC (B)	87	-0.5	31	3
20	Ent.	23089	Soul Sailor Racing Assoc.	86		04	0
21	GP14	120	(Cheshire) Winsford Flash SC	86		34	3
22	GP14	14089	(Staffordshire) South Staffs SC (B)	86	-0.5	10	1
23	Ent.	20860	(Merseyside) Hoylake SC	85	-0.5	37	3
24	Ent.	20753	(Derbyshire) Ogston SC	85		30	3
25	Ent.	22461	(West Yorkshire) Scammonden Water SC	84	-0.5	26	2
26	Ent.	22400	(Cheshire) Chester S&CC	84		46	4
27	Ent.	17	(Surrey) Papercourt SC	84	-0.5	17	1
28	Ent.	20518	(Derbyshire) Staunton Harold SC (B)	83	-0.25	33	3
29	Ent.	22506	(Greater Manchester) Manchester University	83	-0.5	49	4
30	Ent.	20055	(Lincolnshire) Covenham SC (A)	82	-0.5	41	4
31	Ent.	22901	(Warwickshire) Midland SC (B)	81	-0.25	42	4
32	Ent.	21318	(Derbyshire) Toddbrook SC	81	-0.25	43	4
33	GP14	13760	(Cheshire) Budworth SC (C)	81	-0.25	48	4
34	Ent.	22905	(Derbyshire) Combs SC	81	-1	25	2
35	GP14	13810	(Cumbria) South Windermere SC	80	-0.75	59	6
36	GP14	14045	(Warwickshire) Midland SC (A)	79		13	1
37	Ent.	23042	Sussex YC (A)	80	-0.5	29	2
38	Ent.	2312	(Merseyside) Pilkington SC (B)	79		27	2
39	Ent.	22620	(South Yorkshire) Ulley SC (A)	79		19	1
40	GP14	13770	(Wales) Bangor University SC	79	-0.25	60	6
41	Ent.	22878	(Leicestershire) Loughborough University SC	79	-0.5	44	4
42	Ent.	21543	(Lincolnshire) Covenham SC (B)	78	-0.25	50	5
43	GP14	13952	(Cumbria) Royal Windermere YC (B)	79	-0.75	40	4
44	GP14	13767	(West Riding of Yorkshire) Dovestone SC Ladies	77	-0.25	23	2
45	Ent.	55	West Oxfordshire SC (B)	76	-0.25	55	5
46	GP14	45	(Lancashire) Burwain SC (B)	76	-0.25	45	4
47	Ent.	20264	(Merseyside) Southport SC (A)	75	-0.25	39	3
48	Ent.	18657	(West Midlands (county)) Birmingham University SC	75	-0.25	57	5
49	GP14	54	(Staffordshire) Rudyard Lake SC	74	-0.5	54	5
50	Ent.	20228	(South Yorkshire) Pennine SC	73	-0.5	32	3
51	Ent.	13518	(Scotland) Strathclyde University	71		35	3
52	Ent.	22921	(South Yorkshire) Rotherham SC	72	-0.5	56	5
53	Ent.	22397	(Greater Manchester) Etherow Country Park SC	71	-0.25	51	5
54	Lark	1029	Sussex YC (Youth)	71		36	3
55	Ent.	690	(Merseyside) Pilkington SC (C)	69		47	4
56	Ent.	2825	(Cumbria) Sedbergh School	67		52	5
57	Ent.	18974	(Lancashire) Lancaster University SC	65	-0.25	53	5
