= 1967 Southport 24 Hour Race =

Endurance dinghy sailing race in England

1967 West Lancashire Yacht Club 24-Hour Dinghy Race
Event title
- Name: 1967 West Lancashire Yacht Club 24-Hour Dinghy Race
- Edition: 1st

Event details
- Venue: West Lancashire Yacht Club
- Host club: WLYC

Results
- (gold) Gold: (Merseyside) West Lancashire Yacht Club
- (silver) Silver: (Greater Manchester) Elton Sailing Club
- (bronze) Bronze: (Derbyshire) Combs SC

Classes
- Class 1: GP14
- Class 2: Firefly
- Class 3: Enterprise

The 1967 West Lancashire Yacht Club 24-Hour Dinghy Race was the first edition of the Southport 24 Hour Race and was won by the hosting team, West Lancashire Yacht Club. The event was held to celebrate the centenary of the Borough of Southport. The classes were sailed at the event, GP14s, Fireflys, and Enterprises. 50 events started the event out of a total of 59 entries.

== Results ==
Pos	Class	Club	Average lap time
1	GP14	(Merseyside) West Lancashire YC	22:04
2	Enterprise	(Greater Manchester) Elton SC	22:13
3	GP14	(Derbyshire) Combs SC	23:13
4	Firefly	(Birmingham) Midland SC	23:13
5	Enterprise	(Cheshire) Chester SC	23:23
6	GP14	(Lancashire) Bolton SC	23:24
7	Enterprise	(West Riding of Yorkshire) West Riding SC	23:25
8	Enterprise	(Merseyside) Pilkington SC	23:29
9	GP14	(Leicestershire) Loughborough University SC	23:34
10	GP14	(Cheshire) Nantwich & Border Counties YC	23:34
11	GP14	(Greater Manchester) Manchester CA	23:37
12	Firefly	(South Yorkshire) Sheffield University SC	23:41
13	GP14	(Greater Manchester) Hollingworth Lake SC	23:43
14	GP14	(Staffordshire) South Staffs SC	23:44
15	Enterprise	(Greater Manchester) Fairfield Golf & SC	23:46
16	Firefly	(Merseyside) West Kirby SC	23:58
17	Firefly	(Cumbria) Royal Windermere YC	24:01
18	Firefly	(Merseyside) Liverpool University SC	24:02
19	Firefly	(Merseyside) Royal Mersey YC	24:02
20	Enterprise	(Merseyside) Blackpool Light Craft Club	24:07
21	Enterprise	(Tyne and Wear) Tees SC	24:08
22	Enterprise	(Wales) Nefyn SC	24:21
23	GP14	(Greater Manchester) Leigh SC	24:21
24	GP14	University College of Wales	24:22
25	GP14	(Cheshire) Fiddlers Ferry SC	24:31
26	Enterprise	(Derbyshire) Toddbrook SC	24:32
27	GP14	(Greater Manchester) Lowton SC	24:32
28	Firefly	(Greater Manchester) Manchester UYC	24:32
29	Enterprise	(Lancashire) Glasson SC	24:33
30	GP14	(Merseyside) Dee SC	24:33
31	GP14	(Merseyside) Southport SC	24:33
32	Enterprise	(Nottinghamshire) International Combustion SC	24:35
33	Enterprise	(North Riding of Yorkshire) White Rose SA	24:36
34	Enterprise	(Staffordshire) Rudyard Lake SC	24:36
35	Enterprise	(Lancashire) Delph SC	24:36
36	Enterprise	(Wales) Gresford SC	24:38
37	Enterprise	(Lancashire) Morecambe & Heysham YC	24:38
38	Firefly	(Lancashire) University of Bradford SC	24:50
39	GP14	(Lancashire) Ribble CС	24:52
40	GP14	(Merseyside) Liverpool SC	24:52
41	Firefly	(West Yorkshire) University of Leeds SC	24:55
42	Enterprise	(Merseyside) Blundellsands SC	25:08
43	GP14	(Merseyside) Blackpool & Fleetwood YC	25:20
44	Enterprise	(Greater Manchester) University of Salford SC	25:20
45	Firefly	(Merseyside) Eniversity of Edinburgh SC	25:42
46	GP14	(Wales) Merioneth YC	25:54
47	Enterprise	(Isle of Wight) Royal Victoria YC	25:57
48	GP14	West Cheshire SC	26:07
49	Enterprise	(Scotland) University of Strathclyde SC	28:09
50	GP14	(Greater Manchester) Manchester Fire Brigade SC	29:19
DNC		(West Sussex) Itchenor SC	
DNC		(Leicestershire) Leicester University SC	
DNC		(Essex) Maylandsea Bay YC	
DNC		(Wales) Rhyl Yacht Club	
DNC		(Republic of Ireland) University College of Dublin ScC	
DNC		University College of North Wales	
DNC		(Tyne and Wear) University of Newcastle upon Tyne SC	
DNC		(Merseyside) Wallasey Yacht Club	
DNC		(Scotland) Saint Andrew's University SC	
