= Combs Reservoir =

English reservoir

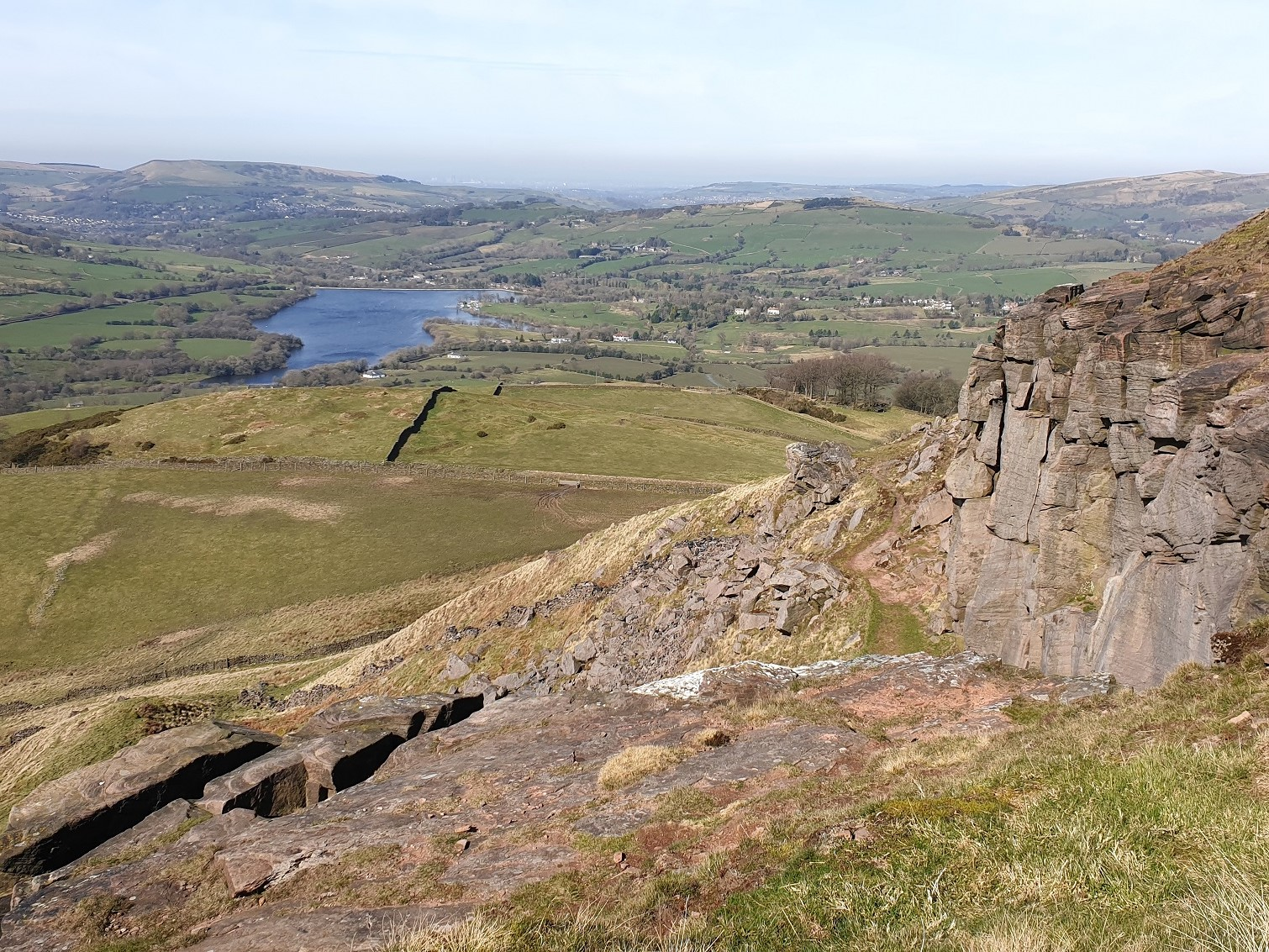

- Location within Derbyshire
- Location: Derbyshire
- Coordinates: 53.3134°N 1.9459°W
- Type: reservoir
- Primary inflows: Meverill Brook and Pyegreave Brook
- Primary outflows: Randall Carr Brook
- Basin countries: United Kingdom
- Max. length: 1 kilometre (0.6 mi)
- Max. width: 0.5 kilometres (0.3 mi)
- Water volume: 1,484,000 m^{3} (326,000,000 imp gal)

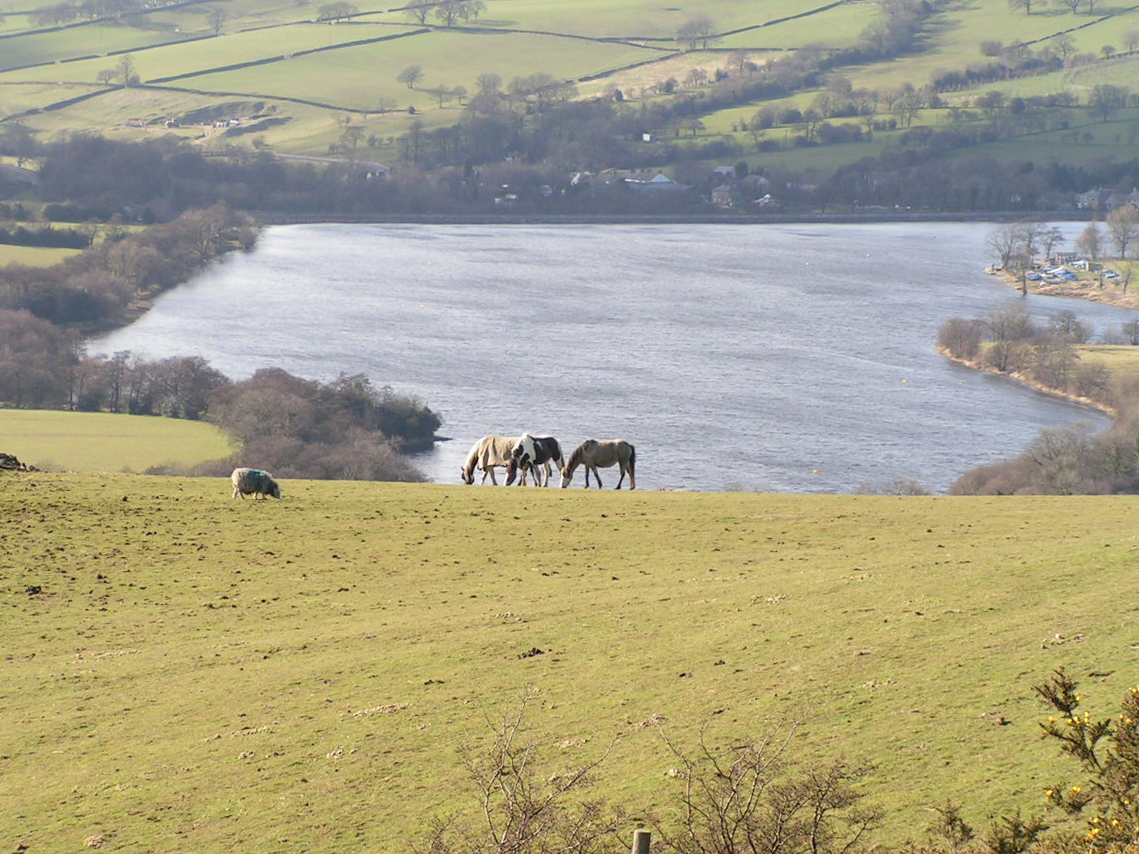
Combs Reservoir from Whitehills

Combs Reservoir is a canal-feeder reservoir in the Peak District National Park, close to Combs village in Derbyshire. The town of Chapel-en-le-Frith lies about 1 kilometre (0.62 mi) east of the reservoir.

Combs was built in 1797 as the first reservoir to feed the Peak Forest Canal (which opened in 1800) at Whaley Bridge. The canal was critical for transporting goods to and from the corn mills, cotton factories, collieries, and other local industries, as well as connecting to the Ashton Canal for the nearby limestone quarries. In 1831 the Macclesfield Canal was completed, which was connected to the Peak Forest Canal at Marple. The Toddbrook Reservoir at Whaley Bridge was built as an additional feeder reservoir and the dam at Combs Reservoir was raised between 1834 and 1840, in order to meet the demand for a greater water supply to the extended canal system. By the 1940s use of these canals for transporting industrial goods had ended. The reservoir is now owned by the Canal & River Trust.

The Buxton to Manchester railway line runs between Combs Reservoir and Combs village to the south and alongside the western shore.

The reservoir is overlooked by Eccles Pike hill from the north and from the south by the Iron Age promontory hillfort Castle Naze, at the northern end of Combs Moss. Castle Naze is a protected Scheduled monument.

Combs Reservoir is a designated Site of Special Scientific Interest (SSSI). It is particularly important for its 'ephemeral bryophyte' mosses (such as the rare Physcomitrium sphaericum) and liverworts (Ricca glauca and Fossombronia wondraczekii). The area is a rich habitat for birdlife including the great crested grebe, little ringed plover, snipe and lapwing.

== Combs Sailing Club ==
Combs Sailing Club is located on the northern side of the reservoir, where it has been located since 1952.

The club's first constitution was drafted in January 1950, with the object of the club being to "to encourage and practice the arts of sailing, racing, rowing, and paddling of small craft." Tommy Russell was the club's first commodore, and he built the first boat to sail on the reservoir, a sprog. In May 1955, the GP14 became the club class boat, and by 1959 the club had 31 registered boats from the class.

Russell would remain commodore until 1965. At the first Southport 24 Hour Race in 1967 the club finished third.

The club merged in 2026 with Toddbrook Sailing Club following the bursting of Toddbrook Reservoir in 2019, with Combs SC competing alongside Toddbrook SC at the past two Southport 24 Hour Races in 2024 and 2025 under the name of the latter, where they finished 4th and 8th respectively.
