= 2025 Southport 24 Hour Race =

Endurance dinghy sailing race in England

2025 West Lancashire Yacht Club 24-Hour Dinghy Race
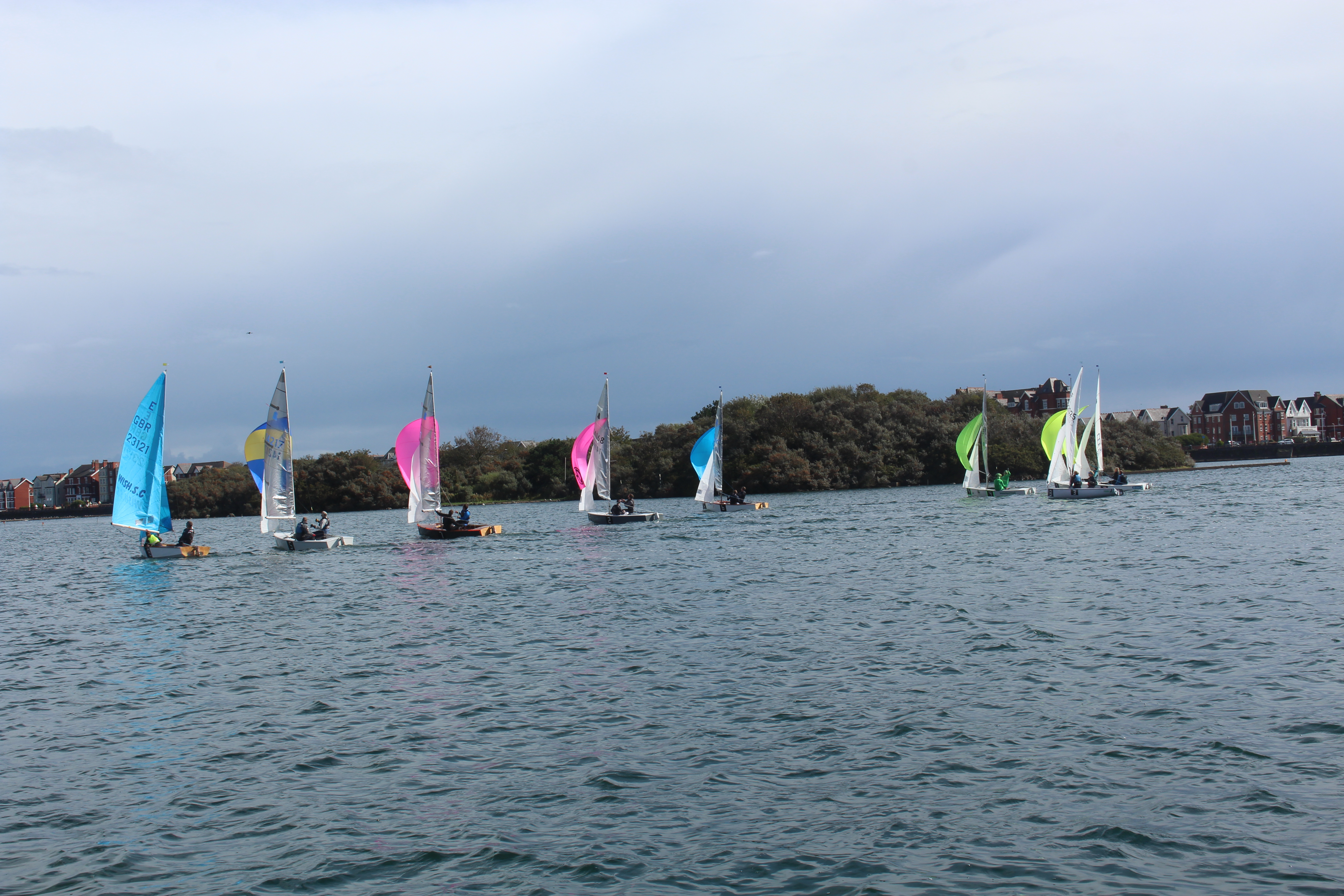
- Flight 0's start of the race

Event title
- Name: 2025 West Lancashire Yacht Club 24-Hour Dinghy Race
- Edition: 54th

Event details
- Venue: West Lancashire Yacht Club
- Host club: WLYC
- Start location: Saturday 13 September 2025, 12:00
- Finish location: Sunday 14 September 2025, 12:00

Results
- (gold) Gold: (United Kingdom) British National Firefly Association
- (silver) Silver: (Hampshire) Southampton University SC
- (bronze) Bronze: (Cheshire) Budworth SC (A)

Classes
- Class 1: GP14
- Class 2: Enterprise
- Class 3: Firefly

The 54th West Lancashire Yacht Club 24-Hour Dinghy Race (more commonly known as the 2025 Southport 24 Hour Race) was an endurance dinghy sailing race that took place between 13 and 14 September 2025 on the Southport Marine Lake in Southport, England, hosted by West Lancashire Sailing Club.

As was the case in 2024, GP14s and Enterprises were both permitted to race, and for the first time since 2019, although only one race has been held without them due to cancellations due to the COVID-19 pandemic and subsequent financial issues associated with hosting the event, the Firefly was eligible to be raced at the event.

The event was won by the British National Firefly Class Association, becoming the third class association to win the race. Southampton University placed second also in a Firefly. The previous year's champions Budworth Sailing Club (A) finished third.

== Entry list ==
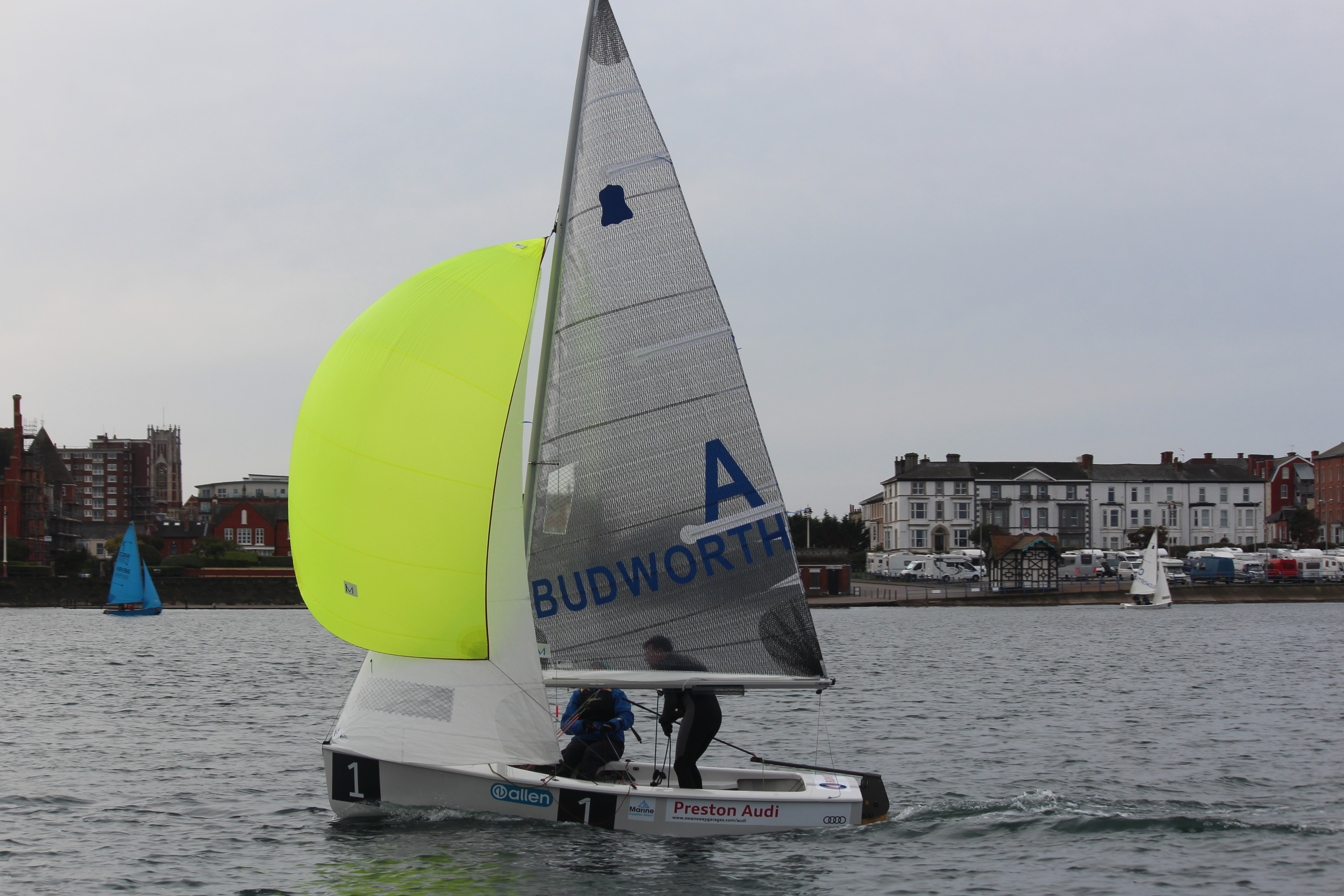
2024 event winners Budworth SC on Sunday morning of the 2025 edition of the race

The following list contains every entered boat in order of their hull number. Past winners are highlighted in bold.

Flight Number	Flight	Team Name	Class
1	0	**(Cheshire) Budworth SC (A)**	GP14
2	0	**(Staffordshire) South Staffs SC (A)**	GP14
3	0	(United Kingdom) British National Firefly Association	Firefly
4	0	(Derbyshire) Toddbrook SC (A)	GP14
5	0	**(Lancashire) Bolton SC**	GP14
6	0	(Merseyside) **West Lancashire YC (A)**	GP14
7	0	**(Greater Manchester) Hollingworth Lake SC (A)**	GP14
8	0	(Greater Manchester) Wish SC (A) Masters	Enterprise
9	0	(Cheshire) Budworth SC (B) Masters	GP14
10	1	(Gloucestershire) South Cerney SC	GP14
11	1	(Greater Manchester) Hollingworth Lake SC (B)	GP14
12	1	(Staffordshire) South Staffs SC (B)	GP14
13	1	(Staffordshire) Chase SC (A)	GP14
14	1	West Oxfordshire SC (A)	Ent.
15	1	(Derbyshire) Ogston SC (A)	Ent.
16	1	(Warwickshire) Midland SC (A)	Ent.
17	1	(West Yorkshire) Scammonden Water SC	Ent.
18	1	(United Kingdom) Neilson Active Holidays Masters	GP14
19	1	(Hampshire) Warsash SC Masters	GP14
20	2	(Dorset) Poole YC	GP14
21	2	(Oxfordshire) Banbury SC	GP14
22	2	**(Tyne and Wear) Tynemouth SC**	GP14
23	2	**(Merseyside) Southport SC**	GP14
24	2	West Oxfordshire SC (B)	Firefly
25	2	Not Listed	
26	2	(Greater Manchester) Leigh and Lowton SC (A)	GP14
27	2	(Derbyshire) Toddbrook SC (B)	Ent.
28	2	(Greater Manchester) Elton SC	Ent.
29	2	(Scotland) St Mary's Loch SC	Ent.
30	3	**(Merseyside) Blackpool & Fleetwod YC**	GP14
31	3	(Merseyside) Hoylake SC	Ent.
32	3	(Warwickshire) Draycote Water SC	Firefly
33	3	**(Cheshire) Winsford Flash SC**	GP14
34	3	(Somerset) Bath University SC (A)	Firefly
35	3	(Cheshire) Budworth SC (C)	GP14
36	3	(Leicestershire) Loughborough University SC	Firefly
37	3	(Staffordshire) Chase SC (B)	Ent.
38	3	(Tyne and Wear) Sunderland SC (A)	Ent.
39	3	(East Riding of Yorkshire) Royal Yorkshire YC	Ent.
40	4	(West Riding of Yorkshire) Dovestone SC	GP14
41	4	(Cumbria) Royal Windermere YC	GP14
42	4	(Merseyside) Crosby Marina Club	GP14
43	4	(Cumbria) South Windermere SC	GP14
44	4	(United Kingdom) BUSA (A)	Firefly
45	4	(Staffordshire) Rudyard Lake SC	GP14
46	4	(Somerset) Bath University SC (B)	Firefly
47	4	(Greater Manchester) Wish SC (B)	Ent.
48	4	(Merseyside) Sefton Sea Cadets	GP14
49	4	(Merseyside) Liverpool YC	GP14
50	5	(United Kingdom) Royal Yachting Association	Firefly
51	5	(Merseyside) West Lancashire YC (B)	GP14
52	5	(Worcestershire) Trimpley SC	GP14
53	5	(United Kingdom) BUSA (B)	Firefly
54	5	(Greater Manchester) Leigh and Lowton SC (B)	GP14
55	5	(Warwickshire) Midland SC (B)	GP14
56	5	(Derbyshire) Ogston SC (B)	Ent.
57	5	(Hampshire) Solent University SC	Ent.
58	5	(Hampshire) Southampton University SC	Firefly
59	5	(Tyne and Wear) Sunderland SC (B)	Ent.
60	5	(United Kingdom) BUSA (C)	Firefly
61	5	(Hampshire) Tudor SC	GP14
62	5	(Cheshire) Budworth SC (D) Juniors	GP14
63	5	(United Kingdom) North East and Yorkshire Youth Sailing Association	Ent.

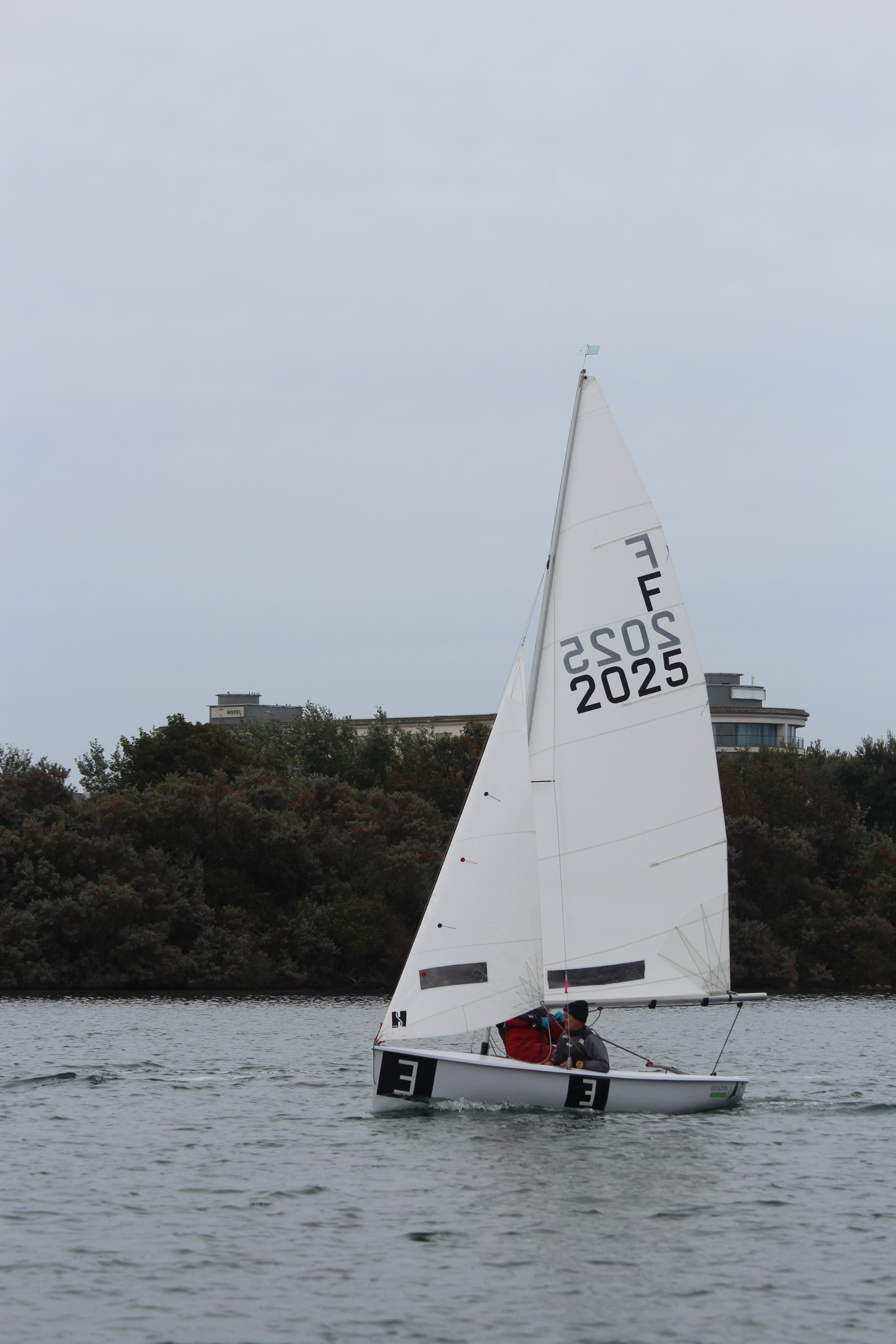
Event winners, the British National Firefly Class Association on Sunday morning

== Results ==
Final Results
Pos	Class	No.	Club	Laps Sailed	Penalty Minutes	Avg PYS Lap Time	Flight	Flight Group
1	Firefly	2025	(United Kingdom) British National Firefly Association	86	0	15:22.7	3	0
2	Firefly	4441	(Hampshire) Southampton University SC	84	0	15:37.1	58	5
3	GP14	BUDW A	(Cheshire) Budworth SC (A)	92	0	15:41.5	1	0
4	Firefly	4115	West Oxfordshire SC (B)	83	0	15:45.5	24	2
5	GP14	14168	(Staffordshire) South Staffs SC (A)	91	3	15:54.2	2	0
6	GP14	7	(Greater Manchester) Hollingworth Lake SC (A)	91	0	15:56.9	7	0
7	Firefly	36	(Leicestershire) Loughborough University SC	82	0	15:57.6	36	3
8	GP14	13733	(Derbyshire) Toddbrook SC (A)	90	0	16:01.7	4	0
9	GP14	WLYC	(Merseyside) West Lancashire YC (A)	90	3	16:04.6	6	0
10	Ent.	22619	(Derbyshire) Ogston SC (A)	86	0	16:20.8	15	1
11	Firefly	115	(Somerset) Bath University SC (A)	80	0	16:24.4	34	3
12	GP14	14217	(Lancashire) Bolton SC	88	0	16:31.5	5	0
13	Firefly	53	(United Kingdom) BUSA (B)	79	0	16:37.8	53	5
14	GP14	14199	(Staffordshire) Chase SC (A)	87	6	16:46.0	13	1
15	GP14	14288	(Cumbria) Royal Windermere YC	86	0	16:48.6	41	4
16	GP14	HLSC B	(Greater Manchester) Hollingworth Lake SC (B)	86	9	16:50.2	11	1
17	Ent.	23121	(Greater Manchester) Wish SC (A) Masters	84	12	16:59.9	8	0
18	GP14	BUDW B	(Cheshire) Budworth SC (B) Masters	85	0	17:00.8	9	0
19	GP14	13843	(Warwickshire) Midland SC (B)	85	3	17:02.4	55	5
20	GP14	13862	(Gloucestershire) South Cerney SC	85	6	17:04.2	10	1
21	GP14	13953	(Hampshire) Warsash SC Masters	84	0	17:10.4	19	1
22	Firefly	117	(Somerset) Bath University SC (B)	76	0	17:10.7	46	4
23	GP14	14050	(Greater Manchester) Leigh and Lowton SC (A)	84	0	17:12.9	26	2
24	Firefly	X2	(United Kingdom) BUSA (A)	75	0	17:24.9	44	4
25	GP14	13938	(Staffordshire) South Staffs SC (B)	83	0	17:27.3	12	1
26	GP14	14128	(Dorset) Poole YC	83	9	17:32.4	20	2
27	GP14	14002	(United Kingdom) Neilson Active Holidays Masters	81	0	17:48.8	18	1
28	Ent.	22901	(Warwickshire) Midland SC (A)	78	0	18:00.5	16	1
29	GP14	13654	(Greater Manchester) Leigh and Lowton SC (A)	80	3	18:03.3	54	5
30	GP14	13838	(Tyne and Wear) Tynemouth SC	80	0	18:07.1	22	2
31	Ent.	WOSC 1	West Oxfordshire SC (A)	77	3	18:20.1	14	1
32	Ent.	20816	(Scotland) St Mary's Loch SC	77	3	18:26.3	29	2
33	GP14	BUDW D	(Cheshire) Budworth SC (D) Juniors	78	0	18:30.7	62	5
34	Ent.	22325	(Derbyshire) Toddbrook SC (B)	76	9	18:34.7	27	2
35	GP14	SSC	(Merseyside) Southport SC	77	0	18:42.1	23	2
36	Firefly	2312	(Warwickshire) Draycote Water SC	70	0	18:43.3	32	3
37	Ent.	22917	(West Yorkshire) Scammonden Water SC	76	15	18:44.4	17	1
38	Ent.	23056	(Derbyshire) Ogston SC (B)	75	0	18:47.3	56	5
39	GP14	BUDW C	(Cheshire) Budworth SC (C)	77	21	19:01.8	35	3
40	GP14	13737	(Merseyside) Blackpool & Fleetwod YC	74	9	19:41.5	30	3
41	GP14	13395	(Oxfordshire) Banbury SC	73	3	19:50.9	21	2
42	GP14	13489	(Merseyside) Liverpool YC	73	18	19:55.1	49	4
43	Ent.	19011	(Staffordshire) Chase SC (B)	71	12	19:59.7	37	3
44	GP14	13918	(Merseyside) Crosby Marina Club	71	0	20:23.7	42	4
45	GP14	13263	(Worcestershire) Trimpley SC	71	6	20:27.7	52	5
46	GP14	91/120	(Cheshire) Winsford Flash SC	71	6	20:33.9	33	3
47	Ent.	22881	(United Kingdom) North East and Yorkshire Youth Sailing Association	68	0	20:46.0	63	5
48	Ent.	21160	(Tyne and Wear) Sunderland SC (A)	67	6	21:04.5	38	3
49	GP14	12989	(Staffordshire) Rudyard Lake SC	68	3	21:20.1	45	4
50	Ent.	23244	(Greater Manchester) Elton SC	64	6	22:12.3	28	2
51	Firefly	X5	(United Kingdom) BUSA (C)	59	21	22:26.9	60	5
52	GP14	13810	(Cumbria) South Windermere SC	64	6	22:33.6	43	4
53	GP14	13667	(West Riding of Yorkshire) Dovestone SC	64	12	22:46.7	40	4
54	GP14	13047	(Merseyside) West Lancashire YC (B)	63	3	22:50.9	51	5
55	Ent.	21103	(Greater Manchester) Wish SC (B)	60	0	23:20.7	47	4
56	GP14	13322	(Hampshire) Tudor SC	51	0	28:03.9	61	5
57	Firefly	3416	(United Kingdom) Royal Yachting Association	35	21	38:09.2	50	5
58	Ent.	20860	(Merseyside) Hoylake SC	33	0	42:23.5	31	3
59	Ent.	18196	(East Riding of Yorkshire) Royal Yorkshire YC	27	21	52:39.6	39	3
60	Ent.	22319	(Hampshire) Solent University SC	26	3	55:04.3	57	5
61	GP14	12934	(Merseyside) Sefton Sea Cadets	4	6	350:56.1	48	4
DNS	Ent.	-	(Tyne and Wear) Sunderland SC (B)	-	-	-	-	-

== 2025 Southport National Junior 12 Hour Race ==
2025 Southport National Junior 12 Hour Race
Event title
- Name: 2025 Southport National Junior 12 Hour Race

Event details
- Venue: Southport Sailing Club
- Host club: SSC
- Start location: Saturday 28 June 2025, 08:00
- Finish location: Saturday 28 June 2025, 20:00

Results
- (gold) Gold: (Cheshire) Budworth SC
- (silver) Silver: (Derbyshire) Toddbrook SC
- (bronze) Bronze: (Cheshire) Winsford Flash SC

Classes
- Class 1: GP14
- Class 2: Enterprise
- Class 3: RS Quest
- Class 4: Topper Topaz Argo

The 2025 Southport National Junior 12 Hour Race was an endurance sailing race that took place on 28 June at Southport Sailing Club, and was co-hosted by West Lancashire Yacht Club. Budworth Sailing Club would win the event after not competing in 2024.

=== Results ===
Pos	Class	Club	Laps Sailed	Penalty Minutes	Avg PYS Lap Time	Flight	Category
1	GP14	(Cheshire) Budworth SC	57	4	12:50.6	14	
2	GP14	(Derbyshire) Toddbrook SC	52	0	13:49.1	9	
3	GP14	(Cheshire) Winsford Flash	52	0	14:00.0	11	U18
4	Enterprise	(Derbyshire) Ogston Sailng Club	49	0	14:43.3	15	
5	GP14	(Greater Manchester) Wish Sailing Club	49	4	14:54.1	16	
6	Enterprise	(Merseyside) WLYC Enterprise	49	16	15:14.2	6	U18
7	GP14	(Merseyside) Southport Sailing Club	47	8	15:35.1	1	
8	Argo	(United Kingdom) CCF Mixed	47	0	15:49.2	5	U18
9	Argo	(Leicestershire) CCF Loughborough	47	0	15:53.4	3	
10	Quest	(Lancashire) Bolton School	45	4	16:23.9	10	U18
11	Argo	(United Kingdom) CCF Prior College	43	0	17:18.5	7	U18
12	Quest	(Merseyside) WLYC Quest	40	8	18:38.9	2	
13	GP14	(Staffordshire) Rudyard Lake Sailing Club	38	0	19:08.6	13	U18
14	Quest	(Merseyside) Sefton Sea Cadets	37	0	19:48.3	12	U18
15	Argo	(Dorset) CCF Bournmouth Down South	35	12	21:34.4	8	U18
16	Argo	(Tyne and Wear) CCF Newcastle	29	28	26:48.9	4	U18
