= 2024 Southport 24 Hour Race =

53rd edition of the Southport 24 Hour Race

2024 West Lancashire Yacht Club 24-Hour Dinghy Race
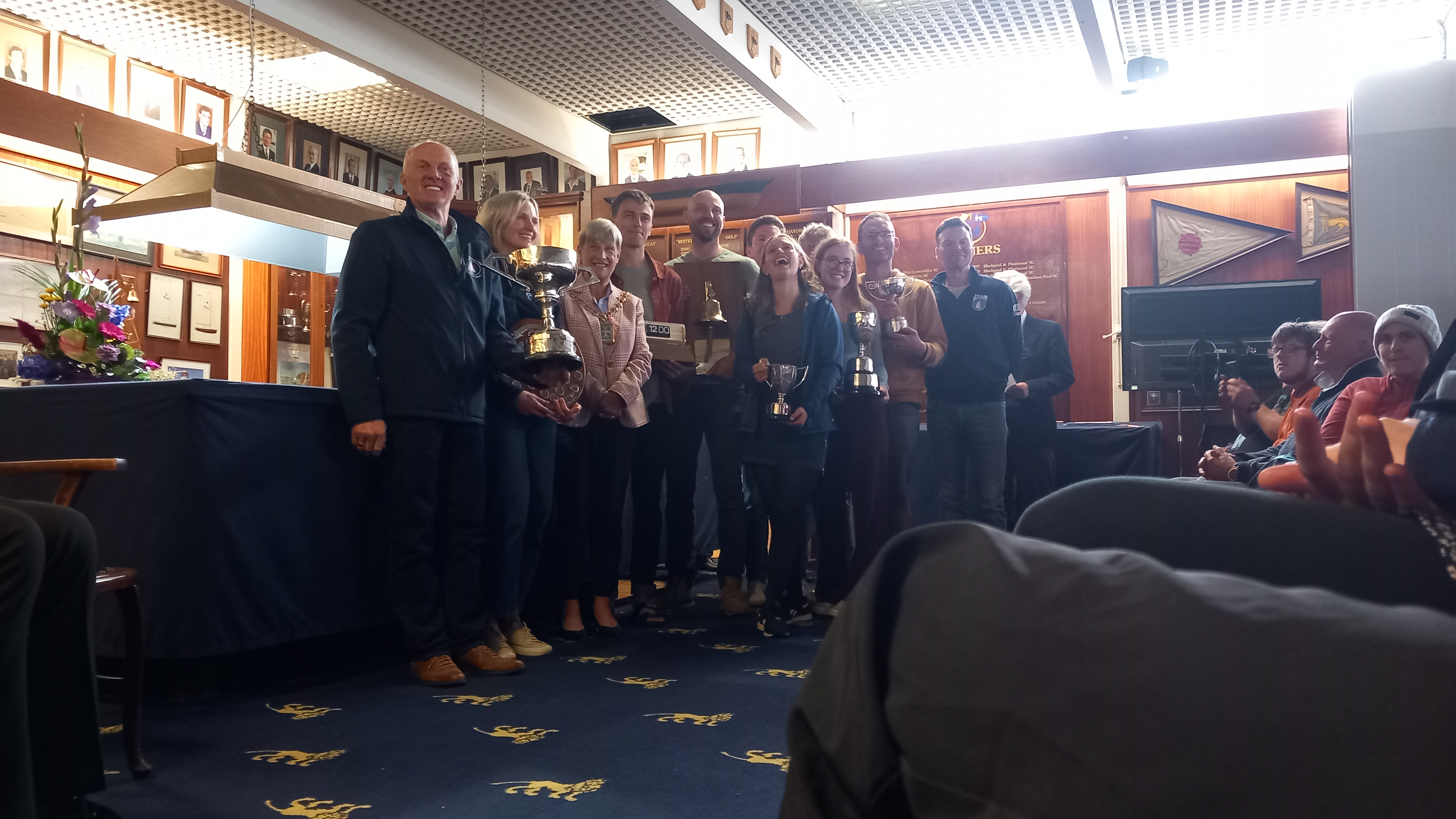
- Budworth SC (A) at prizegiving

Event title
- Name: 2024 West Lancashire Yacht Club 24-Hour Dinghy Race
- Edition: 53rd

Event details
- Venue: West Lancashire Yacht Club
- Host club: WLYC
- Start location: Saturday 21 September 2024, 12:00
- Finish location: Sunday 22 September 2024, 12:00

Results
- (gold) Gold: (Cheshire) Budworth SC (A)
- (silver) Silver: (Staffordshire) South Staffs SC (A)
- (bronze) Bronze: (Cornwall) Looe SC

Classes
- Class 1: GP14
- Class 2: Enterprise

The 53rd West Lancashire Yacht Club 24-Hour Dinghy Race (More commonly known as the 2024 Southport 24 Hour Race) was an endurance dinghy sailing race that took place between 21 and 22 September 2024. The event was sailed on Southport marine lake in Merseyside, England. The event was crowned the Royal Yachting Association's "Event Of The Year" at the Dinghy Show in March 2025.

Both Enterprises and GP14 classes were allowed to compete in the event.

The race saw many returning and new clubs and competitors, including Olympian Michael Beckett racing for Looe SC, fifteen-time winners of the event Bolton Sailing Club who finished fifth, and the winners of the previous seven Southport 24 hour races, South Staffordshire Sailing Club.

Locations of the Southport 12 Hour Race Finishers (Excluding Club 2nd Teams, Neilson Active Hollidays & Lancaster & Sheffield Hallam OB)
North Western Teams at the 2024 Southport 24 Hour Race (Pinned in Green on the UK map)

== Background ==
The 2024 edition of the race was the first since 2019, after the event was postponed due to COVID-19 in 2020 and 2021, and was then cancelled for financial reasons in 2022.

A team led by Richard Westlake, commodore of West Lanceshire Yacht Club, Southport Sailing Club and commodore of Budworth SC at the time Bill Kenyon contributed to the event being held this year.

== Entry list ==
The following list contains every entered boat in order of their hull number. Past winners are highlighted in bold.

Flight Number	Flight	Team Name	Class	Sail Number
**1**	**0**	**(Staffordshire) South Staffs SC (A)**	**GP**	**1**
2	0	(Cheshire) Budworth SC (A)	GP	BUDW A
**3**	**0**	(Merseyside) **West Lancashire YC**	**GP**	**WLYC**
4	0	(Cornwall) Looe SC	EN	32410
**5**	**0**	**(Greater Manchester) Hollingworth Lake SC**	**GP**	**HLSC**
6	0	(Staffordshire) Chase SC (A)	GP	Chase
7	0	(Staffordshire) South Staffs SC (C)	GP	14018
8	0	(Staffordshire) South Staffs SC (B)	GP	14168
9	0	West Oxfordshire SC	EN	WOSC 1
10	1	(Cheshire) Budworth SC (B)	GP	BUDW B
**11**	**1**	**(Lancashire) Bolton SC**	**GP**	**14217**
**12**	**1**	**(Merseyside) Southport SC**	**GP**	**13806**
13	1	(Greater Manchester) Wish SC (A)	EN	23121
14	1	(Greater Manchester) Leigh and Lowton SC	EN	21221
15	1	(Warwickshire) Midland SC	EN	22901
16	1	(Cumbria) Royal Windermere YC	GP	14288
**17**	**1**	**(Cheshire) Winsford Flash SC (A)**	**GP**	**120**
**18**	**1**	**(Merseyside) Blackpool & Fleetwod YC**	**GP**	**14023**
19	1	(Scotland) St Mary's Loch SC	EN	20816
20	2	(Derbyshire) Toddbrook SC (A)	GP	13733
21	2	(London) Welsh Harp SC (A)	GP	2
22	2	(Northumberland) Derwent Reservoir SC	GP	13768
23	2	(Tyne and Wear) Tynemouth SC	GP	13838
24	2	Sussex YC	EN	23042
25	2	(Gloucestershire) South Cerney SC	GP	13862
26	2	(Cheshire) Budworth SC (C)	GP	13838
27	2	(Staffordshire) Rudyard Lake SC	EN	21791
28	2	(Staffordshire) Chase SC (B)	EN	19011
29	2	(Derbyshire) Toddbrook SC (B)	EN	22325
30	3	(Hampshire) Warsash SC	GP	13953
31	3	(Dorset) Poole YC	EN	21344
32	3	(Oxfordshire) Banbury SC	GP	13395
33	3	(Merseyside) Hoylake SC	EN	20860
34	3	(Greater Manchester) Elton SC	EN	23244
35	3	(West Yorkshire) Scammonden Water SC	EN	22971
36	3	(Greater Manchester) BUSA Manchester	EN	20025
37	3	(London) Welsh Harp SC (B)	GP	9
38	3	(Merseyside) Liverpool YC	GP	13480
39	3	(Derbyshire) Ogston SC	EN	23056
40	4	(Greater Manchester) Wish SC (B)	EN	21103
41	4	(Merseyside) Crosby Marina Club	GP	13480
42	4	(Merseyside) BUSA Liverpool	EN	18729
43	4	(West Riding of Yorkshire) Dovestone SC	GP	13667
44	4	(Cheshire) Winsford Flash SC (B)	GP	1128
45	4	(Cumbria) South Windermere SC	GP	13810
46	4	(Scotland) Glasgow University SC	GP	13123
47	4	(United Kingdom) Neilson Active Holidays Masters	GP	14002
48	4	(Wales) Pwllhelli SC	GP	
49	4	(East Riding of Yorkshire) Royal Yorkshire YC	EN	18196
50	4	(Merseyside) Sefton Sea Cadets	GP	13320
51	4	(Lancashire) Lancaster & Sheffield Hallam Old Boys	EN	22863

== Race ==
=== Start to sunset ===
At 12:00pm, the first flight of boats set off in around 20 knots of wind on an overcast day, with the rest of the flights following in 1 minute intervals. All boats except two started the race, Pwllheli SC and Winsford Flash Sailing Club (B) which merged with their A team due to a lack of sailors. Hollingworth Lake (A) led after the first lap, followed by South Staffs (A), and the Enterprise of Looe SC. Hollingworth Lake (A) went on to win the BBC Radio Merseyside Cup for the fastest first two laps. At 8pm, Budworth SC (A) won their first race within the main event, as they took home the Dog Watch Trophy for the fastest two laps after 20:00 hours.

=== Sunset to sunrise ===
South Staffordshire SC won the Midnight Cup for fastest next lap after 0000 hours. Heavy winds continued throughout the night with several boats capsizing.

=== Sunrise to Finish ===
The Stanley Leach Cup for the fastest next lap after 06:00hrs was won by Looe SC, who became the first and only team to win one of a "race within race" while sailing an Enterprise. Budworth and Welsh Harp would go on to win the Coddington Cup (fastest lap next after 08:00hrs) and the Heineken Cup (fastest lap next after 10:00hrs by female helm & crew) respectively. Budworth ended up beating South Staffs by only 3.4 seconds on average per lap, as both would finish with 86 laps sailed.

== Result ==
Budworth SC A won the 53rd 24 Hour Race on the 22nd of September 2024. This was their first win of the event, despite being one of the most prominent sailing clubs in the North West of England and being winners of the 2022 RYA Club of the year. Overall split winners are denoted in bold, and class winners for each flight in italics.

Final Results
Pos	Class	No.	Club	Laps Sailed	Penalty Minutes	Avg PYS Lap Time	Flight	Flight Group
1	**GP14**	**Budw A**	**(Cheshire) Budworth SC (A)**	**86**	**0**	**16:47.4**	**2**	**0**
2	GP14	1	(Staffordshire) South Staffs SC (A)	86	5	16:50.8	1	0
3	Enterprise	23410	(Cornwall) Looe SC	83	10	17:03.2	4	0
4	**GP14**	**13733**	**(Derbyshire) Toddbrook SC (A)**	**84**	**0**	**17:10.2**	**20**	**2**
5	**GP14**	**14217**	**(Lancashire) Bolton SC**	**84**	**0**	**17:16.2**	**11**	**1**
6	GP14	WLYC	(Merseyside) West Lancashire YC	84	20	17:22.9	3	0
7	GP14	HLSC	(Greater Manchester) Hollingworth Lake SC	83	5	17:36.6	5	0
8	Enterprise	23121	(Greater Manchester) Wish SC (A)	79	0	17:49.3	13	1
9	GP14	Budw B	(Cheshire) Budworth SC (B)	82	10	17:53.0	10	1
10	GP14	13862	(Gloucestershire) South Cerney SC	81	0	17:53.5	25	2
11	GP14	2	(London) Welsh Harp SC (A)	81	0	17:53.8	21	2
12	GP14	14168	(Staffordshire) South Staffs SC (B)	81	0	17:55.6	8	0
13	GP14	Chase	(Staffordshire) Chase SC (A)	80	0	18:05.3	6	0
14	Enterprise	WOSC 1	West Oxfordshire SC	78	0	18:12.0	9	0
15	**Enterprise**	**23056**	**(Derbyshire) Ogston SC**	**77**	**5**	**18:21.4**	**39**	**3**
16	Enterprise	22901	(Warwickshire) Midland SC	77	0	18:24.8	15	1
17	Enterprise	22971	(West Yorkshire) Scammonden Water SC	77	5	18:28.5	35	3
18	**GP14**	**14002**	**(United Kingdom) Neilson Active Holidays Masters**	**78**	**0**	**18:34.8**	**47**	**4**
19	GP14	13953	(Hampshire) Warsash SC	78	0	18:37.7	30	3
20	Enterprise	21344	(Dorset) Poole YC	76	10	18:42.4	31	3
21	GP14	13395	(Oxfordshire) Banbury SC	77	0	18:43.3	32	3
22	GP14	13838	(Tyne and Wear) Tynemouth SC	77	0	18:46.4	23	2
23	GP14	13806	(Merseyside) Southport SC	77	0	18:47.6	12	1
24	GP14	14018	(Staffordshire) South Staffs SC (C)	77	0	18:47.7	7	0
25	Enterprise	22863	(Lancashire) Lancaster & Sheffield Hallam OB	74	0	18:57.3	51	4
26	Enterprise	23221	(Greater Manchester) Leigh and Lowton SC	75	10	18:59.7	14	1
27	Enterprise	22325	(Derbyshire) Toddbrook SC (B)	75	5	19:00.6	29	2
28	Enterprise	23244	(Greater Manchester) Elton SC	74	5	19:09.7	34	3
29	Enterprise	20816	(Scotland) St Mary's Loch SC	73	0	19:15.5	19	1
30	GP14	14023	(Merseyside) Blackpool & Fleetwod YC	74	0	19:36.5	18	1
31	Enterprise	20860	(Merseyside) Hoylake SC	73	20	19:38.8	33	3
32	GP14	9	(London) Welsh Harp SC (B)	74	10	19:47.3	37	3
33	GP14	120	(Cheshire) Winsford Flash SC (A)	73	15	20:06.7	17	1
34	GP14	13768	(Northumberland) Derwent Reservoir SC	71	0	20:19.4	22	2
35	GP14	13959	(Cheshire) Budworth SC (C)	72	15	20:23.5	26	2
36	Enterprise	18729	(Merseyside) BUSA Liverpool	69	0	20:24.4	42	4
37	Enterprise	19011	(Staffordshire) Chase SC (B)	69	20	20:37.4	28	2
38	GP14	13123	(Scotland) Glasgow University SC	70	5	20:45.2	46	4
39	Enterprise	18196	(East Riding of Yorkshire) Royal Yorkshire YC	68	5	20:54.1	49	4
40	GP14	13667	(West Riding of Yorkshire) Dovestone SC	69	0	21:03.6	43	4
41	GP14	14288	(Cumbria) Royal Windermere YC	69	5	21:06.1	16	1
42	GP14	13918	(Merseyside) Crosby Marina Club	67	0	21:31.3	41	4
43	GP14	13810	(Cumbria) South Windermere SC	66	5	21:53.0	45	4
44	Enterprise	23042	Sussex YC	65	30	22:06.8	24	2
45	Enterprise	21791	(Staffordshire) Rudyard Lake SC	65	25	22:10.5	27	2
46	Enterprise	20025	(Greater Manchester) BUSA Manchester	58	0	24:18.3	36	3
47	Enterprise	21103	(Greater Manchester) Wish SC (B)	53	0	26:24.2	40	4
48	GP14	13320	(Merseyside) Sefton Sea Cadets	30	0	49:03.6	50	4
49	GP14	13480	(Merseyside) Liverpool YC	23	0	62:19.5	38	3
DNS	GP14	1128	(Cheshire) Winsford Flash SC (B)	DNS Due to lack of sailors			44	4
DNS	GP14		(Wales) Pwllhelli SC	DNS			48	4

=== Races within race ===
Trophy	Race	Winner	Class
BBC Radio Merseyside Cup	Fastest First Two Laps	(Greater Manchester) Hollingworth Lake SC	GP14
Dog Watch Trophy	Fastest Lap next after 20:00hrs	(Cheshire) Budworth SC (A)	GP14
Midnight Cup	Fastest Lap next after Midnight	(Staffordshire) South Staffs SC (A)	GP14
Stanley Leach Cup	Fastest Lap next after 06:00hrs	(Cornwall) Looe SC	Enterprise
Coddington Cup	Fastest Lap next after 08:00hrs	(Cheshire) Budworth SC (A)	GP14
Heineken Cup	Fastest Lap next after 10:00hrs by Female Helm & Crew	(London) Welsh Harp SC (A)	GP14
