= Southport 24 Hour Race =

West Lancashire Yacht Club 24-Hour Dinghy Race
- Most recent edition or competition: 2025 Southport 24 Hour Race
- First held: 1967
- Organiser: West Lancashire Yacht Club
- Classes: GP14, Enterprise, Firefly, Formerly Lark
- Start: Saturday, 12:00
- Finish: Sunday, 12:00
- Length: 24 Hours

The West Lancashire Yacht Club 24 Hour Dinghy Race, more commonly known as the Southport 24 Hour Race, is a national sailing endurance race for the GP14, Enterprise and Firefly (formerly including the Lark class) held in Southport, Merseyside, England. The event is organised by the West Lancashire Yacht Club.

Entries are invited from recognised clubs, class associations as well as university sailing teams.

== History ==
The race had a long history, dating back to 1967, and had always been held in September. The race was not sailed in the year 2000 due to the fuel crisis, and again in 2020 until 2023 due to the COVID-19 pandemic as well as the high cost of organising the event. An early race in the mid 1980s was stopped during the night because of the fierce weather conditions. The Club formally withdrew the race from the sailing calendar in January 2022 quoting difficulties with the organisation, with the race revived for the 2024 edition. The 2024 race brought a collaborative approach to organisation with competitors requested to share organisational roles and volunteer for on the day duties. It also reduced the dinghy entry classes to only the Enterprise and GP14. A 2025 race has been confirmed by the club, and has reintroduced the entry of the Firefly class.

The average turnout, which had stabilised in the years prior to 2020, had been between 60 and 70 boats, although the 50th anniversary race, held in 2016, attracted 82 entries. Recent entry numbers had been held up by the fact that many of the competing clubs had entered two, three or even four teams. Races in the early years had seen as many as 100 entries with a waiting list.

== Format ==
The race starts at 12 noon on the Saturday. The competing teams then raced their dinghies around the Southport Marine Lake (a man made feature containing 2 islands) for the next 24 hours, finishing at noon on Sunday. Crew changes only being allowed in a specially dedicated docking area. Most entries were made up of teams with around 12 sailors. Competitors were not permitted to sail in more than one team during the event. However, there was nothing (other than exhaustion) to prevent a crew of two from sailing the whole event in one boat; 2 people sailing non stop was successfully sailed by Adam McGovern and Chris Robinson of Hollingworth Lake Sailing Club in the 2007 race.

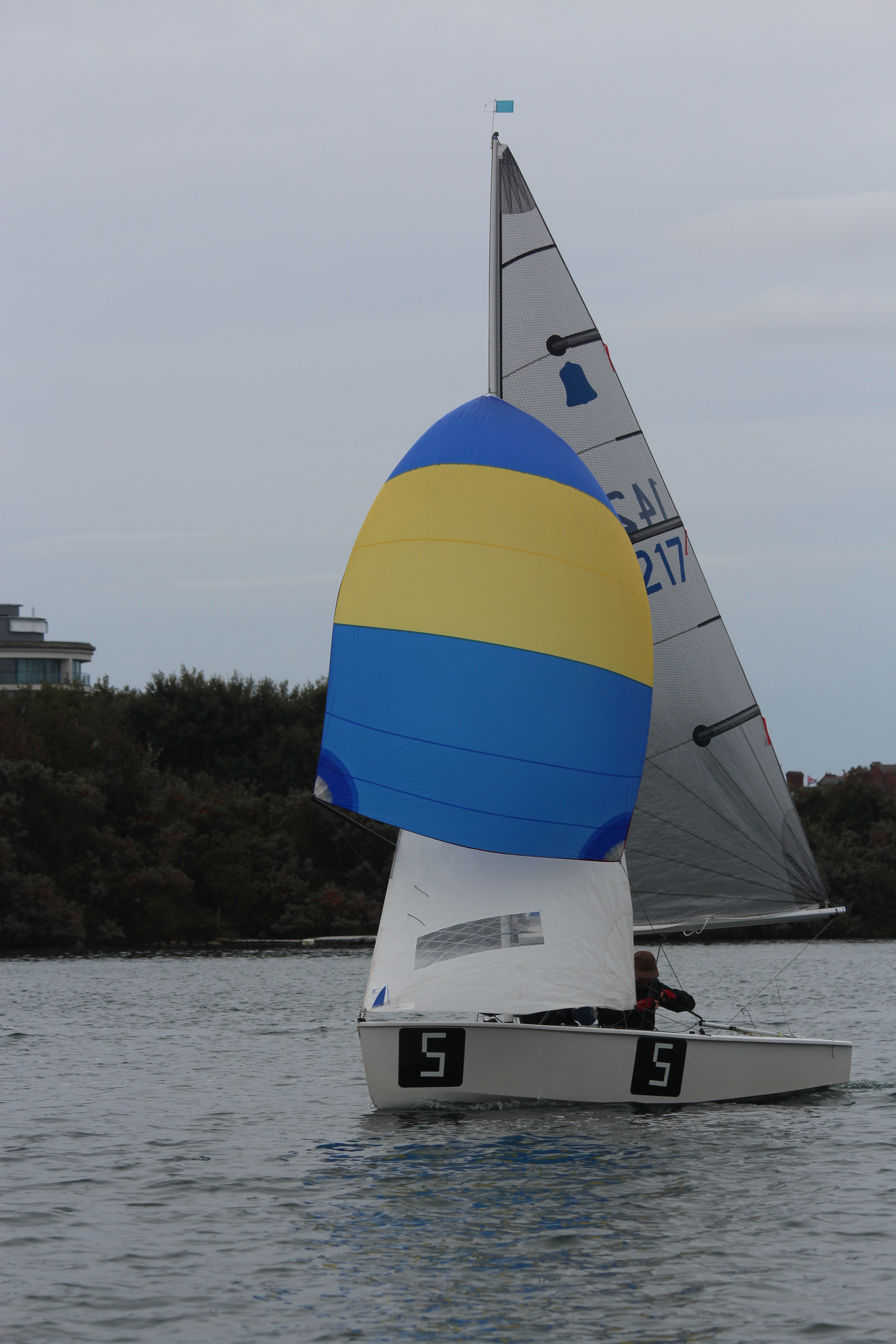
15 time event winners, Bolton SC at the 2025 24 Hour Race

== Winners ==
List of winners
Year	Winning Club
1967	(Merseyside) West Lancashire YC
1968	(Merseyside) West Kirby SC
1969	(Cambridgeshire) Cambridge University CcC
1970	(Lancashire) Bolton SC
1971	(Oxfordshire) Oxford University YC
1972	(Merseyside) West Lancashire YC
1973	(Lincolnshire) Grimsdale Cleethorpes YC
1974	(Nottinghamshire) Nottingham University SC
1975	(Cheshire) Northwich SC
1976	(Lancashire) Bolton SC
1977	(Cheshire) Winsford Flash SC
1978	(Lancashire) Bolton SC
1979	(Merseyside) Southport SC
1980	(Lancashire) Bolton SC
1981	(Tyne and Wear) Tynemouth SC
1982	(Merseyside) Liverpool University SC
1983	(Scotland) Monklands SC
1984	(Merseyside) Southport SC
1985	(Lancashire) Bolton SC
1986	London Corinthian SC
1987	(Lancashire) Bolton SC
1988	(London) Sutton SC
1989	(Lancashire) Bolton SC
1990	(Lancashire) Bolton SC
1991	(Cheshire) Winsford Flash SC
1992	(Cumbria) Bassenthwhaite SC
1993	(Lancashire) Bolton SC
1994	(Lancashire) Bolton SC
1995	(Lancashire) Bolton SC
1996	(Merseyside) West Lancashire YC
1997	(Merseyside) Blackpool & Fleetwood YC
1998	(Merseyside) Blackpool & Fleetwood YC
1999	(Merseyside) Blackpool & Fleetwood YC
2000	Not held due to petrol crisis
2001	(United Kingdom) (Surrey) British Enterprise Class Assoc. / Frensham Pond SC
2002	(Merseyside) West Lancashire YC
2003	(Cumbria) Bassenthwhaite SC
2004	(Lancashire) Bolton SC
2005	(Lancashire) Bolton SC
2006	(United Kingdom) British Lark Class Assoc. / Sail 4 Cancer
2007	(Lancashire) Bolton SC
2008	South Staffordshire SC
2009	South Staffordshire SC
2010	(United Kingdom) British 470 Class Assoc.
2011	(Greater Manchester) Hollingworth Lake SC
2012	(Greater Manchester) Hollingworth Lake SC
2013	South Staffordshire SC
2014	South Staffordshire SC
2015	South Staffordshire SC
2016	South Staffordshire SC
2017	South Staffordshire SC
2018	South Staffordshire SC
2019	South Staffordshire SC
2020-2023	Not held due to COVID-19 pandemic and increased cost of hosting
2024	(Cheshire) Budworth SC
2025	(United Kingdom) British Firefly Class Accoc.
2026	South Staffordshire SC

== Southport National Junior 12hr Race ==
The Southport National Junior 12 Hour Race is a endurance sailing race held by Southport Sailing Club, on the same lake as the 24 hour race. The event takes place often on the last weekend of June, three months before the adult event. Despite the 24 hour race allowing junior participants, the 12 hour race allows junior and youth sailors up to the age of 20 the chance to compete against their peers in an endurance race with similar rules to the 24 hour race. In 2025 it was won by Budworth Sailing Club, followed by Toddbrook Sailing Club, with Winsford Flash Sailing Club finishing third, and winning first under 18 team.
