= Sea swallow =

Sea swallow may refer to:

- the common tern, Sterna hirundo, a seabird in the family Laridae
- Glaucus atlanticus, a pelagic aeolid nudibranch
- the original name of the Firefly (dinghy)
