= Derbyshire Fire and Rescue Service =

Fire and rescue service in central England

Operational area
- Country: England
- County: Derbyshire
- Region: East Midlands

Agency overview
- Chief Fire Officer: Rob Taylor
- Motto: Making Derbyshire Safer Together

Facilities and equipment
- Stations: 31
- Engines: 40
- Aerial Ladder Platforms: 2

Website
- www.derbys-fire.gov.uk

Derbyshire Fire and Rescue Service is the statutory fire and rescue service for the county of Derbyshire, England.

== History ==
The Fire Services Act 1947 created two brigades for Derbyshire – the County Borough of Derby Fire Brigade and the Derbyshire Fire Service. In 1974, local government reorganisation led to the creation of a single organisation for the county – Derbyshire Fire Service. The word 'rescue' was added to the title in the early 1990s to reflect the changing responsibilities of the service.

== Performance ==
Every fire and rescue service in England and Wales is periodically subjected to a statutory inspection by His Majesty's Inspectorate of Constabulary and Fire & Rescue Services (HMICFRS). The inspection investigates how well the service performs in each of three areas. On a scale of outstanding, good, requires improvement and inadequate, Derbyshire Fire and Rescue Service has been rated as follows:

HMICFRS Inspection Derbyshire
Area	Rating 2018/19	Rating 2021/22	Description
Effectiveness	Good	Good	How effective is the fire and rescue service at keeping people safe and secure from fire and other risks?
Efficiency	Good	Good	How efficient is the fire and rescue service at keeping people safe and secure from fire and other risks?
People	Good	Requires improvement	How well does the fire and rescue service look after its people?

== Fire stations ==
There are 31 fire stations currently in operation with the service. New fire stations are to be built in Glossop, Matlock and New Mills, by the financial year 2024–2025 at a cost of £9 million, replacing stations aged around 50 years that are no longer fit for purpose.

== Notable incidents ==
Derbyshire Fire and Rescue service were heavily involved in the coordination and response to the near-dam collapse incident at Toddbrook Reservoir, Whaley Bridge in Derbyshire. The service operated its strategic response out of a holding area based at Buxton fire station and its operational response from a forward command post at a sports field at the side of the reservoir. On 1 August 2019, a major incident was declared and 1,500 residents were evacuated from parts of Whaley Bridge, Furness Vale and New Mills after concrete slabs on the 1969 overflow spillway were partially dislodged by high volumes of water following several days of heavy rain. The Environment Agency issued a 'danger to life' warning due to the possibility of the dam collapsing. High-volume pumps were deployed to take water from the reservoir to prevent it from overflowing and reduce pressure on the dam. An RAF Chinook helicopter dropped 400 tonnes of aggregate into the damaged area and specialist contractors added concrete grouting between the bags of ballast to bind them together to support the spillway.

Up to ninety firefighters were deployed to tackle a large scale apartment building fire inside an old converted cotton mill in the town of Glossop. Derbyshire Fire and Rescue service required the support of neighbouring fire departments from Greater Manchester and West Yorkshire to help bring the blaze under control. http://news.bbc.co.uk/1/hi/england/derbyshire/6532689.stm

== See also ==
- Fire service in the United Kingdom
- Fire apparatus
- Firefighter
- Fire engine
- List of British firefighters killed in the line of duty

== Notes ==
- Derbyshire Fire & Rescue Service (2010). "The History of Derbyshire Fire & Rescue Service", Internal Publication.
