= Randall Carr =

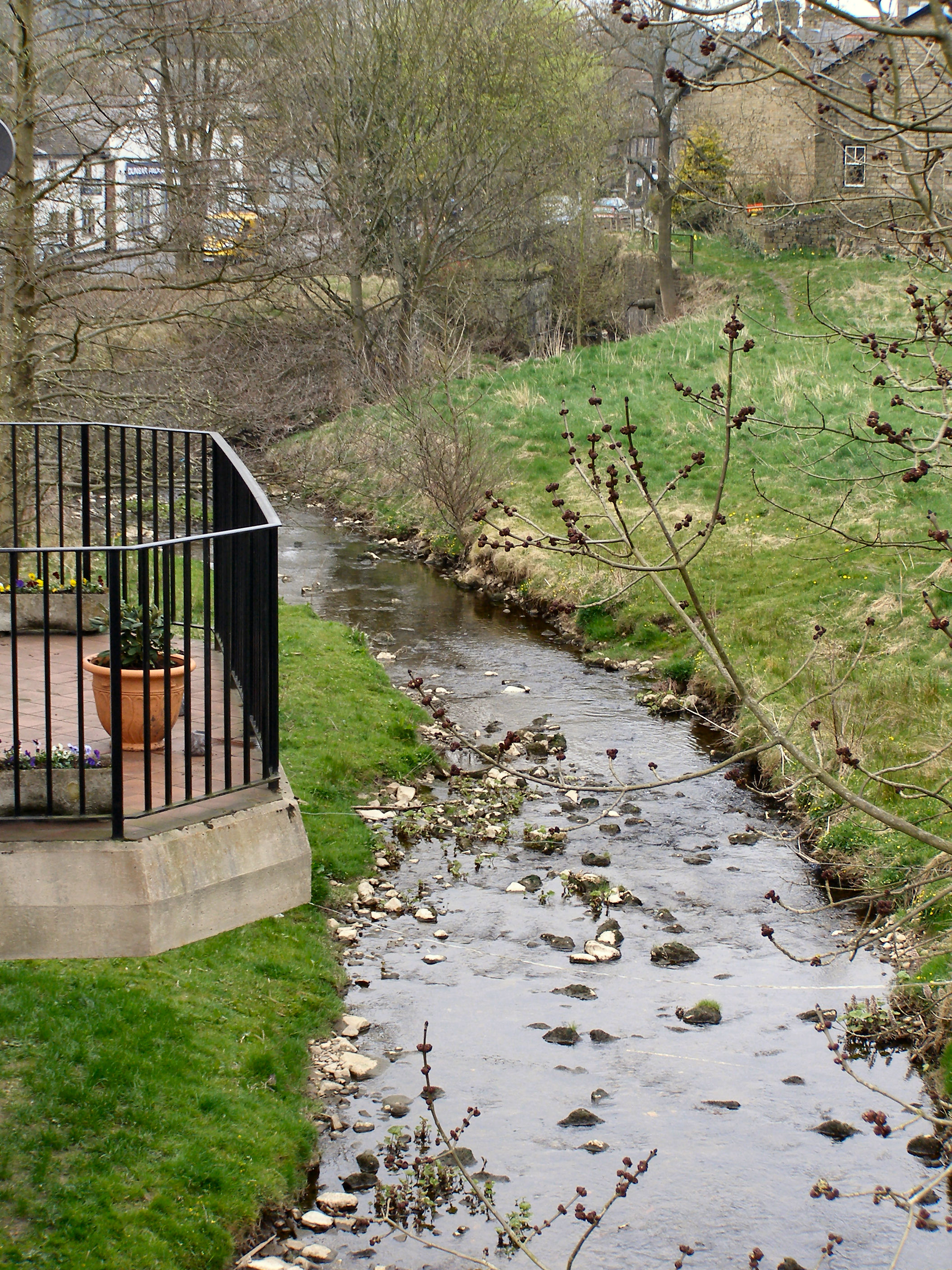

Location
- Country: England
- Counties: Derbyshire

Physical characteristics
- Source
  - location: Combs
- Mouth: River Goyt
  - location: Whaley Bridge
  - coordinates: 53°19′9.01″N 1°58′40.84″W

The Randall Carr brook is a river in Derbyshire, England. It starts at Combs and flows to Whaley Bridge where it ends in the river Goyt. Its headwaters were dammed to create Combs Reservoir which supplies the Peak Forest Canal.
