= Toddbrook Reservoir =

English reservoir

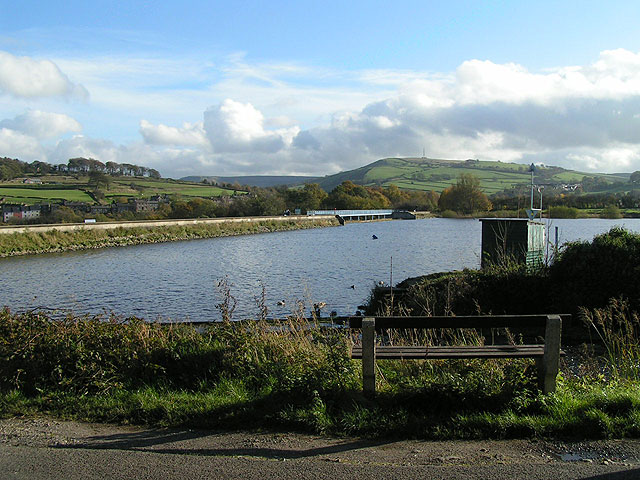
- Looking southeast towards the dam, from the northern corner

- Location within Derbyshire
- Location: High Peak, Derbyshire
- Coordinates: 53°19′30″N 1°59′37″W
- Type: reservoir
- Catchment area: 1,700 ha (4,200 acres)
- Basin countries: United Kingdom
- Surface area: 14.6 ha (36 acres)
- Max. depth: 23.8 m (78 ft)
- Water volume: 1,288,000 cubic metres (283,000,000 imp gal)
- Surface elevation: 185.69 m (609.2 ft)
- Islands: None

Toddbrook Reservoir, a feeder for the Peak Forest Canal, opened in 1838. It is above the town of Whaley Bridge in the High Peak area of Derbyshire, England. The reservoir is a Site of Special Scientific Interest (SSSI) providing habitats for herons, ducks and other animals and fish, while rare mosses and liverworts grow on its shores, particularly short-lived species that grow on seasonally exposed mud. The reservoir is used for sailing and angling. The Peak District Boundary Walk runs around the eastern end of the reservoir. The reservoir is owned by the Canal & River Trust and, like the nearby Combs Reservoir, is a feeder reservoir for the Peak Forest Canal. The feeder runs through Whaley Bridge, and with the Combs feed enters the canal system in a pool close to the transhipment shed at the Whaley Bridge canal basin.

The reservoir is fed from the Todd Brook, a stream which has a catchment area of around 1,700 hectares (4,200 acres) including the moorland on Shining Tor and farmland around Kettleshulme village. Water enters the reservoir on its north bank via a small waterfall. The first several inches of water do not flow into the reservoir but flow down the reservoir's run-off into the River Goyt. The reservoir often receives little or no inflow during periods when rainfall does not allow the level to exceed the barrier, and this often affects the reservoir's water level, particularly in the summer months.

The reservoir's dam is built from earth with a puddle clay core. The embankment is straight in plan and approximately 310 m (1,020 ft) long. The average crest level is 187.3 metres (615 ft) AOD. In August 2019, concrete panels on its spillway were dislodged after heavy rain, triggering the evacuation of parts of Whaley Bridge and the surrounding area due to the possibility of the dam collapsing.

== Dam works ==
Growth of traffic on the Peak Forest Canal meant that the water supply from Combs Reservoir proved insufficient, despite the trustees of the Macclesfield Canal allowing the transfer of water from the summit level of their Sutton Reservoir. The General Assembly of the Peak Forest Canal company approved the adoption of the site of Toddbrook Reservoir in June 1834 on the advice of Samuel Taylor, a land surveyor (a further proposed reservoir on the Hockham Brook above Chapel Milton was never completed). Negotiations for the sale of the land began in June 1834 but were not concluded until 1839. Work did not go smoothly: from the start, concerns were expressed over the geology of the site and the known existence of coal workings below the valley, and various sites were considered for the dam. John Wood drew up the first plans, though these were amended on the advice of various consultant engineers, including Robert Matthews (engineer of the Rochdale Canal) and Nicholas Brown, who had experience of building reservoirs. Contracts for the reservoir construction were awarded to William Collinge and Richard and William Walker in August 1836. Geological problems continued to dog the project, and the site of the dam was altered on the advice of William Mackenzie in 1837. As a stopgap, waters from the Todd Brook were diverted around the reservoir site and into the canal, and this solution proved so effective that consideration was even given to abandoning the reservoir project. Ultimately, however, construction continued using new plans supervised by Mackenzie and the reservoir's completion was reported in the canal committee's annual report of June 1841. The 24-metre (79 ft) dam was at the time the tallest ever built for a canal reservoir.

Consultant engineer Nicholas Brown's report of 1836 had specified a puddle trench varying from 12 feet at the brook end to 6 feet in width, but investigations in the late 20th century led to doubt as to whether it was constructed as laid out on original drawings or with more porous core material. The peak of the dam wall is supported either side by embankments with a slope of 1:2. Underneath the dam, the geology includes glacial sands and gravel, glacial till overlying mudstones, sandstones, shales and coal measures.

It was known that local coal mining had been a threat to the dam's integrity for many years, with complaints dating from 1880 that water was leaking into coal mines. After the Whaley Bridge Colliery proposed to work coal below the site, the Manchester, Sheffield and Lincolnshire Railway, who owned the canal at the time, purchased coal measures beneath the reservoir site for £8,550 after evidence of subsidence came to light.

Leakage was observed from the foot of the dam and investigated in 1931. The leak coincided with a hollow in the upstream slope of the dam which was filled in. In November 1975, low water revealed that another hollow had formed in the same area which led to regular monitoring of the dam. In 1977 it was noted that there had been 12 centimetres (4.7 in) of subsidence since 1975. The reservoir was drained and a four metre wide hole was discovered, partly filled by silt and a tree which appeared to have been drawn in by the flow of water into the hole. Between 1978 and 1980, further investigations included drilling bore holes into the affected areas. In 1981 a 1.2-metre (3 ft 11 in) diameter masonry culvert was discovered which had probably been built into the dam wall at the time of its construction to divert ground water, which can undermine a dam from below. Leaks had developed around it, as had happened to other dams where pipework or drainage had been built through a clay dam wall creating a weak spot. Repairs were made and a layer of waterproof clay was laid over the weak spot on the upstream face of the dam. The clay core was reinforced by injecting grout along a 60-metre length and the reservoir was refilled in December 1983.

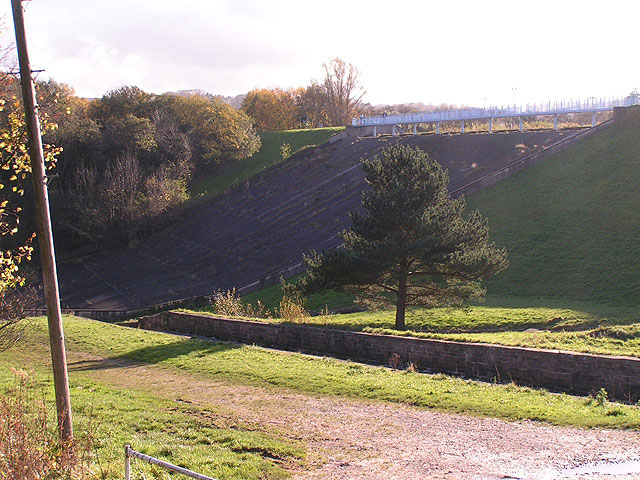
The 1969 dam wall spillway in 2005. Note channel for original spillway in foreground.

In December 1964, high rainfall resulted in damage to the dam's spillway. The water level rose to one metre above the overflow spillway at the side of the reservoir and remained high for 24 hours but did not rise above the main dam wall and the spillway prevented the water flowing over it and washing the earth embankment away. However, the high volume of water damaged the lower part of the spillway channel and escaping water started to erode the right bank at the base of the dam. The damage was repaired in 1965 but flood studies judged the spillway to be inadequate. It was noted by the Environment Agency that damage had occurred to nine other dams of similar design where the spillway delivered water to the foot of the dam.

In 1969 an additional concrete spillway was built on the downstream face of the dam along a length of 75 metres (246 ft). This new weir was formed by adding concrete capping to the earth embankment to protect it from flowing water and was set above the existing spillway so that excess water would initially overflow along the original path. In the 1980s, British Waterways carried out significant repair works to deal with leaks involving the mine shafts around the dam and a culvert was constructed under the current beach/launching area of the reservoir. A stone marker on the main beach showed its location for many years, but was relocated to the footpath opposite Toddbrook Lodge during access work for the 2009 draining.

The reservoir was partially drained again in 2009 for inspection before being fully drained for repairs in 2010. The £500,000 project entailed fish stocks being moved to other locations before repairing pitching to the wall of the dam. Other work involved repairs to the 100-year-old pipework used to feed water stored in the reservoir at a controlled rate into the Peak Forest Canal and included; clearing silt and debris from pipework inlets, removing old valves and connections to pipework, cleaning, inspecting and repairing old pipework, re-lining old pipework with a resin "sock" liner cured under pressure using ultraviolet lights, replacement of valves, testing of the new system and replacement of screens to intakes.

== 2019 incident ==
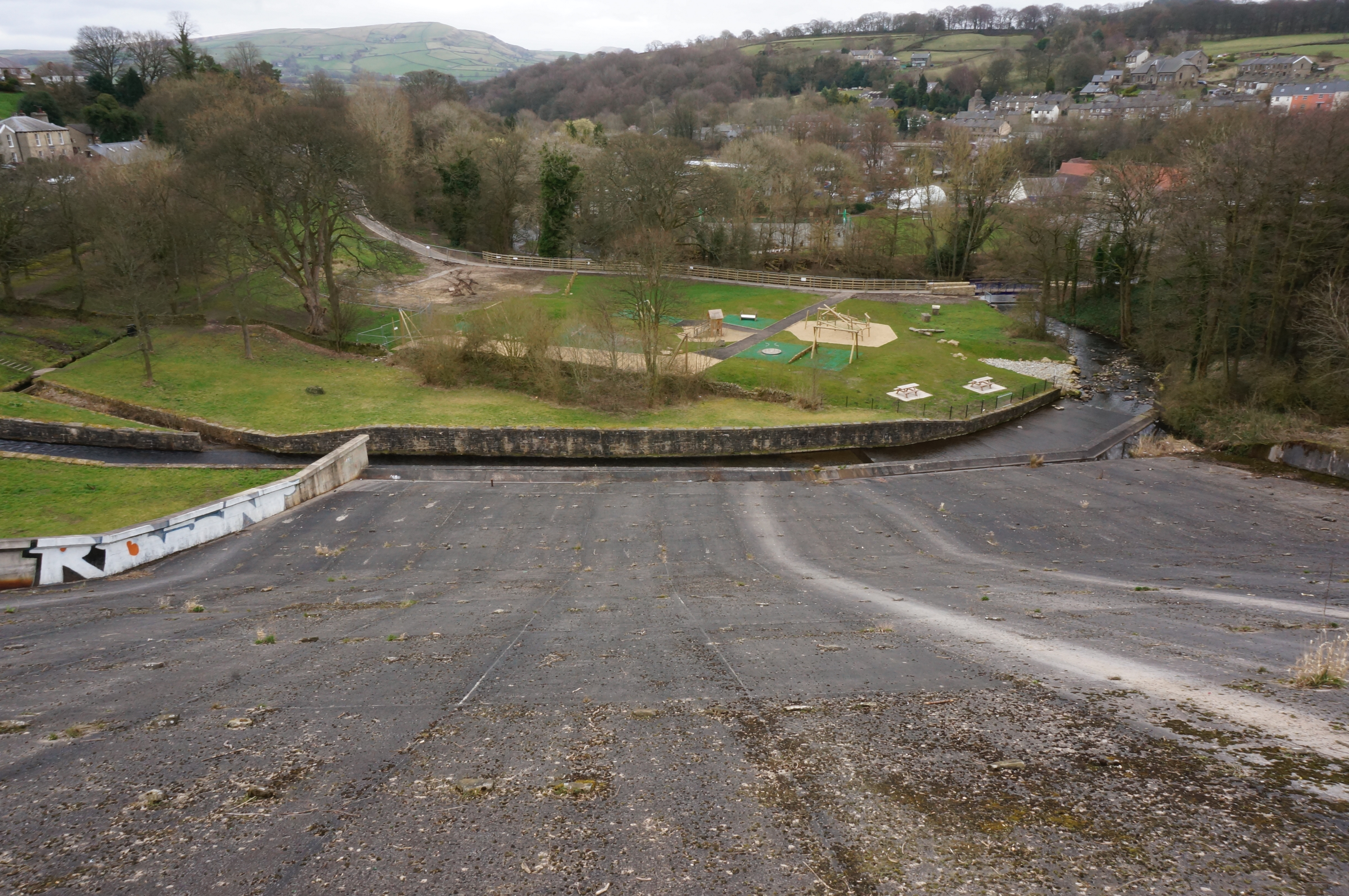
A view looking down the spillway in 2014 before the concrete slabs to the left of the picture were damaged in 2019

On 1 August 2019, a major incident was declared and 1,500 residents were evacuated from parts of Whaley Bridge, Furness Vale and New Mills after concrete slabs on the 1969 overflow spillway were partially dislodged by high volumes of water following several days of heavy rain. The Environment Agency issued a "danger to life" warning because of the possibility of the dam collapsing. High-volume pumps were deployed to take water from the reservoir to prevent it from overflowing and to reduce pressure on the dam. An RAF Chinook helicopter dropped 400 tonnes of aggregate into the damaged area and specialist contractors added concrete grouting between the bags of ballast to bind them together to support the spillway.

On 6 August, the Canal & River Trust announced that the aimed reduction in water level of 8 metres (26 ft) had been achieved and that the reservoir was only a quarter full, enabling an inspection of the damage to the structure. Fifty residents were allowed to return to their homes on the evening of 6 August and, following a final safety inspection on 7 August, Derbyshire Constabulary declared that it was safe for the rest of the residents to return.

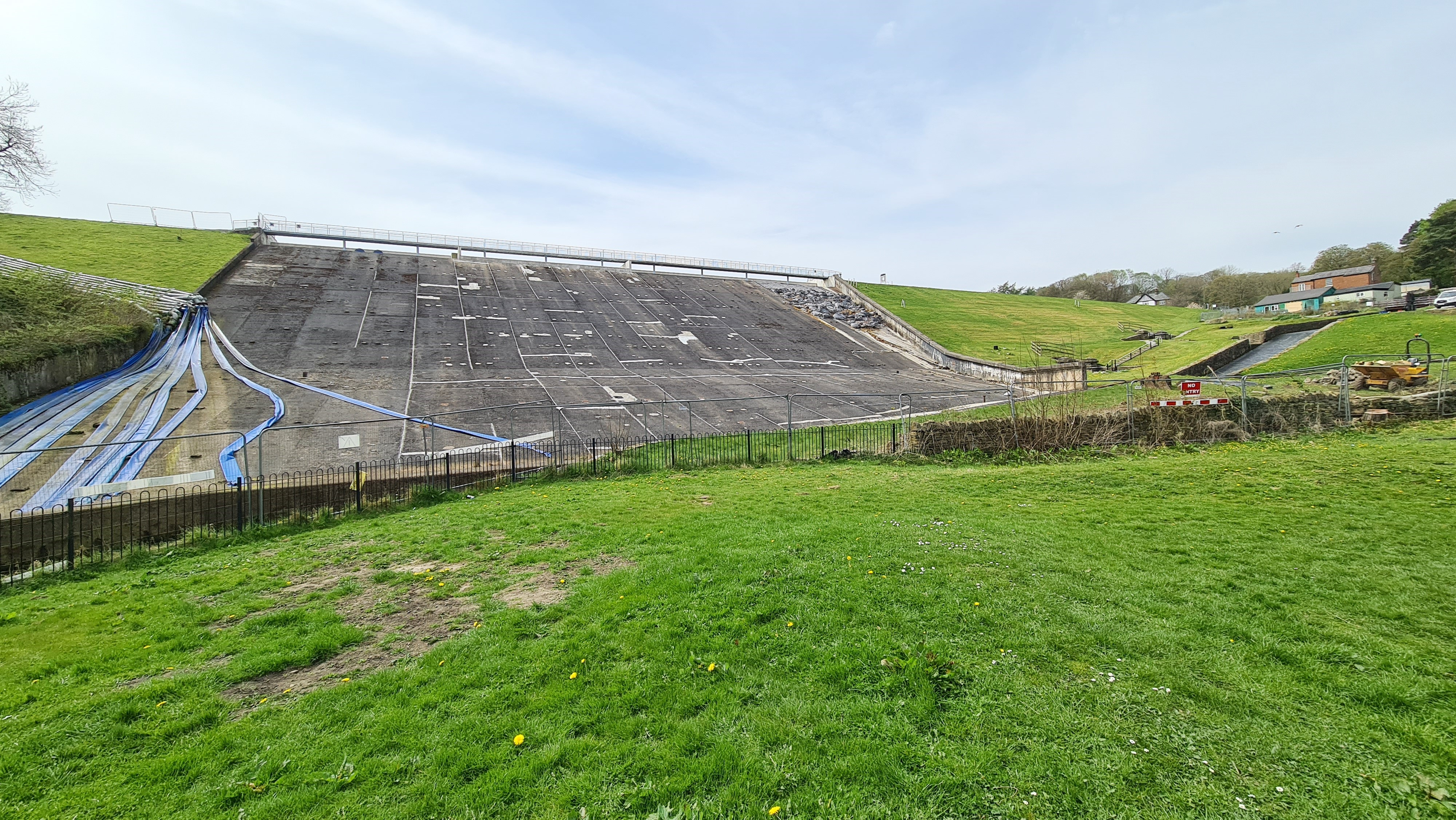
The spillway in April 2022, following the emergency works

It was reported on 7 August that a representative of the Canal & River Trust had told residents, at a meeting on 6 August, that the whole of the reservoir, including the dam, would be completely reconstructed, in a project that would span a number of years. However, in May 2021 the Trust published an engineering and environmental report indicating that only remediation work was planned. The core of the dam would be increased in height; extra means to reduce the water level in the reservoir when necessary would be provided; the failed spillways would be grassed over and replaced with a weir and new spillway at the northern end of the structure. The work will be carried out by contractors Kier Group and overseen by civil engineers Mott MacDonald. The intended start date for the work is spring 2022, for completion in summer 2024. While the work is in progress, high-volume pumps will remain on the site to manage reservoir water levels. Finally, there will be changes to the inlet from Todd Brook, at the east end of the reservoir, to improve resilience against high water levels after heavy rainfall.

In September 2019, the then Secretary of State, Theresa Villiers, commissioned a review of the incident. She appointed Professor David Balmforth to study the cause, prevention, prediction and lessons to be learnt. Professor Balmforth made 22 recommendations, which the government accepted. Balmforth was also commissioned to lead a second-stage review, with a wider remit of reservoir safety legislation and implementation. In parallel with Balmforth's review, the owners and maintainers of the dam, the Canal & River Trust, commissioned Dr Andrew Hughes to seek the reasons for the incident. His 77-page report stated that "there were indications, that an experienced reservoir engineer should have identified, of the flaws in the design and the potential for a problem to exist and develop."

Extensive £15 million repair work to the dam, expected to complete in late 2024, was undertaken after the incident. Weather and ground conditions delayed the work. As of May 2025, the expectation was that the reservoir would be refilled over the winter of 2025–26 with the final cleanup of the site being complete by mid-2026.
