= Budworth Sailing Club =

Sailing club in England

- Burgee

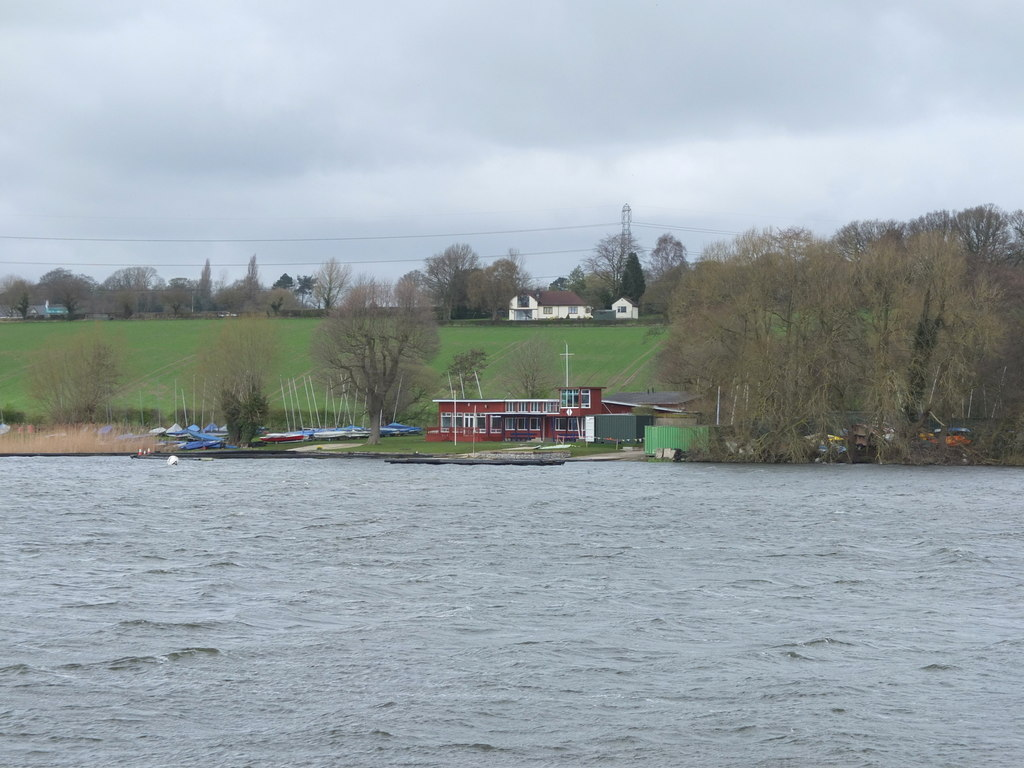
- Budworth SC clubhouse
- Founded: 1946
- Location: Budworth Mere, Cheshire
- Website: https://budworthsc.org.uk/

Budworth Sailing Club is a sailing club near Northwich, Cheshire. The club was founded in 1946. In 2022, the club was crowned RYA Club of the Year. The club sails on Budworth Mere, a 100-acre stretch of water located south west of Great Budworth and north of nearby Northwich.

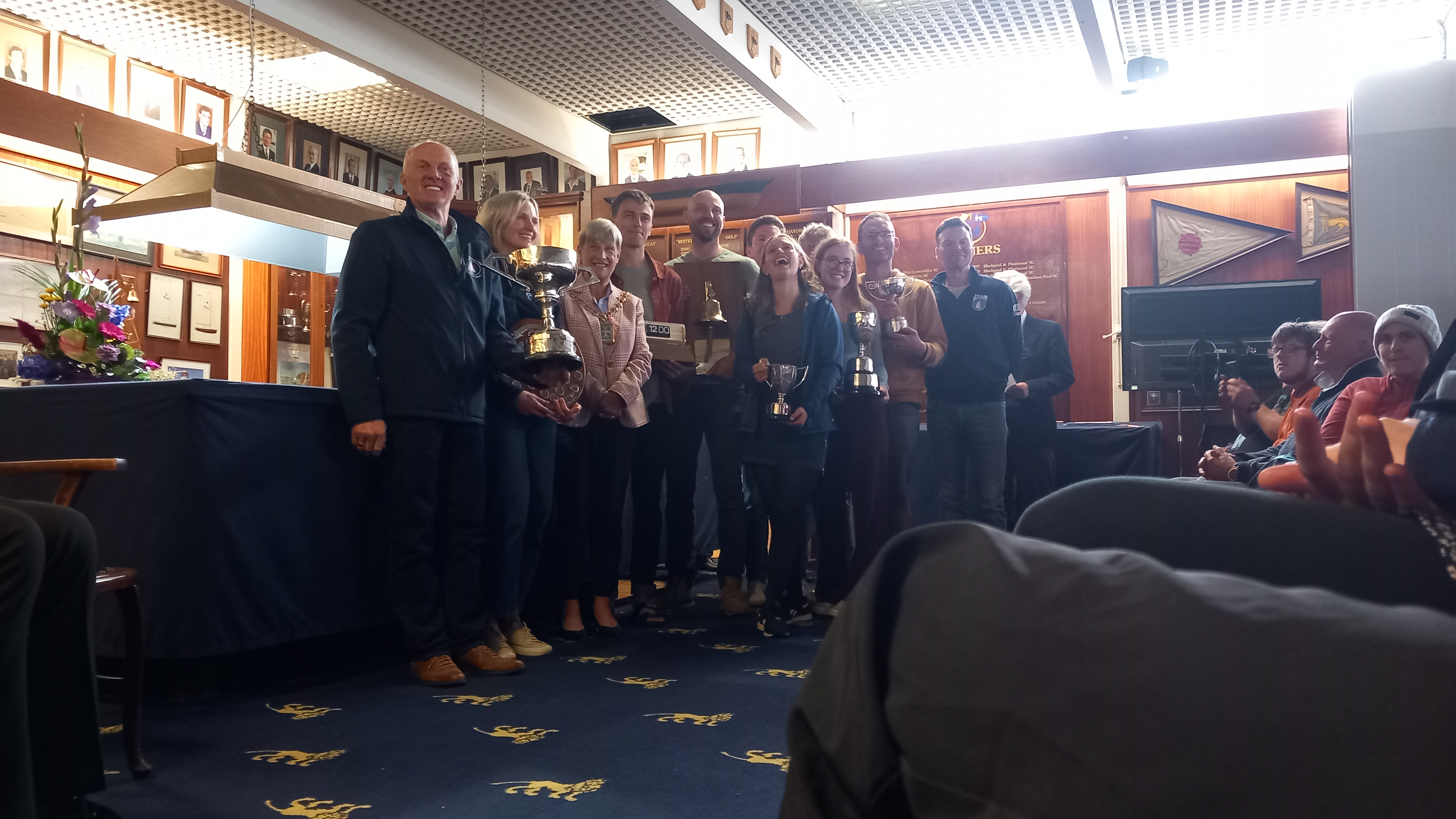
Members of Budworth SC at the 2024 Southport 24 Hour Race prizegiving

In 2024 Budworth won their first Southport 24 Hour Race, beating 9 time winners South Staffordshire Sailing Club after both boats sailed 86 laps in the race. Their junior team won the Southport National Junior 12 Hour Race in 2023 and 2025.

The club has a policy of accepting only boats of its adopted fleets. These club dinghys include GP14s, Fireflys, ILCAs and RS 200s.
