= West Lancashire Yacht Club =

- Short name: WLYC
- Founded: 1894; 131 years ago
- Location: Marine Drive, Southport, Merseyside, England
- Website: www.wlyc.org.uk

West Lancashire Yacht Club (WLYC) is a yacht club in Merseyside, England, founded in 1894. In 1999 the club was awarded the status of Volvo/RYA Champion Club, recognising the standard of training and performance of its members in sailing competitions.

== History ==
In 1898 the club accepted a new One Design Class boat, not to cost more than £35 complete. The Seabird Half Rater designed by Herbert Baggs and W. Scott Hayward. The first eight boats were built by Latham of Crossens at a cost of £34 17s 6d each. The boats were named after Seabirds and their ratings (competitive performance) were assessed at 0.5, hence the term Half Rater. The first race was sailed off the Southport Pierhead on 13 June 1899 when eight boats raced over a ten-mile course and Goshawk No.2 won.

In 1906 the Star class, designed by George Cockshott for the West Lancashire Yacht Club, and built by Lathoms of Hesketh Bank at a cost of £32 each. They raced successfully at Southport until 1920.

The 24-hour race was run by WLYC between the years of 1967 to 2018 for Enterprise, GP14 and initially Firefly dinghies, and subsequently with Lark racing dinghies. After a break of 5 years the 24 hour race returned in 2024.

== Activities ==
WLYC club racing is primarily on Southport Marine Lake Lake or on the sea at Southport (or Ainsdale). In 2006, the club hosted the first GP14s National Championship, and it also holds its 24 Hour Race. The race was named as the 4th best regatta in the world by Yachts and Yachting magazine in its "50 regattas to do before you die". The 2006 race was the 40th yearly race. The club also runs the laser 12 hour race on the Southport marine lake.

The clubhouse is situated next to Southport Sailing Club. The scoring tower won an architecture award in the 1960s.

== See also ==
- Southport 24 Hour Race
- Southport
- Liverpool
- Merseyside
