= Bolton Sailing Club =

Bolton Sailing Club (Bolton SC or BSC) is an inland sailing club located close to the village of Belmont in Lancashire to the north of Bolton, Greater Manchester, in the West Pennine Moors. The club sails on Belmont Reservoir which provides a large area of open water for sailing. Bolton SC was one of the first Clubs in the UK to sign up to the RYA OnBoard Scheme and is also an RYA Sailability Foundation club. In 2009, Bolton SC was awarded RYA Champion Club status.

== Sailing ==
Bolton SC provides extensive racing across a range of dinghy classes. Classes include Lasers, Supernovas, RS400s, RS300s, RS200s, GP14, Phantoms, Graduates and Merlin Rockets. Racing is held every weekend on Sundays between the end of March and the beginning of December, and Wednesday evenings during the summer. Training sessions are run on Friday evenings and Sunday mornings.

Regular social sailing sessions are run on Saturday afternoons.

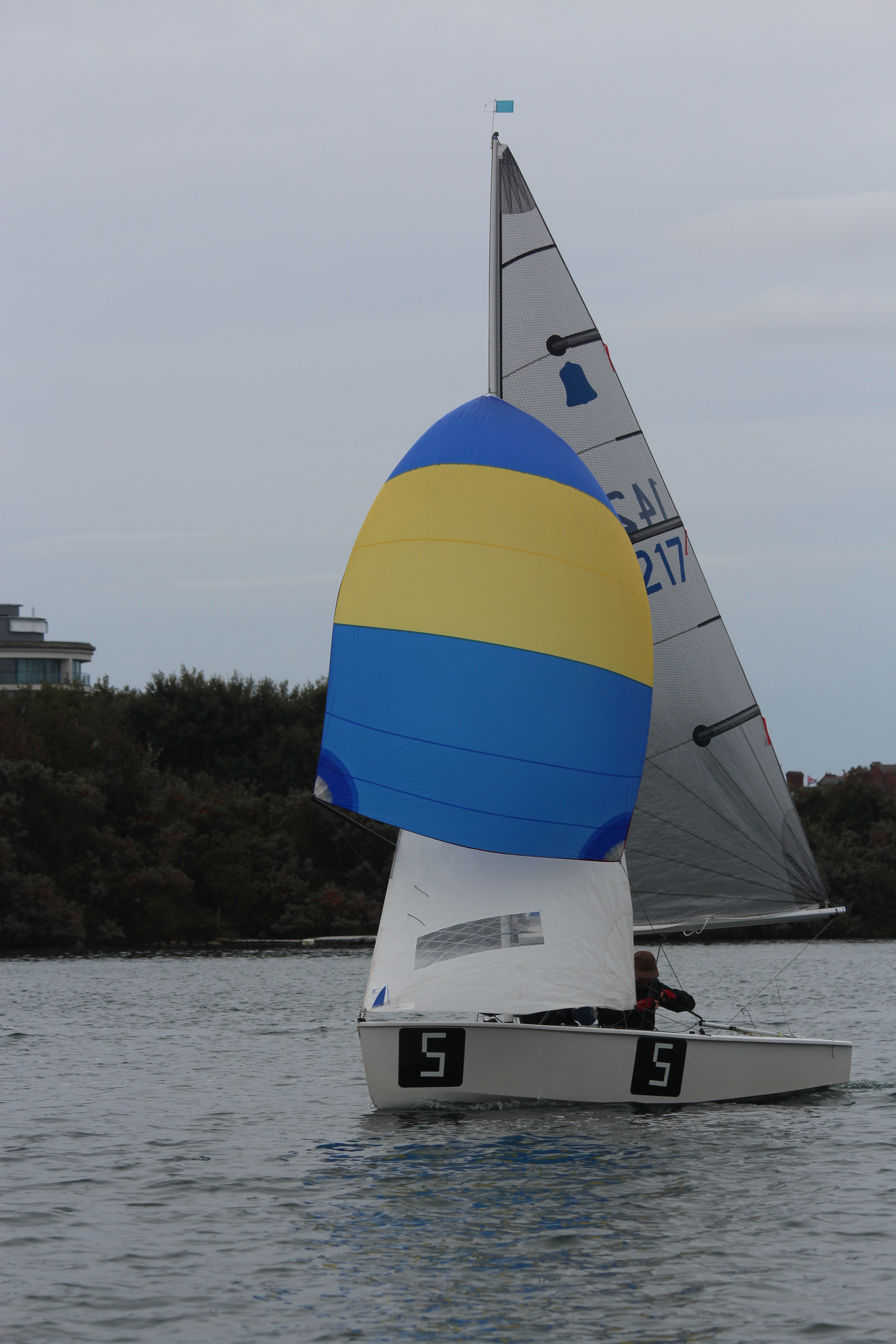
Bolton SC at the 2025 West Lancashire Yacht Club 24 Hour Race

There is a successful Junior Group which trains youngsters to sail and race a range of dinghies including Optimists and Topper dinghies.

== Sailing successes ==
Every year the club enters at least one team in the annual Southport 24 hour race hosted by West Lancashire Yacht Club where it has won the event in 1970, 1976, 1978, 1980, 1985, 1987, 1989, 1990, 1993, 1994, 1995, 2004, 2005 and 2007.

Often, the junior group enter the Junior 12 Hour Race.

Individually, members have been successful nationally and internationally.

Bolton Sailing Club, has been nominated for the RYA and Yachts & Yachting Club of the Year Award 2021, with special recognition for open and inclusive to all.

== Training ==
Bolton Sailing Club is an RYA Recognised Training Centre and offers dinghy sailing training courses for adults and children.
