= Lark (dinghy) =

1966 sailing dinghy class

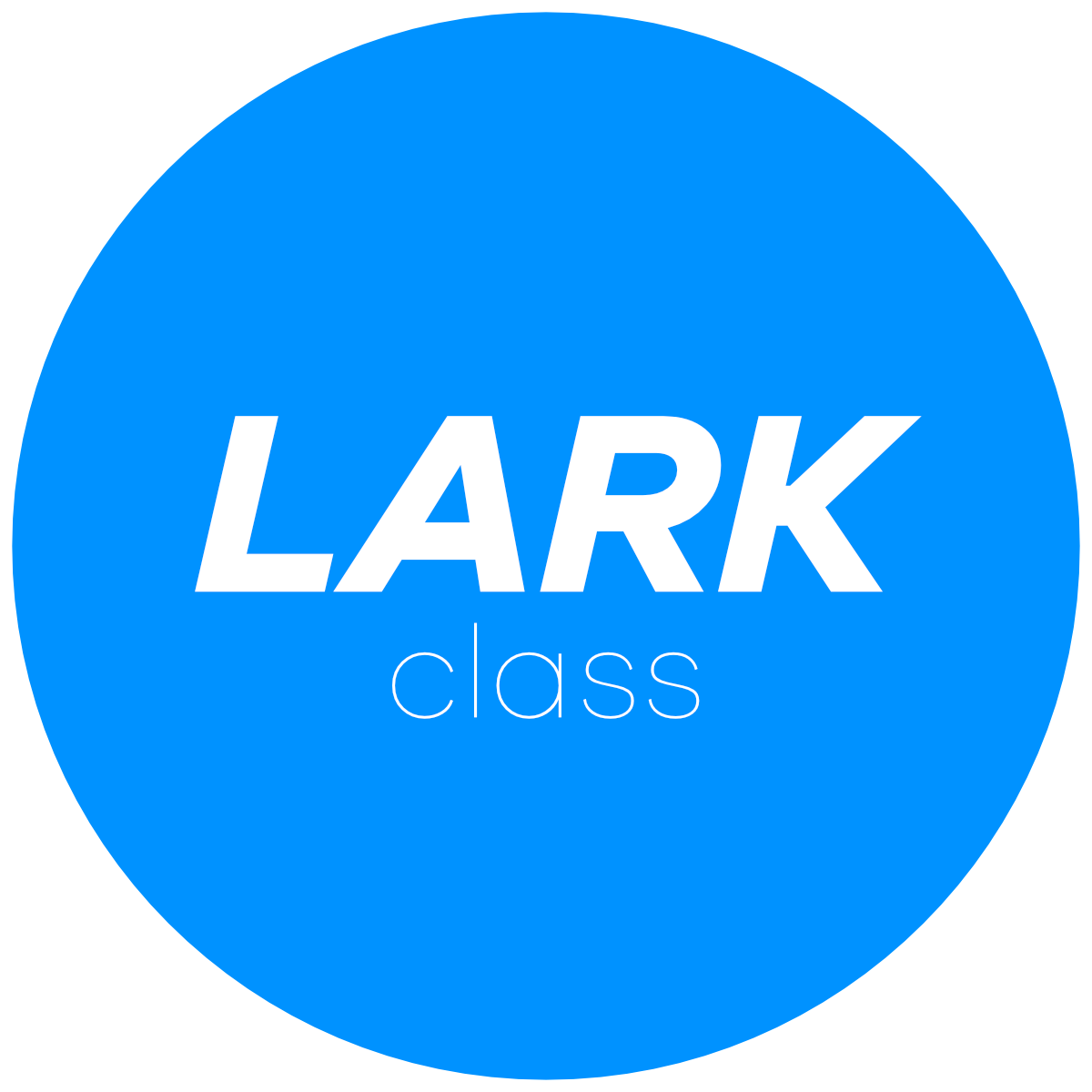
- Class symbol

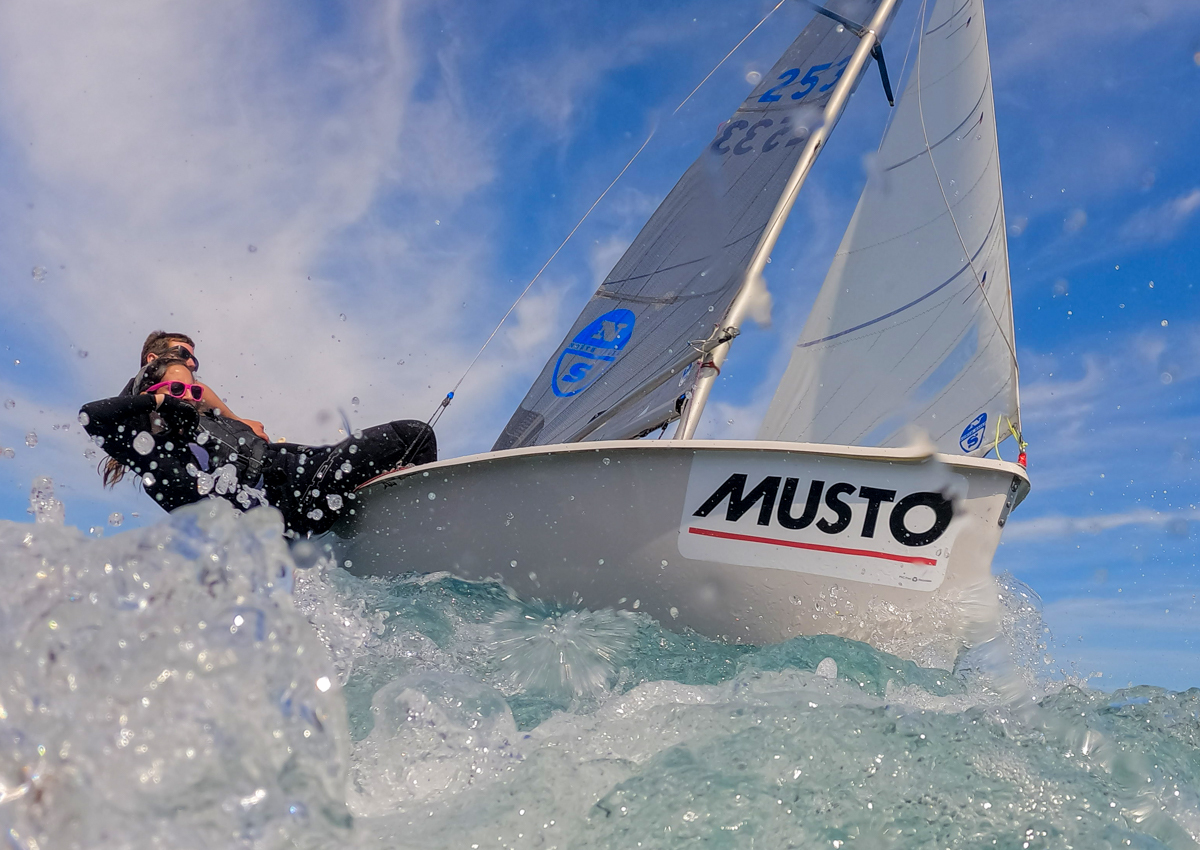
- Lark Class Dinghy

Development
- Designer: Michael Jackson
- Year: 1966
- Name: Lark

Boat
- Crew: 2
- Trapeze: No

Hull
- Type: Monohull
- Construction: Fiberglass
- Hull weight: 95 kilograms (209 lb)
- LOA: 4.065 metres (13.34 ft)
- Beam: 1.642 metres (5.39 ft)

Sails
- Spinnaker area: 7.4 square metres (80 sq ft)
- Upwind sail area: 9.75 square metres (104.9 sq ft)

Racing
- D-PN: 93.6
- RYA PN: 1073

The Lark is a two-person, non-trapeze sailing dinghy, designed in 1966 by Michael Jackson (who was also responsible for many National 12 and Merlin Rocket designs). All Larks are made of glass-reinforced plastic (GRP). The Lark is a one-design class which leads to very close racing.

The boat is very popular in the UK with a new builder (Synergy Marine) signed up in 2021 with a brand new design variation on the existing hull shape. In the UK the class became very popular through the university team racing circuit. The boat was also popular in clubs as it is suited to a wide range of crew weights, typically from 18 stone up to 25 stone. It is still one of the fastest non-trapeze dinghies available. Larks participate in handicap racing, utilising a Portsmouth number of 1073.

National Championships are held every year in the UK. Entries to the Nationals in the 1970s and 1980s was typically 125 plus boats and although numbers have dropped still typically attracts 50 plus boats to the Nationals. This class is well known for its social events and the Masters continue this tradition with an event every two years.

In the United States, Larks are sailed at several east coast universities, including The University of Connecticut. The University of Connecticut fleet is among the oldest functioning fleet in the United States. In the United States of America college sailing forms part of the training scheme for Olympic competition, sharing the same training model as many other collegiate sports. Although the Olympic class 470 is far more powerful than the collegiate 420, the former is similar to the Lark, making it an ideal junior boat for the 470. The Lark also shares skiff like characteristics with the 49er, another Olympic class, hence the Lark's suitability for collegiate sailing in relatively flat water conditions, which amount to roughly 70% of all college venues. In mixed fleets, Larks sail off a D-PN handicap of 93.6.
