= Firefly (dinghy) =

Sailboat class

- F

Development
- Designer: Uffa Fox
- Location: United Kingdom
- Year: 1946
- No. built: 4,270
- Builders: Fairey Marine; Knight and Pink Marine; Omega Boats; Ovington Boats; Porter Boats; Rondar Raceboats; Vic Lewis Boats; Whitecap Composites
- Role: One design racer

Boat
- Crew: two
- Displacement: 260 lb (118 kg)
- Draft: 4.25 ft (1.30 m) with centreboard down

Hull
- Type: monohull
- Construction: glassfibre
- LOA: 12.00 ft (3.66 m)
- LWL: 11.75 ft (3.58 m)
- Beam: 4.67 ft (1.42 m)

Hull appendages
- Keel: centreboard
- Rudder: transom-mounted rudder

Rig
- Rig type: Bermuda rig

Sails
- Sailplan: fractional rigged sloop
- Total sail area: 68.00 sq ft (6.317 m^{2})

Rating
- D-PN: 99.6
- RYA PN: 1168

The Firefly is a British sailboat that was designed by Uffa Fox as a one design racer and first built in 1946. The boat was originally named the Sea Swallow. It was an Olympic class and raced at the 1948 Olympics.

== Production ==
The design was initially built by Fairey Marine in the United Kingdom, starting in 1946 until the end of 1972. It was then built by Vic Lewis Boats from 1973, in glassfibre, using moulds by Craft Mouldings. In 1976 Knight and Pink Marine re-started the production of wooden boats. Omega Boats built a foam sandwich version of the design and then Porter Boats produced it up to 1995. From 1997 to 2023, production was by Rondar Raceboats in the UK. Whitecap Composites in the United States also built Fireflies. As of the summer of 2023, it is now built by Ovington Boats in the UK and remains in production. More than 4,270 Fireflies have been completed.

== Design ==
The Firefly is a recreational sailing dinghy, initially built predominantly of hot-moulded plywood, glassfibre construction was authorized by the class starting in 1965. A rotating mast was introduced in 1970.

The design has a fractional sloop rig, a plumb stem and transom, a transom-hung rudder controlled by a tiller and a retractable centreboard. It displaces 260 lb (118 kg).

The boat has a draft of 4.25 ft (1.30 m) with the centreboard extended and 10 in (25 cm) with it retracted, allowing operation in shallow water, beaching or ground transportation on a trailer.

The design is raced without a spinnaker.

The Firefly has a Portsmouth Yardstick handicap of 1168 (in the RYA scheme) and a D-PN of 99.6 in the US Sailing system.

== Operational history ==
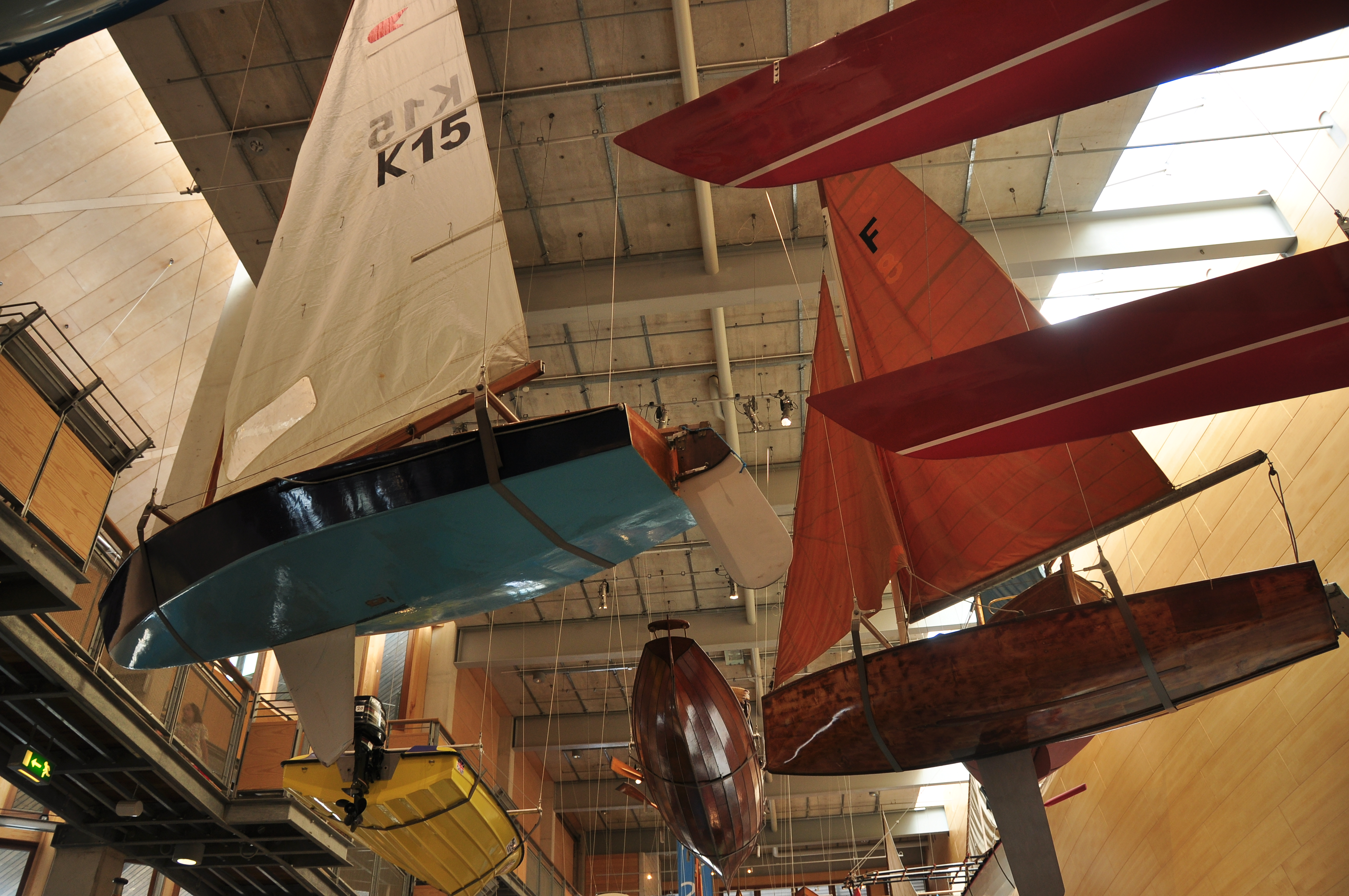
Firefly number one in the National Maritime Museum Cornwall (right)

The boat is supported by an active class club that organizes racing events, the National Firefly Association.

The first four production boats built by Fairey were purchased by the commodore of the Itchenor Sailing Club, Sir Geoffrey Loules and named Fe, Fi, Fo and Fum.

Even though it was designed for a crew of two sailors, the boat was selected for the 1948 Olympics as a single-handed boat. The Olympic sailing events that year were held at Torbay and the gold medal was won by Danish sailor, Paul Elvstrøm. It was replaced as an Olympic class in 1952 by the Finn.

The National Maritime Museum Cornwall notes, "the Firefly was one of the first production dinghies ever built in large numbers, long before the days of glass reinforced plastic boats, and there is no doubt that it put dinghy sailing within financial reach of many people – the initial cost of a boat was £65."

== Boats on display ==
- National Maritime Museum Cornwall - the first production boat, Fe.

== See also ==
- List of sailing boat types
