= GP14 =

Sailing dinghy

- Class symbol

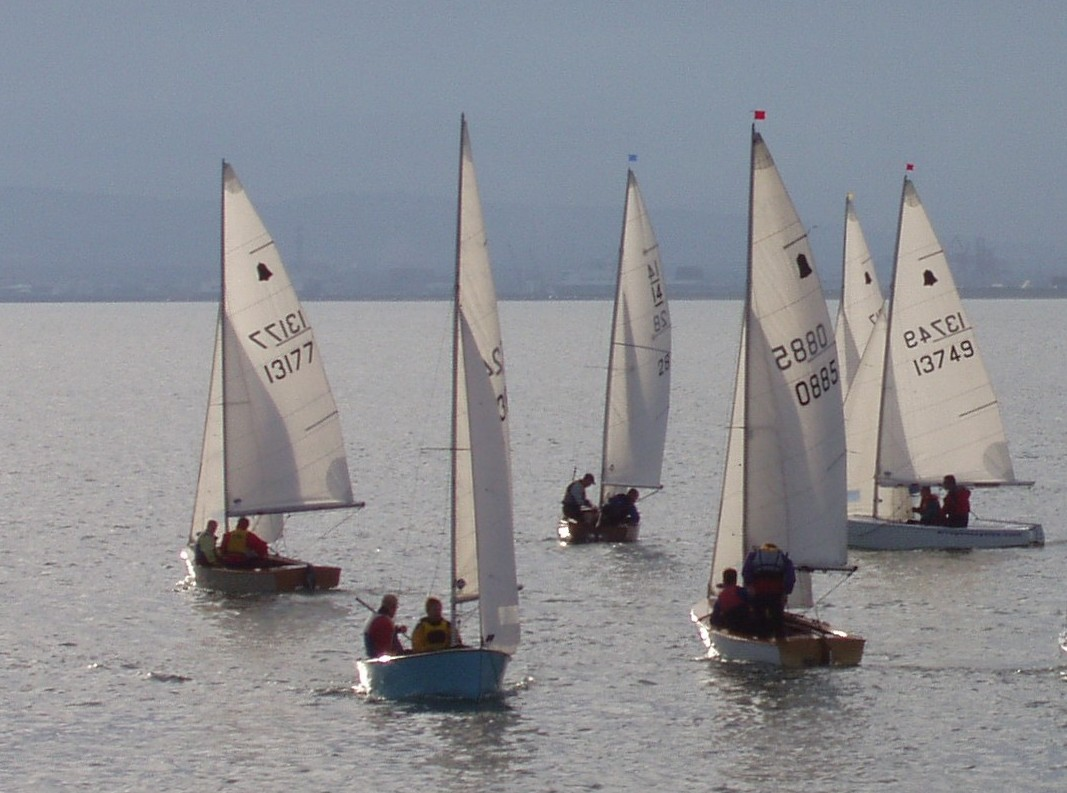

Boat
- Crew: 2
- Draft: 1,200 mm (47 in)

Hull
- Hull weight: 132.9 kg
- LOA: 4.27 m (14.0 ft)
- Beam: 1.54 m (5 ft 1 in)

Sails
- Spinnaker area: 8.4 m^{2}
- Upwind sail area: 12.85 m^{2}

Racing
- D-PN: 100.9
- RYA PN: 1131

The GP14 is a wooden or fibreglass hulled double-handed fractional Bermuda rigged sailing dinghy designed by Jack Holt in 1949.

The class is active in the UK, Ireland, Australia, South Africa, Sri Lanka and the Philadelphia, PA, USA area. With over 14,000 built, the GP14 is popular for both racing and cruising.

== Design ==
The GP14 was designed by Jack Holt in 1949, with the assistance of the Dovey Yacht Club in Aberdyfi. The idea behind the design was to build a General Purpose (GP) 14-foot dinghy which could be sailed or rowed, capable of also being powered effectively by a small outboard motor, able to be towed behind a small family car and able to be launched and recovered reasonably easily, and stable enough to be able to lie to moorings or anchor when required. Racing soon followed, initially with some degree of opposition from Yachting World, who had commissioned the design, and the boat soon turned out to be an outstanding racing design also.

The boat was initially designed with a main and small jib as a comfortable family dinghy. In a design philosophy that is both practical and highly redolent of social attitudes of the day the intention was that she should accommodate a family comprising parents plus two children, and specifically that the jib should be modest enough for "Mum" or older children to handle, while she should perform well enough to give "Dad" some excitement when not taking the family out. While this rig is still available, and can be useful when using the boat to teach sailing, or for family sailing, and has some popularity for cruising, the boat is more commonly seen with the full modern rig of a mainsail, genoa and spinnaker. Australian boats also routinely use trapezes.

In the late eighties underfloor buoyancy was introduced to the foam-reinforced plastic (FRP) boats, and the internal layout of these boats underwent several stages of modernisation. In the early 1990s a new internal layout was introduced in the wooden boats (the "Series 2"), with built-in underfloor buoyancy.

This was further modified over the following years, led by boat builders Alistair Duffin, who builds in wood, and Holt Allen (later Speed Sails Ltd and now Winder Boats), who manufacture in GRP (glass-reinforced plastic) and FRP. As of the 2011 RYA Dinghy Show a new builder in FRP, Boon Boats, has entered the market with a significantly different interior layout, developed in agreement with the Class Association. The majority of wooden boats in recent years have been built by Alistair Duffin. Another highly respected wooden boat builder of the class, Tim Harper, has recently returned to building them after a period not doing so. New to the fleet of wooden builders is Gingerboats. A few boats are still amateur built, and one amateur-built boat won the National Championship in both 2002 and 2005 (and is still regularly winning in top flight competition), while another amateur-built boat came second in the 2006 World Championship. Racing honours are evenly divided between the wooden and the plastic boats. New boats are currently available in wood, GRP and FRP.

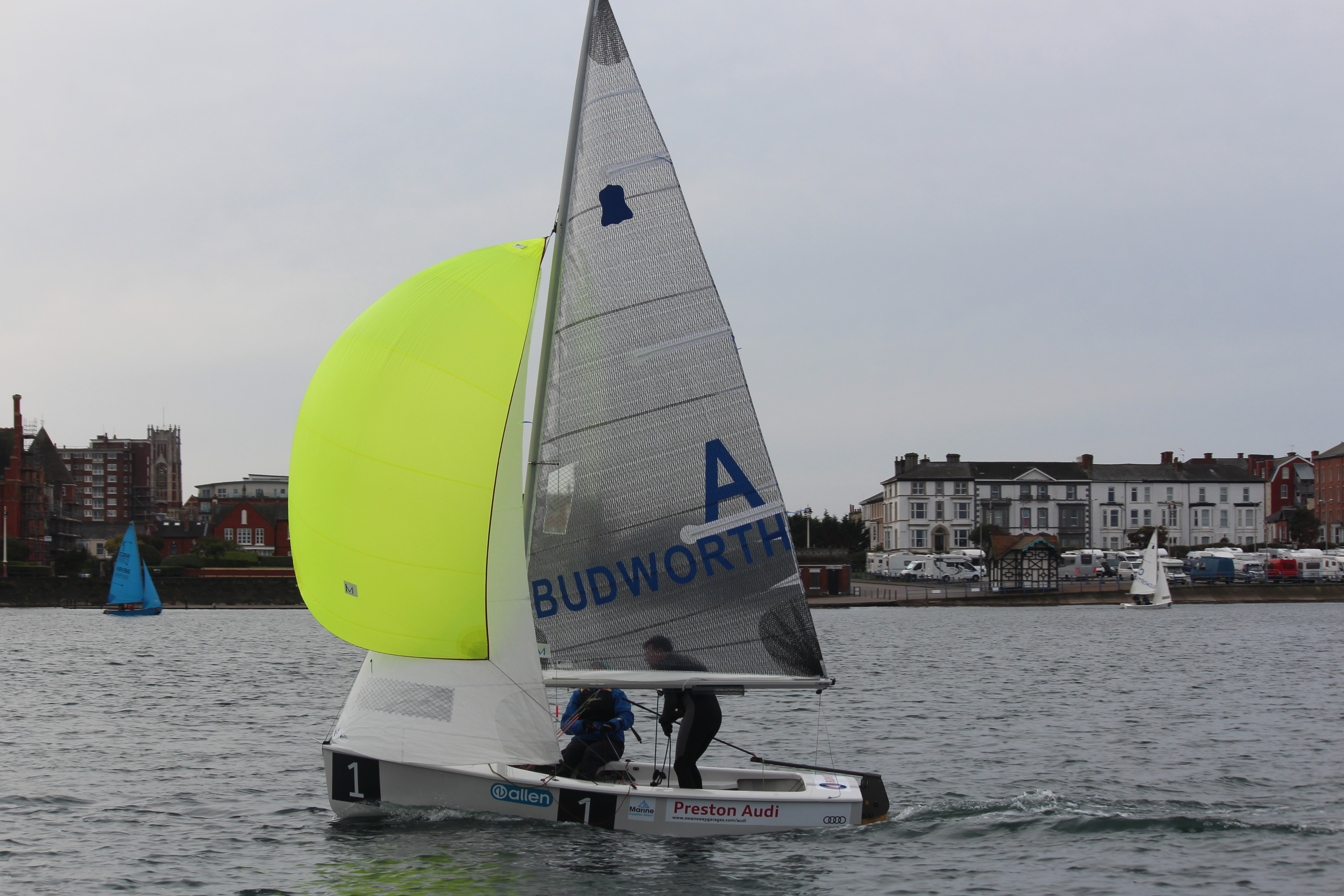
Budworth SC at the 2025 Southport 24 Hour Race

== Racing ==
The biannual GP14 World Championships where most recently held at Plas Heli in Pwllheli, Wales and was won by Matt Mee and Chris Robinson of Red Wharf Bay Sailing Club and Blackpool & Fleetwood Yacht Club respectively. The 2026 Worlds are due to be held at the Royal North of Ireland Yacht Club in Belfast, Northern Ireland.

GP14s are raced at the annual Southport 24 Hour Race.

== Cruising ==
A number of owners cruise the boats, in some cases as well as racing them and in other cases in preference to racing, and cruises have ranged from the gentlest day sailing to such ambitious undertakings as crossings of the English Channel and the Irish Sea, and a circumnavigation of the Isle of Mull. Indeed, in 1959 one intrepid owner sailed single-handed from Southend to Calais, and followed this in 1962 with a trip from Dover to Ostend. More recently, in 2011, two GP14s in company cruised the full length of the Great Glen, from Fort William to Inverness.

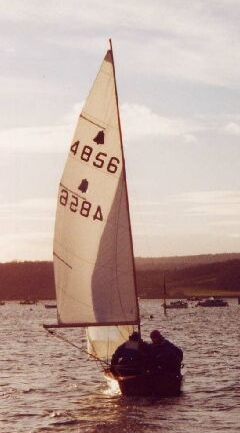
GP14 from astern

In the very early days of the class, when people used to a more traditional type of dinghy dubbed this new creation the "floating coffin", Roger Seal conclusively demonstrated her seaworthiness by sailing from Cardiff to New Quay, Wales, via St. David's Head.

Very occasional cruising owners camp aboard, although it has to be admitted that space for this is more than a little restricted.

Most serious cruising boats, even if only day-cruising, set dedicated cruising sails; these are constructed differently from racing sails and from heavier but more supple cloth, and are nearly always equipped with a means of reefing. The original design, with the small jib, provided for square gooseneck roller reefing for the main; modern boats usually prefer slab/jiffy reefing for the main, and some set fully reefable genoas by means of a headsail reefing drum and associated equipment (including a reefing spar).

An active Class Association supports both racing and cruising activities.
