= Enterprise (dinghy) =

Bermuda-rigged racing dinghy

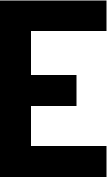
- Class symbol

- Enterprises racing on the River Thames

Development
- Designer: Jack Holt
- Year: 1956
- Name: Enterprise

Boat
- Crew: 2
- Draft: 8 in (0.20 m); 3 ft 10 in (1.17 m)

Hull
- Type: Monohull
- Hull weight: 207 lb (94 kg)
- LOA: 13 ft 3 in (4.04 m)
- LOH: 12 ft 11 in (3.94 m)
- Beam: 5 ft 3 in (1.60 m)

Hull appendages
- Keel: Centreboard

Rig
- Rig type: Sloop

Sails
- Upwind sail area: 115 sq ft (10.7 m^{2})

Racing
- D-PN: 92.6
- RYA PN: 1117

The Enterprise is a Bermuda rigged sailing dinghy with a double-chined hull and distinctive blue sails. Normally crewed by two, and sometimes carrying a third crew member, it may also be sailed single-handed.

== History ==
The Enterprise was designed by Jack Holt in 1956 for The News Chronicle during the post-war sailing boom, becoming the first UK sailing dinghy to be sponsored by a national newspaper (followed in due course by the Mirror Dinghy, also designed by Jack Holt). It remains popular in the United Kingdom and a dozen or so other countries, for cruising and racing. Adopted by many sailing schools, the Enterprise's combination of size, weight, and power has widespread appeal. The Enterprise is accredited as an International Class by the International Sailing Federation, the ISAF.

The Enterprise is most often sailed with no spinnaker. However the international class rules allow the decision of whether to allow spinnakers to be made by the national authority. In the U.K. and Canada, no spinnakers were allowed until 2002 when a new PY handicap was introduced in the UK to allow spinnakers to be used in multi class racing in clubs, although spinnakers may still not be used in "Class" racing; in the United States they are allowed.

Early boats, wooden and GRP, used buoyancy bags fixed under the benches and thwarts for internal buoyancy but nowadays foam reinforced plastic boats have built in buoyancy tanks improving stiffness and removing much of the maintenance associated with air-filled bags. Wooden boats still tend to have buoyancy bags to the rear and a forward bulkhead.

They are also relatively unstable in comparison with other dinghies of similar performance, they have handling characteristics which would generally be associated with much faster designs.

The first two Enterprises built were sailed from Dover to Calais both as a test and for advertising purposes. This feat was repeated on the Enterprise's 50th anniversary, but this time the two boats not only sailed to France, but also returned to England.
