= Skipper dinghy =

Type of sailboat

Skipper
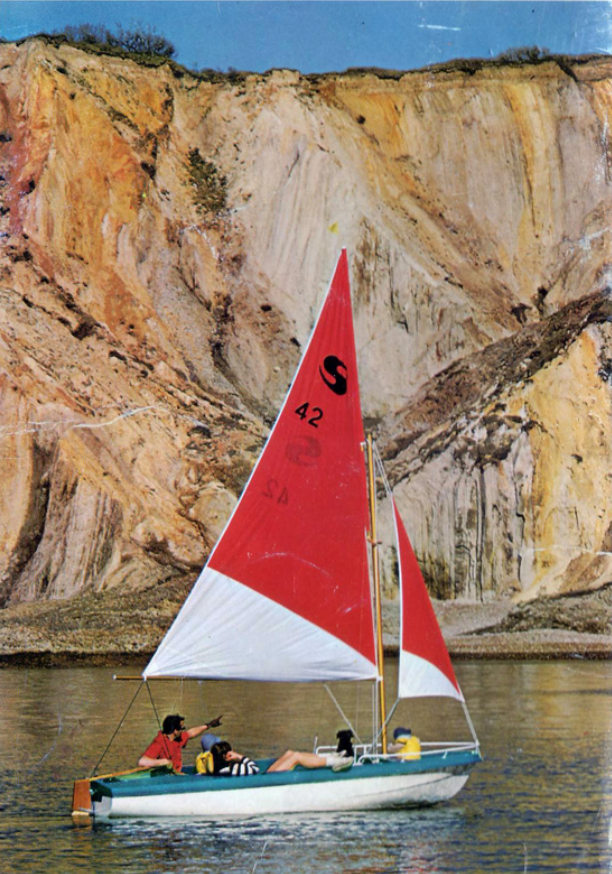
- Skipper 14" Dinghy

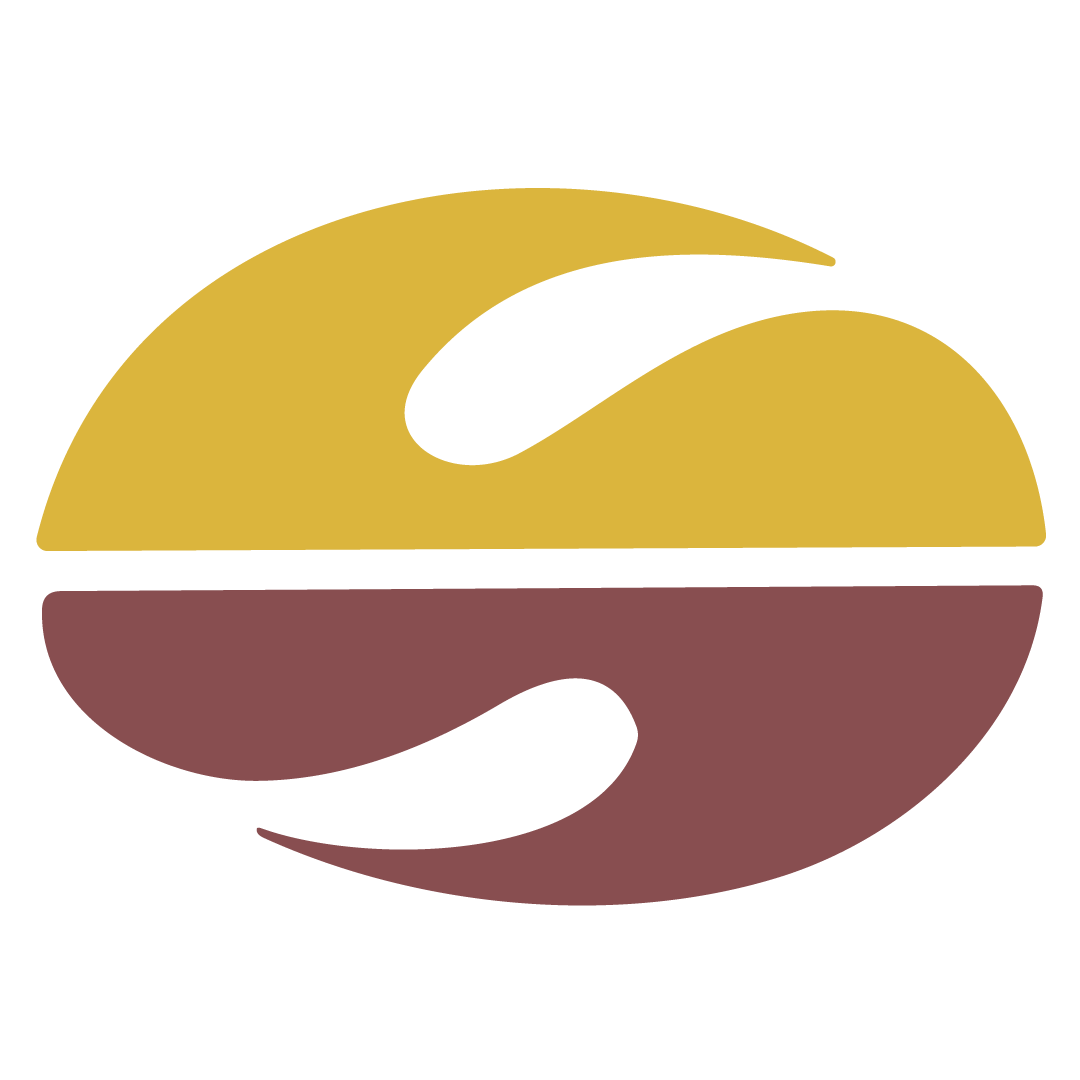
- Class symbol

Development
- Designer: Peter Milne (boat designer)
- Name: Skipper

Boat
- Crew: 1-2

Hull
- Type: Monohull
- Construction: Glassfiber molding
- Hull weight: 160 lb (73 kg)
- LOA: 13 ft 11 in (4.24 m)
- Beam: 5 ft (1.5 m)

Rig
- Rig type: Bermuda

Sails
- Mainsail area: 70.05 sq ft (6.508 m^{2})
- Jib/genoa area: 13.45 sq ft (1.250 m^{2})

The Skipper Dinghy is a centreboard class of sailing dinghies designed by Peter Milne (boat designer) for recreational use and racing. There are three models of the Skipper Dinghy: the Skipper 12, the Skipper 14 and the Skipper 17. The Skipper's construction is to the standard of the SBBNF (Ship and Boat Builders National Federation) requirements. The Skipper sailboats were sold in large numbers, and have retained a devoted owner base.

Peter Milne (boat designer) (20 September 1934 – 23 May 2008) was one of Britain's best known designers and sailing journalists. He designed more than forty crafts, including the Skipper, Fireball and Javelin dinghies.

Richmond Marine Ltd, a now-defunct company, was responsible for the production of the Skipper Dinghy in the 1970s. Richmond Marine was the project of David Thorpe, sometime Yachting Correspondent of the Daily Telegraph and winner of the Prince of Wales Cup sailing the International 14, in 1956. Bourne Plastics of Netherfield, Nottingham built the hulls for Richmond Marine's dinghies of which 800 were made and sold in the first year.

The Skipper Dinghy is no longer in production as Richmond Marine Ltd has ceased operations.

Ellen MacArthur, a successful solo long-distance yachtswoman who broke the world record for the fastest solo circumnavigation, gaining her international renown, had as her first cruiser 'Kestrel' a Skipper 17, which she writes about in her book 'Taking on the World'.

Margaret Dye, wife of famous sailor Frank Dye, mentions the Skipper 14 as a viable alternative to the Wayfarer in her book Dinghy Cruising.

Sir Alec Rose, another British sailor who became famous for his solo circumnavigation, wrote a small practical guide to sailing the Skipper Dinghy 'Skippering Skipper with Sir Alec Rose.'.

== Skipper 17 ==
The Skipper 17 is a classic sailboat designed by Peter Milne and first built in 1966 by Anderson, Rigden & Perkins/Richmond Marine in the UK. This centerboard (trunk) sailboat has a fractional sloop rigging and measures 17.00 ft in length overall (LOA) and 6.42 ft in beam, with a displacement of 700.00 lb. The sail area is reported at 150.00 ft^{2}, making for a sail area-to-displacement ratio of 30.49. The boat is constructed of fiberglass and has a maximum draft of 3.75 ft and a minimum draft of 0.75 ft. Various versions of the Skipper 17 were produced, including a dayboat version, a larger cuddy cabin version called the Skipper Mariner, and a rare variant called the Skipper's Mate.

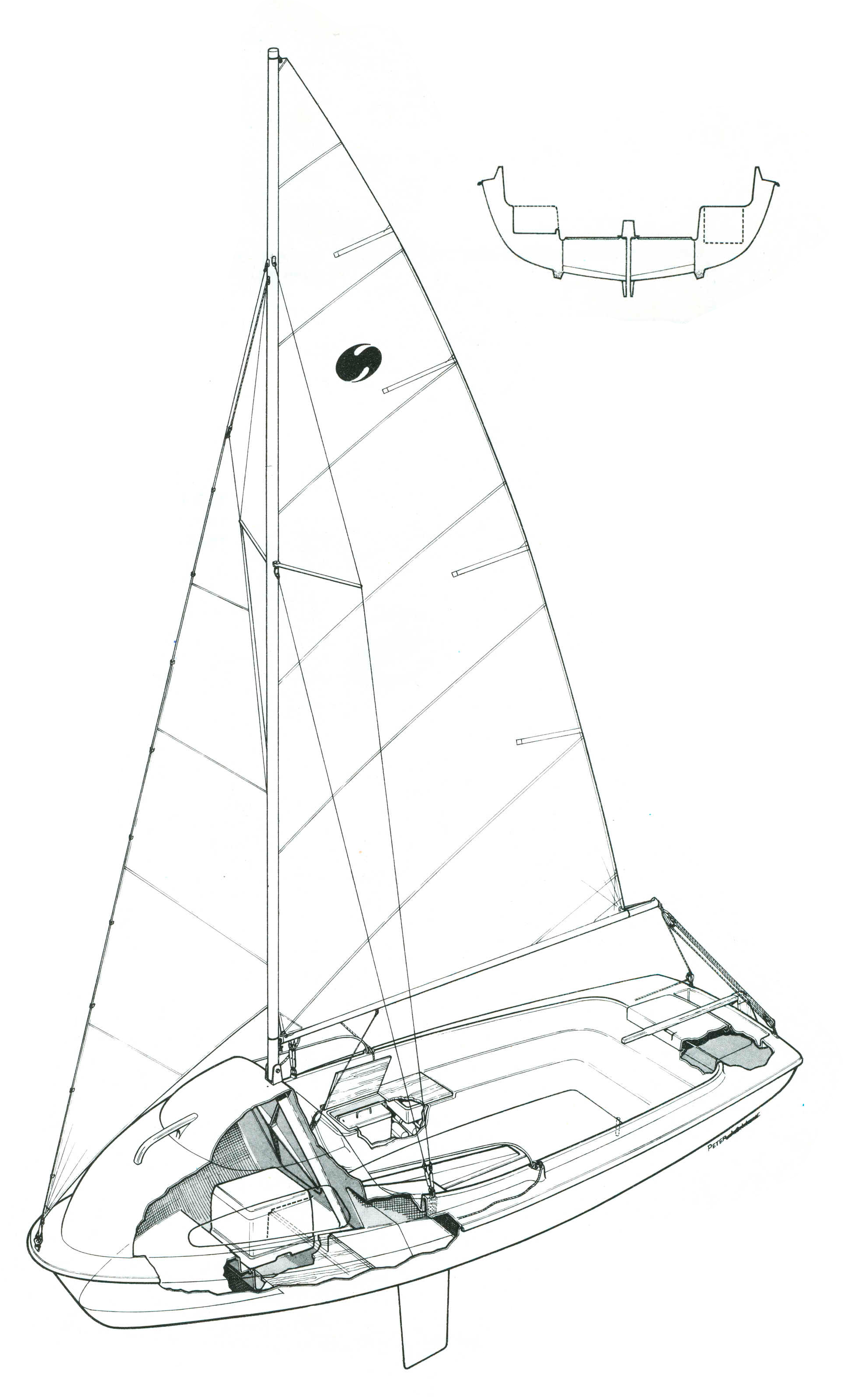
Skipper 17 exploded-view

== Skipper 14 ==
The Skipper 14 was first built in 1967. It is 13 ft 11 in (4.24 m) long and 5 ft (1.5 m) wide, with an overall depth of 0.63 m (2 ft 1 in). It has a mainsail area of 70.05 sq ft (6.508 m^{2}) and a jib area of 13.45 sq ft (1.250 m^{2}). The hull is constructed of glassfibre moulding and weighs 160 lb (73 kg). The fittings are made of injection-moulded ICl Maranyl and Kematal, as well as stainless steel or anodized aluminum. The hull colour is white, while the deck can be green, orange, or blue. The sails are made of Terylene, and the sail colour can be green, orange, or red on a white base. The dodger/tonneau and cushions are white and made of waterproof plastic.

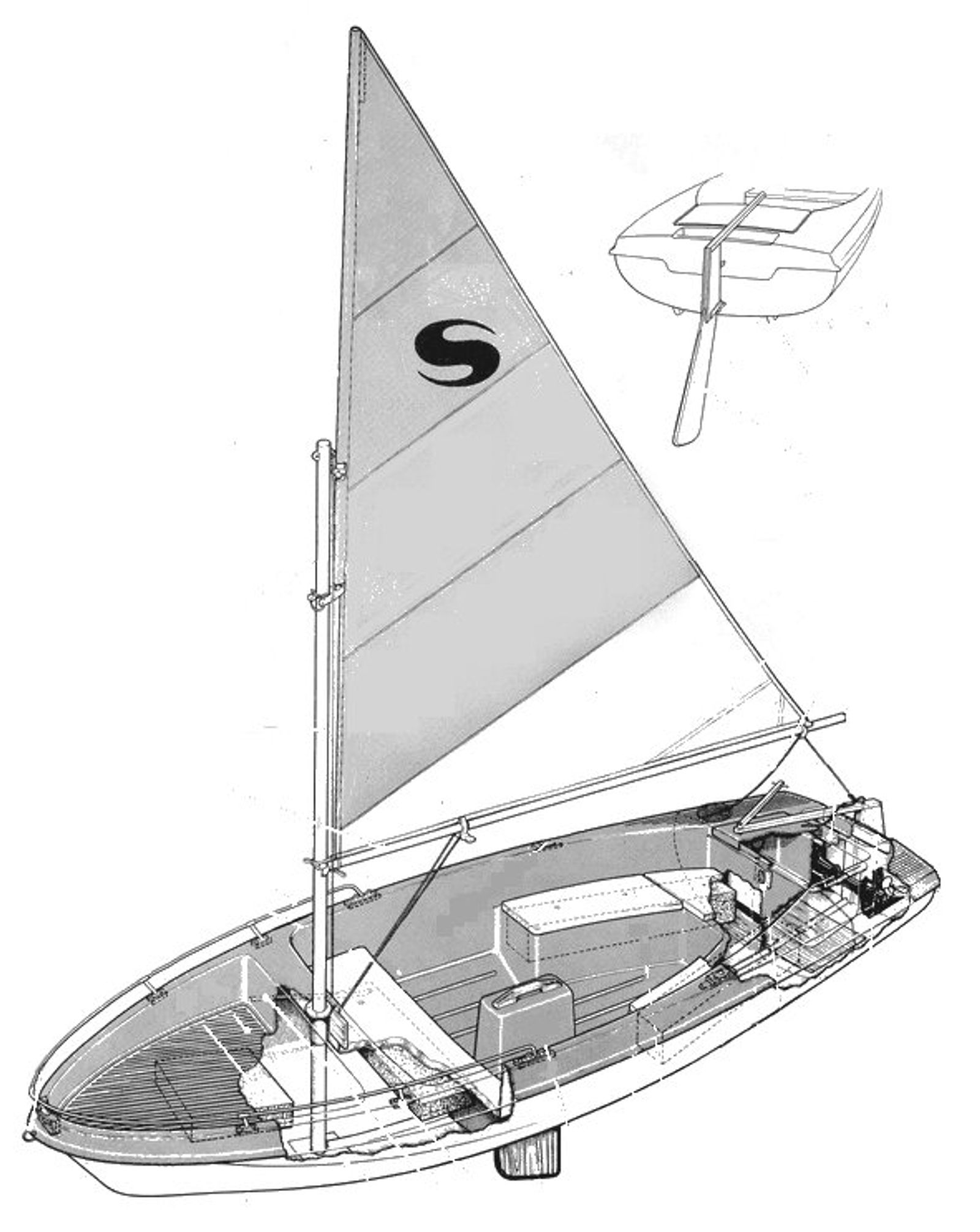
Skipper 14" exploded-view drawing

== Skipper 12 ==
The Skipper 12 is 12 ft (3.7 m) long and 4 ft 9 in (1.45 m) wide. It has a mainsail area of 65 sq ft (6.0 m^{2}) and it has no jib. The hull is also constructed of glassfibre moulding.

== In popular culture ==
In popular culture, the main character in Julia Jones' novel "Black Waters" is depicted as sailing a Skipper Dinghy.
