= Mistral 16 =

Sailboat class

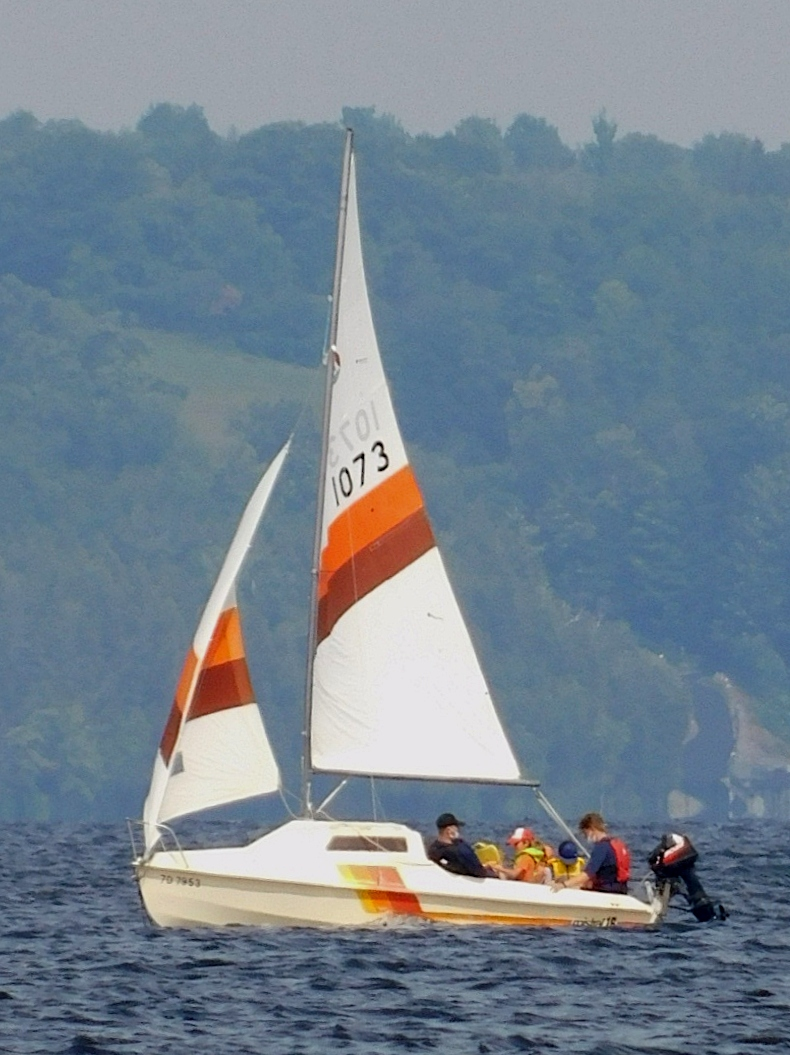
- Mistral 16 with cuddy cabin

Development
- Location: Canada
- Year: 1980
- Builder: Canadian Yacht Builders
- Role: Sailing dinghy
- Name: Mistral 16

Boat
- Displacement: 365 lb (166 kg)
- Draft: 3.83 ft (1.17 m) with centreboard down

Hull
- Type: monohull
- Construction: fibreglass
- LOA: 15.83 ft (4.82 m)
- LWL: 14.83 ft (4.52 m)
- Beam: 6.08 ft (1.85 m)
- Engine: outboard motor

Hull appendages
- Keel: centreboard
- Rudder: transom-mounted rudder

Rig
- Rig type: Bermuda rig

Sails
- Sailplan: fractional rigged sloop
- Total sail area: 141.00 sq ft (13.099 m^{2})

The Mistral 16 is a Canadian sailing dinghy that was designed as a daysailer and first built in 1980.

The Mistral 16 is a development of the Ian Proctor designed 1959 Wayfarer dinghy and is similar to the CL 16.

== Production ==
The design was built by Canadian Yacht Builders in Canada, starting in 1980, but it is now out of production.

== Design ==
The Mistral 16 is a recreational dinghy, built predominantly of fibreglass. It has a fractional sloop rig, a spooned, slightly raked stem, a plumb transom, a transom-hung rudder controlled by a tiller and a folding centreboard. It displaces 365 lb (166 kg).

The boat has a draft of 3.83 ft (1.17 m) with the centreboard extended and 8 in (20 cm) with it retracted, allowing beaching or ground transportation on a trailer.

The boat may be optionally fitted with a small outboard motor for docking and manoeuvring. It was built as both an open boat and with a small cuddy cabin.

== Operational history ==
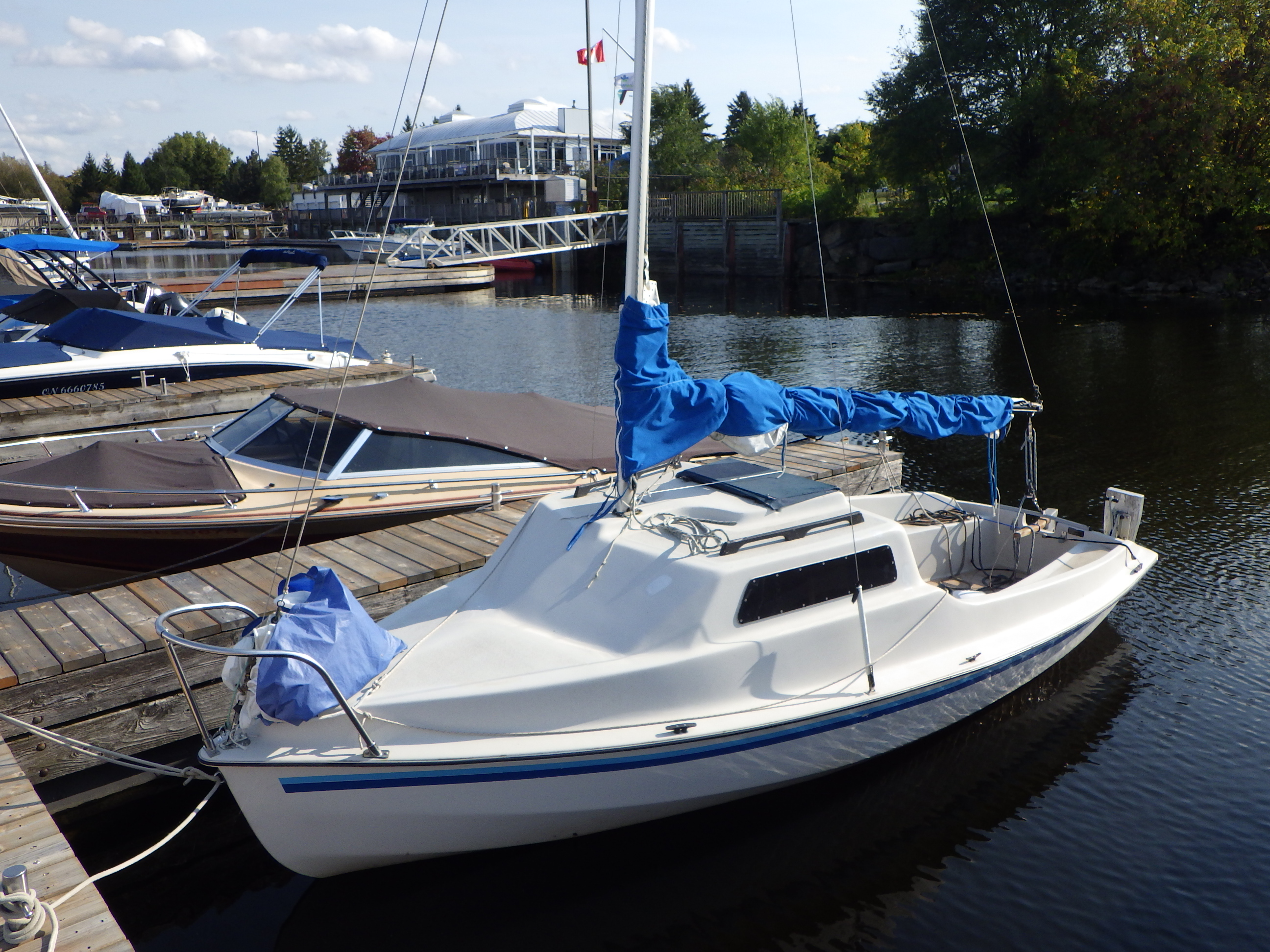
Mistral 16

In a review Michael McGoldrick wrote, "the formula for this boat was simply to add a small cuddy cabin to the standard Mistral 16 open dinghy. Although the cabin seems to stick out a bit in the front of the boat, this formula has produced a good sailing vessel with a relatively roomy cabin for a 16 footer. While its cabin seems to offer a touch more space than other boats in this size range, it's still going to be a tight fit for anyone who plans to overnight inside this boat."

== See also ==
- List of sailing boat types

Related development

- CL 16
- Wayfarer (dinghy)
