= Bell Seagull and Seamew =

Type of small boat

The Bell Woodworking Seagull and Seamew are both small sloop-rigged marine ply sailing boats of the Trailer yacht type designed by Ian Proctor, who was also responsible for the design of many small sailing dinghies in seven different classes including the extremely popular Topper, and Wanderer.

The Seagull is widely regarded in the UK sailing community as a 'plywood classic', - a boat which many young families learned to build and then learned to sail in. After the Seagull and Seamew Ian Proctor later went on to design similar sized boats such as the Nimrod, Eclipse, Prelude, and the Pirate.

== Seagull ==
Seagull

Development
- Designer: Ian Proctor
- Location: England
- Year: 1992
- Name: Seagull

Boat
- Draft: 1.14 m (3 ft 9 in)

Hull
- Type: sloop
- Construction: marine ply
- Hull weight: 860 kg (1,900 lb)
- LOA: 5.64 m (18.5 ft)
- LWL: 5.26 m (17.3 ft)
- Beam: 2.06 m (6 ft 9 in)

Hull appendages
- Keel: Fixed

Rig
- Rig type: Masthead rig
- Mast height: 7.01 m (23.0 ft)

Sails
- Mainsail area: 9.3 m^{2} (100 sq ft)
- Jib/genoa area: Jib: 6.5 m^{2} (70 sq ft); Genoa: 10.7 m^{2} (115 sq ft)
- Spinnaker area: 14 m^{2} (150 sq ft)

Racing
- D-PN: 100

By the mid-1950s, Ian Proctor had been responsible for the design of many small sailing dinghies, however he had yet to work on anything larger, that is, until he was approached by Bell Woodworking - who were responsible for the kit of the GP14 sailing dinghy. The Bell Woodworking Company wanted Proctor to design a small sailing cruiser which would be suitable for both coastal and inland waters. Bell also required a design that was easy to produce in kit form and a design that the amateur builder would find easy to construct. The outcome of Proctors work was the 'Seagull' The Seagull sold in numbers, and although Bell did not have any exact figures for the number of both kits sold and boats built in house, the number of kits is estimated to be somewhere between 250 and 300. It is known that some kits were also shipped to the eastern US Seaboard. In the early days of its inception many young families bought the Seagull as a kit and built it over a year or so, for some it was their first boat and they even learned to sail in the Seagull.

Jerry English and his Bell Seagull at Milford Haven, Wales

=== Sailing Details ===
What made the Seagull stand out from the crowd, however, was her sailing performance. Here was a DIY sailing boat, which most people perhaps would have estimated as possessing (at best) adequate performance. However, the Seagull, during testing, showed that she could still sail fully canvassed in 32kt winds.

=== Accommodation ===
The cabin, although considered small for a boat of its size by today's standards, enjoyed 1.14 m (3 ft 9 in) of headroom, two berths, room for a chemical head to port and a small galley area to starboard. The cockpit was large and could seat up to six adults, or could be used if a boom tent were employed for an additional two small berths.

=== Special features ===
Auxiliary power was provided by an outboard motor mounted on the port quarter of the transom, a small well inboard of the transom allowed the motor to be tilted out of the water when not in use. Although some boats were fitted with a small single or twin cylinder inboard engine by retrofit.

=== Construction ===
The Seagull featured a lifting keel and ballast stub which weighed 158 kg (348 lb) – the use of such a retractable keel at the time was seen as unusual. The keel was raised and lowered by means of a winch mechanism, which was situated in the cockpit in early boats but moved to the cabin on later kits and builds. The hull was a four plank lapstrake hard-chine design, with each plank glued and fastened to the frames.

== Seamew ==
Seamew
Development
- Designer: Ian Proctor
- Location: England
- Year: 1992
- Name: Seamew

Boat
- Draft: 1.27 m (4 ft 2 in)

Hull
- Type: sloop
- Construction: marine ply
- LOA: 6.7 m (22 ft)
- LWL: 6.4 m (21 ft)
- Beam: 2.24 m (7 ft 4 in)

Hull appendages
- Keel: Fixed

Rig
- Rig type: Masthead rig

Sails
- Mainsail area: 12.18 m^{2} (131.1 sq ft)
- Jib/genoa area: Jib: 6.4 m^{2} (69 sq ft); Genoa 1: 12.8 m^{2} (138 sq ft); Genoa 2: 6.67 m^{2} (71.8 sq ft)
- Spinnaker area: 26 m^{2} (280 sq ft)

Racing
- D-PN: 1060

Following the success of the Seagull, Bell Woodworking commissioned Proctor to design a big sister to the Seagull. This resulted in the Seamew, the first of which was built in January 1963. Again she was along similar lines as the Seagull. The Seamew was given the Portsmouth no. of 106. As with the Seagull, the Seamew sold well, - a testament to the reputation and performance of the Seagull who preceded her. Roughly 150 Seamew kits and boats were produced, with some also being shipped to the USA.

=== Sailing Details ===
As far as performance was concerned, the Seamew was similar to the Seagull, but she was 'stiffer'- the increased ballast ratio helping to achieve this.

=== Accommodation ===
The cabin also benefitted from an extra 3" of headroom, and there were 3 berths instead of 2 with room for a sea toilet in the forepeak and a small galley area with sink. The cockpit was large and could seat up to six adults, or could be used if a boom tent were employed for an additional two small berths.

=== Special features ===
The same retractable bulbed keel as the Seagull but heavier weighing 227 kg (500 lb).

=== Construction ===
The hull was a four plank lapstrake hard-chine design, with each plank glued and fastened to the frames. Also the Seamew was designed to have a small inboard engine fitted to the bilge.

== Owners association ==
There was a very active Seagull/Seamew association up until the mid-1970s. However, as plywood boats (and especially homebuilt plywood boats) became less fashionable in the late 1970s and early 1980s – giving way to fibreglass construction methods – the owners association disappeared due to lack of interest in 1983. There is no official association presently.
