= Gull (dinghy) =

Sailing dinghy designed by Ian Proctor, in 1956

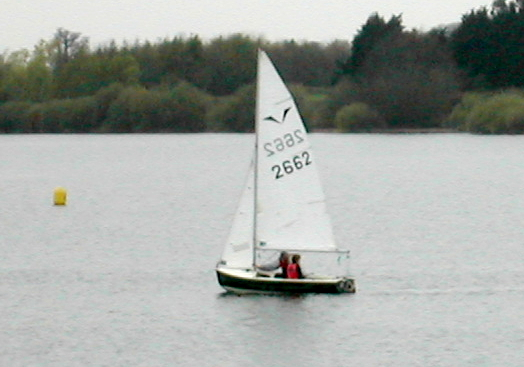
- Gull Spirit 2662

Boat
- Crew: 2 or 1
- Draft: 0.91 m (3 ft 0 in) (board down)

Hull
- Hull weight: 88 kg (194 lb)
- LOA: 3.35 m (11.0 ft)
- Beam: 1.44 m (4 ft 9 in)

Sails
- Mainsail area: 5.12 m^{2} (55.1 sq ft)
- Jib/genoa area: 1.67 m^{2} (18.0 sq ft)
- Spinnaker area: 5.57 m^{2} (60.0 sq ft)

Racing
- D-PN: 119.5
- RYA PN: 1363

The Gull sailing dinghy was designed by Ian Proctor in 1956, originally as a frameless double-chine plywood boat. However, it has been through several incarnations: the wooden Mark I, GRP Mark III, GRP Gull Spirit and GRP Gull Calypso. Today it is popular with sailing schools, especially in the United Kingdom.

The original prototype Gull (the "Jolly Roger") was built by Ian Proctor to teach his own children the skills of dinghy sailing. This became a production boat, often built from a kit, and produced by Smallcraft of Blockley. A GRP version was produced from 1966 but, being a near-exact copy of the wooden boat, was not well suited to GRP manufacture.

A Mark II was introduced as a cheaper GRP version without a permanent fore-deck, but did not prove very popular. The original boats became known as Mark 1 and wooden boats, probably mainly from kits, continued to be built to this specification. In the late 1970s a Mark 3 was produced, starting with no 1800. This was a radical redesign featuring a round bilge hull, greater beam and side decks. The design was optimised for and only available in GRP. Few wooden boats are believed to have been built after the Mk3 came out.

The Gull Spirit, introduced in the late 1990s by Anglo Marine Services, was a major redesign in GRP: principally a return to a double-chine hull similar to those used on the original wooden boats. The Spirit's interior was in many respects cloned from the larger Wanderer sailing dinghy (another Ian Proctor design). It was later followed by the Gull Calypso, a simplified design by Hartley Laminates with no wooden parts.

The Gull has a reputation as a safe and stable boat but, particularly with the addition of a spinnaker, it is raced competitively. It is classed as a two-person boat but can easily be launched, sailed and recovered single-handed, making it a suitable cruising boat for the solo sailor. It can easily be rowed (with the addition of rowlocks) and can be fitted with an outboard engine. Hence, it is a very versatile boat.

As of August 2013 there is now a new Gull available. The Mark 6 Gull has been redesigned and modernized and is now available from the builders, Hartley Laminates UK.
