= Kestrel (disambiguation) =

A kestrel is a type of bird.

- Common kestrel, the most common species

Kestrel may also refer to:

== Aerospace, aviation, vehicles ==
- Kestrel (rocket engine)
- Kestrel, the Glasflügel 401 fibreglass glider
  - The Slingsby Kestrel, UK version of this glider
- Hawker Siddeley P.1127 "Kestrel", a prototype of the Hawker Siddeley Harrier aircraft
- Miles Kestrel, a private venture aircraft developed into the Miles Master
- Rolls-Royce Kestrel, a piston engine
- Kestrel, a British Rail HS4000 prototype diesel locomotive
- Riley Kestrel, a badge-engineered version of the BMC ADO16 or Morris 1100 car
- KESTREL, the call sign of UK-based Thomas Cook Airlines
- VH-71 Kestrel helicopter
- Kestrel K-350, a prototype turboprop aircraft
- Kestrel (surveillance system)
- Seedwings Europe Kestrel, an Austrian hang glider design
- T-19 Kestrel, the US military designation for the Game Composites GB1 GameBird

== Boats ==
- Kestrel (dinghy)
- Kestrel (steam yacht)

== Computer software ==
- "Kestrel", an open source web server for ASP.NET Core
- "Kestrel", codename for the J2SE 1.3 release of the Java programming language
- "Kestrel", codename for Opera web browser version 9.5
- Kestrel Institute, a spin-off company of SRI International

== Fiction and entertainment ==
=== Books ===
- The Kestrel, a novel by Lloyd Alexander
- Kestrel, a character in The Farseer Trilogy by Robin Hobb

=== Comics ===
- Kestrel (DC Comics), a comics character, supervillain antagonist of Hawk and Dove
- Kestrel (Marvel Comics), a comics character, a test subject of the Weapon X Project
- Kestrel, the main character of the web comic Queen of Wands

=== Games ===
- The Kestrel, the default unlocked and first playable ship in the roguelike space exploration game FTL: Faster Than Light
- Kestrel, a foe in the computer game Rogue
- Kestrel, spaceship in the massively-multiplayer online game Eve Online
- CVN-30, OFS Kestrel, a ship in the Ace Combat video games
- The Atinoda Kestrel, a spaceship in the Escape Velocity video game trilogy
- McDonnell S2B Kestrel, an airplane in the computer game Crimson Skies
- Kestrel, a playable character in the computer game Tom Clancy's Splinter Cell: Conviction
- Kestrel, a collection of modular armor pieces in the video game Mass Effect 2
- Kestrel, a playable character and an archer in the video game Vainglory
- Kestrel, a group of female human-vampire assassins descended from birds in the video game BloodRayne 2

=== Music ===
- Kestrel, a song by the band Scale the Summit from their album V

== Other ==
- Kestrel coal mine, a coal mine operated by Rio Tinto Coal Australia
- Kestrel (rocket launcher), a Taiwanese anti-tank weapon
- Kestrel USA, an American bicycle manufacturer
- The Melbourne Kestrels, an Australian netball team
- Viking Kestrel, a children's book imprint
