= Peter Milne =

Peter Milne may refer to:

- Peter Milne (musician) (1824–1908), Scottish violinist and composer
- Peter Milne (missionary) (1834–1924), Scottish missionary
- Peter Milne (screenwriter) (1896–1968), American screenwriter
- Peter Milne (boat designer) (1934–2008), British boat designer
- Peter Milne (visual artist) (born 1960), Australian photographer
