= Prelude =

Prelude may refer to:

== Music ==
- Prelude (music), a musical form
- Prelude (band), an English-based folk band
- Prelude Records (record label), a former New York-based dance independent record label
- Chorale prelude, a short liturgical composition for organ using a chorale as its basis

=== Albums and songs ===
- Prelude (Jack McDuff album), a 1963 album by jazz organist Brother Jack McDuff
- Prelude (Deodato album), a 1973 album by Eumir Deodato
- Prelude (The Moody Blues album), a 1987 album by The Moody Blues
- Prelude (EP), a 2017 EP by April
- Prelude, a 2021 EP by Lauren Jauregui
- "Prelude", a song by Flobots from Flobots Present... Platypus
- "Prelude", a song by Hieroglyphics from Full Circle
- "Prelude", an instrumental by Kate Bush from Aerial
- "Prelude", a song by Killswitch Engage from Killswitch Engage (2000 album)
- "Prelude", a song by the Oh Hellos from Dear Wormwood
- "Prelude", a song by Pete Townshend from All the Best Cowboys Have Chinese Eyes
- "Prelude", a song by the Sword from Used Future

=== Musical works ===
'Prelude' is a very common term as a title of a musical piece, both classical and popular. Some specific preludes are:

- Prélude à l'après-midi d'un faune, a popular orchestral piece by Debussy
- Prelude in C-sharp minor (Rachmaninoff), an 1892 piano work by Sergei Rachmaninoff
- Preludes (Chopin), a set of 24 piano pieces by Frédéric Chopin, written between 1835 and 1839
- Préludes (Debussy), two books of piano pieces by Claude Debussy written between 1909 and 1913
- Preludes (Kabalevsky), a set of 24 piano pieces, each based in a folk song
- Preludes (musical), a 2015 musical by Dave Malloy
- Les préludes, a symphonic poem by Franz Liszt

== Literature ==
- The Prelude, an epic poem by William Wordsworth
- "Prelude" (short story), a short story by New Zealand author Katherine Mansfield
- Prelude to Foundation, a 1988 novel in Isaac Asimov's Foundation series
- Preludes (Dragonlance series), two trilogies comprising a series of novels set in the Dragonlance world
- "Preludes" (poem), a poem by T. S. Eliot

== Other uses ==
- Prelude (The Righteous Gemstones), an episode of the American television series The Righteous Gemstones
- "Prelude" (Alias episode), in the TV spy drama series
- Prelude (yacht), a trailer sailer designed by Ian Proctor
- Prelude FLNG, the world's largest floating liquefied natural gas platform
- Prelude SIEM (Intrusion Detection System), an open source a security information and event management system
- Haskell Prelude, a standard module imported by default into Haskell programs; see Haskell features
- Honda Prelude, an automobile manufactured by Honda
- Sheaffer Prelude, a series of pens by the Sheaffer Pen company
- The preludes, videos released on YouTube by Swedish band iamamiwhoami
- Preludes (film series), shorts commissioned by the 2000 Toronto Film Festival
- Christmas Prelude, annual festival in Maine, U.S.
