= Beaufort (dinghy) =

1965 GRP sailing dinghy

Boat
- Crew: 2–4

Hull
- LOA: 16 ft 0 in (4.88 m)

The Beaufort is a substantial GRP sailing dinghy, with round bilges (appearing similar to a carvel smooth hull, a mainsail and a jib.

It was designed by Ian Proctor c. 1965. It is a relatively stable cruising dinghy, and is equipped with a metal centreplate.

The Beaufort sail mark is a trumpet with a black square beneath and a white "B" within the black square.
