= Ian Proctor =

British designer

Ian Douglas Ben Proctor FRSA RDI (12 July 1918 – 23 July 1992) was a British designer of boats, both sailing dinghies and cruisers. He had more than one hundred designs to his credit, from which an estimate of at least 65,000 boats were built. His pioneering aluminium mast designs also revolutionised the sport of sailing.

== Early life and education ==
Proctor was a son of Douglas McIntyre Proctor and Mary Albina Louise Proctor (née Tredwen). He was educated at Gresham's School in Holt, Norfolk. After leaving school, he studied at the University of London.

In 1943, he married Elizabeth Anne Gifford Lywood, the daughter of Air Vice-Marshal O. G. Lywood, CB, CBE. They had three sons and a daughter.

Proctor contracted Polio in Alexandria, and lived the remainder of his life with weakened lungs, arm and shoulder.

== Career ==
=== Early career ===
From 1942 to 1946, during World War II, Proctor was a Flying Officer in the Royal Air Force Volunteer Reserve. From 1947 to 1948, he was managing director of Gosport Yacht Co., then, from 1948 to 1950, he was joint editor of Yachtsman Magazine.

=== Dinghy designer ===
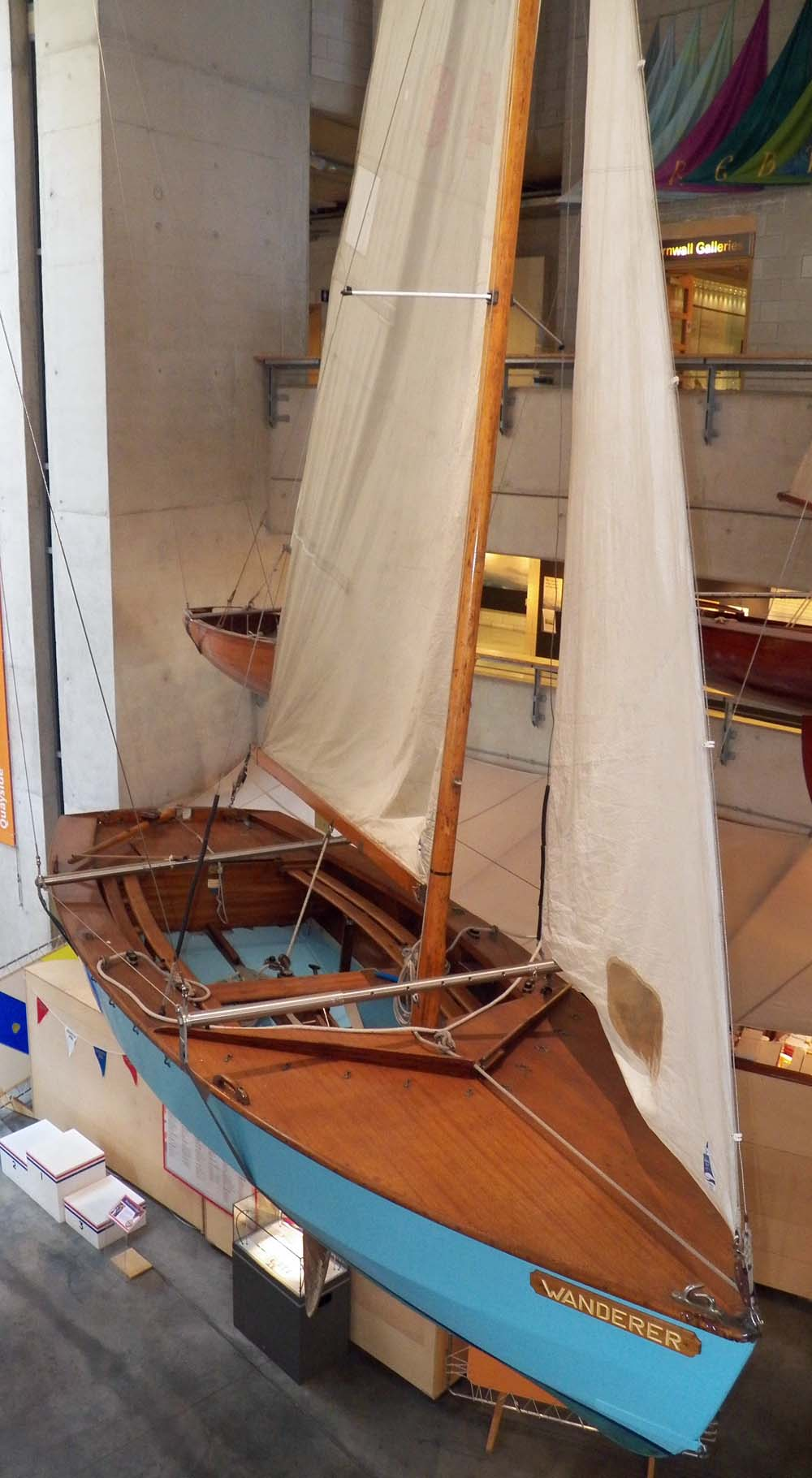
Wanderer - sail No W48, the Wayfarer class dinghy that Frank Dye sailed to Iceland and Norway. Now in National Maritime museum, Falmouth, Cornwall.

Ian Proctor first began to design dinghies professionally in 1950. The National 12 was soon followed by the Merlin Rocket. Proctor's early designs were met with immediate success, winning championships from 1950 to 1952. His design of Proctor Spars revolutionised dinghy sailing. Then in 1958 he designed the Wayfarer, which soon became a hit with sailing schools and still has a strong following in racing and cruising circles. One Wayfarer was sailed from the UK to Norway and Iceland by Frank Dye, and this boat is now on display at the National Maritime Museum, Falmouth.

The most widely known of all Ian Proctor designs has to be the Topper of which more than 49,000 have been produced to date. This was the first sailing dinghy to be produced from injection moulded plastic; a system which cost a million pounds to set up and was the largest single mold at the time. The first boats however were built from glassfibre (GRP). There is a large topper racing circuit in the UK and also like the Wayfarer has an enthusiastic racing following.

=== Yacht designer ===
Although better known for his dinghy designs and aluminium masts, Ian Proctor was also responsible for the design of several small cruisers. His first cruiser was the Seagull for Bell Woodworking, followed shortly afterwards by the Seamew. Later on there was the Nimrod, Eclipse, Pirate, and the Prelude.

=== Mast designer ===
In 1953 Ian Proctor's 'Cirrus' had an all-metal mast. Proctor quickly realised the potential of metal masts and in 1953 he designed the first all-metal tapered and extruded mast for sailing dinghies. Then in 1955 he established 'Ian Proctor Metal Masts Limited' as a commercial venture. Proctor Masts soon became the leading metal mast producers for all types of sailing craft. Indeed, by 1960, 13 different countries were using Proctor masts in the Olympics and the 1987 America's Cup featured 12 boats using Proctor masts.

Proctor Masts eventually became part of the Seldén group, and now trade as Seldén masts.

=== Writing ===
Proctor wrote extensively about sailing. As well as his earlier stint as joint editor of Yachtsman Magazine, he was, from 1950 to 1964, the yachting correspondent of the Daily Telegraph. His books included:

- Racing Dinghy Handling, 1948
- Racing Dinghy Maintenance, 1949
- Sailing: Wind and Current, 1950
- Boats for Sailing, 1968
- Sailing Strategy, 1977

== Ian Proctor Designs ==
- Adventuress
- Beaufort
- Blue Peter
- Bosun
- CL 16
- Gull
- Jiffy beginners lateen rig
- Kestrel, the first dinghy designed to be built in glass fibre.
- Leprechaun, Built by Thomas Thompson of Carlow and adopted by Blessington Sailing Club. (About 10 boats built.)
- Marlin
- Merlin Rocket (not the only designer as the Merlin Rocket is a development class)
- Minisail
- Eclipse, commissioned by Newbridge Yachts.
- National 18 (1968)
- Nimrod, commissioned by Westerly
- Osprey, raced as a One-Design class and despite the cosmetic improvements that have occurred since the designs inception, older boats can still (and often do) compete at the top end of the fleet.
- Pirate, commissioned by Rydgeway Marine
- Prelude, commissioned by Rydgeway Marine
- Seagull, commissioned by Bell Woodworking
- Seamew, commissioned by Bell Woodworking
- SigneT
- Tempest
- Topper
- Wanderer
- Wayfarer

== Honours and awards ==
- Royal Designer for Industry
- Fellow of the Royal Society of Arts
- Yachtsman of the Year, 1965. Unusually awarded for his work as a designer rather as a noted yachtsman.
- Council of Industrial Design Award, 1967
- Design Council Awards, 1977, 1980
