= National Maritime Museum Cornwall =

Museum in Cornwall, England

Coordinates: 50°09′05″N 5°03′42″W

- Gwithti Morek Kenedhlek Kernow
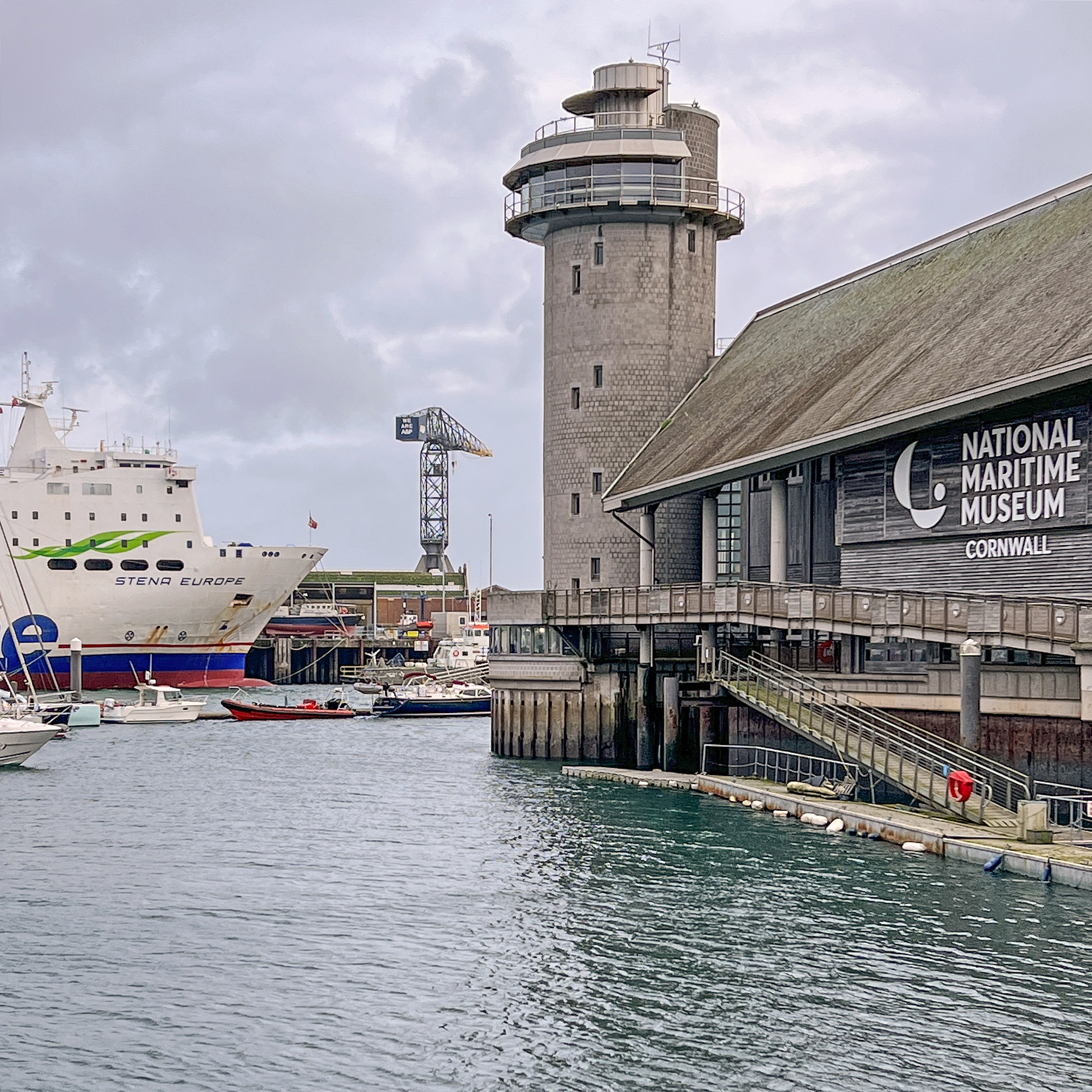

- Location within Cornwall
- Established: February 2003
- Location: Falmouth, Cornwall
- Type: Maritime museum
- Website: nmmc.co.uk

The National Maritime Museum, Cornwall (Cornish: Gwithti Morek Kenedhlek Kernow) is located in a harbourside building at Falmouth in Cornwall, England. The building was designed by architect M. J. Long, following an architectural design competition managed by RIBA Competitions. It is an independent charitable trust and, unlike other national museums, receives no direct government support.

Its mission is to promote an understanding of boats and their place in people's lives, and of the maritime heritage of Cornwall. It does this by presenting the story of the sea, boats and the maritime history of Cornwall. It maintains the National Small Boats Register (NSBR).

== History ==
The museum grew out of the FIMI (Falmouth International Maritime Initiative) partnership which was created in 1992 and was the result of collaboration between the National Maritime Museum, Greenwich, and the former Cornwall Maritime Museum in Falmouth. The trustees of the earlier museum, Tony Pawlyn (1942-2024), George Hogg and others secured funding for a larger museum dedicated to Cornwall's maritime heritage. The construction project required funding of £21.5 million to complete. The construction of the museum was partly funded by the Heritage Lottery Fund, the SW Regional Development Agency, and through private sponsorship. New objects began arriving in 2001 to supplement the previous Cornish collection, including the 103 boats from the small-boat collection of the Maritime Museum in London.

The museum opened in February 2003. In its first year of operation, there were some 168,000 visitors.

In January 2025, the museum closed temporarily for six weeks to allow for repairs to the building as a result of leaks.

== Boats ==
The Museum manages the National Small Boat Collection, which came from the National Maritime Museum in Greenwich, in addition to its own collection of Cornish and other boats. Famous boats on show in its collection include:

- Waterlily, a Thames steamboat built by Thornycrofts in 1866
- Fricka, a gentleman's day sailor built by William Fife
- Champions like the Ventnor planing hydrofoil; the Flying Dutchman Supercalifragilisticexpialidocious (Superdocious for short) in which Rodney Pattisson won a gold medal at the Mexico Olympics; Rita, the Finn in which Ben Ainslie won Olympic gold medals in 2004, 2008, and 2012; and "Defender II"
- Thunder and Lightning the International 14 which was the first boat to use a trapeze competitively
- Early examples of popular sailing dinghies like Mirror No.1, Firefly No.1 and Dart No. 1
- Curlew, the Falmouth Quay Punt in which Tim and Pauline Carr sailed to the Antarctic
- Britannia rowboat, in which John Fairfax rowed across the Atlantic in 1969
- Wanderer-W48, a Wayfarer (dinghy), in which Frank Dye sailed to Iceland and to Norway from Scotland (surviving four capsizes and a broken mast during a Force 9 storm) [Ref-7].

The museum is the country's premier museum for boats and maintains the National Small Boat Register (NSBR) of small boats (under 33-foot) and invites owners of historic craft to register them.

== Cornwall's maritime history ==
Three galleries are devoted to the maritime history of Cornwall. These cover topics such as Cornish fishing, trading, boatbuilding, wrecks, and emigration.

The Falmouth gallery also tells the story of:

- The Packet ships which operated out of Falmouth and which took the mails to the growing empire from 1668 until 1851
- The life of Falmouth in the late 19th century when "to Falmouth for Orders" was a familiar instruction to ships' captains and the harbour was filled with vessels returning to Europe from around the world; and
- The 20th century when Falmouth was a jumping-off point for D-Day and the first and last port of call for sailors like Robin Knox-Johnston, the first man to sail solo around the world, and Ellen MacArthur who broke the solo round the world sailing record having left from, and returned to the museum

== Main galleries ==
The museum has the following galleries:

- The Main Hall – containing the Survival Zone
- The Hold – with changing bi-annual exhibitions
- Look-out – with views over Falmouth harbour
- The Quarterdeck – used for temporary exhibitions and home to the Treasure Island Play Zone
- The Bridge – with changing exhibitions
- Boat building and its history
- Tidal Zone – with underwater views of Falmouth harbour
- Waterfront – the small indoor lake, with fans creating a gust for radio-controlled model yachts
- Pontoon – with a changing display of boats on the water
- Maritime Cornwall

- Falmouth Gallery
- Cornwall and the Sea
- Cornish Quayside

== Exhibitions ==
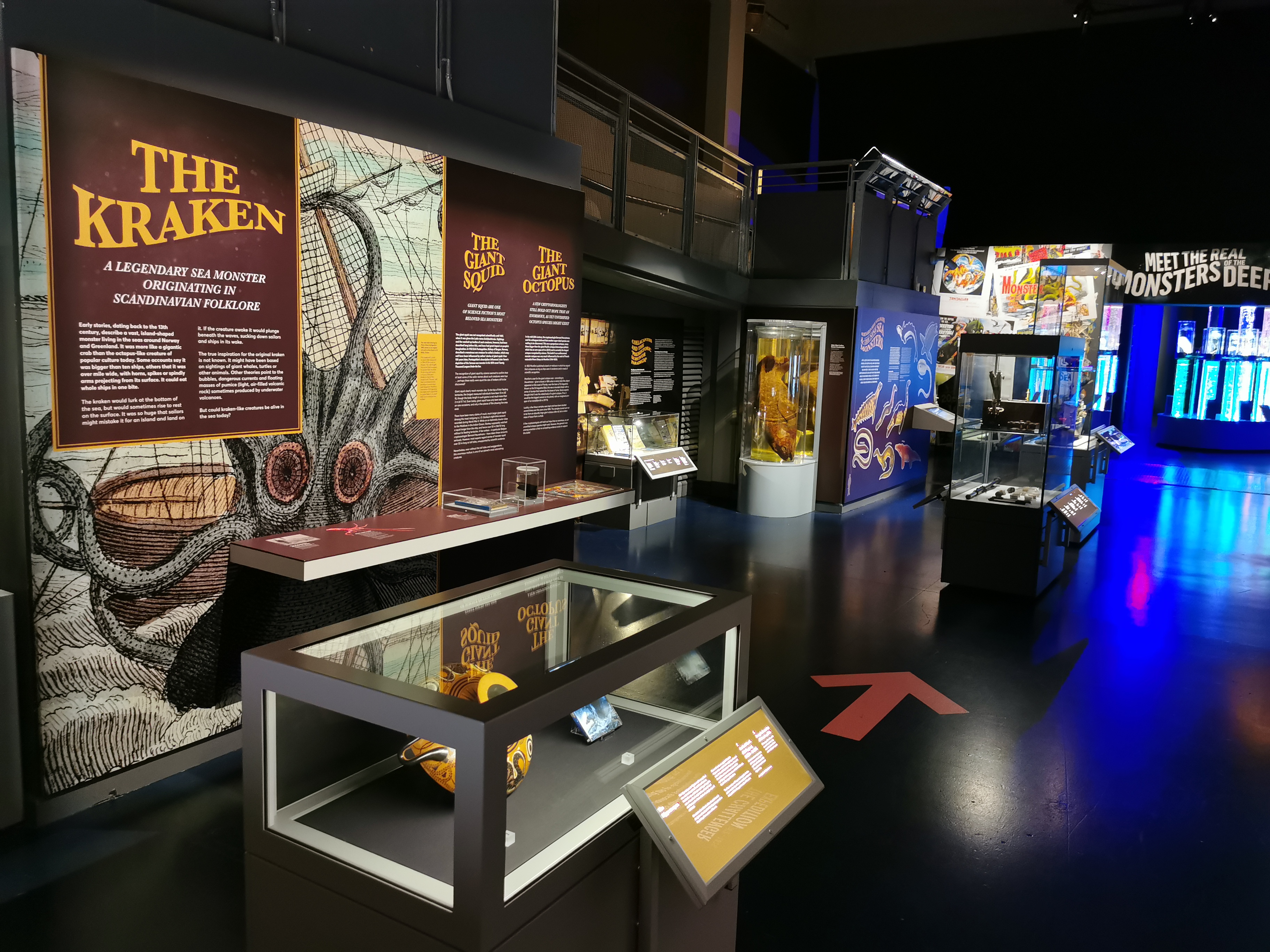
"Monsters of the Deep" exhibition (July 2020 – January 2023)

The museum has a programme of annual exhibitions including titles such as:

- 2004 – The Will to Win – an exhibition of Olympic and competitive boats
- 2005 – Team Philips and Surf's Up – exhibitions about the round the world project and the history of surfing in the UK
- 2006 – Endurance and Survival
- 2007 – Mad Dogs, and Englishmen? – eccentric boats
- 2008 – Under the Sea – diving and man's attempt to work underwater
- 2009 – Titanic, Honour and Glory
- 2010 – Lighthouses – Life on the Rocks
- 2012 – Search and Rescue – the work of the Rescue Services
- 2015 – Viking Voyagers
- 2017 – Tattoo: British Tattoo History Revealed and Bligh-Myth, Man and Mutiny
- 2018 – Titanic Stories
- 2020 – Monsters of the Deep: Science Fact and Fiction
- 2023 – Pirates: Explore Beneath the Surface
- 2025 – SURF! 100 years of Waveriding in Cornwall

There is also a programme of temporary exhibitions, talks, and activities.

== Other facilities ==
The museum has a waterside café overlooking the harbour, a shop, space for temporary exhibitions, and the Sunley Lecture Theatre.

=== Bartlett Library ===
The Bartlett Library is the centre of the museum's research and provides answers on maritime matters for specialists and amateurs alike. As well as holding many of the original port records for Falmouth, it has over 16,000 books and a large number of magazines, cuttings, and illustrations.

== Awards ==
The National Maritime Museum Cornwall has been nominated for and won a number of awards including:

- 2004 – nominated for a Silver Award for most outstanding environmental design
- 2005 – ADAPT Trust Awards for Excellence in Access for Disabled People
- 2013 – Silver Award for Best UK Heritage Attraction at British Travel Awards
- 2014 – Best Museum in Cornwall – Cornwall Today Awards
- 2014 – Silver Award for Best UK Heritage Attraction at British Travel Awards
- 2014 – Marsh Trust Award
- 2014 – Learning outside the classroom quality badge
- 2014 – Winner of The Telegraph Family Friendly Museum Award
- 2015 – Winner of the Sandford Award for outstanding quality of education work
- 2017 – Best Gallery – What's On Cornwall Awards
- 2021 – Silver in the Cornwall Tourism Awards
- 2021 – Winner of the Sandford Award for outstanding quality of education work
- 2024 – Finalist – Best Online Shop, Association of Cultural Enterprises
- 2025 – Finalist – Silver - Large Visitor Attraction of the Year, Cornwall Tourism Awards
