= CL 16 =

Sailboat class

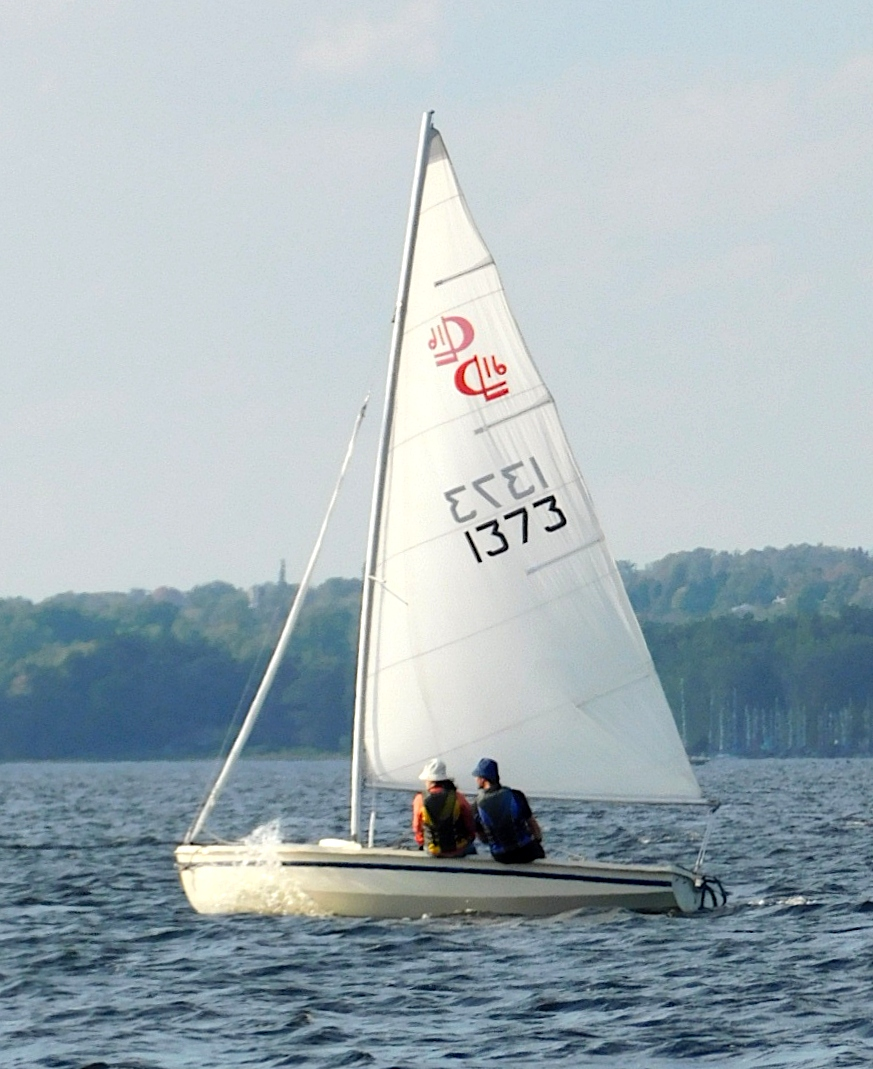

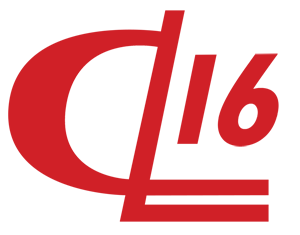

Development
- Designer: Ian Proctor, Graham Dodd and George Blanchard
- Location: Canada
- Year: 1968
- No. built: Over 2600
- Builder: C&L Boatworks
- Role: Day sailer-cruiser
- Name: CL 16

Boat
- Crew: two
- Displacement: 365 lb (166 kg)
- Draft: 3.83 ft (1.17 m) with centreboard down

Hull
- Type: monohull
- Construction: fibreglass
- LOA: 16.00 ft (4.88 m)
- LWL: 14.83 ft (4.52 m)
- Beam: 6.08 ft (1.85 m)

Hull appendages
- Keel: centreboard
- Rudder: transom-mounted rudder

Rig
- Rig type: Bermuda rig

Sails
- Sailplan: fractional rigged sloop
- Mainsail area: 95 sq ft (8.8 m^{2})
- Jib/genoa area: 46.7 sq ft (4.34 m^{2})
- Total sail area: 141.7 sq ft (13.16 m^{2})

Racing
- D-PN: 97

The CL 16, or CL16, is a Canadian sailing dinghy that was designed by Ian Proctor (1918-1992), Graham Dodd and George Blanchard, as a cruiser and daysailer, and first built in 1968.

The CL 16 is a development of Proctor's 1957 Wayfarer design and is identical in dimensions and shape, with differences only in interior details. Proctor considered it an unauthorized copy.

== Production ==
The design was first built by C&L Boatworks in 1968 in Belleville, Ontario and more recently in Fort Erie, Ontario. It is no longer in production.

== Design ==
Henry Croce and Ken Lofthouse of Mahone Bay, Nova Scotia started as importers of the wooden Wayfarer, until a labour strike in the UK cut off the supply. They had the boat adapted for fibreglass construction and started their own production line as C&L. Ian Proctor considered it an unauthorized copy of the Wayfarer.

The CL 16 is a recreational sailboat, built predominantly of fibreglass, with mahogany wood trim. It has double-chined; planing hull; a fractional sloop rig; a raked stem; a plumb transom; a transom-hung, kick-up, fibreglass rudder with an aluminum head, controlled by a tiller and a retractable centreboard. Unusually for a dinghy the mainsail is equipped with one set of reefing points. The boat displaces 365 lb (166 kg).

The boat has a draft of 3.83 ft (1.17 m) with the centreboard extended and 0.67 ft (0.20 m) with it retracted, allowing beaching or ground transportation on a trailer.

A motor bracket is a factory option, to allow the boat to be fitted with a small outboard motor for docking and manoeuvring.

The boat is designed to be sailed by a crew of two, but can accommodate up to six people.

For sailing the design may be equipped with a spinnaker and a trapeze.

== Operational history ==
In a review the Outer Harbour Centreboard Club wrote:

[T]he 16 has proven itself to be a remarkable dinghy that is able to perform as well as it can last. Every 16 was built to last for the long haul; hand laid up using the best materials, outfitted with high quality durable rigging and fittings and backed by the builder ... This unchanged design is the 16's greatest selling point – a product that has lasted more than 40 years relatively unchanged obviously is the right design and allows for all CL16s no matter what year to compete and its sailors are able to talk about every boat with out worrying. The continuity of the 16 assures resale value should that time come. The present day 16 is an attractive well mannered proper little sailboat.

== See also ==
- List of sailing boat types
