= Peter Milne (boat designer) =

British boat designer

Peter Antony Milne (20 September 1934 – 23 May 2008) was a British boat designer. He designed more than forty craft, including the Fireball, Skipper and Javelin dinghies.

Milne was born in Stockport, Cheshire and was educated at St John's College, Hurstpierpoint. He also served as editor of Classic Boat magazine.
