= Wayfarer (dinghy) =

Wooden or fibreglass dinghy

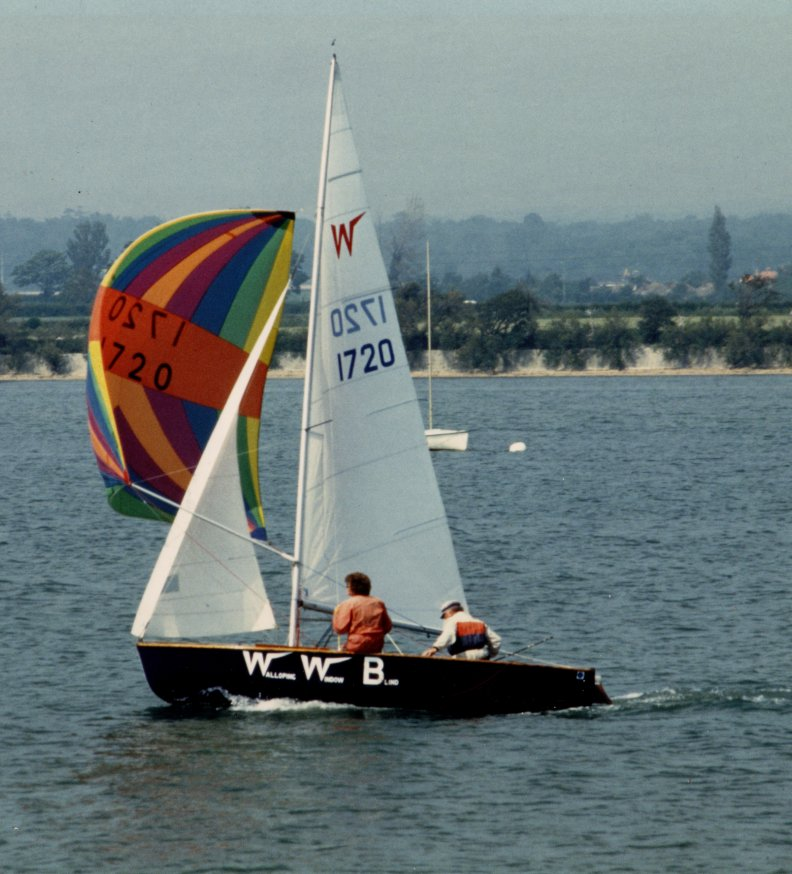
- Walloping Window Blind

Development
- Designer: Ian Proctor
- Design: One-Design

Boat
- Crew: 2
- Draft: .203 m (8.0 in); 1.169 m (3 ft 10.0 in)

Hull
- Type: Monohull
- Construction: GRP with wood trim Cold moulded plywood Composite (Wood/GRP)
- Hull weight: 169 kg (373 lb)
- LOA: 4.827 m (15.84 ft)
- Beam: 1.855 m (6 ft 1.0 in)

Rig
- Rig type: Fractional Bermuda or Marconi rig
- Mast height: 6.78 m (22.2 ft)

Sails
- Mainsail area: 8.83 m^{2} (95.0 sq ft)
- Jib/genoa area: 2.78 m^{2} (29.9 sq ft)
- Spinnaker area: 13.5 m^{2} (145 sq ft)

Rating
- D-PN: 91.6
- RYA PN: 1109

The Wayfarer is a wooden or fibreglass hulled fractional Bermuda rigged sailing dinghy of great versatility; it can be used for short 'day boat' trips, for longer cruises and for racing. Over 11,000 have been produced as of 2016.

The boat is 15 feet 10 inches (4.83 m) long, and broad and deep enough for three adults to comfortably sail for several hours. Longer trips are undertaken by enthusiasts, notably Frank Dye who sailed W48 'Wanderer' from Scotland to Iceland and Norway, crossing the North Sea twice. The Wayfarer's size, stability and seaworthiness have made it popular with sailing schools, and led it to be used as a family boat in a wide variety of locations.

A cruising dinghy, Wayfarers are also raced with a (2026) Portsmouth Number of 1107.

From the original wooden design by Ian Proctor in 1957 many subsequent versions of the Wayfarer have been produced. There is also a double-hulled Canadian clone, known as the CL 16, featuring a simplified rig (Note: E.g., the mast is non-tapered, and the hull and cockpit are slightly wider) but otherwise identical. Genuine Wayfarers can be identified by the "W" symbol on their sails. (Note: Not to be confused with the "W" on the sail of the Wanderer (sailing dinghy) a related but smaller boat, which Ian Proctor designed for and with the input of Margaret Dye, updated by Phil Morrison and produced by the same builder of the Mark IV, Hartley Boats. The "Wanderer" is named for Frank and Margaret Dye's first Wayfarer. Dye, Margaret (Summer 2013). "My Life With Frank Dye and Wayfarer Wanderer". Dinghy Cruising (Bulletin 219). Dinghy Cruising Association: 2. Archived from the original on 12 November 2013.)

The sail plan consists of a Bermuda rig with a main, jib, and symmetrical spinnaker. The boat uses a retractable centreboard. An optional asymmetric spinnaker and spinnaker chute is available; also available is a "sail patch" which provides flotation for the mast in the event of a capsize (and particularly to prevent the boat inverting – Turtling). (Note: Intended for "rough weather or novice racers.""Hartley Wayfarer Mark IV". Archived from the original on 12 November 2013. Although there are those who believe that some models of Wayfarer are 'special cases' that make them candidates for masthead flotation, particularly whilst cruising (where no safety boats are in the area, as may be true in a race)."Masthead buoyancy alternative".)

One-design racing is active and competitive — regionally, nationally and internationally.

== Versions ==
Over its history several versions of the Wayfarer have been developed, as follows.

=== Mark I Wood ===
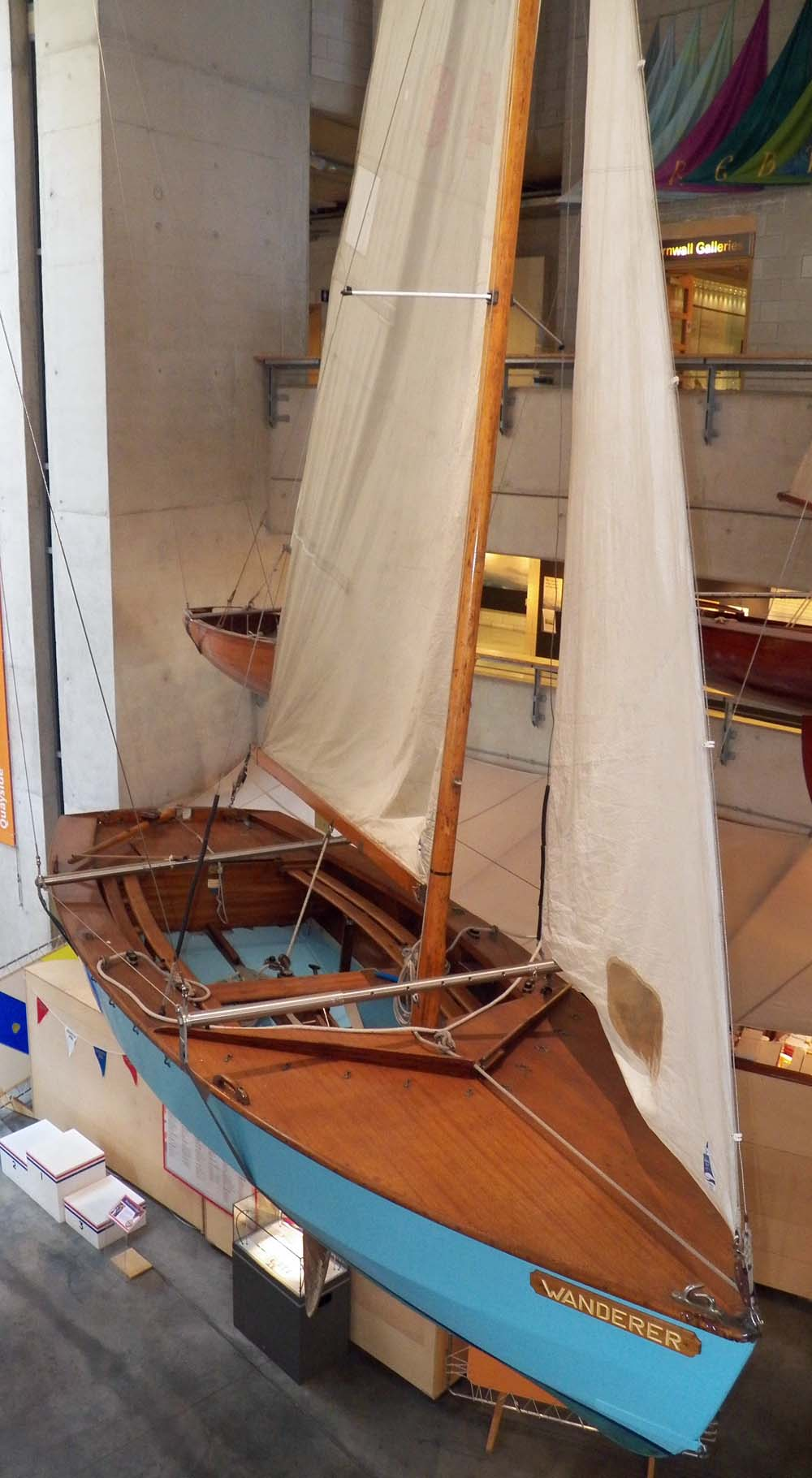
Wanderer - sail No W48, the open sailing dinghy of the Wayfarer class that Frank Dye sailed to Iceland in 1963 and Norway in 1964. Now in UK National Maritime museum, Falmouth, Cornwall.

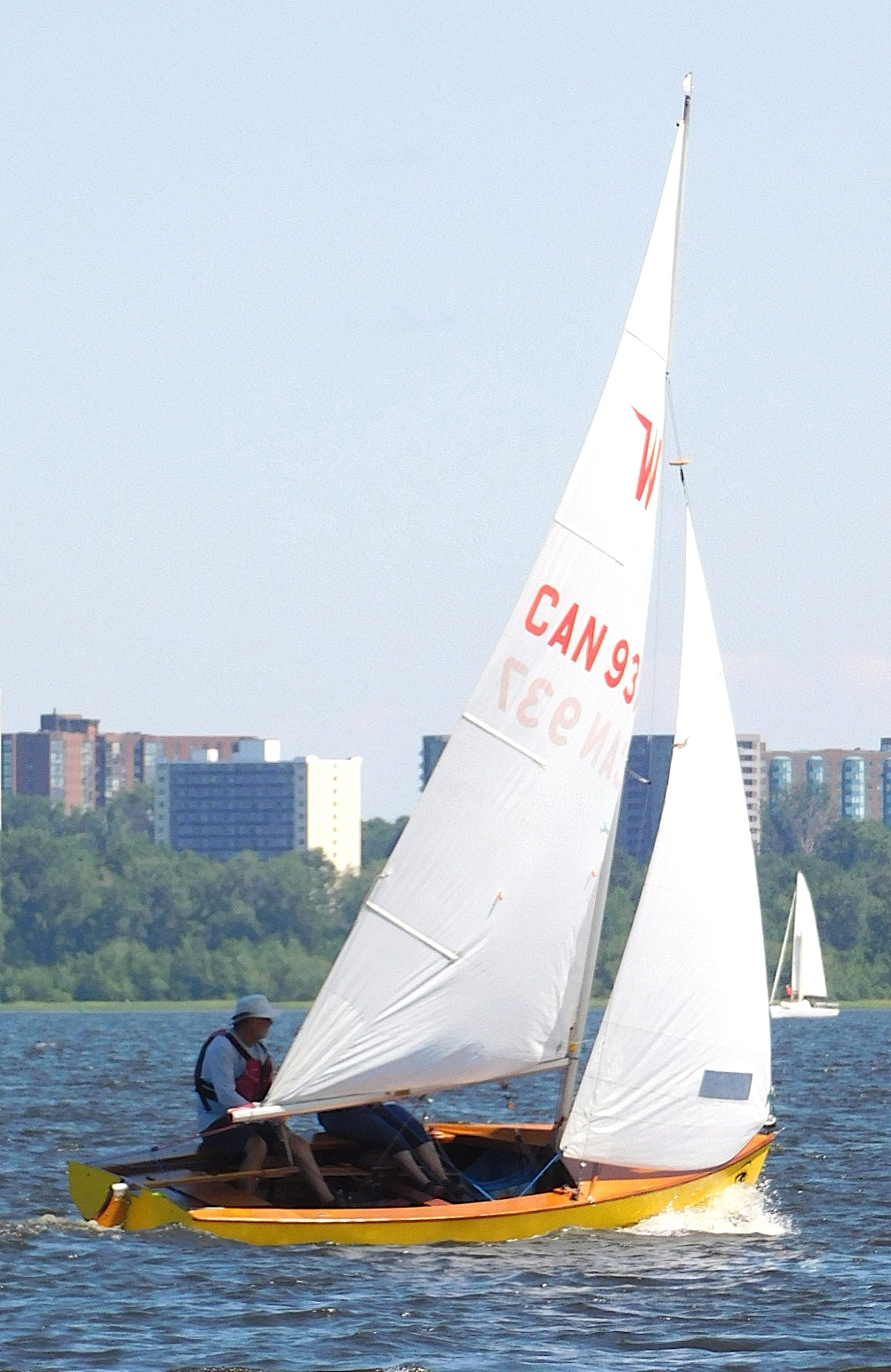
Wooden Wayfarer

This was the original wooden Wayfarer designed in 1957 to be manufactured by Small Craft Limited and also by amateur builders working from authorised kits, using the measured templates and jigs supplied, with a hull and deck made from plywood. Frank Dye's famous W48 Wanderer was of course of this type, a testament to its robust construction. The boat is now in the collection of the National Maritime Museum Cornwall in Falmouth. Other boats of this model are still racing after 60 years. The hull is of a 'three plank' construction, that is with two chines. This provides a good compromise between stability and ease of construction. Both forward and aft buoyancy compartments are fitted with large watertight hatches and this provides ample stowage space for cruising. The large floor space with flat floorboards and good clearance under thwart makes the Mark I a comfortable boat for two people to sleep in, when a boom-tent is erected for shelter. The mast is held in a tabernacle, which when rigged with a tackle on the forestay allows the mast to be lowered to pass beneath bridges. This feature was retained in subsequent models, as was the hull shape.

=== Mark I GRP ===
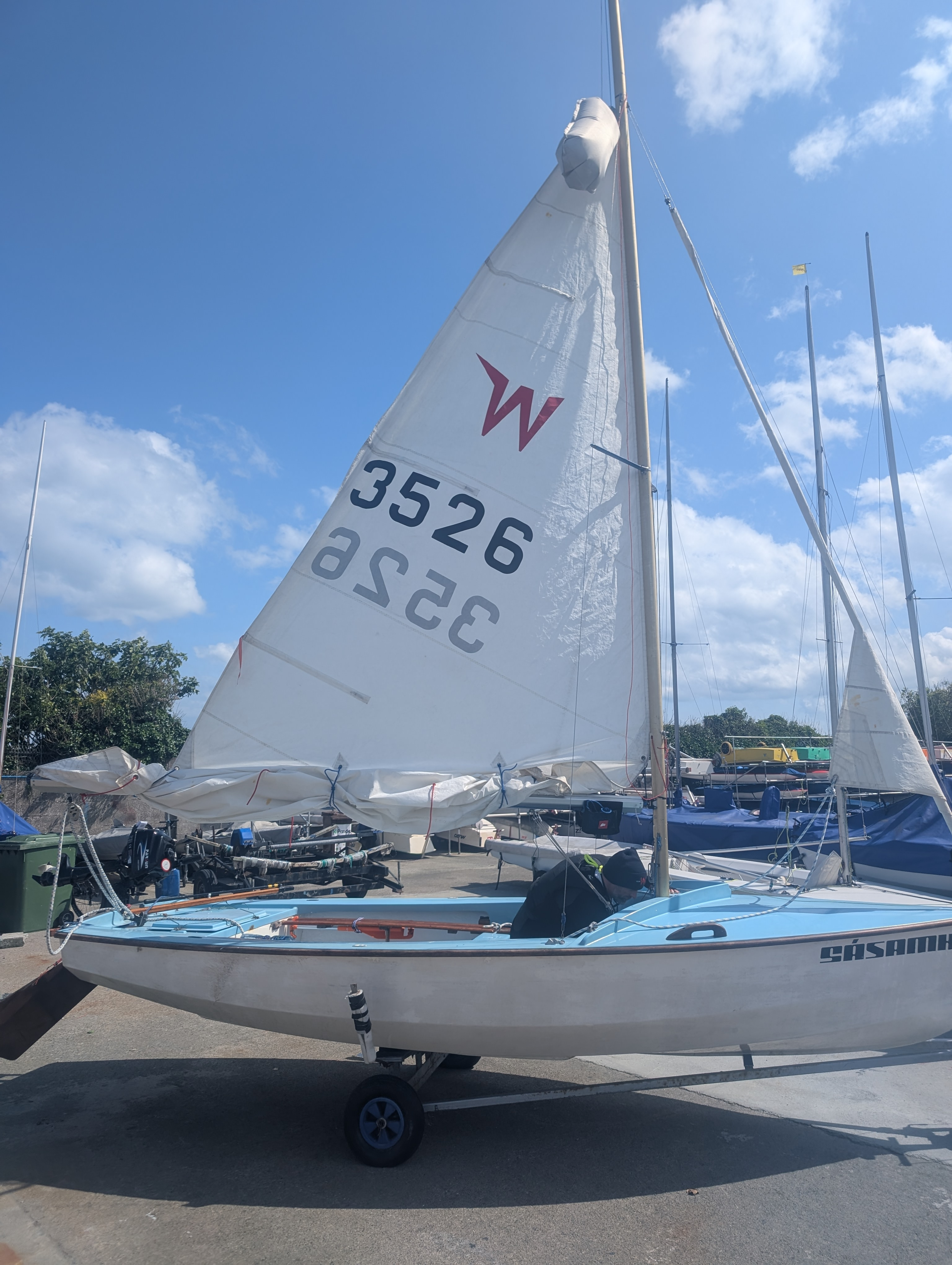
A Mark 1 GRP rigged for heavy weather sailing. Its main sail has two reefs, its jib is furled, and it is equipped with a mast float.

A Glass Reinforced Plastic version was introduced in 1965 and was similar in layout to the wooden boat. Over two thousand copies of this model were made and many are still in use through the world. In contrast to other GRP models, this version has a large hatch to the forward buoyancy compartment useful for stowage when cruising, and a forward bulkhead extending right up to the foredeck level. The Mark I has no side buoyancy, and consequently does not suffer from a tendency to invert when capsized that plagued later models. The Mark I was also available as a composite model with a GRP hull and bulkheads but plywood fore- and side-decks.

=== Mark II GRP ===
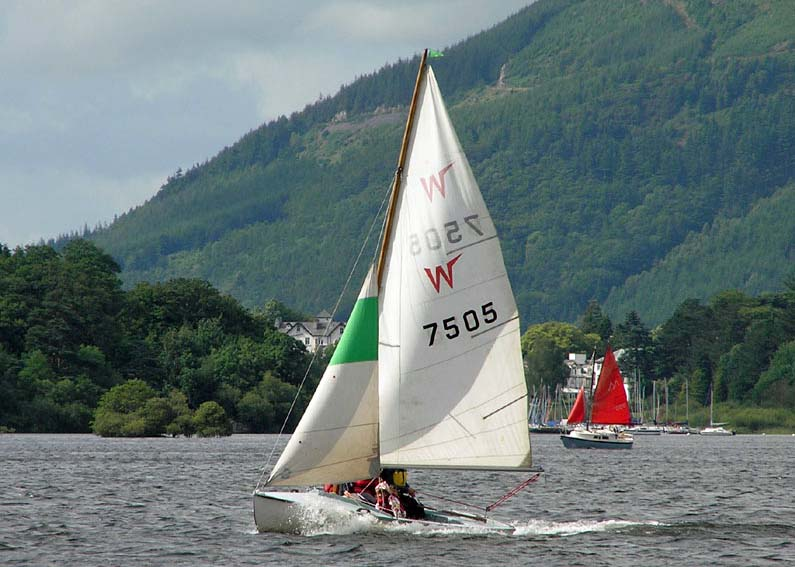
MK II Wayfarer dinghy on Derwentwater, Cumbria.

The Mark II was introduced in 1974 supposedly as an improvement. The front and rear buoyancy tanks were built into the hull before bonding on the deck. The forward buoyancy compartment has a gap above it and under the foredeck. This would have been useful for a spinnaker chute, but class regulations of the time did not allow that. The forward compartment had a small circular inspection hatch thus removing much of the useful dry stowage space. Side buoyancy compartments gave this model a tendency to invert, and those owned by sailing schools soon sported socks filled with polystyrene to provide a righting moment when capsized. Reduced clearance under the thwart made this boat uncomfortable to sleep in.

A version with a self draining cockpit, the Mark II SD, was introduced in 1986. This was especially suitable for boats kept on moorings. However, the buoyancy sealed in the floor increases the inverting tendency and, when righted after a capsize, the trapped water causes instability. To help overcome this drain tubes through the aft tank were later introduced.

=== Mark 1A ===
This GRP model was introduced in 1987, combining the structural improvements of the Mark II with greater storage space in the bow. A horizontal bulkhead divides the bow buoyancy tank, and both the upper and lower sections have large access hatches creating secure stowage spaces.

=== Wayfarer Plus S ===
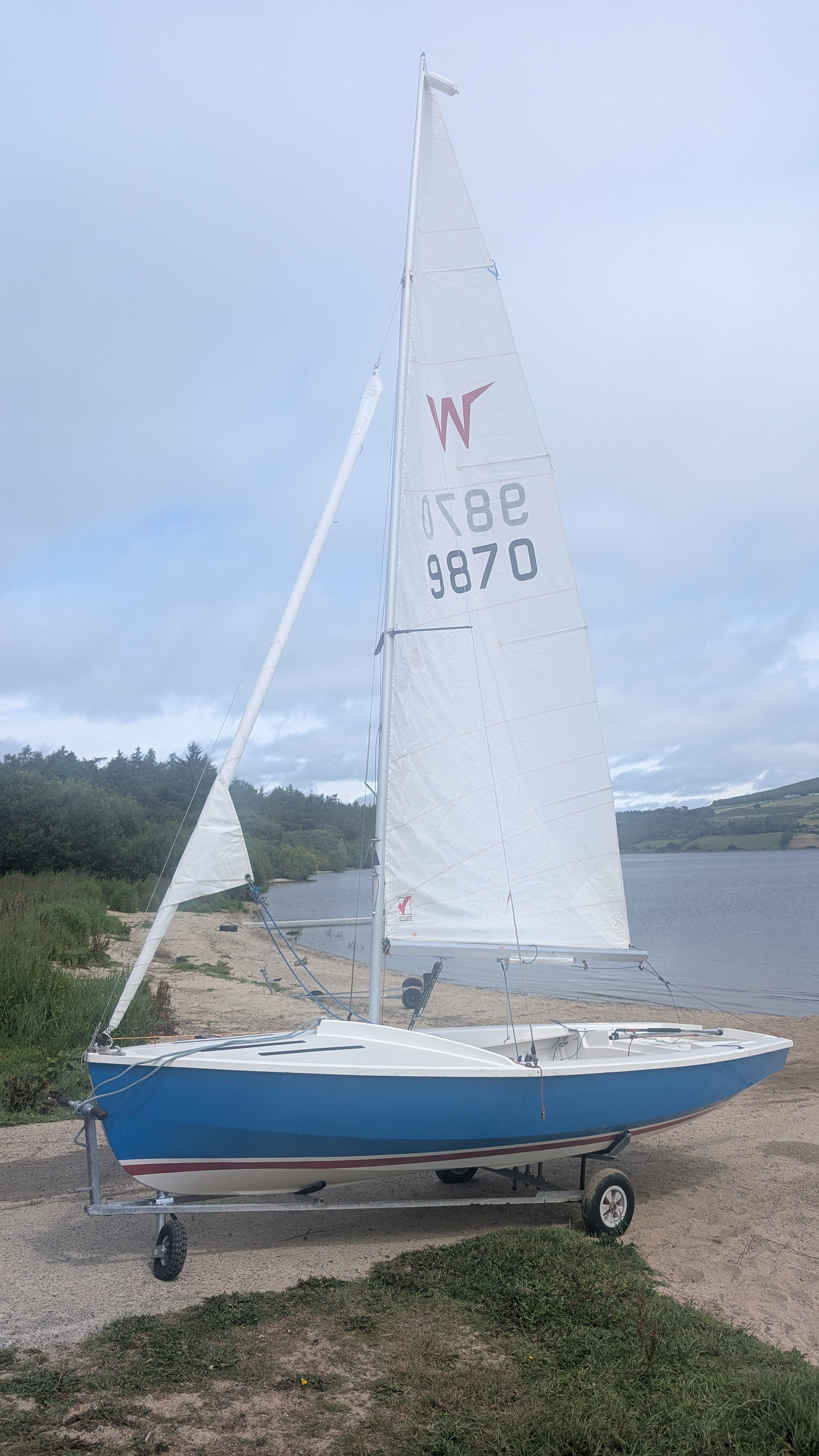
A Wayfarer Plus S

First produced in 1991 the Wayfarer Plus S was made with a sandwich construction for the hull and chines. This produced a boat that could compete with the original wooden boats in stiffness and weight, while having the maintenance advantages of GRP. The forward tank has a full-height bulkhead like the Mark I. The cruising version has a large hatch in the bulkhead to allow the tank to be used for stowage.

=== Wayfarer World ===
The Wayfarer World was introduced in 1997 and was designed as a collaboration between Ian Proctor and his son Keith. Made in GRP with no woodwork it has a removable aft storage tank, a self draining cockpit, and a spinnaker chute. The rudder stock is of aluminium alloy. Until the MkIV this was the only version with an asymmetric spinnaker, although it can not be used in class races [except in the UK]. It has proved successful in both racing and cruising, including a North Sea crossing 1998.

=== Wayfarer World S Type ===
The Wayfarer World S Type is generally similar to the Wayfarer World but is made using the same foam sandwich construction as the Wayfarer Plus S.

=== Mark III (North America only) ===
Built by Abbott Boats in Canada, production stopped in 2006 after a fire in which the molds were destroyed. The company sustained a multimillion-dollar loss.

An updated version (incorporating the 2008 design improvements by Phil Morrison of the Mark IV) is scheduled to begin future production in Canada; the "Wayfarer Cruiser" includes an optional asymmetrical spinnaker, which would not be allowed in racing.

=== Mark IV (Hartley Wayfarer) ===
Introduced in 2007 the MkIV was a significant redesign by Phil Morrison. The design is intended to be more modern and spacious inside, and easier to right and drain after a capsize. This version was also designed to be "as fast as but no faster than the fastest" of the older Wayfarers. The Mark IV is also available in the United States.

It has been pointed out by some experienced sailors that designs closer to the original Mark 1 boats are more suitable for cruising because of their better stability and storage spaces. The latest versions are more prone to turtling and righting them can be very difficult. This is the reason many cruising sailors prefer the older Wayfarer versions.

== See also ==
- CL 16
- Mistral 16
- National Maritime Museum Cornwall

== Books ==
- Dye, Frank; Dye, Margaret (1977). Ocean-crossing wayfarer: to Iceland and Norway in an open boat [in a 16ft Open Dinghy]. Newton Abbott North Pomfret, Vt: David & Charles. ISBN 0-7153-7371-4.
- Dye, Frank (February 2001). Sailing to the Edge of Fear (First Thus ed.). Halifax, Nova Scotia: Nimbus Pub Ltd. p. 240. ISBN 1551092832. ISBN 978-1551092836
- Dye, Margaret (2001). Dinghy cruising: the enjoyment of wandering afloat. London: Adlard Coles Nautical. ISBN 0-7136-5714-6.
- Hughes, Lee (16 April 2004). The Biggest Boat I Could Afford: 4000 kilometres with a damn fool in a dinghy. Auckland, New Zealand: Random House NZ. ISBN 1-86941-608-2.
- Kattmergan, Jon; Schönborn, Al; Hughes, Derwyn; McNamara, Mike. Wayfarer Racing: rig for racing; racing techniques; strategy and tactics (PDF). UKWA Wayfarer; Wayfarer Institute of Technology.
