= Fireball (dinghy) =

Sailboat class

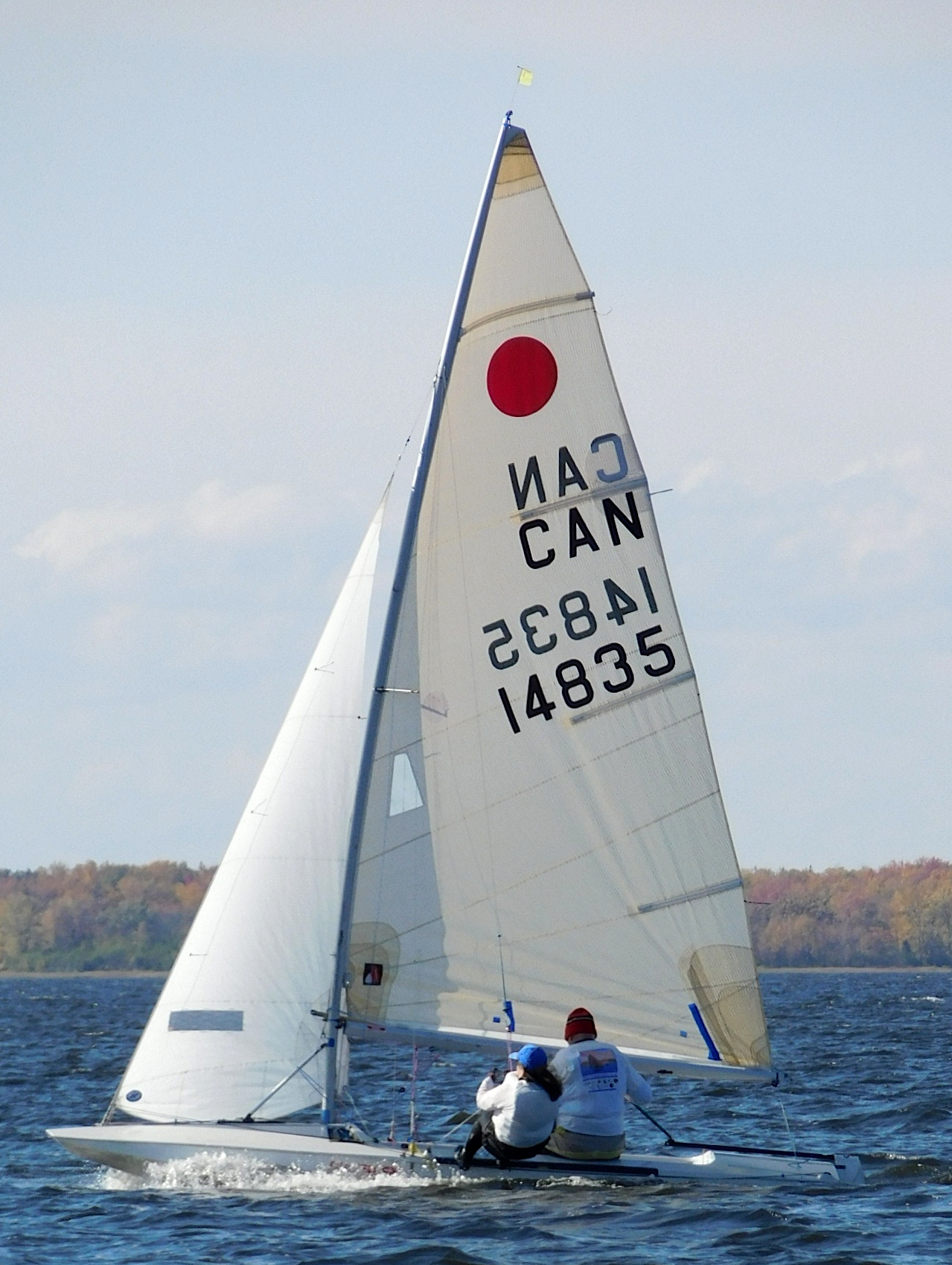

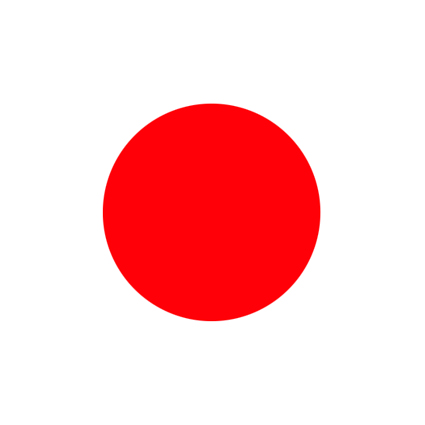

Development
- Designer: Peter Milne
- Location: United Kingdom
- Year: 1962
- No. built: 125,000
- Builders: Rondar Raceboats; Nautivela; Chippendale Boats; Duvoisin Nautique; Weathermark Sailboats; Winder Boats
- Role: One-design racer
- Name: Fireball

Boat
- Crew: two
- Displacement: 170 lb (77 kg)
- Draft: 4.00 ft (1.22 m) with centreboard down
- Trapeze: single

Hull
- Type: Monohull
- Construction: Plywood or fiberglass
- LOA: 16.17 ft (4.93 m)
- LWL: 13.25 ft (4.04 m)
- Beam: 4.42 ft (1.35 m)

Hull appendages
- Keel: centreboard
- Rudder: transom-mounted rudder

Rig
- Rig type: Bermuda rig

Sails
- Sailplan: Fractional rigged sloop
- Mainsail area: 87.5 sq ft (8.13 m^{2})
- Jib/genoa area: 35.5 sq ft (3.30 m^{2})
- Spinnaker area: 140 sq ft (13 m^{2})
- Upwind sail area: 123.00 sq ft (11.427 m^{2})

Racing
- D-PN: 85.6
- RYA PN: 959

The Fireball is a British sailing dinghy that was designed by Peter Milne as a one-design racer and first built in 1962.

== Production ==
In the past the design has been built by Rondar Raceboats of the United Kingdom, Nautivela of Italy, Chippendale Boats in the UK and Duvoisin Nautique in France. Today it is built in the UK by both Weathermark Sailboats and Winder Boats. Over 125,000 boats have been completed.

== Design ==
The Fireball is a recreational racing sailboat, originally designed to be built of wood for the amateur builder. Today most new Fireballs are made predominantly of fibreglass.

It has a fractional sloop rig with aluminum spars. The hull is a single hard chine scow design, with a retractable centreboard, a vertical transom, a transom-hung, kick-up rudder controlled by a tiller, with a tiller extension for hiking out. The boat displaces 170 lb (77 kg) and can be equipped with a spinnaker and trapeze.

The boat has a draft of 4.00 ft (1.22 m) with the centreboard extended. With it retracted the boat can be beached or transported on a trailer or car roof rack.

The design has adopted changes over time. In 1966 construction of fibreglass was permitted. The use of a single crew trapeze was added in 1965. The sails and hull are controlled, but changes to the rigging are permitted and mast chocks and struts have been used in the past.

The design has a North American Portsmouth Yardstick racing average handicap of 85.6, with an RYA Portsmouth of 956. It is normally raced with a crew of two sailors.

== Operational history ==
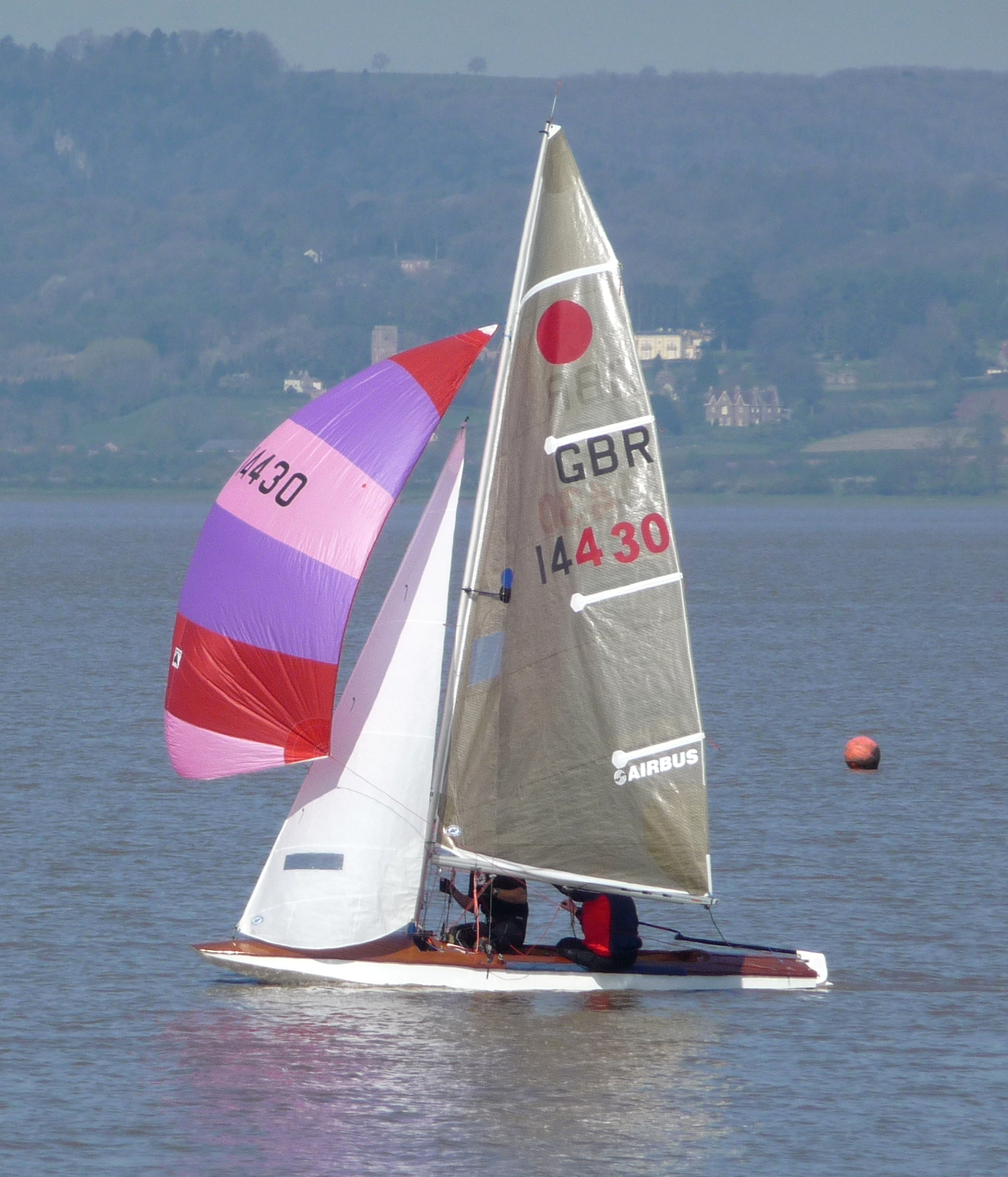
Fireball flying a spinnaker

The Fireball was granted International Yacht Racing Union international status in 1970.

The design is supported by a class club, the International Fireball Class.

The Fireball is raced worldwide, with the largest fleets in Australia, Canada, France, South Africa, Sweden, the United Kingdom and the United States.

A review in Yachts and Yachting magazine in March 1962 concluded, "she is good for inland water or the sea. Her performance has proved intriguing for expert helmsmen, yet she is stable enough to be kind to the clumsy novice."

In a 1994 review Richard Sherwood wrote, the "Fireball is a high-performance dinghy, not as fast as an International 505 or Flying Dutchman, but allowing a great deal of latitude in the positioning and adoption of all gear except sails and hull ... The (usually) high-cut jibs and the small spinnaker require less strength to control, so that many successful racing crews have had women members."

In a 2012 review in Yachts and Yachting magazine, Toby Heppell wrote, "The Fireball might look sticky in light winds, but can skate along quite nicely if the water is flat – predictably, that uncompromising bow will not cope so well with insufficient wind and chop. Best of all, Fireballs love to plane which is the root reason why many people love to sail dinghies. On a smooth surface you should get lift-off from around Force 3 on both downwind and upwind legs. Further up the wind scale, Fireball sailors reckon they are still racing when everyone else has gone home ... That’s what sailing a Fireball is about. A boat for everyday sailors that can provide enjoyable racing from about age 16 to 60 plus. Forty years on our verdict is that the Fireball is still a load of fun to sail."

Writer Paula Irish included the design as one of her 2018 list of "25 Best Beginner Sailing Dinghies". She wrote, "if you want the added excitement of a trapeze boat, with an acceptance that you may find it trickier, the Fireball is a good option with entry-level boats from just a few hundred pounds and flexibility to fit the boat out to suit you, making it good for smaller helms or crews. The class association describes the Fireball as "probably the highest performance dinghy that just about anyone can sail in almost any wind strength.""

== See also ==
- List of sailing boat types
