= Prelude (yacht) =

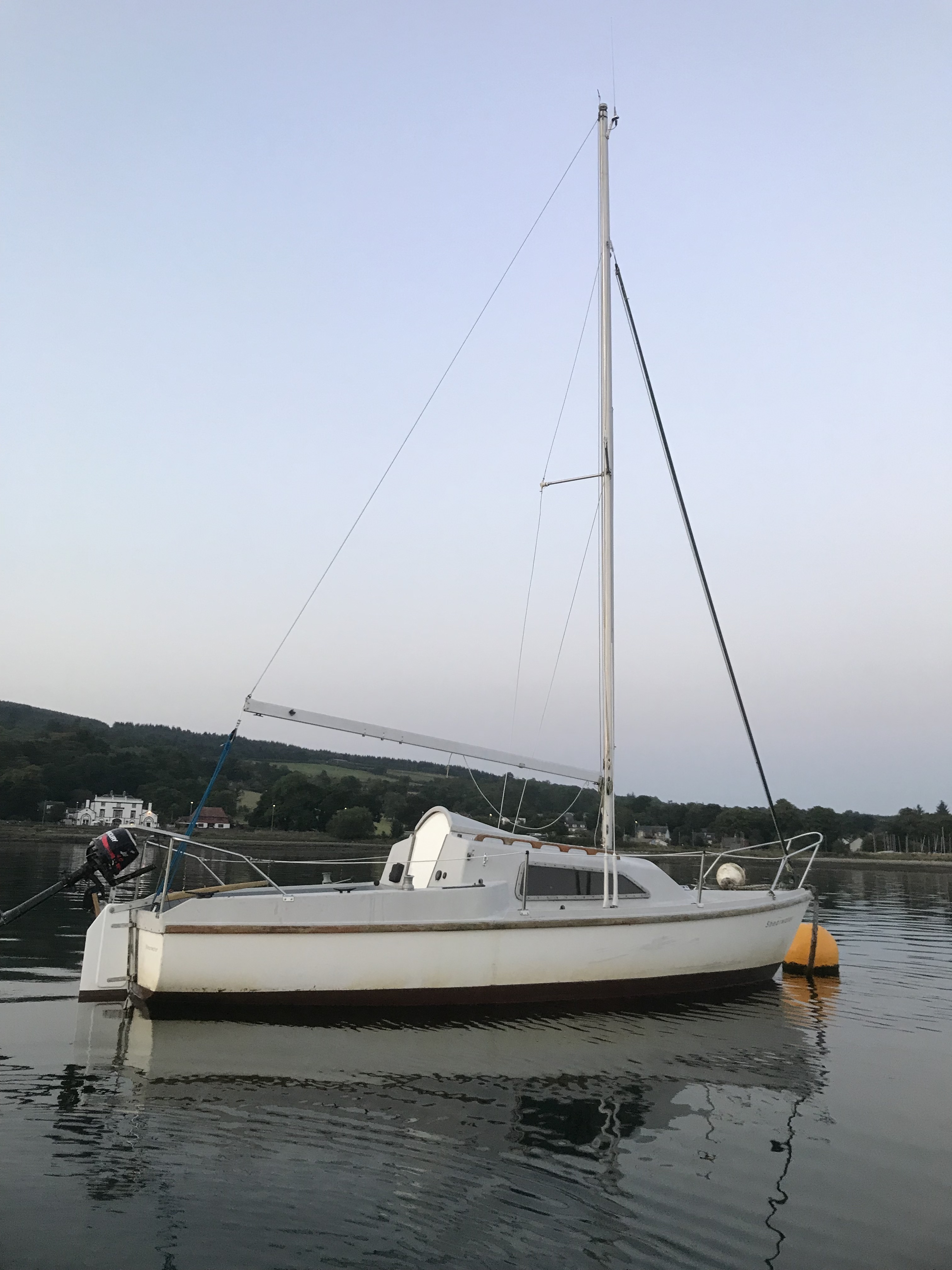

Development
- Designer: Ian Proctor
- Builders: Ridgeway Marine and Pegusus
- Name: Prelude

Boat
- Draft: Fin 3 ft 9 in (1.14 m) Bilge 2 ft 3 in (0.69 m) Drop 2 ft 0 in (0.61 m), 4 ft 66 in (2.90 m)

Hull
- Type: Trailer sailer
- Construction: GRP
- Hull weight: 1,650 lb (750 kg)
- LOA: 19 ft 3 in (5.87 m)
- LWL: 17 ft 0 in (5.18 m)
- Beam: 6 ft 10 in (2.08 m)

Hull appendages
- Keel: Fin, Bilge or Drop Keel

Rig
- Rig type: Mast head or Fractional

Sails
- Mainsail area: Standard 107.5 sq ft (9.99 m^{2}) Masthead 70 sq ft (6.5 m^{2})
- Jib/genoa area: Standard 90 sq ft (8.4 m^{2}) Masthead 121 sq ft (11.2 m^{2})
- Spinnaker area: Standard 160 sq ft (15 m^{2}) Masthead 225 sq ft (20.9 m^{2})

The Prelude is a small sailing yacht, designed by Ian Proctor and built by Ridgeway Marine initially and later by Pegasus.

== Dimensions ==
Dimension	Metric	Imperial
Length Overall (LOA)	5.86 m	19'3"
Load Waterline Length (LWL)	5.18 m	17'0"
Beam	2.09 m	6'10"
Weight	750 kg	1650 lbs

== Keels ==
The prelude is available in three different keel configurations:

=== Fin Keel ===
The fin keel version has a draft of 1.15 m (3 ft 9 in)

=== Bilge Keel ===
Also known as twin keel this version is easily trailerable, can be dried out and has a draft of 0.689 m (2 ft 3.1 in)

=== Drop Keel ===
Also known as a swing or lifting keel, this version has a draft of 1.38 m (4 ft 6 in) when the keel is down or 0.61 m (2 ft 0 in) when the keel is up.

== Rigging ==
The Prelude has a Bermuda rig can cab be supplied as either a Standard (Fractional) or Masthead rig

== Accommodation ==
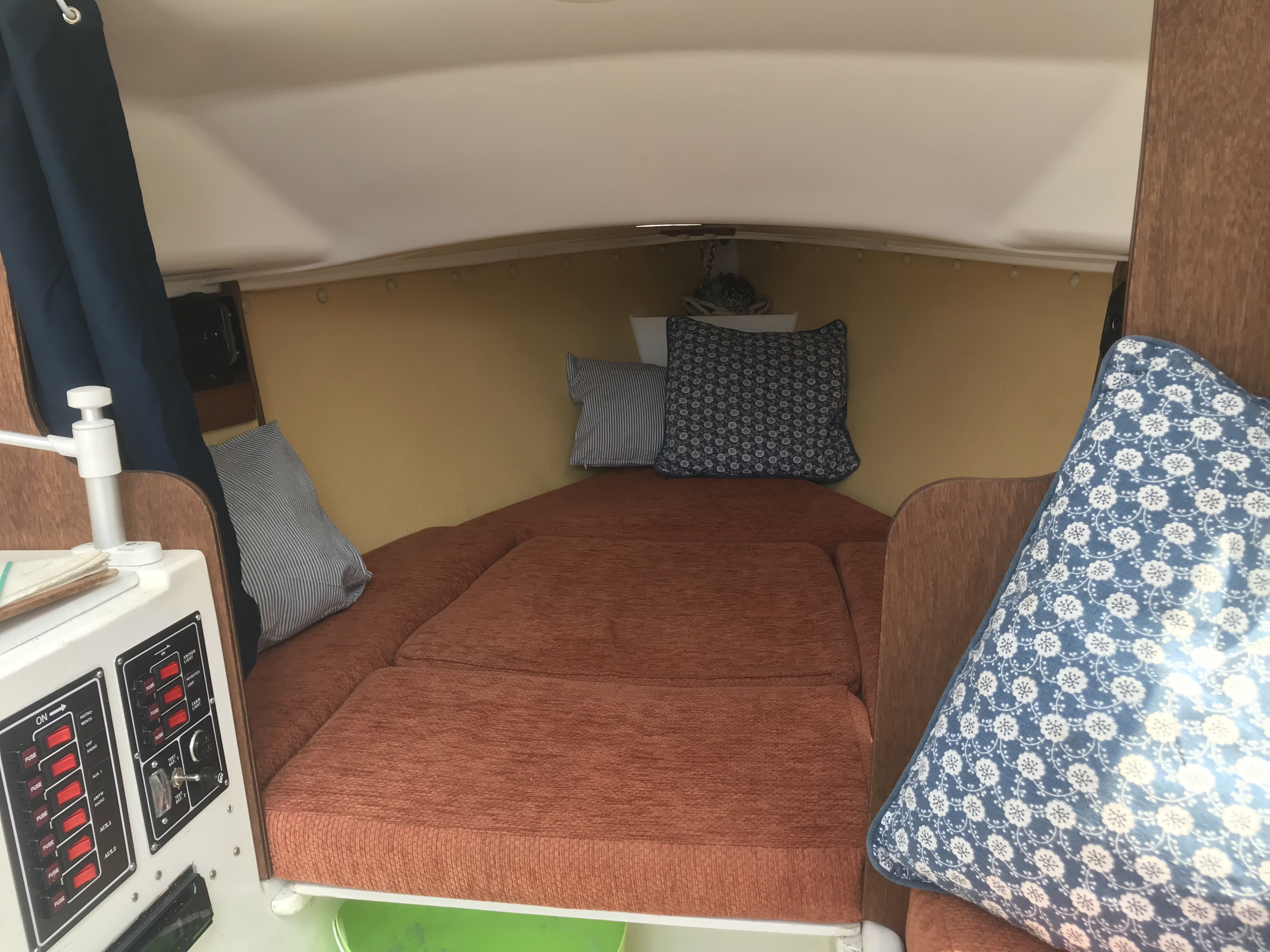
Interior of prelude, fore bunk

The cabin is generous for the size of the boat; comprising 4 full sized berths (minimum 1.86m or 6'1"), space for a chemical toilet and a small galley area with a sink, food store and space for a 2 burner hob.

== The Prelude Owner Association ==
The Prelude Owners Association is an active owners association which provides; Information on the class, a list of members boats' and there sailing areas, a gallery of photos and a forum of members who provide advice relating to the sailing and maintaining of Preludes.
