= Kestrel (dinghy) =

Boat
- Crew: 2

Hull
- Hull weight: 120 kg (260 lb)
- LOA: 4.75 m (15.6 ft)
- Beam: 1.69 m (5 ft 7 in)

Sails
- Spinnaker area: 5.57 m^{2} (60.0 sq ft)
- Upwind sail area: 6.78 m^{2} (73.0 sq ft)

Racing
- D-PN: 91.6
- RYA PN: 1035

The Kestrel was the first sailing dinghy especially designed to have a fibreglass hull.

After a slow start, due to resistance to the new material, the Kestrel grew in popularity. This success led to more and more classes changing their rules to allow fibreglass construction. Today, the class is still a popular choice, particularly for 'club' racers and training schools. The design has been updated by Phil Morrison and has most recently been built by Hartley Boats in Derby.

== History ==
In 1955, Ian Proctor designed the Kestrel.

The first few Kestrels were constructed using timber, since fibreglass technology was still very new. Construction was soon converted to the originally intended fibreglass, but the popularity of the class grew slowly due to a widespread mistrust of the new material.

It was not until, Gmach & Co in Fordingbridge began constructing new hulls that the class started to grow. The firm made the boat for 25 years and introduced a Mark II version.

In 1988, Martin Services in Essex, UK took over construction.

Since 1999, Richard Hartley's company Hartley Laminates have been the sole builders of Kestrels. They have released a new Kestrel called the Kestrel 2000, which is a stronger, stiffer version of the original Kestrel.

== Handicap ==
In handicap racing, the Kestrel sails off a Portsmouth Yardstick number of 1040 or a D-PN of 91.6.
