= Marlin (dinghy) =

Sailing dinghy

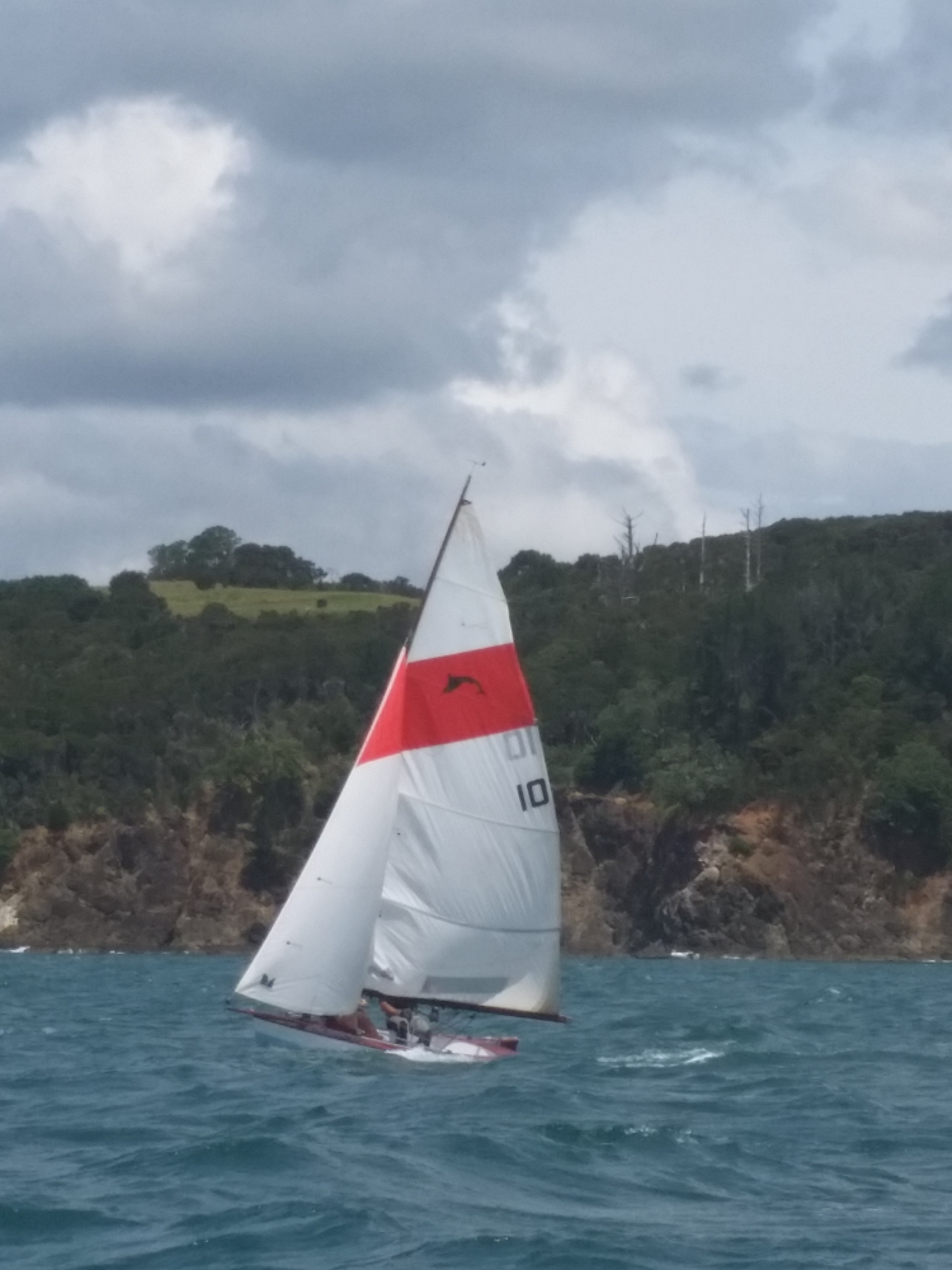

Boat
- Crew: 2–3

Hull
- LOA: 3.99 m (13.1 ft)
- Beam: 1.68 m (5 ft 6 in)

The Marlin is a 14-foot 2/3 person sailing dinghy designed and built by Ian Proctor.

The rigging is very simple and straightforward, easy enough to sail in moderate breezes single handed, and in heavy breezes the mainsail can be reefed to reduce its area.
