= Javelin dinghy (Europe) =

Dinghy sailed in Europe

- Class symbol

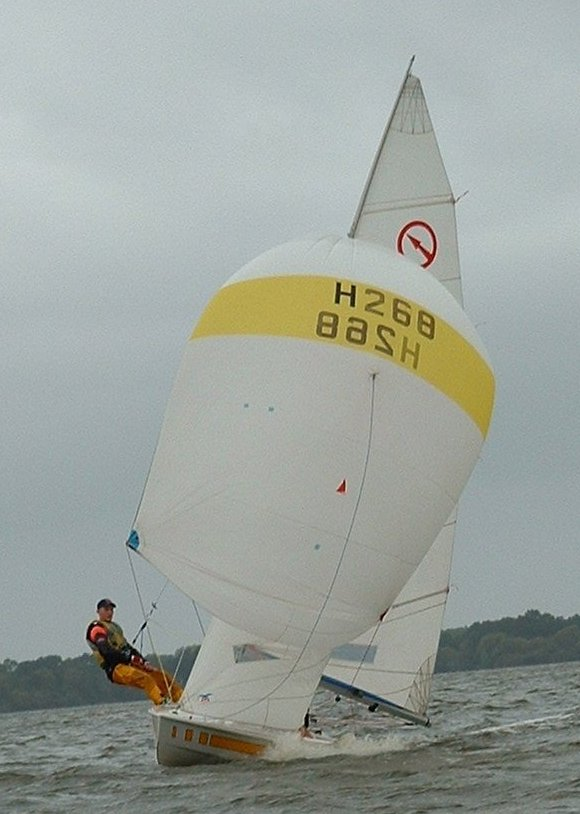

Development
- Designer: Peter Milne
- Year: 1968

Boat
- Crew: 2
- Draft: 1.3 m (4 ft 3 in)
- Trapeze: single

Hull
- Hull weight: 118 kg (260 lb)
- LOA: 5.36 m (17 ft 7 in)
- Beam: 1.68 m (5 ft 6 in)

Sails
- Spinnaker area: 15.79 m^{2} (170.0 ft^{2})
- Upwind sail area: 15.79 m^{2} (170.0 ft^{2})

Racing
- RYA PN: 926

The Javelin class is a 17.7-foot dinghy designed by Peter Milne in 1968. It is designed with plenty of sail area and a single trapeze. The boat is raced in the United Kingdom, Germany and the Netherlands.

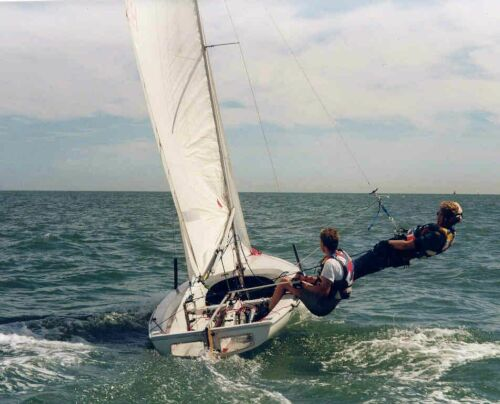

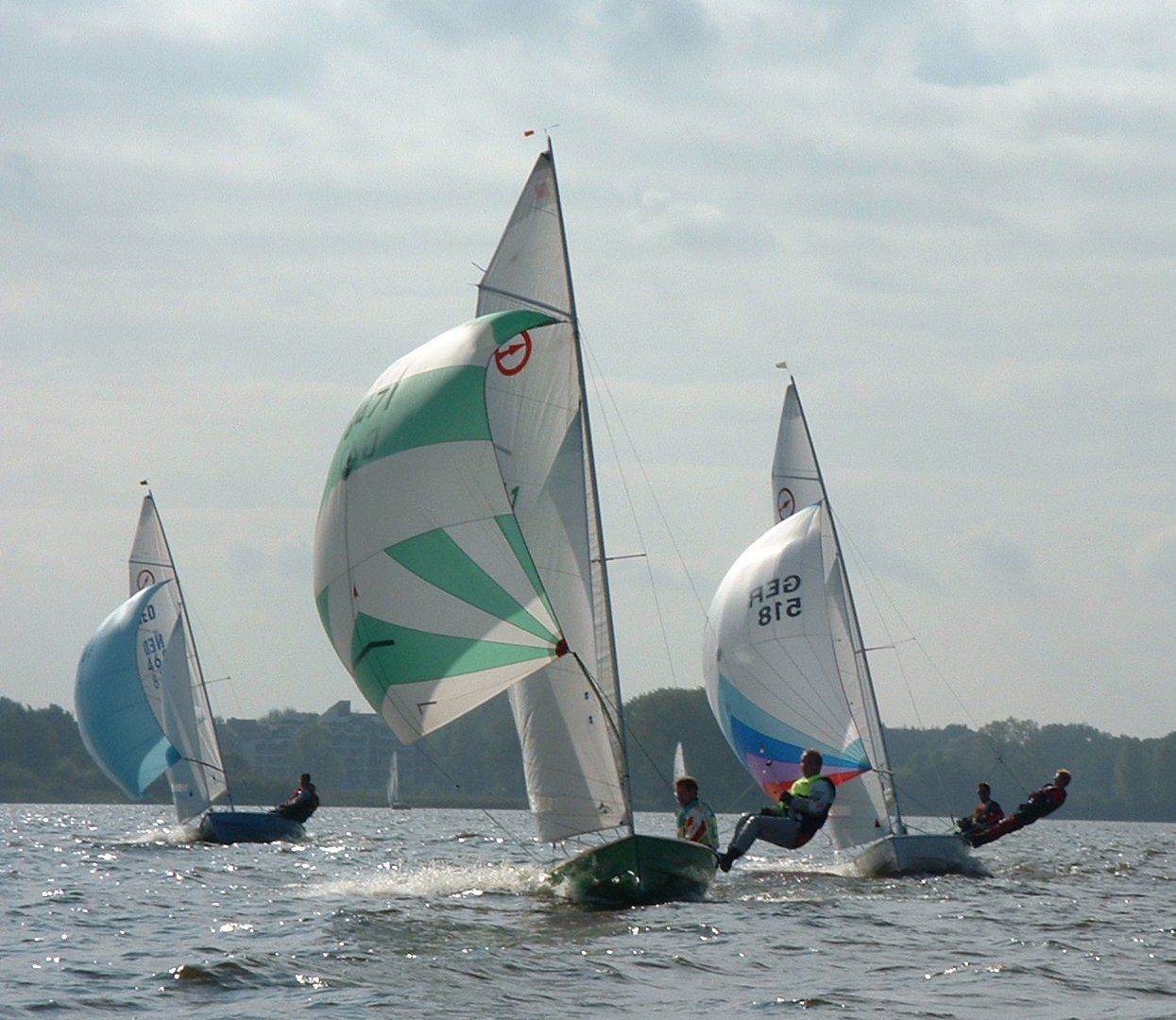

In handicap racing the Javelin sails off a Portsmouth Yardstick of 926.
