= Wanderer (sailing dinghy) =

Type of racing sailboat

Development
- Design: One-Design

Boat
- Crew: 2–3

Hull
- Type: Monohull
- Hull weight: 132 kg (291 lb) (Note: Excepting installation of optional 38.5 kg (85 lb) centre plate. "Wanderer". Caution Water.)
- LOA: 4.3 m (14 ft)
- Beam: 1.8 m (5 ft 11 in)

Sails
- Spinnaker area: 9.9 m^{2} (107 sq ft)
- Upwind sail area: 10.7 m^{2} (115 sq ft)

Racing
- D-PN: 96.0
- RYA PN: 1190

The Wanderer is a 14-foot (4.3 metres = 14.1 feet) Fibreglass hull Bermuda rigged sailing dinghy designed by Ian Proctor. One of the main objectives of the design was to produce a robust safe and versatile dinghy that could be used for knockabout day sailing and cruising as well as racing, but was light enough to be handled ashore.

On the water the boat can be recognised by its Sail logo of a white W in a blue circular background. Over 1600 boats have been produced. It should not be confused with its larger cousin, the Wayfarer (dinghy), which also sports a "W". (Note: The "Wanderer" is named for Frank and Margaret Dye's first Wayfarer. Dye, Margaret (Summer 2013). "My Life With Frank Dye and Wayfarer Wanderer". Dinghy Cruising (Bulletin 219). Dinghy Cruising Association: 2. Archived from the original on 12 November 2013.)

== Design ==
Cruising on the Stour

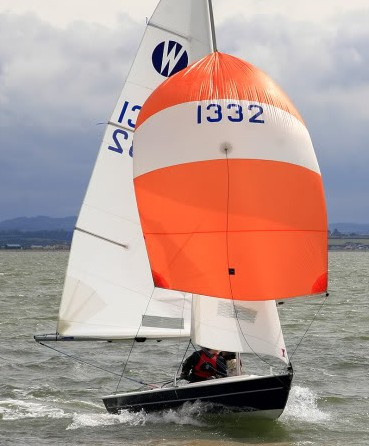
National championships 2009

The initial design brief was given to Ian Proctor by Margaret Dye who wanted a lighter dinghy than the Wayfarer that she had sailed with her husband Frank. Margaret and the late Frank Dye had a wealth of dinghy cruising experience, and their adventures have been captured in Margaret's book Dinghy Cruising – The Enjoyment of Wandering Afloat. ISBN 0-7136-5714-6.

The Wanderer has Main and Jib sails; it can also be fitted with a Spinnaker. Reefing of the main sail is by slab reefing. The jib can be fitted with a roller furling system. The boat is by design an aft main boat rather than a center main boat, although often converted to center main. It has high intrinsic stability, and the normal wooden centreplate can be replaced with an 38.5 kg (85 lb) steel centre board which makes it even harder to capsize. The relatively light weight of the boat contributes to its ease of launching and recovery. The design allows for fitting of a long shafted outboard motor of up to 3.3 hp. There is very ample storage and on Pre-Hartley built hulls an in built waterproof locker, or "Wanderbox", for storage of the outboard motor when not in use.

The Wanderer dinghy design and construction has evolved during the years of manufacture, one of the most significant early changes was the introduction of the MD modification. This was a modification to the distribution of buoyancy resulting in a reduction in the floating height of the boat after a capsize thus aiding recovery (and propitiously making the boat less likely to turn turtle).

In 2006 Hartley Laminates took over the copyright and manufacturing licence for the design. They secured the services of Phil Morrison to redesign the deck plug to modernise the appearance of the boat, allow the hull to self drain through transom flaps and to reduce the complexity of building the hull and thus production costs while retaining the same hull shape and rig.

== Class Association ==
The Wanderer has an active class owners' association (WCOA) which is based in the UK and is responsible for maintaining the class rules . The WCOA organises racing and cruising events all over the United Kingdom including an annual Festival; WandererFest, which has been held at Cobnor near Chidham and Hambrook for the last 10 years.

The association website hosts all the details of the class rules, constitution, boat history, technical details and events.

The association also publishes a magazine three times a year of news of the Owners' Association.
