= Topper (dinghy) =

International racing sailing class

- Class symbol

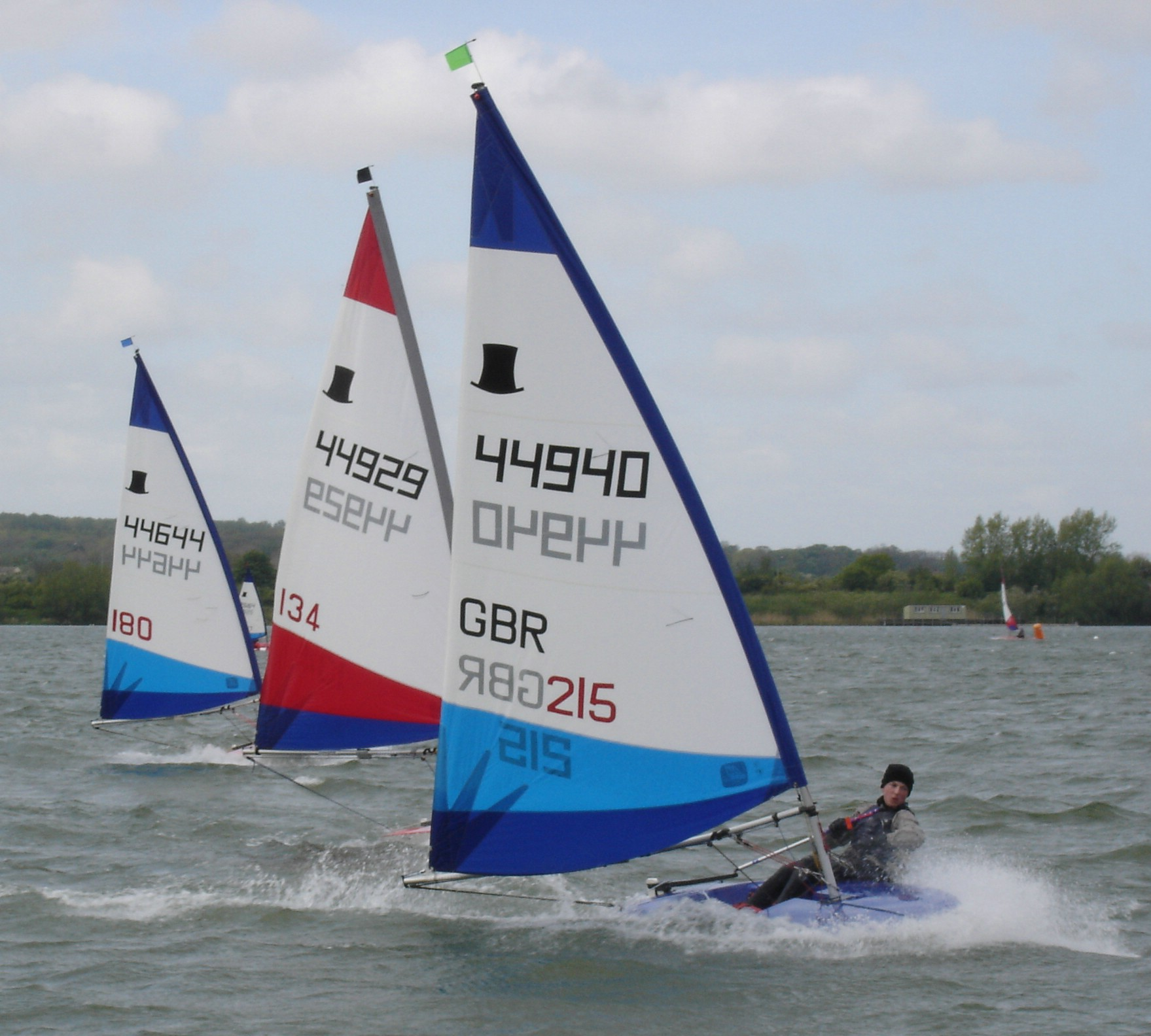
- Toppers at Stewartby Open 2005

Development
- Designer: Ian Proctor
- Year: 1977
- Design: One-Design
- Name: Topper

Boat
- Crew: 1

Hull
- Type: Monohull
- Construction: Polypropylene/Polyethylene
- Hull weight: 94 lb (43 kg)
- LOA: 11 ft 1 in (3.38 m)
- Beam: 3 ft 11 in (1.19 m)

Hull appendages
- Keel: Daggerboard

Rig
- Rig type: Cat rig

Sails
- Mainsail area: 6.4 m^{2} (69 sq ft) 5.3 m^{2} (57 sq ft) 4.2 m^{2} (45 sq ft)

Racing
- D-PN: 110.4
- RYA PN: 1301

The Topper is an 11 foot (approx. 3.3m) 43 kg (95 lb) sailing dinghy designed by Ian Proctor. The Topper was a one-design boat until 2023 when a new version was produced, and is sailed mostly around the British Isles. It was recognised as a World Sailing Class.

The boat was previously constructed from polypropylene, and now is roto moulded, which is popular as a racing boat or for sail training.

The class association (ITCA) organises racing events, which range from small travellers to major championships. The Royal Yachting Association run squads alongside the events; in these squads young sailors who are given specialist race coaching. It is sailed widely among junior sailors in the UK and Ireland and there is a growing fleet in China.

== Class history and design ==
The Topper was designed by Ian Proctor in 1977 as a One-Design racing boat. The Topper was initially manufactured and developed by John Dunhill of J V Dunhill Boats Ltd and has been in continuous production for over four decades and over 49,000 examples have now been sold. The Topper dinghy is built in the UK by Topper International Ltd. owned by Martin Fry who purchased the company from Guinness Leisure in 1983. In 1977 the boat won the Design Council Award and the Horner Award for achievements in plastics. The Topper featured in the BBC show Tomorrow's World with its innovative construction in polypropylene.

The Topper dinghy is widely used for racing, but it has also gained popularity as a boat in which to learn how to sail. The Topper was originally designed with a glass reinforced plastic (GRP) hull making it a relatively light but durable boat, however, it was later decided that the Topper should be constructed with injection moulding, using polypropylene, which is less expensive but heavier and less rigid.

In 2021, the injection mould was damaged beyond repair and would have required replacement. As this was not financially viable, the boat was redesigned to be rotomoulded in polyethylene meaning the iconic red colour on the deck had to be replaced with hull colour. The new version was introduced in 2023.

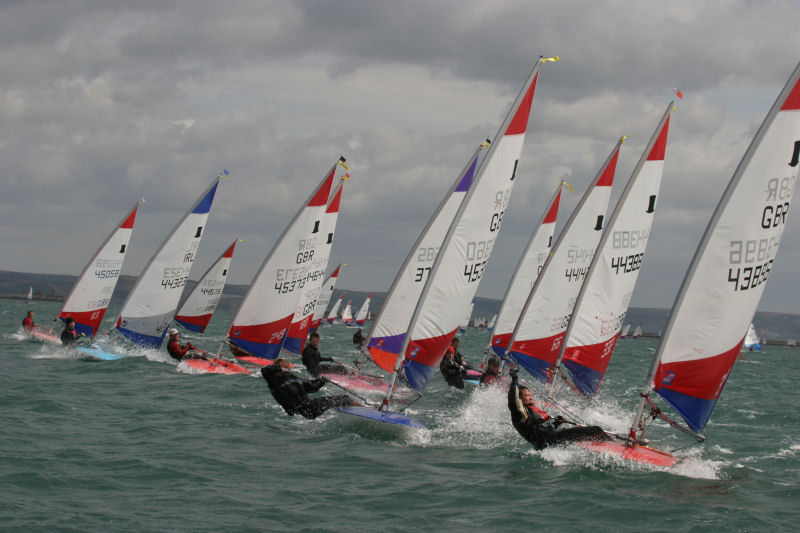
Toppers at the 2006 National Championships, WPNSA

Although the Topper was originally rigged with an aft mainsheet, since 2004 the option to use a centre main has been allowed. The motivation for such a change being that most other dinghies, including the ones Topper sailors are likely to advance to, are rigged with centre mainsheets.

In 2005 a smaller 4.2 m^{2} sail was approved, which can optionally be used in favour of the standard 5.3 m^{2} sail. The smaller sail is more efficient than a larger sail that is reefed. The first 4.2m² national championships were held in 2010.

In 2020, after two years of development, a new 6.4m² rig for the Topper was introduced.

At 11' the Topper is named for the ability to transport it on the roof of a car, and the mast splits into two sections, allowing the spars to be stored and transported.

Despite the age of the design, the Topper Class remains one of the fastest growing classes in the UK, with a very active national association. The Topper class is a recognised World Sailing International Class since 2005. The GBR Nationals and the World Championships often have over 200 boats in the 5.3 class and 70 in the 4.2.

The largest fleet is in Great Britain where the class is part of the RYA "pathway" class program with turnouts at the RYA regional Championships and the highest percentage of RYA Transitional Youth Squad members. Most 'GB Young Sailor of the Year' nominations in recent years have come from within the Topper Class.

== See also ==
- Dinghy sailing
- Dinghy racing
- Farr 3.7
