= Frank Dye =

- Born: Frank Charles Dye; 23 April 1928; Watton, Norfolk, England
- Died: 16 May 2010 (aged 82)
- Occupations: Sailor and author
- Known for: Sailing to Iceland and Norway in an uncovered dinghy

Frank Charles Dye (23 April 1928 – 16 May 2010) was an English sailor who, in two separate voyages, sailed a Wayfarer class dinghy from the United Kingdom to Iceland and Norway. An account of this was written by Dye and his wife, Margaret, published as Ocean Crossing Wayfarer: To Iceland and Norway in a 16ft Open Dinghy.

== Biography ==
Dye was born in Watton, Norfolk, on 23 April 1928 and was educated at Hamond's Grammar School, Swaffham. After school he joined his father's Ford car dealership and began sailing in his early thirties. In 1958 he bought the first of several Wayfarer dinghies.

He met his wife, Margaret, at the 1963 Earl's Court Boat Show and married her in 1964. For their honeymoon they sailed to the Hebridean island of St Kilda.

== Scotland to Iceland, 1963 ==
In 1963, Dye, along with Russell Brockbank, sailed their Wayfarer dinghy Wanderer from Kinlochbervie in Scotland to Iceland (landing on the island of Heimaey). The 650-mile journey took them 11 days. Aboard they carried only a compass and sextant for navigation. During the journey they encountered force 8 gales, freezing temperatures, seasickness and broken rigging.

== Scotland to Faroe Islands and Norway, 1964 ==
In July 1964, Dye, along with crew member, Bill Brockbank (no relation to Russell), sailed the 650 nautical miles between Scotland and the Faroe Islands and across the Norwegian Sea to Norway. During the voyage they ran into a force 9 gale and were capsized four times. Their mast had been shattered but they managed to jury-rig another.

== Wayfarer dinghy ==
Frank and Margaret's Wayfarer dinghy, Wanderer, is in the collection of the National Maritime Museum Cornwall at Falmouth, Cornwall.

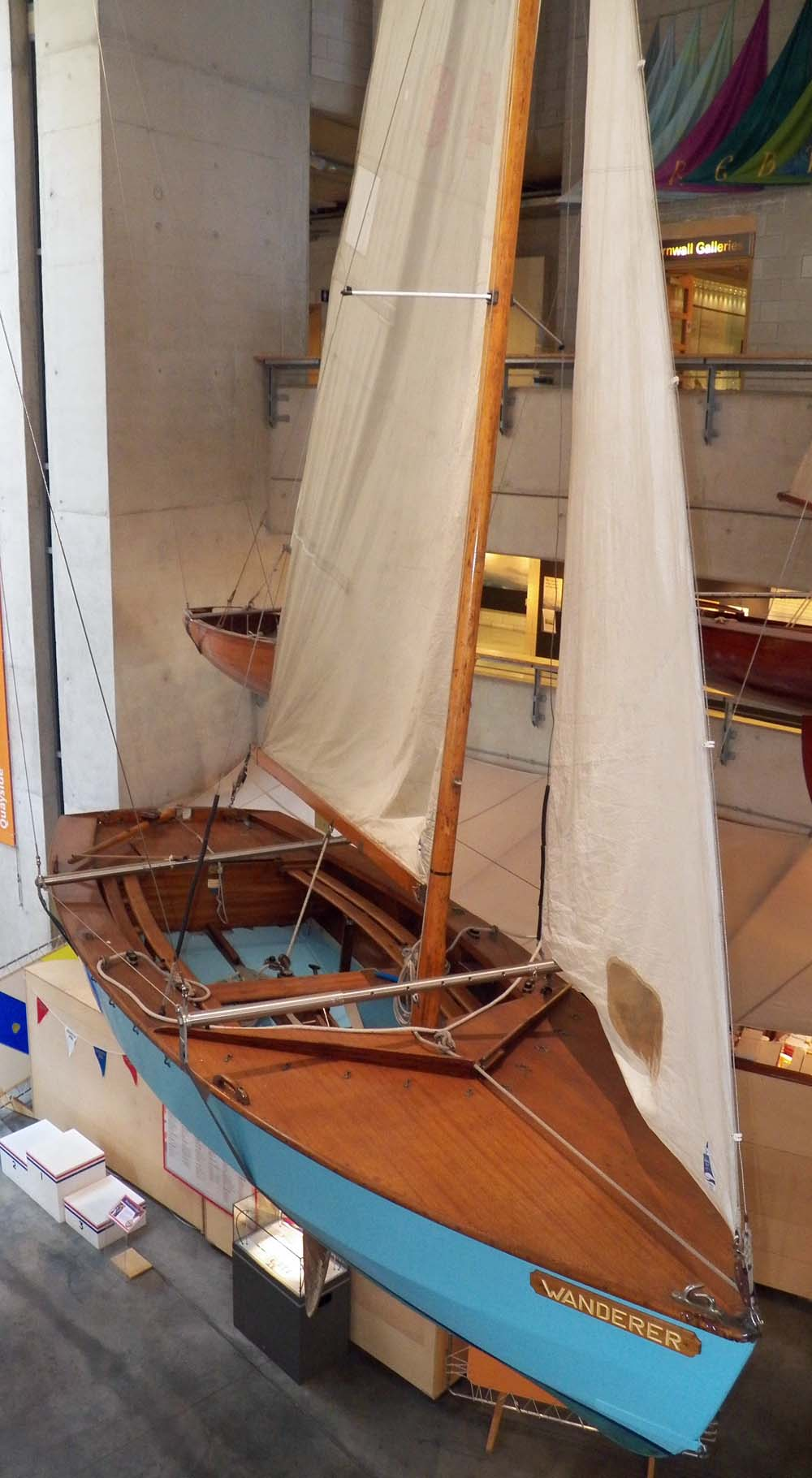
Wanderer - sail No W48, the open sailing dinghy of the Wayfarer class that Frank Dye sailed to Iceland and Norway. Now in UK National Maritime museum, Falmouth, Cornwall.

== Published works ==
- Dye, Frank; Dye, Margaret (1977). Ocean-crossing wayfarer: to Iceland and Norway in an open boat [in a 16ft Open Dinghy] (Print). Newton Abbott North Pomfret, Vt: David & Charles. ISBN 0-7153-7371-4.
- Dye, Frank (February 2001). Sailing to the Edge of Fear (Paperback) (First Thus ed.). Halifax, Nova Scotia: Nimbus Pub Ltd. p. 240. ISBN 1551092832. ISBN 978-1551092836
