= Vago =

Vago may refer to:

== People ==
- Antal Vágó (1891–1944), Hungarian footballer
- István Vágó (1949–2023), Hungarian television presenter
- Pierre Vago (1910–2002), French architect

== Other ==
- Vago, West Virginia, a community in the United States
- Laser Vago, a sailing dinghy
- El Rincón del Vago, a Spanish-language web portal
