= Laser 2 =

Sailboat class

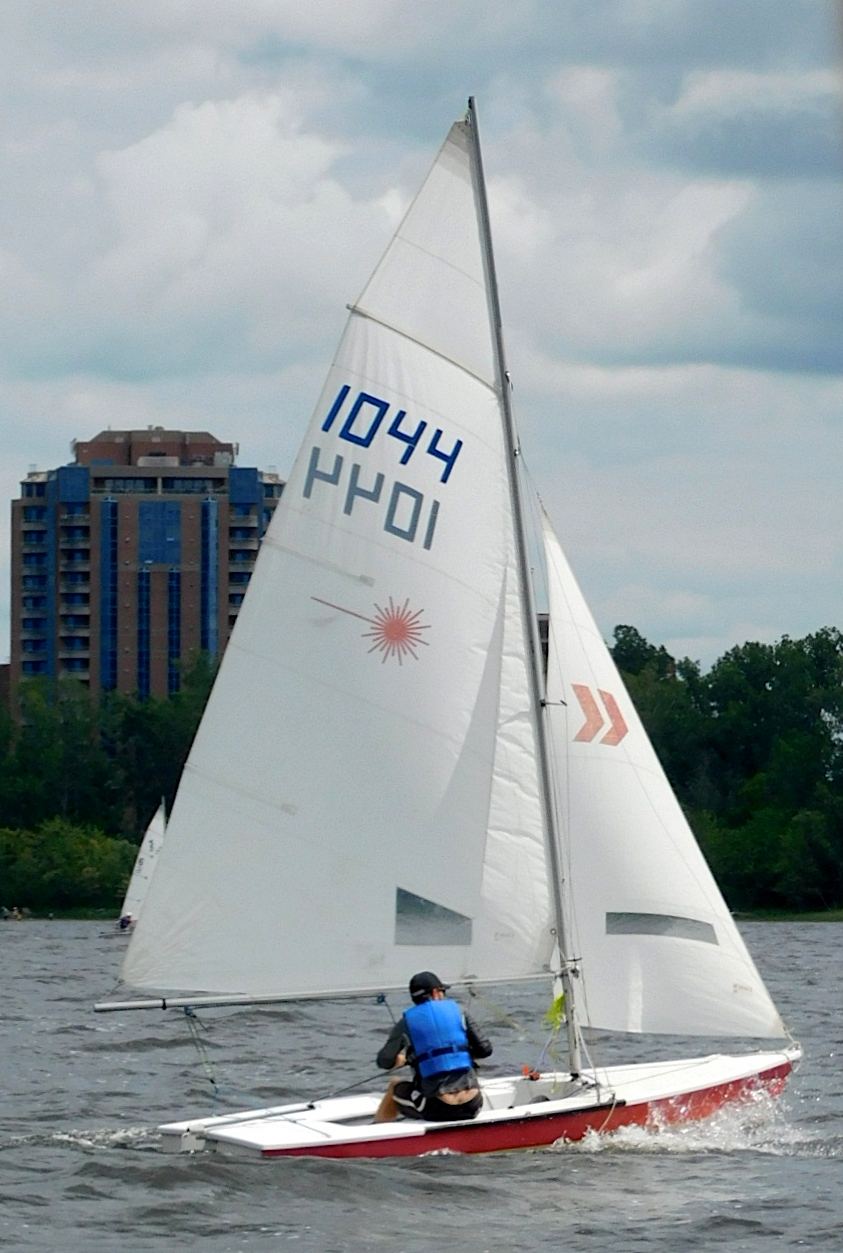

Development
- Designer: Frank Bethwaite; Ian Bruce
- Location: Canada
- Year: 1978
- No. built: 8,200
- Builders: Performance Sailcraft; Vanguard Sailboats
- Role: Racer
- Name: Laser 2

Boat
- Crew: two
- Displacement: 170 lb (77 kg)
- Draft: 3.50 ft (1.07 m) with daggerboard down

Hull
- Type: monohull
- Construction: fibreglass
- LOA: 14.42 ft (4.40 m)
- LWL: 13.83 ft (4.22 m)
- Beam: 4.67 ft (1.42 m)

Hull appendages
- Keel: daggerboard
- Rudder: transom-mounted rudder

Rig
- Rig type: Bermuda rig

Sails
- Sailplan: fractional rigged sloop
- Total sail area: 124.00 sq ft (11.520 m^{2})

Racing
- D-PN: 92.8
- RYA PN: 1035

The Laser 2, or Laser II, is a sailboat that was designed by New Zealander Frank Bethwaite and Canadian Ian Bruce as a one-design racer and first built in 1978.

== Production ==
The design was built by Bruce's company, Performance Sailcraft, in Canada and also by Vanguard Sailboats in the United States. Production began in 1978 with approximately 8,200 boats completed, but it is now out of production. In 2007 Performance Sailcraft and Vanguard were merged to form LaserPerformance.

== Design ==
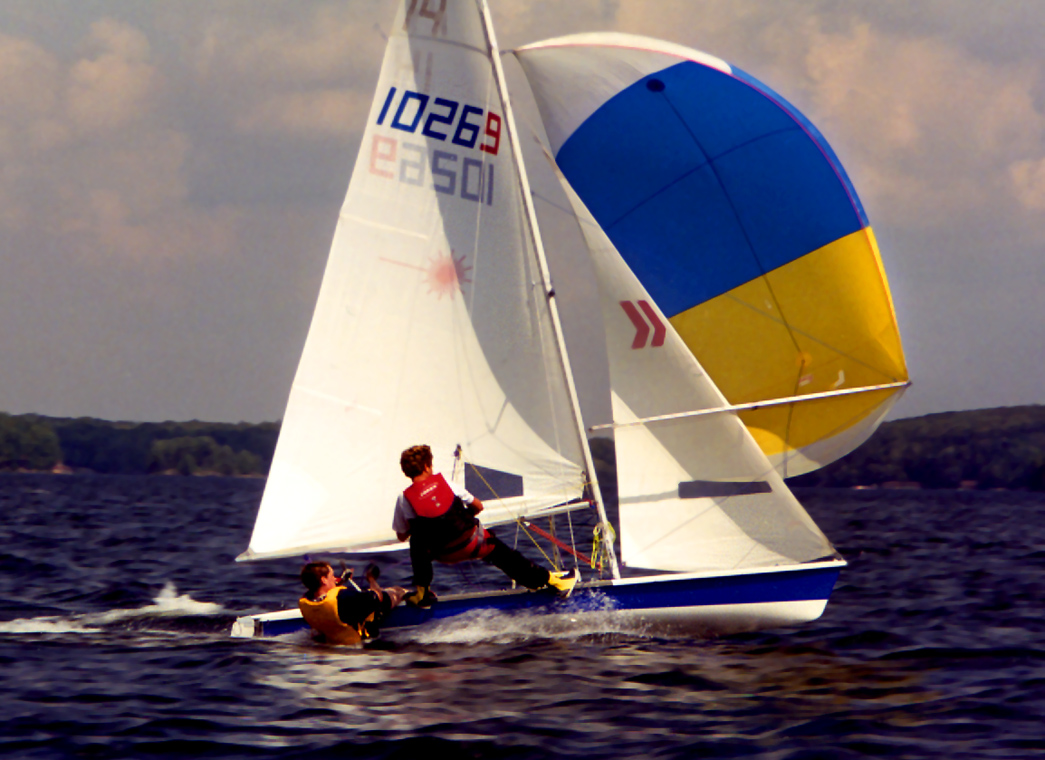
A Laser 2 flying its spinnaker, with the crew on the trapeze

The Laser 2 is a sailing dinghy, built predominantly of fibreglass. It has a fractional sloop rig, a raked stem, a plumb transom, a transom-hung rudder controlled by a tiller with an extension and a retractable daggerboard. It displaces 170 lb (77 kg). The crew can make use of a single trapeze.

The boat has a draft of 3.50 ft (1.07 m) with the daggerboard extended and 4 in (10 cm) with it retracted, allowing operation in shallow water, beaching or ground transportation on a trailer.

For sailing downwind the design may be equipped with a symmetrical spinnaker.

The design has a US Portsmouth Yardstick D-PN handicap of 92.8 and a UK RYA-PN of 1035.

== Variants ==
The basic Laser 2 was produced in a number of variants, including the Laser II Fun, Laser II Regatta and the Laser Fun New Wave, which was equipped with an asymmetrical spinnaker. All were out of production by 1990.

== Operational history ==
The boat was at one time a World Sailing international class, but its status has been revoked.

In a February 1980 review John Turnbull in Canadian Yachting wrote of the Laser 2, "Frank Bethwaite, the unclaimed maestro of high-powered dinghy design, and Ian Bruce, the designer / promoter of Performance Sailcraft, may have come up with the only boat that could live up to the expectations created by the Laser. It doesn't bring anything startlingly new to sailboat design except perhaps the idea that a mass-market boat should be fast and challenging."

== See also ==
- List of sailing boat types

Related development

- Laser (dinghy)
