= Sea Island One-Design =

The Sea Island One-Design, or SIOD is a wood-constructed sailing skiff that features a wide and flat profile. The boat was first designed to sail in the Rockville Regatta and eventually spurred other local yacht clubs to build their own and to establish an invitational regatta of their own. It has a mostly flat deck that only differs in the middle where it tapers downwards towards the centerboard. The SIOD is known not for its speed but for its simple boxy design and its flat-bottom hull that characterizes it as strictly a day sailer built for the races. It is usually sailed by three people who fill one of which jobs: skipper (steers), main sail, and jib position. This boat is native to the waterways in and around Charleston, South Carolina where it has been the main event in local regattas since its design after World War II. The boat was designed in order to create a racing fleet that was composed of multiple boats that were all built to a secret set of specific standards.

== History ==
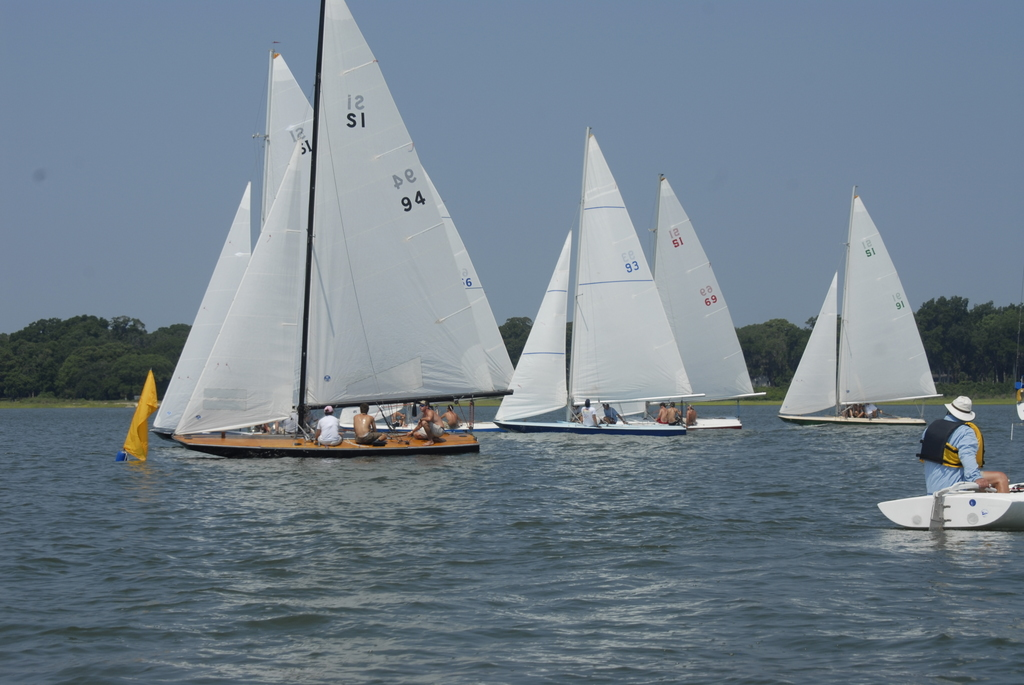
SIODs on the starting line: Grey Ghost (94), Bohicket II (93), Doghouse (69) and Island Spirit (91)

The Sea Island One-Design was designed in 1947 in a joint effort between Oliver Seabrook and a naval architect named Henry Scheel, who was from Mystic, Connecticut. Oliver Seabrook was the man who thought up and drafted the first sketches of the One-design that were later sent to Scheel for finishing touches and a final draft. The first boats—Cygnet, Undine, Doghouse, and Marcheta—were all built by each of the area yacht clubs to participate in a race series for bragging rights. The race series that was formed by each club's regatta was headlined by the last regatta of the season that was held in Rockville, South Carolina.

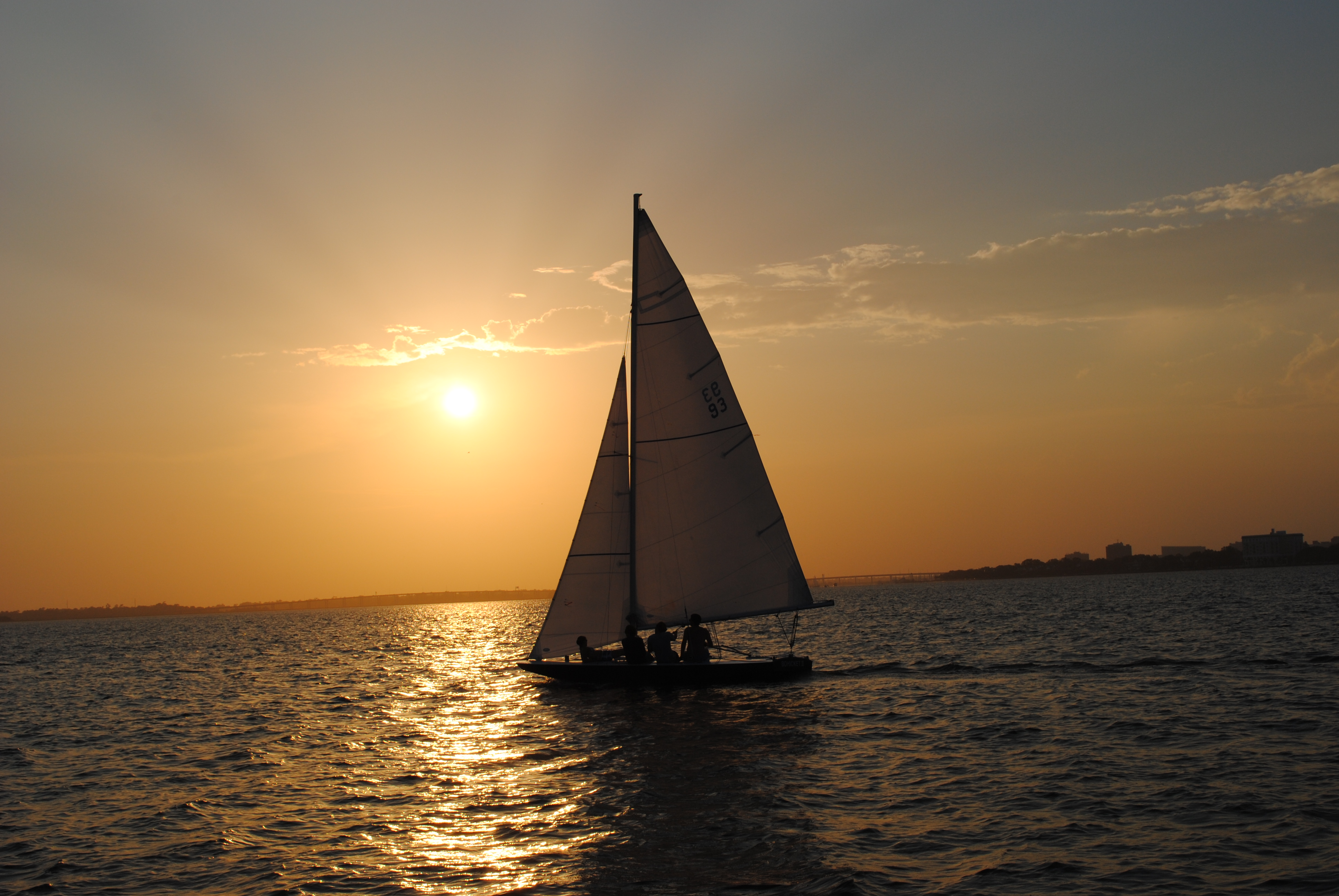
The Bohicket II sails in Charleston harbor.

== Rockville Regatta ==
The regatta is hosted by the Sea Island Yacht Club and takes place in Bohicket Creek every year. The event hosts multiple different sailing classes including E-Scow, Laser, Sunfish, Y-Flyer, and Optimist. However the main event is the Sea Island One Design class.

The first regatta was held in August 1899. Every year since the regatta has gained popularity and eventually a large following. In its heyday the regatta would attract over 300 entrants, but with a declining interest in sailing it usually has closer to fifty or so boats. Although the number of sailboats has decreased slowly over time, the number of power boats and people in the "spectator fleet" has greatly increased. The floating conglomeration of boats, barges, rafts, and everything in between has grown to become a large floating party. It is often joked about that only a quarter of the people in the spectator fleet even know that there is a sailboat race going on.

== Second Generation ==
The SIOD fleet was given new life in the 1980s with the birth of three new boats that were built by local Mark Bayne for D. Van Smith. Van Smith, a Rockville resident, now owns the Privateer and Bohicket II. The fleet grew to eight with the addition of the Grey Ghost which was also built by Mark Bayne for the late Mike Groshon. Local, Grayson Carter, bought Island Spirit and Doghouse from Van Smith. He now owns those two along with Grey Ghost. The newest of the Sea Islands, Flounder, made nine SIOD's when skipper Michael Miller sailed its debut Regatta, the 2011 Rockville Regatta.
