= Sailfish (disambiguation) =

Sailfish is the common name for fish of the genus Istiophorus.

Sailfish may also refer to:

== Technology ==
- Sailfish OS, a mobile operating system
  - Sailfish Alliance, an open alliance for Sailfish OS
- Pixel (1st generation) (codename Sailfish), a smartphone by Google

== Ships and boats ==
- Sailfish (sailboat), a board-boat style of sailing dinghy
- Sailfish-class submarine, a US class of submarine built for radar picket
- USS Sailfish (SS-192), a US submarine in commission in 1939 and again from 1940 to 1945
- USS Sailfish (SSR-572), a US submarine in commission from 1956 to 1978
