= American 14.6 =

Sailboat class

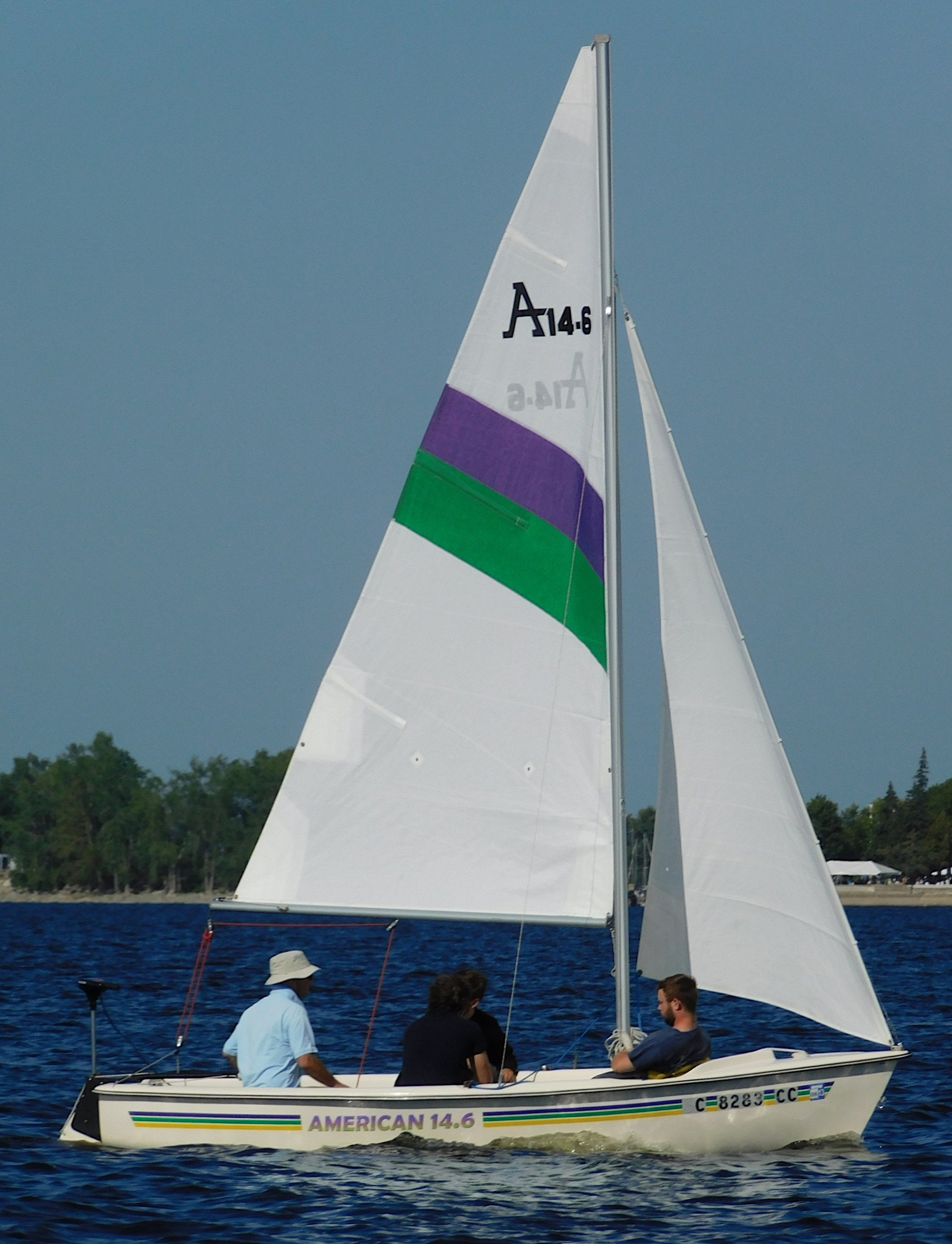

Development
- Location: United States
- Year: 1988
- No. built: 1200
- Builder: American Sail
- Name: American 14.6

Boat
- Displacement: 340 lb (154 kg)
- Draft: 3.50 ft (1.07 m)

Hull
- Type: Monohull
- Construction: Fiberglass
- LOA: 14.50 ft (4.42 m)
- LWL: 13.00 ft (3.96 m)
- Beam: 6.17 ft (1.88 m)
- Engine: Outboard motor

Hull appendages
- Keel: Centerboard
- Ballast: none
- Rudder: transom-mounted rudder

Rig
- Rig type: Bermuda rig

Sails
- Sailplan: Fractional rigged sloop
- Total sail area: 112 sq ft (10.4 m^{2})

The American 14.6 is an American sailing dinghy that was first built in 1988.

== Production ==
The design has built by American Sail in the United States since 1988 and remains in production. 1200 examples have been completed.

== Design ==
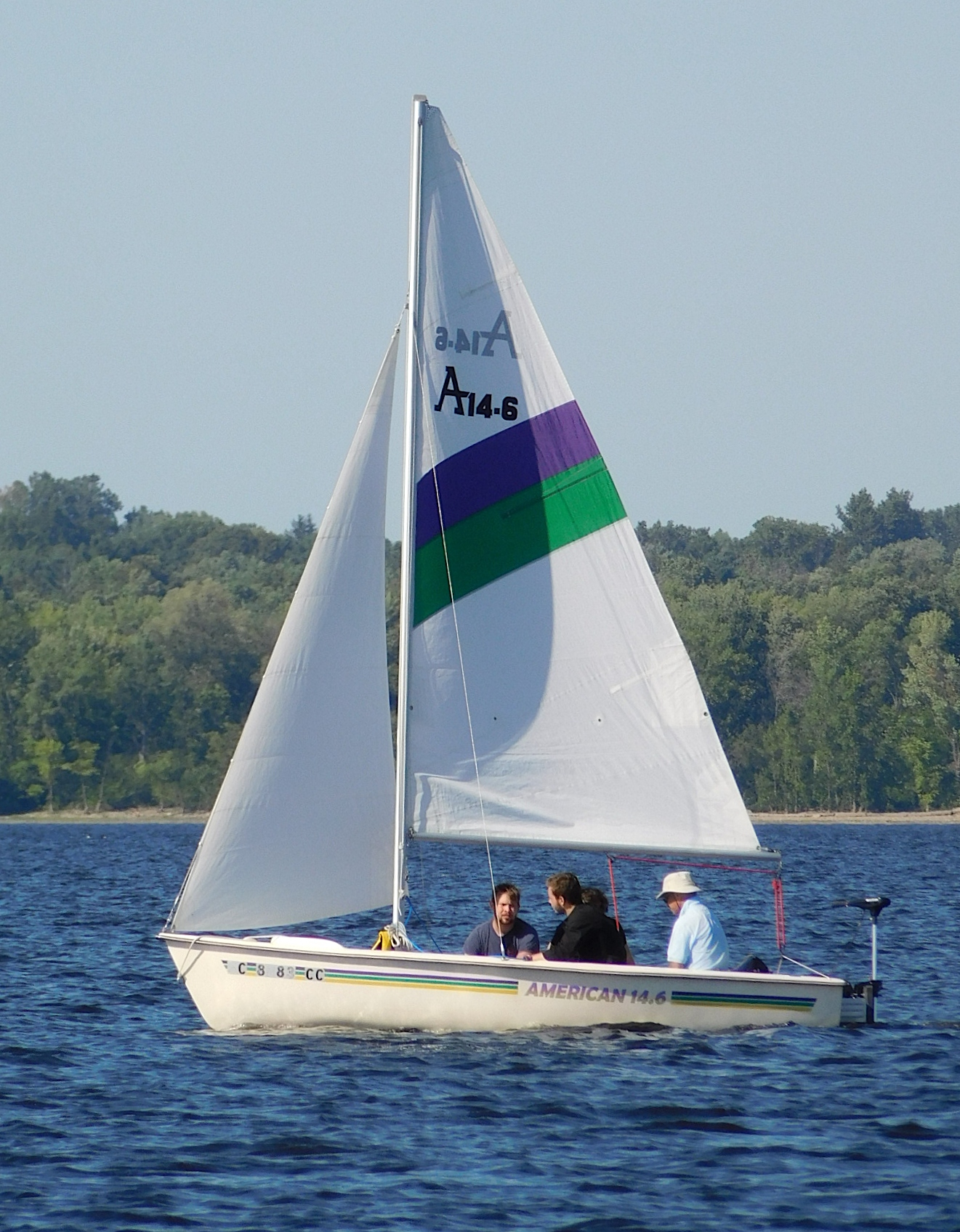
American 14.6, equipped with a Minn Kota electric trolling motor

The American 14.6 is a recreational sailboat, built predominantly of fiberglass, with closed-cell flotation and anodized aluminum spars. It has raked stem, a vertical transom, a transom-hung, kick-up, spring-loaded rudder controlled by a tiller and a centerboard. It displaces 340 lb (154 kg) and can accommodate four people. Features include a storage area for lunches and drinks.

The boat has a draft of 3.50 ft (1.07 m) with the centerboard extended and 0.33 ft (0.10 m) with it retracted, allowing beaching or ground transportation on a trailer. The boat is delivered with a 700 lb (320 kg) capacity trailer.

The boat is equipped with a motor bracket and can fitted with a small outboard motor for docking and maneuvering.

== Operational history ==
A review in boats.com described the design as, "as an extremely stable, large, dry, daysailer providing fun for all ages".

The Society for the Education of American Sailors noted the design "is designed for the beginning sailor or those who are seeking a large, stable sloop that offers hassle-free sailing."

== See also ==
- List of sailing boat types

Similar sailboats

- Laser 2
