= Vanguard Sailboats =

Sailboat builder

- Type: Private
- Industry: Sailing
- Founded: Waukesha, Wisconsin, USA (1967)
- Founders: Peter Harken, Olaf Harken
- Headquarters: Portsmouth, Rhode Island, US
- Website: www.laserperformance.com

Vanguard Sailboats was one of the most successful sailboat builders. It was founded in 1967 and is now owned by LaserPerformance.

== History ==
Vanguard Sailboats was founded in 1967 in Waukesha, Wisconsin, USA, by Peter and Olaf Harken. The brothers started to gain attention after their sailing hardware was used on boats that won Olympic gold in 1968, and after Vanguard supplied the Finn class for several countries in the 1976 Olympics. The hardware segment was maintained somewhat separately, as it was marketed to competing boat builders. In 1986, the Harkens sold Vanguard to Stephen Clark, who moved the business to Portsmouth, Rhode Island. The brothers focused their efforts on the performance sailing hardware business in Pewaukee, WI under the name Harken, Inc., while Vanguard continued in boat building.

In March 1997, Vanguard Sailboats, Inc., bought Sunfish Laser, Inc., which built the Laser, Sunfish, and 49er sailboats.

In 2007 Vanguard Sailboats was acquired by Performance Sailcraft Europe. The combined company is known as LaserPerformance.

== Sailing Community ==
LaserPerformance is very active in the sailing community and was a major sponsor of the Intercollegiate Sailing Association until 2022. The ICSA is the organization that governs college sailing in North America. Most colleges and universities sail fleets of 420s, Flying Juniors,s or Vanguard 15s. Additionally, LaserPerformance is a sponsor of many adult and junior sailing regattas.

== See also ==
- LaserPerformance
- List of sailboat designers and manufacturers
