= Sunfish (sailboat) =

Personal-size type of dinghy

- Class symbol

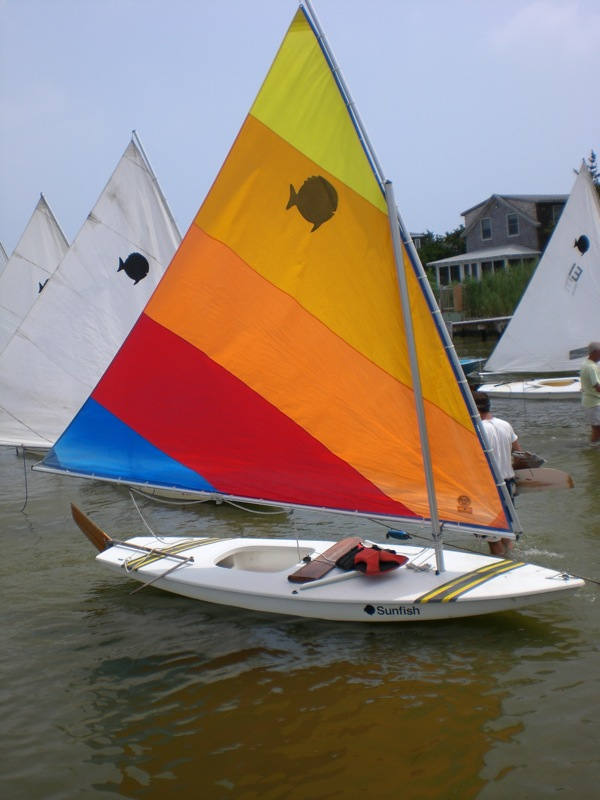

Development
- Designer: Alcort, Inc.
- Year: 1953
- Design: One-Design

Boat
- Crew: 1–2
- Draft: 2 feet 11 inches (0.89 m)

Hull
- Type: Monohull
- Construction: Fiberglass
- Hull weight: 120 pounds (54 kg)
- LOA: 13 feet 9 inches (4.19 m)
- Beam: 4 feet 1 inch (1.24 m)

Hull appendages
- Keel: Daggerboard

Rig
- Rig type: Oceanic lateen (crab claw sail)

Sails
- Mainsail area: 75 square feet (7.0 m^{2})
- Total sail area: 75 square feet (7.0 m^{2})

Rating
- D-PN: 99.6

The Sunfish is a personal-size, beach-launched sailing dinghy. It features a very flat, board-like hull carrying an Oceanic lateen sail mounted to an un-stayed mast.

Sunfish was developed by Alcort, Inc. and first appeared around 1952 as the "next generation" improvement on their original boat, the Sailfish. In contrast, the Sunfish has a wider beam for more stability, increased freeboard and the addition of a foot-well for a more comfortable sailing position. Sunfish began as a wood hull design and progressed to fiberglass construction just a few years after its introduction.

The Sunfish has a lateen sail and a two line rigging. Upgrades can be added to enhance sail control for competitive sailing, making the boat attractive to both novice and experienced sailors alike.

Due to the broad appeal of the Sunfish, in 1995 it was commended by the American Sailboat Hall of Fame for being "the most popular fiberglass boat ever designed, with a quarter million sold worldwide" (at that point in time).

Early in 2016, manufacturer Laser Performance moved production from Portsmouth, Rhode Island, US to China and boats were supplied to the 2016 World Championships.

In 2017, Laser Performance (LP) announced the creation of a new governing body to manage the Sunfish Class, the International Sunfish Class Organization (ISCO), after the International Sunfish Class Association (ISCA), governing body since 1969, refused to sign a trademark agreement. In response the ISCA, still the World Sailing recognised Class Association, have announced rule changes which permit alternative suppliers to Laser Performance for some components.

In 2024, ISCA approved Zim Sailing as the new exclusive builder of class-approved boats.

Today, the Sunfish brand-name has become so widely known it is often misapplied generically to refer to any brand of board-style boat sporting the characteristic lateen sail.

In February 2025, SERO Innovation officially became the exclusive global manufacturer of the Sunfish sailboat, although these boats do not meet the specifications of the International Sunfish Class Association and are not class legal. Zim Sailing is the only manufacturer of class legal boats.

== Design ==
The distinctive low-aspect ratio lateen sail gives the Sunfish an anachronistic appearance compared with today's more familiar high-aspect ratio Bermuda rig sailboats. However, this sail plan is not as old-world as it might first appear. Using a lateen rig for this style boat shifts the advantage toward better performance in lighter air (less than 4 on the Beaufort scale) and contributes to it having good down-wind characteristics.

The hull's very mild "V" bottom and hard chine make Sunfish a most stable boat for its size, along with enabling it to sail on a plane (hydroplane). Planing allows the boat achieve a speed greater than theoretical hull speed based on length at waterline (LWL). Having a down-wind performance advantage helps the Sunfish achieve a planing attitude at lower wind speeds than its high-aspect ratio sail plan counterparts.

Designed as a water-tight, hollow-body pontoon, a hull like the Sunfish is sometimes referred to as "self-rescuing" because the boat can be capsized and its cockpit swamped without threat of the boat sinking.

== History ==
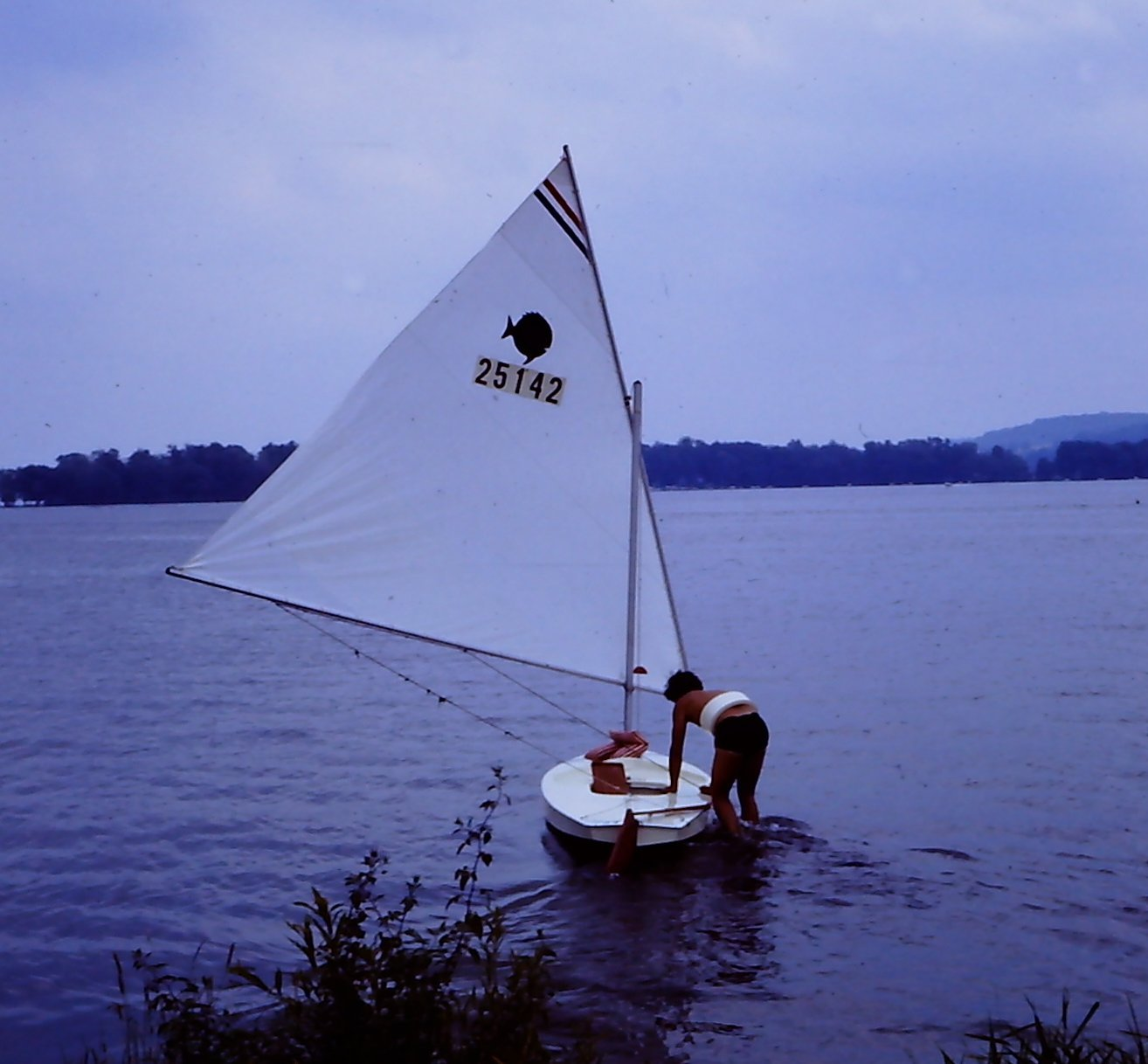
Sunfish Sailboat (Niagara River, Buffalo, New York; 1970)

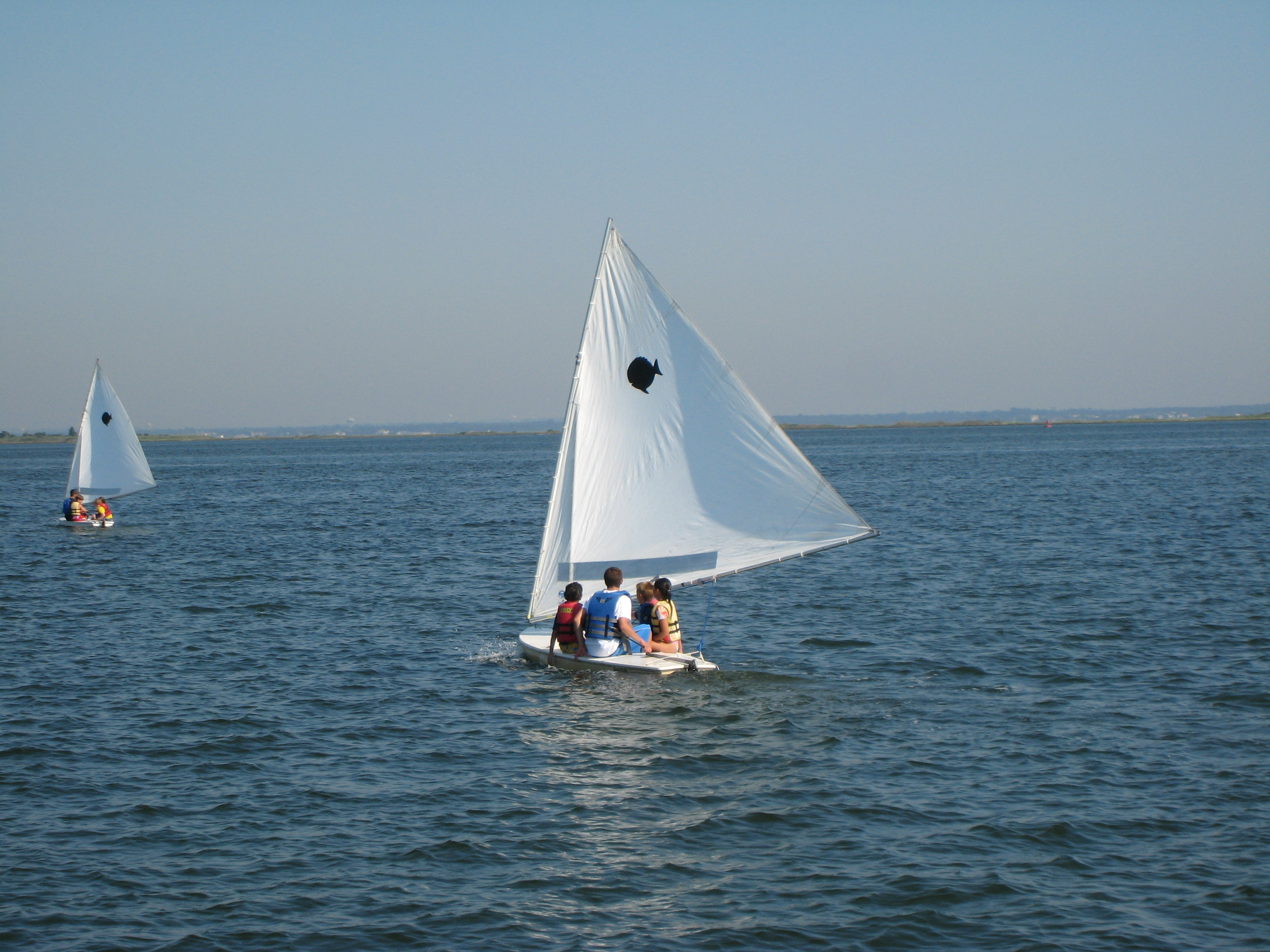
Children learning to sail in Dunewood, New York

=== Beginnings of Alcort, Inc. ===
In 1945, Alex Bryan and Cortlandt Heyniger created the Alcort company to produce their first boat design, the Sailfish. Originally framing carpenters by trade, these two entrepreneurs began their sailcraft endeavors building iceboats as a sideline. A proposal to build a lifesaving paddleboard for the Red Cross came their way. They determined the concept unfeasible as it stood. An improved design sporting a sailing canoe sail rig did however strike a spark as a possible profit making venture. From that humble beginning the Sailfish was born. After Bryan's wife, Aileen Bryan, suggested a boat with a small cockpit where she could put her feet, the design was updated to the Sunfish.

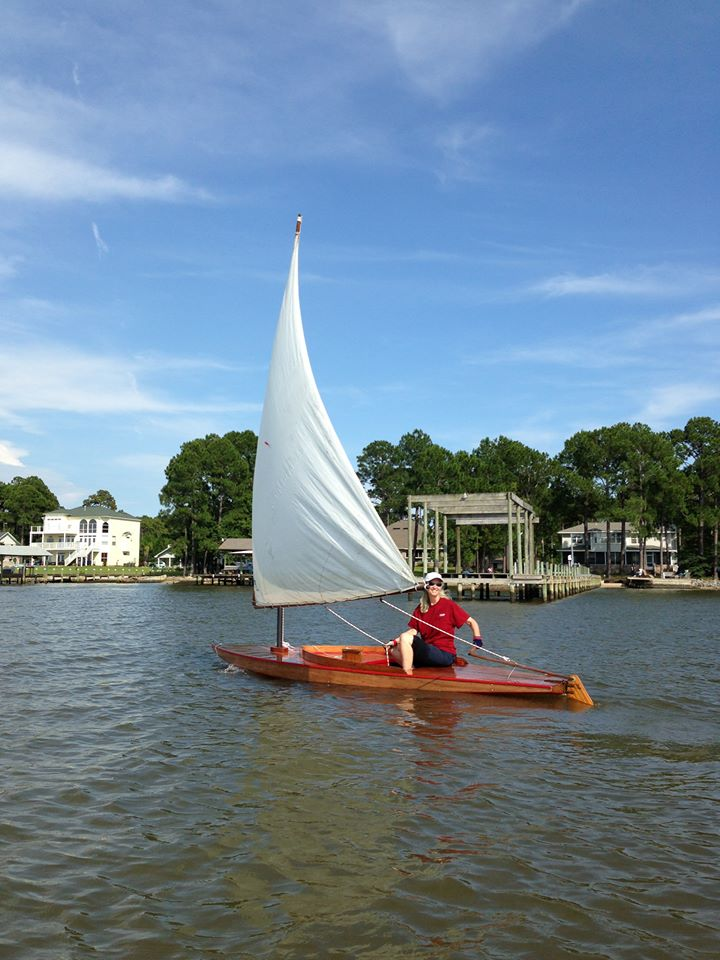
Sunfish (wooden; 1953)

=== The kit boat niche ===
The first Sailfish were offered in the form of detailed drawings for the backyard builder or as a finished, ready-to-sail boat, built by the Alcort shop. In the course of growing their business, Cortlandt and Alex had the revelation to kit the boat by supplying pre-cut pieces, all the necessary fittings, and inclusion of the sail thereby making backyard construction more appealing to an even wider range of would-be boat builders. Sunfish first appeared as either a DIY kit or a finished boat. Of the two designs, only the Sailfish was originally a blueprint plan boat.

=== Waypoints ===
- For the 1960 model year, Sunfish became available in a fiberglass version for the first time. Alcort shop-built wood boats were phased out around the same period, however, the Sunfish kit boat remained available through the late 1960s.
- 1971 found a storage compartment added to the rear of the cockpit.
- 1972 model saw a revision of the rudder blade's shape, the rudder's gudgeon and pintle, a new shape daggerboard, and a switch to a Sunfish designed cockpit bailer. This was a turning point for those pieces of equipment, thereafter referred as "New Style" by owners of Sunfish from that era.
- Every few years, hardware and sometimes cosmetics and/or sail colors evolve, adding a piece or two of something more contemporary to replace outdated technology or style.
- In 1969, when AMF took over Sunfish production from Alcort, Inc., one of the expansion strategies was to form the Sunfish (racing) Class Association to help promote the boat through organized sailing competition. (Note: One-Design Sunfish racing remains a "manufacturer's Class" for mutual support and true to all one-on-one style racing, competing boats must conform to One Design and Class Rules in order to qualify to race in sanctioned events. Recreational use boats may be modified as the owner chooses and need not conform to anything more than the local boating safety regulations in effect where the boat is sailed.)
- In 1989 the fused deck to hull joint was changed from a ½" flat lip protected by an aluminum trim strip to the increased surface area of a rounded gunwale, now more securely bonded using a methacrylate adhesive specially suited for fiberglass.
- Sail geometry has changed on a couple of occasions, most significantly in 1989 when the "Racing Sail", still 75 ft^{2} "sail area", but with deeper draft, was made available as an option.
- In 2010 the last of the Sunfish's wood attributes were superseded when first the rudder and now this year the tiller were changed from wood components to fiberglass and aluminum respectively.
- The Sunfish was inducted into the American Sailboat Hall of Fame in 1995.
- Since its introduction in 1952, Sunfish has come under the stewardship of seven successive builders (see Sunfish Builder Chronology below).

=== Sunfish builder chronology ===
1952–1969	Alcort, Inc. (founded 1945)
1969–1986	AMF
1986–1988	Loveless & DeGarmo, dba, Alcort Sailboats Inc.
1988–1991	Pearson Yacht Co.
1991–1997	Sunfish/Laser, Inc.
1997–2007	Vanguard
2007–2024	Laser Performance
2024–	Zim Sailing (ISCA Builder Only)
2025 -	SERO Innovation

== Sunfish in racing ==
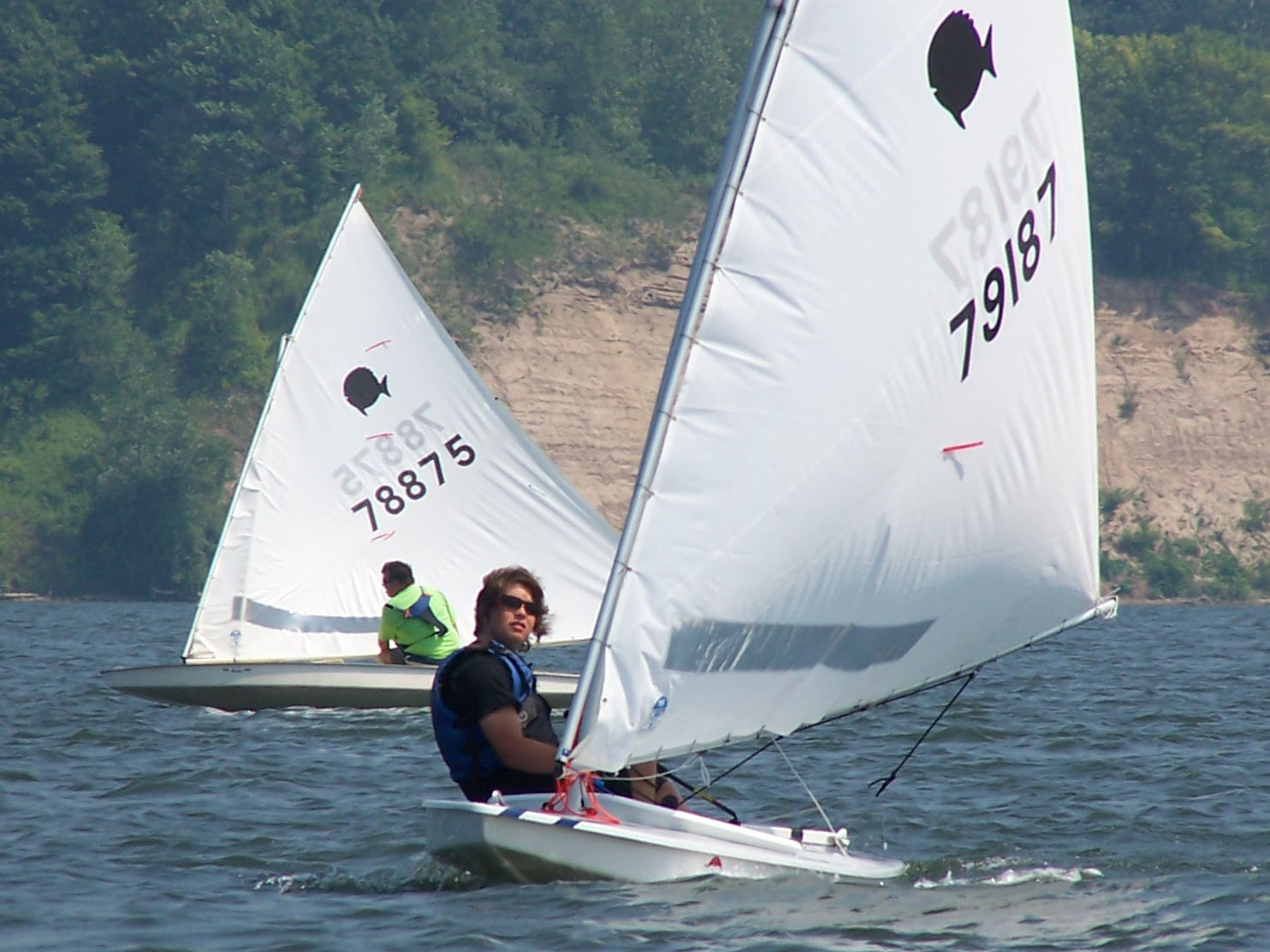
A race rigged Sunfish racing on Irondequoit Bay, NY. The racing setup seen in these photos shows the sail closer to the deck than the typical recreational rigging would be.

For most One-Design Class eligible boats, the number of boats built and the number of boats registered in the racing class are closely related. This makes the boat and the racing Class practically one and the same. The Sunfish is an anomaly to this more familiar symbiotic relationship.

The Sunfish Class Association reported in 2001 that Sunfish production had exceeded 300,000 boats. The registrar for One Design sailing in the United States, US Sailing, reported in a 2004 survey that Sunfish Class membership numbered 1,573. This does not mean Sunfish isn't a preferred race boat. On the contrary, at 1,573 Class members, Sunfish ranks in the upper percentile of boats involved with organized racing in the U.S. It does, however, demonstrate the boat's above average versatility to suit a broader range of sailing applications.

=== Fun racing ===
Recreational usage played a key role in establishing the popularity of the Alcort boat designs. Events such as the Connecticut River race, Seattle's Duck Dodge, and the Hampton Roads Sunfish Challenge & Dinghy Distance Race, are recreational examples for Sunfish sailors.

=== Open class racing ===
Sunfish sailors who are more serious about sailing competitions, but who do not have the advantage of a nearby Sunfish fleet, can race their boat against nearly any other make and model of sailboat in "open class" events using a handicap system. Sunfish have a base-line Portsmouth handicap of 99.6.

=== One-design racing (ISCA) ===
One-design racing uses nearly identical boats so the competition is based purely on sailing skill. One Design Classes are watched over by a governing body who assure conformity. (Note: ISCA Racing is in accordance with the Sunfish Class Rule Book and ISAF Racing Rules of Sailing (RRS).)

The International Sunfish Class Association – development

- In 1969 AMF was instrumental in forming the Sunfish (racing) Class Association.
- In 1984 the Sunfish Class became recognized by the International Yacht Racing Union, today known as the International Sailing Federation (ISAF).
- A year later the Sunfish Class went independent as the International Sunfish Class Association (ISCA).
- Sunfish gained Pan American Games status in 1999 and has maintained recognition in the following years.
- International Masters was held outside the United States, in the Netherlands, for the first time in 2005.
- There are three continental and nine national championships regularly.
- Sunfish fleets are active in 28 countries around the globe.

=== Sunfish 60th anniversary ===
To celebrate 60 years of the Sunfish, the builder at the time, Laser Performance, designed a 60th anniversary edition of the Sunfish to celebrate the diverse history of the boat and the sailors who love it. Laser Performance also hosted a Sunfish 60th anniversary celebration at Noyes Pond in Massachusetts, the home of Sunfish designer Al Bryan, which gathered over 100 people sailing old and new Sunfish.

== Super Sunfish ==
Super Sunfish
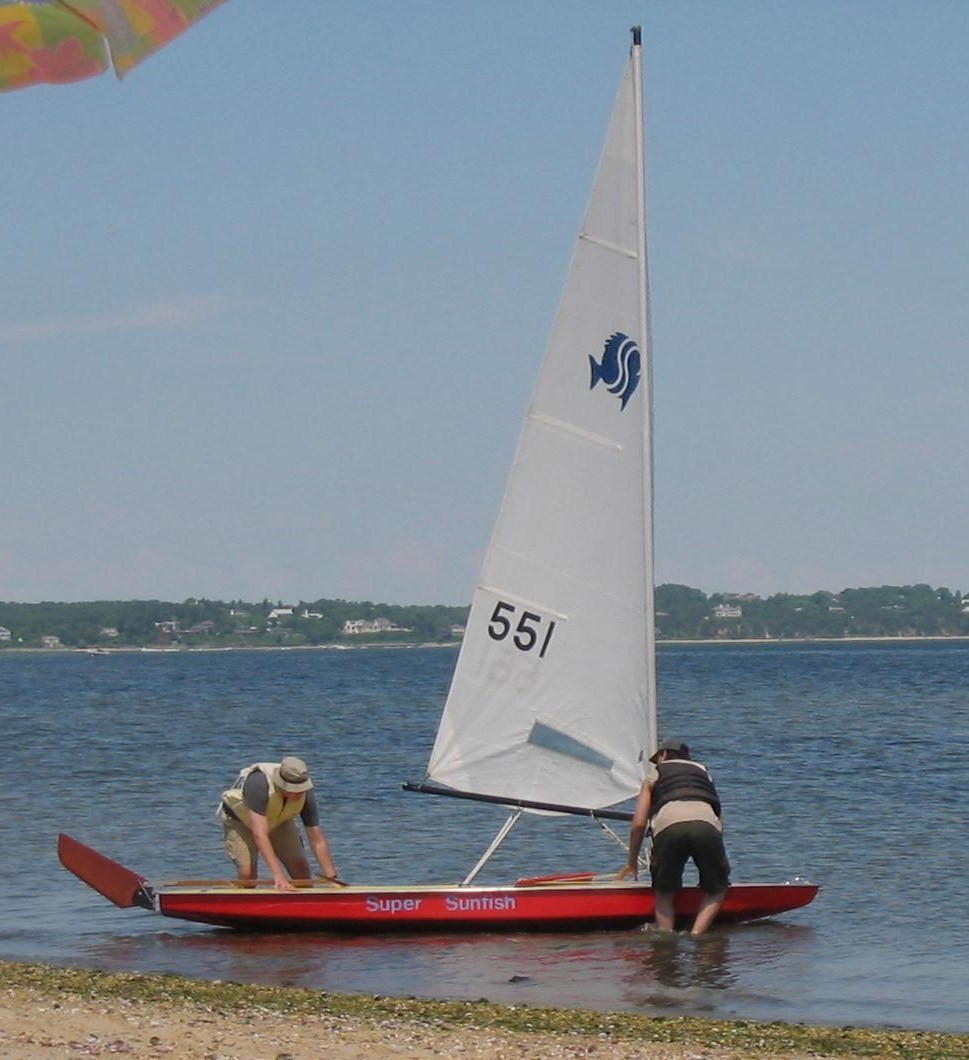
- Launching a Super Sunfish on Shinnecock Bay

Development
- Designer: John Black Lee / AMF
- Year: 1974 (production version)
- Design: Development Class

Boat
- Crew: 1–2

Hull
- Type: Monohull
- Construction: Fiberglass
- Hull weight: 129 pounds (59 kg)
- LOA: 13 feet 10 inches (4.22 m)
- Beam: 4 feet 1 inch (1.24 m)

Hull appendages
- Keel: Daggerboard

Rig
- Rig type: Bermuda rig

Sails
- Mainsail area: 65 square feet (6.0 m^{2})

Rating
- D-PN: 100.7

In the 1960s, a member of the New Canaan, Conn. Sunfish Fleet, John Black Lee, independently experimented with a conventional sail rig for the Sunfish. He developed a high-aspect ratio sail that worked on the Sunfish hull and christened his design the Formula S. The high aspect ratio sail plan has better upwind performance characteristics over the lateen sail, changing the boat's handling to point more like other Bermuda rig sailboats in its size. With this configuration, complexity of sail control is elevated by the addition of dynamic outhaul, downhaul, and mainsheet traveller lines.

Lee's concept didn't interest Alcort, Inc. as a production model so he refit conversion boats independently and sparked organization of Formula S fleets. A few years after their 1969 purchase of Alcort, Inc., AMF revisited the idea of a high aspect ratio rig for the Sunfish. AMF did not choose to adopt Lee's Formula S design, but they did develop their own variation, calling it the Super Sunfish. The existing Formula S fleet eventually became assimilated into the ranks of AMF Super Sunfish fleets.

The Super Sunfish was available from 1974 to 1984. AMF marketed this more conventional sail plan as a performance version of the Sunfish in an attempt to compete with, among others, the newly emerging Laser. Portsmouth handicap numbers, however, place the Laser slightly faster. With its hard chine hull, the Super Sunfish is the more stable boat, so it is a tradeoff between the two designs.

The Super Sunfish was offered as a complete package and as a kit to retrofit existing lateen rigged Sunfish. The literature points out the sail systems can be easily swapped on a single Sunfish hull to accommodate different sailors' preferences.

North American Portsmouth numbers
Centerboard class	USSA code	DPN	BN 0-1	BN 2-3	BN 4	BN 5–9
Sunfish	SF	99.6	102.9	100.3	97.7	95.6
Super Sunfish	SSF	100.7	102.4	102.3	99.3	(95.8)
