= Harken =

Sailing equipment manufacturer in Wisconsin, US

Coordinates: 43.0506478°N 88.2439048°W

Harken, Inc.

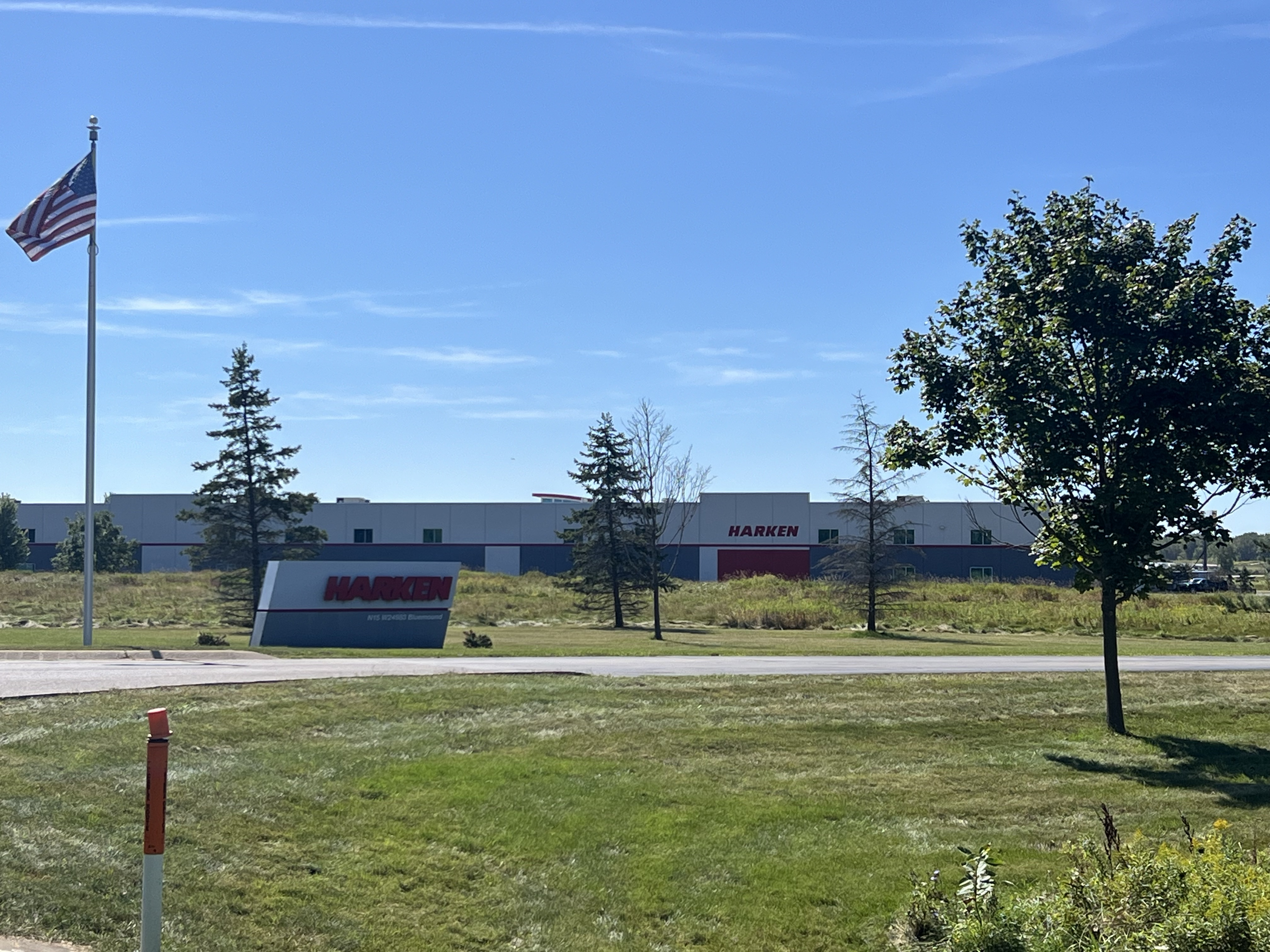
- headquarters
- Type: Private
- Industry: Sailing; Commercial marine Work at height Utilities; Access and rescue Wind power Architectural; Stage and theater Contract Manufacturing; Canvas
- Founded: 1967
- Founders: Peter Harken, Olaf Harken
- Headquarters: Pewaukee, Wisconsin, U.S.
- Area served: Worldwide
- Key people: Peter Harken, (Chairman); Olaf Harken, (Chairman)
- Website: www.harken.com

Harken, Inc. is an international manufacturer specializing in performance sailing hardware, headquartered in Pewaukee, Wisconsin, United States. The company was founded in a 60-foot trailer in 1967 by brothers Peter Harken and Olaf Harken. Originally, the brothers manufactured sailboats under the name Vanguard and kept the hardware business separate so they could sell to competing boatbuilders. Gary Comer, founder of Lands' End clothing company, advised and helped them distribute their first blocks by placing them in the Lands' End catalogue.

In 1986, Vanguard Sailboats was spun off to Stephen Clark in Rhode Island so that the brothers could focus on hardware. Harken hardware has been a dominant force in the racing segment for many years, making its Olympic and America's Cup debuts in 1976 and 1977, respectively.

Harken's primary manufacturing plants are the Pewaukee headquarters and the Italian office in Limido Comasco, Como. Harken has sales and service offices in USA (Rhode Island, California, Florida), France, Japan, Poland, Slovenia, Sweden, Australia, New Zealand, and the United Kingdom.

Harken equipment may be found on racing boats as small as the 7-foot Optimist (dinghy) to mega yachts and ocean racers.
