= Force 5 =

Type of sailboat

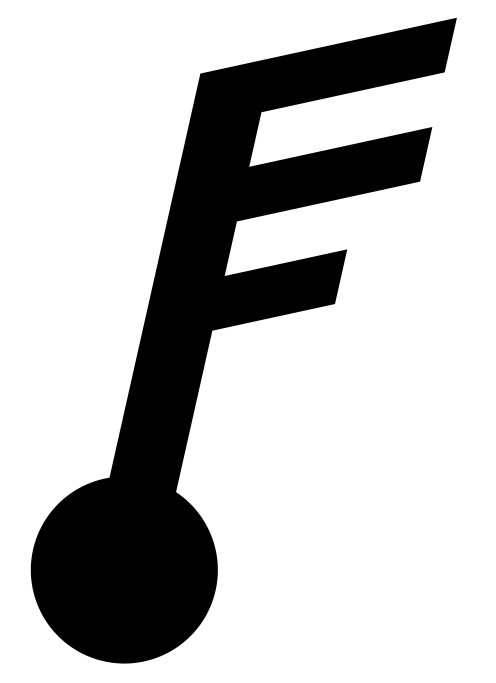
- Class symbol

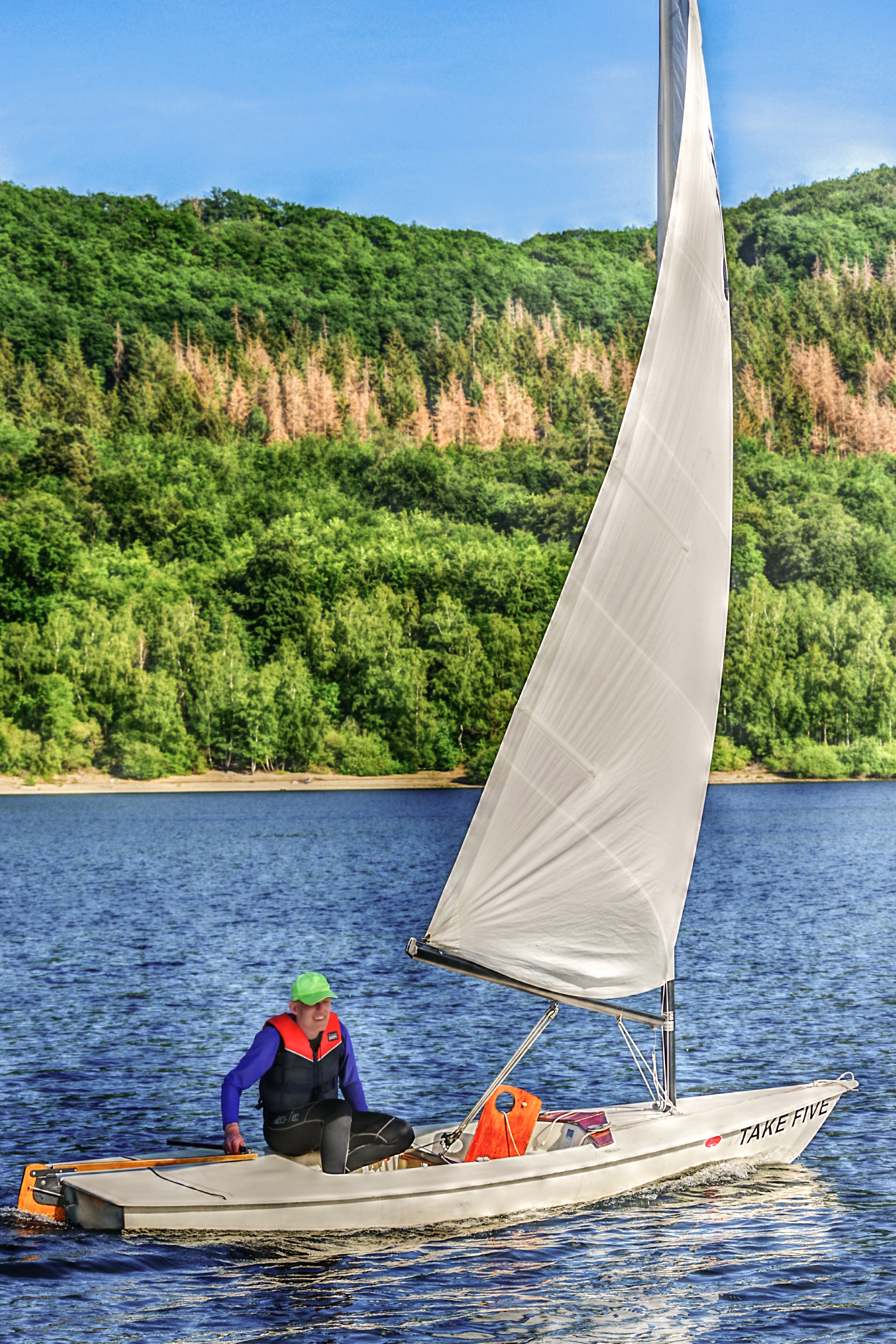

Development
- Designer: Fred Scott and Jack Evans
- Location: USA
- Year: 1972
- Design: One-Design
- Name: Force 5

Boat
- Crew: 1
- Draft: max 3 ft 2 in min 3 in

Hull
- Hull weight: 145 lb
- LOA: 13 ft (4.0 m)
- LWL: 13 ft 2 in
- Beam: 4 ft (1.2 m)

Hull appendages
- Keel: Daggerboard

Rig
- Rig type: cat-rigged; Bermuda rig

Sails
- Mainsail area: 91 sq ft

Racing
- D-PN: 95.4

The Force 5 is a small one-design racing sailboat that is similar to the more well known Laser but with a hard chine aft. Although it is designed for single-handed racing, two people can easily fit into the large cockpit. The boats are products of Weeks Yacht Yard on Long Island, New York.

== History ==
The Force 5 was designed in 1972 by Fred Scott and Jack Evans who were well known for their boat designs. AMF Alcort manufactured the boats in increasing quantities and by the late 1970s the boat and class was highly popular. In 1989, Pearson Small Boats, which owned AMF at that time, was bought out by SLI who also owned the rights for Laser sailboats. Because the boats were similar they decided to concentrate on only one model and the Laser won out, eventually becoming more popular and causing the production of Force 5 boats to cease. Eventually, Weeks Yacht Yard bought the rights to the boat and it was re-introduced at the 1994 SAIL EXPO in Atlantic City, New Jersey and it continues to be produced in Patchogue, on the Great South Bay of Long Island.

== Rigging ==
The Force 5 has full sail controls, including a cunningham, outhaul, boom vang, and traveller. The mainsail has a sleeve which fits over the 3-piece aluminum mast. A junior sail is available with reduced sail area for better handling when used by lower weight individuals under 185 lbs. The rudder and centerboard are solid varnished mahogany but recently fiberglass versions became available.
