= Laser Pico =

Type of sailing dinghy

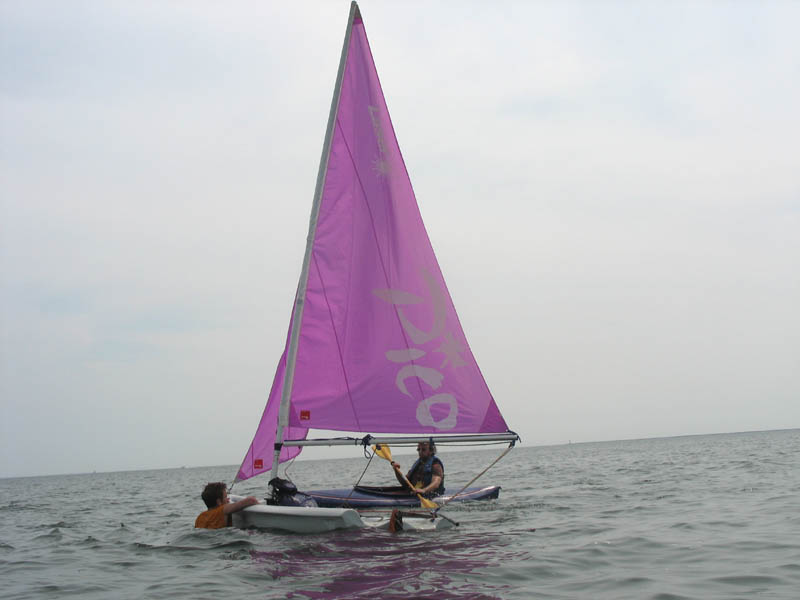
A Laser Pico

The Laser Pico dinghy is a small sailboat designed by Jo Richards in the mid-1990s and used primarily for training and day sailing. It can be crewed by one or two children or an adult. Current models come equipped with both a mainsail and a jib, the jib however mainly functions as a training tool and provides little to no contribution to speed, however it does allow the boat to point higher into wind. The Pico functions mainly as a training boat for younger children because of its very durable nature and has little to no racing events dedicated to it.

The hull is of thermoplastic sandwich construction, providing strength, stiffness, and built-in buoyancy. The cockpit is self-draining. The boat comes equipped with an aluminium two-piece mast, an aluminium boom, and a lifting rudder. A sport version is available which includes a battened Mylar sail and upgraded running rigging. The Ocean Play manufactured Pico uses a vertical battened dacron sail as standard.

Laser Performance used to be the manufacturer of the Pico, and sold over 15,000 of these boats, but stopped supplying in 2022. The RS Marine Group under the brand name Ocean Play now supplies the Pico. Ocean Play was founded in 2022 after Jo Richards (designer of the four boats) approached RS to take up the production challenge. Besides the Pico, Ocean Play also produces other products that were originally sold by Laser Performance.

The first UK National championships were held on 27–29 May 2006 at Gurnard Sailing Club on the Isle of Wight, the Pico's spiritual home. Gurnard also hosted the 2007 event, while in 2008 the Pico nationals were held at Thorpe Bay Yacht Club as were the 2009 Pico nationals. The 2010 Pico nationals were held at Rydal Penrhos School. The 2011 were set to be at Thorpe Bay however they were cancelled.

The Laser Pico has no active Class Association with the last remnants of the website being removed in 2013.

== Specifications ==
- Length: 3.50 m (11 ft 6 in)
- Beam: 1.43 m (4 ft 8 in)
- Hull weight: 60 kg (130 lb)
- Mainsail: 5.1 m^{2} (55 ft^{2})
- Sport mainsail: 6.44 m^{2} (69.3 ft^{2})
- Jib: 1.57 m^{2} (16.9 ft^{2})
- RYA Portsmouth Yardstick: 1330
- D-PN: 104.6
