= El Rincón del Vago =

Spanish-language web portal

- Available in: Spanish
- Website: www.rincondelvago.com
- Launched: 1998

El Rincón del Vago (Spanish for "Lazybones's corner") is a Spanish-language web portal that offers content for students.

Established in 1998 and held by Orange España, it offers a public access repository of information, notably monographs. It is very popular among students. This content is uploaded by its own community and can be easily reused by other students.

The website was created in 1998 in Calle Toro, in the Spanish city of Salamanca, and in a relatively short time it had gained a great deal of popularity in Spain, being a site of particular interest to students and teachers, especially the latter, in order to avoid copying or plagiarising from the former, and to obtain a work of study easily and without the least effort.

Ángel Benito, who had been involved in the project from the beginning, described the process: "The first version of the site was uploaded in February 1998 with only 6 works. In a few months, the portal's mailboxes were flooded with thousands of works. The name "Rincón del Vago" spread by word of mouth through the corridors of the faculties and institutes, and we grew without needing to invest in advertising. Within a few months, the first advertising agencies were knocking on our door, and soon after, large companies were interested in acquiring us. It was the golden age before the dotcom bubble. In the end it was Eresmás Interactiva that bought the portal. Through various corporate successions, we went from Eresmás to Wanadoo and from there to Orange".

Teachers use it as well to discover plagiarism.
