= Ian Bruce (sailor) =

Canadian sailor

Personal information
- Nationality: Canadian
- Born: 7 June 1933 Kingston, Jamaica
- Died: 21 March 2016 (aged 82) Hamilton, Ontario, Canada

Sport
- Sport: Sailing

Ian Bruce, CM (7 June 1933 – 21 March 2016) was a Canadian sailor. He competed at the 1960 Summer Olympics and the 1972 Summer Olympics. Along with Bruce Kirby, he invented the laser dinghy, which has been used at the Olympics since 1996.

== Biography ==
Bruce was born in Kingston, Jamaica in 1933, before moving to Nassau, Bahamas after World War II. He then moved to Canada, where he attended Trinity College School in Port Hope, Ontario, before studying at McGill University in Montreal. He married his wife, Barbara, in 1958. Her brother was Donald Brittain, a film director for the National Film Board of Canada.

Bruce competed at two Olympic Games. At the 1960 Summer Olympics in Rome, Bruce competed in the Finn event, where he finished in seventh place. At the 1972 Summer Olympics in Munich, he raced in the Star event, finishing in twelfth place.

Outside of competing as a sailor, Bruce along with Bruce Kirby designed the laser dinghy in 1970. It was made available for commercial use the following year, before being used at the Olympics in 1996. His company was producing up to 18,000 boats per year during its peak. He was involved in the design or development of many international classes, including the 29er, Byte, Contender, Finn and Laser Radial.

Bruce was a two-time winner of the Prince of Wales Trophy in sailing, and in 2009, he was honoured with the Order of Canada. He died in Hamilton, Ontario from cancer, at the age of 82.
