= Laser Vago =

Sailboat class

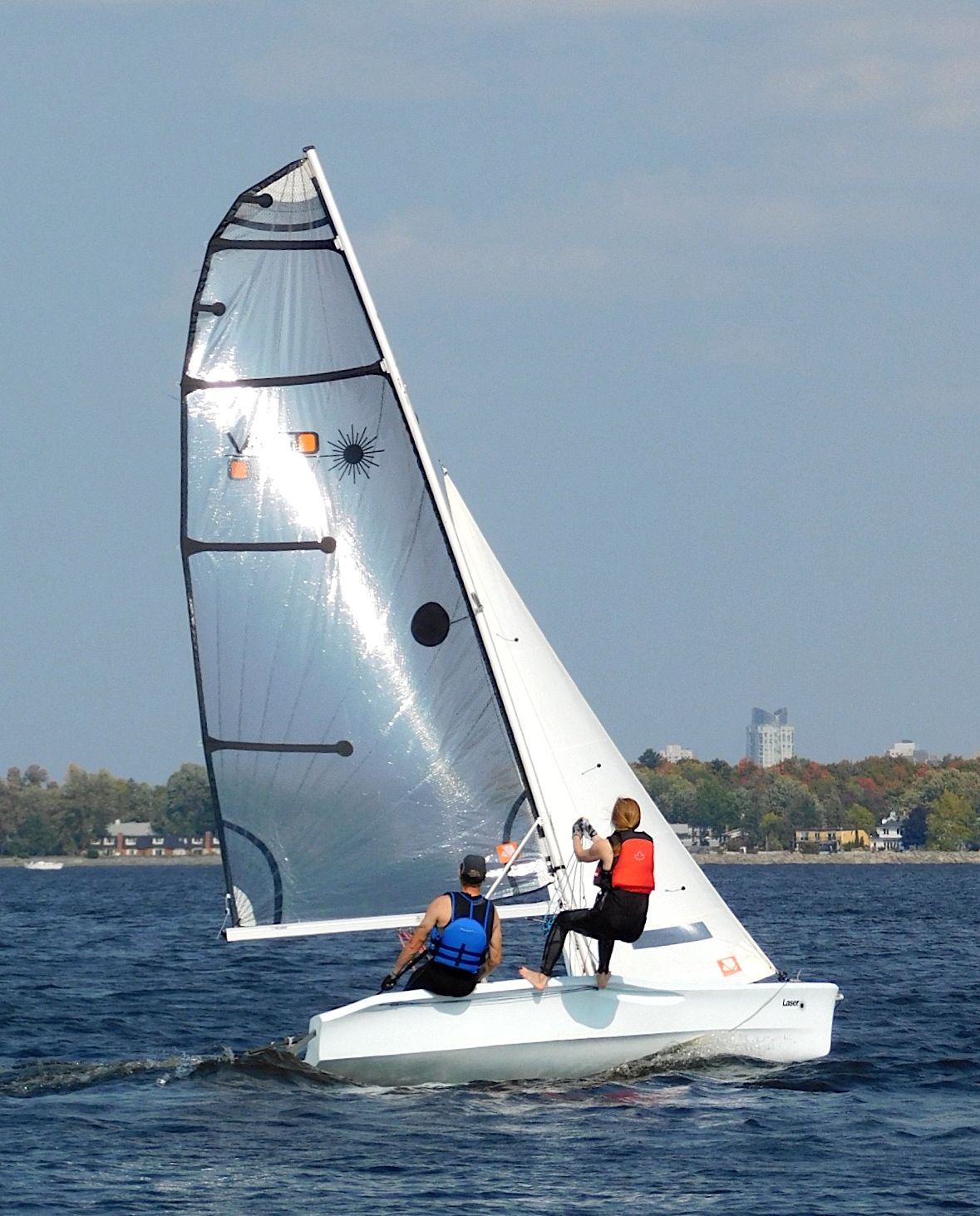

Development
- Designer: Jo Richards
- Location: United Kingdom; United States
- Year: 2005
- Builder: LaserPerformance
- Role: One-design racer

Boat
- Displacement: 234 lb (106 kg)
- Draft: 3.77 ft (1.15 m) with daggerboard down

Hull
- Type: Monohull
- Construction: Rotational moulded polyethylene tri-skin foam sandwich
- LOA: 13.78 ft (4.20 m)
- Beam: 5.12 ft (1.56 m)

Hull appendages
- Keel: centreboard
- Rudder: transom-mounted rudder

Rig
- Rig type: Bermuda rig

Sails
- Sailplan: Fractional rigged sloop
- Mainsail area: 81.38 sq ft (7.560 m^{2})
- Jib/genoa area: 29.92 sq ft (2.780 m^{2})
- Spinnaker area: 116.79 sq ft (10.850 m^{2})
- Total sail area: 139.00 sq ft (12.914 m^{2})

Rating
- RYA PN: 1074

The Laser Vago is a British/American sailing dinghy that was designed by Jo Richards as a one-design racer and first built in 2005.

== Production ==
The design was built starting in 2005 by LaserPerformance in United Kingdom and in the United States. As of March 2025 Performance Sailcraft became the current manufacturer of the Vago which is built in the UK.

== Design ==
The Laser Vago is a recreational sailboat, with then hull built predominantly of rotational moulded polyethylene tri-skin foam sandwich. The hull has a sharply single chined design. It has a fractional sloop rig, a raked stem, a plumb transom, a transom-hung rudder controlled by a tiller and a retractable daggerboard. It displaces 234 lb (106 kg).

The boat has a draft of 3.77 ft (1.15 m) with the daggerboard extended. With the daggerboard removed the boat can be beached or transported on a trailer or car roof rack.

There are "standard" and XD "race" models, with the latter model equipped with sails of larger area. The boat is rated as a skill level of intermediate to advanced.

For sailing the design may be equipped with an asymmetrical spinnaker, flown from a retractable bowsprit and a single trapeze.

The design has a Royal Yacht Club Portsmouth Yardstick racing average handicap of 1074 and is normally raced with a crew of one or two sailors. The optimal crew weight is 176 to 331 lb (80 to 150 kg).

== Operational history ==
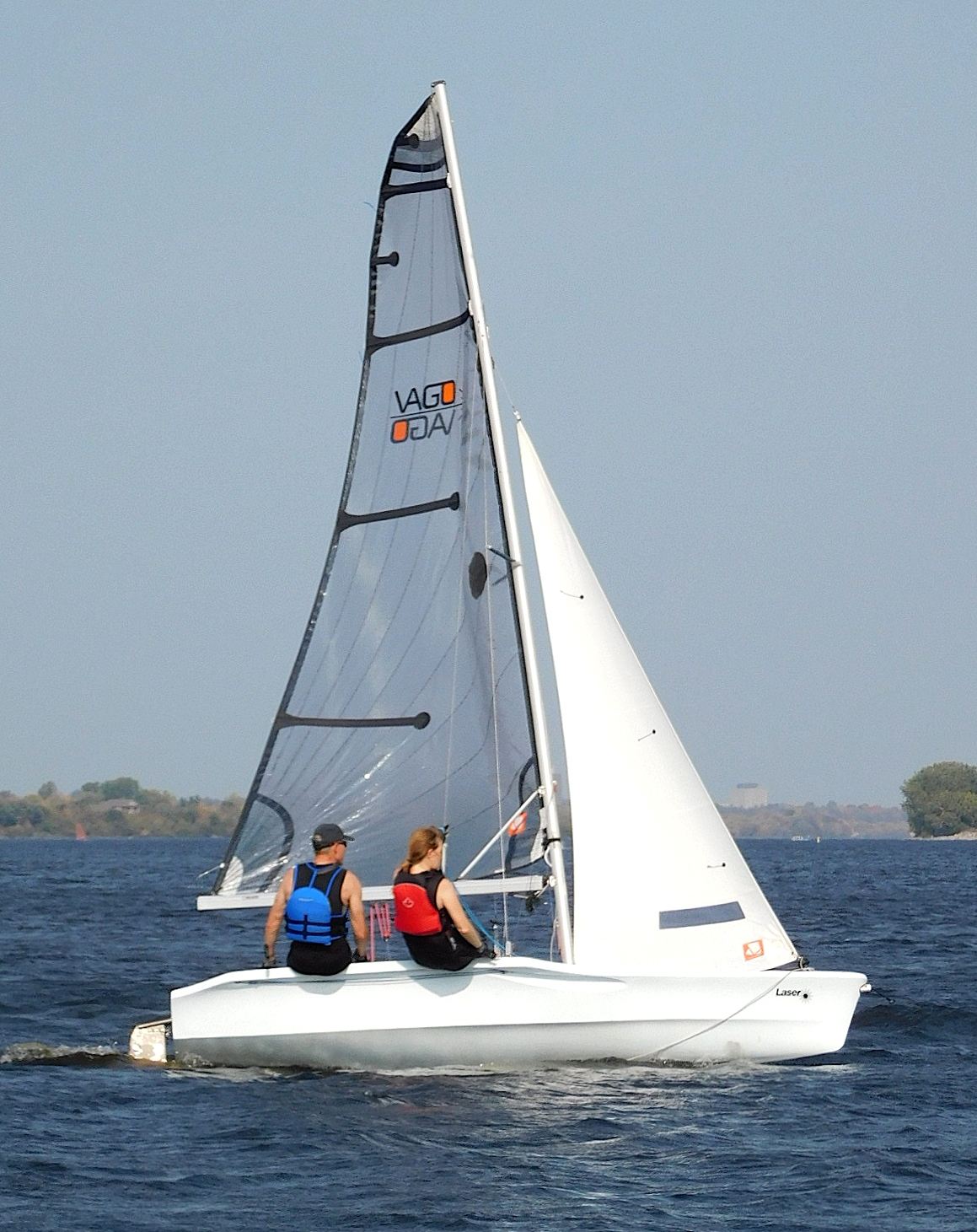
Laser Vago, showing hull chine.

The boat was named Sailing World magazine's "Best One-Design Dinghy" for 2007.

In a 2007 review for Sailing World, Chuck Allen wrote, "This boat is designed to be many things; singlehander, doublehander, fast trainer, and all-around fun, planing dinghy for whoever feels the need for speed in an inexpensive, durable design. Several key design features enable this 13'9" rocketship to get on a plane sooner than similar dinghies. The hard chine Richards designed into the hull combines with its rocker, which makes the boat handle like a dream during maneuvers. Its flared gunwales provide flotation and good righting moment. The XD version, which has 30 more square feet of sail area than the standard Vago, as well as a trapeze, is, quite simply, a ton of fun to sail ... Overall, sailing the boat is a great experience mostly because of the speed."

== See also ==
- List of sailing boat types
