= Vanguard 15 =

Sailboat class

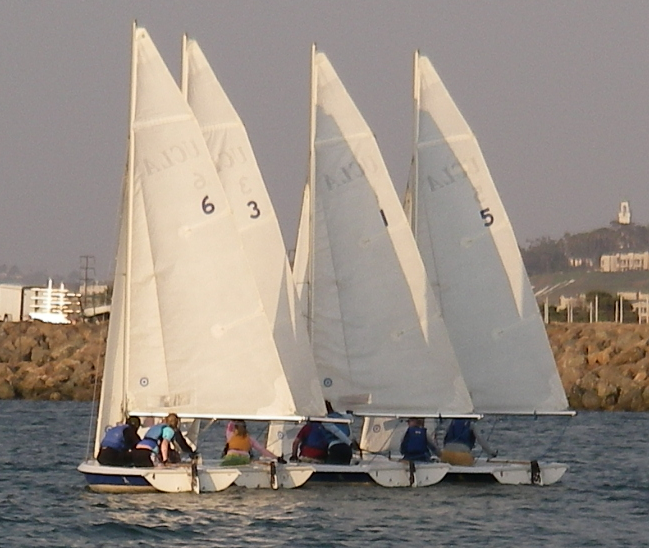

Development
- Designer: Bob Ames
- Location: United States
- Year: 1992
- Builders: Team Vanguard; LaserPerformance
- Role: One-design racer
- Name: Vanguard 15

Boat
- Crew: two
- Displacement: 200 lb (91 kg)
- Draft: 3.42 ft (1.04 m) with the daggerboard down

Hull
- Type: Monohull
- Construction: Fiberglass
- LOA: 15.25 ft (4.65 m)
- LWL: 15.00 ft (4.57 m)
- Beam: 5.50 ft (1.68 m)

Hull appendages
- Keel: daggerboard
- Rudder: transom-mounted rudder

Rig
- Rig type: Bermuda rig

Sails
- Sailplan: Fractional rigged sloop
- Mainsail area: 77 sq ft (7.2 m^{2})
- Jib/genoa area: 48 sq ft (4.5 m^{2})
- Total sail area: 125 sq ft (11.6 m^{2})

The Vanguard 15 is an American planing sailing dinghy that was designed by Bob Ames as a one-design racer and first built in 1992.

== Production ==
The design was built by Team Vanguard in the United States and later by LaserPerformance, but is no longer in production.

== Design ==
The Vanguard 15 is a recreational sailboat, built predominantly of fiberglass. It has a fractional sloop rig with aluminum spars, a raked stem, a vertical transom, a transom-hung rudder controlled by a tiller and a retractable daggerboard. It displaces 200 lb (91 kg) and is capable of planing upwind.

The boat has a draft of 3.42 ft (1.04 m) with the daggerboard extended and 6 in (15 cm) with it retracted, allowing beaching or ground transportation on a trailer or car roof rack.

For sailing the design is equipped with a boom vang and the mainsail and jib have windows for improved visibility. The halyards are external and the mast is of a non-tapered design. The boat is normally raced with a crew of two sailors.

The design has a hull speed of 5.19 kn (9.61 km/h).

== Operational history ==
In a 1994 review Richard Sherwood wrote, "the Vanguard 15 is designed for college/yacht club racing fleets. Rig is simple, and the boat is a strict one-design. The deck is rounded, for easy hiking ... With the daggerboard and light weight, the boat may be easily dry sailed — often helpful for fleet sailing."

A 2013 review in Sail1Design noted "the Vanguard 15 boasts one of the strongest class associations of any one-design fleet, running hundreds of events each year. With fleets located across the country, there are opportunities to get involved from the club level to championship regattas. The V15 is a popular club level fleet racer as well as team racer."

In 2014, a Vanguard 15 one-design racer, John Storck III, reported that the boat was falling out of favor with college sailors and that attendance at regattas was declining.

== See also ==
- List of sailing boat types
