= LaserPerformance =

Sailboat manufacturer

- Type: Private company
- Industry: Dinghy sailing
- Founded: 1969
- Headquarters: Europe: Setúbal, Portugal; Long Buckby, England; North America: Norwalk, CT
- Website: www.laserperformance.com

LaserPerformance is an Anglo-American dinghy manufacturer. LaserPerformance manufactures many sailboats including: Laser, Sunfish, Bug, Laser Vago, Laser Bahia, Club FJ, Club 420, Z420, Vanguard 15, Dart 16, Funboat and Optimists.

== Background ==
On a phone call between Canadians Bruce Kirby and Ian Bruce in 1969, the pair discussed the possibility of a car-topped dinghy (a boat small enough to be carried on a roof rack of a typical car) for a line of camping equipment. Kirby resultantly sketched out what would be known as "the million dollar doodle." Following his "doodle" Kirby developed working drawings that Ian Bruce used to develop the Laser.

The plans stayed with Kirby and Bruce until 1970 when One Design and Offshore Yachtsman magazine held a regatta for boats under $1000, called "America's Teacup." After a few sail modifications, the Laser easily won its class.

The prototype was originally named the "Weekender"; the sail held the letters TGIF, a common American abbreviation for "Thank God It's Friday." Ian Bruce renamed the boat the "Laser" (after the scientific mechanism), and officially unveiled at the New York Boat Show in 1971.

The first world championship was held in 1974 in Bermuda. The Laser became a men's Olympic-class boat at the 1996 Summer Olympics in Atlanta, with a special Olympic edition of the boat released that year in commemoration. A version with a smaller sail, the Laser Radial, was first sailed as a women's Olympic-class boat at the 2008 Summer Olympics. Followed by a youth version known as the 4.7.

== History ==
Neither Bruce nor Kirby had the financial or manufacturing capability to mass-produce and market the boat, and so sold a series of manufacturing licenses to existing boat manufacturers, each with an exclusive geographic sales region:

- Europe: Performance Sailcraft based in Long Buckby, Northampton, England
- North America: Vanguard Sailboats of Portsmouth, RI
- Australia and Oceania: Performance Sailcraft Australia

Each was licensed to manufacture the basic craft, under strict one design rules. Each builder produced the Laser 1 and 2 but it was LaserPerformance Europe which diluted the brand most by introducing boats such as the Laser 2000, Laser 4000, Laser 5000, Laser Bahia, Laser SB3. The company was also responsible for the Dart Catamaran brand, and a range of rotomoulded plastic dinghies.

In 2007 Performance Sailcraft Europe and Vanguard merged to create LaserPerformance.

== Sunfish ==
The Sunfish sailboat is a personal size, beach launched sailing dinghy utilizing a pontoon type hull carrying a lateen sail mounted to an un-stayed mast.

Sunfish was developed by Alcort, Inc. and first appeared around 1952 as the "next generation" improvement on their original boat, the Sailfish. In contrast, the Sunfish has a wider beam for more stability, increased freeboard and the addition of a foot-well for a more comfortable sailing position. Sunfish began as a wood hull design and progressed to fiberglass construction just a few years after its introduction.

Upgrades can be added to enhance sail control for competitive sailing.

Due to the broad appeal of the Sunfish, in 1995 it was commended by The American Sailboat Hall of Fame for being "the most popular fiberglass boat ever designed, with a quarter million sold worldwide" (at that point in time). Today, the Sunfish brand-name has become so widely known it is often misapplied generically to refer to any brand of board-style boat sporting the characteristic lateen sail. Currently manufactured by LaserPerformance.

== Litigation and controversies ==
=== Breach of contract, unlawful Counterfeiting and Trademark Infringement ===
On March 4, 2013, Bruce Kirby, Inc., filed a complaint in the U.S. Federal Court District of Connecticut, alleging unlawful counterfeiting of the Kirby dinghy globally recognized as the Laser by LaserPerformance. LaserPerformance is the legal intellectual property owner of the Laser brand globally except in Oceania (includes Australia, New Zealand), Japan, and Korea.

This case also names the International Laser Class Association (ILCA) and the International Sailing Federation (ISAF) alleging they assisted LaserPerformance by continuing to supply ISAF plaques to the builder, after Kirby had given them formal notice to stop.

On June 13, 2013, LaserPerformance filed its Answer and Counter Claims in the United States District Court, District of Connecticut, alleging a scheme by Bruce Kirby, Inc., Global Sailing Limited, and Performance Sailcraft Pty. Ltd.

On February 14, 2020, a Connecticut Court gave a $6m verdict in favor of Laser designer Bruce Kirby in the long running dispute with LaserPerformance.

=== Laser Class ===
On March 27, 2019, ILCA revoked LaserPerformance's license to build Laser dinghies under the ILCA class brand. LPE now manufactures dinghies with the same design, now being called a Laser, and not an ILCA.

== Today ==
As of summer 2021, LaserPerformance remains in negotiations with the ILCA and has not signed a Builder's Agreement for Laser dinghies. At 2022 new boats Cascais and Portstar were announced.

As of June 2025, Laser Performance seems to be out of business, and their website https://www.laserperformance.com/ is for sale. In addition at least part of the contents of the factory in Portugal appears to have been seized and is being auctioned by an official body.
