= Vago, West Virginia =

- Unincorporated community
- Location within West Virginia Location within the United States
- Coordinates: 37°52′58″N 80°22′20″W
- Country: United States
- State: West Virginia
- County: Greenbrier
- Elevation: 2,326 ft (709 m)
- Time zone: UTC-5 (Eastern (EST))
  - Summer (DST): UTC-4 (EDT)
- Area codes: 304 & 681
- GNIS feature ID: 1555866

Vago is an unincorporated community in Greenbrier County, West Virginia, United States. Vago is 7 miles (11 km) north-northeast of Lewisburg. It is located on the Greenbrier River.

A post office called Vago was established in 1910, and remained in operation until it was discontinued in 1953.
