= Laser (dinghy) =

One-design sailing dinghy

ILCA
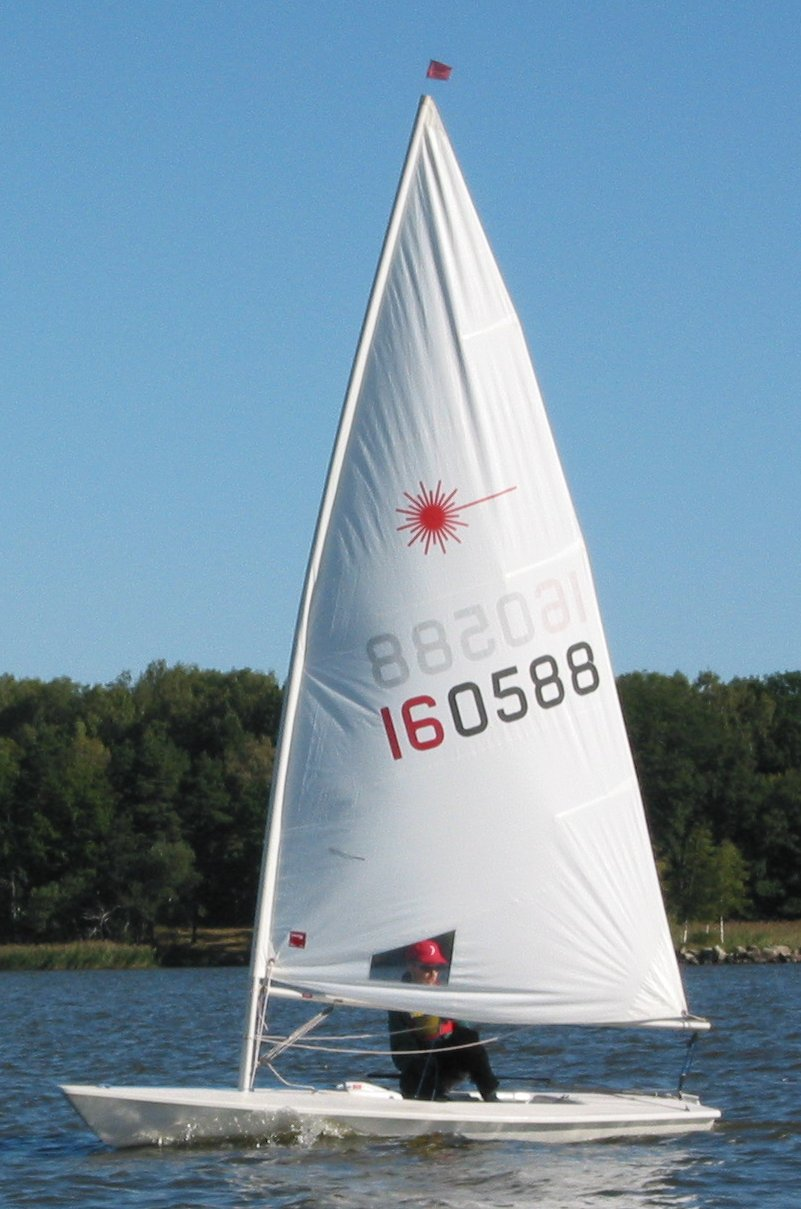
- ILCA 7

Development
- Designer: Bruce Kirby & Ian Bruce
- Location: Montreal, Canada
- Year: 1969
- Design: One-Design

Boat
- Crew: 1
- Draft: 0.787 m (2 ft 7.0 in)

Hull
- Construction: fiberglass
- Hull weight: 58.97 kg (130.0 lb)
- LOA: 4.23 m (13 ft 11 in)
- LWL: 3.81 m (12 ft 6 in)
- Beam: 1.37 m (4 ft 6 in)

Sails
- Mainsail area: 7.06 m^{2} (76.0 sq ft)

Racing
- D-PN: 91.1
- RYA PN: 1100 TBD
- PHRF: 217

The Laser (also known as ILCA) is a class of single-handed, one-design sailing dinghies using a common hull design with three interchangeable rigs of different sail areas, appropriate to a given combination of wind strength and crew weight. Ian Bruce and Bruce Kirby designed the Laser in 1970 and Hans Fogh designed the sail with an emphasis on simplicity and performance.

The ILCA is a widely produced class of dinghies. As of 2023, more than 223000 boats worldwide had been built. It is an international class with sailors in 120 countries, and an Olympic class since 1996. Its wide acceptance is attributable to its robust construction, simple rig and ease of sailing that offer competitive racing due to tight class association controls which eliminate differences in hull, sails, and equipment; the key pinnacles of the class, with a 1970s boat being identical to a boat made today.

The International Laser Class Association (ILCA) defines the specifications and competition rules for the boat but requires authorization by World Sailing, Performance Sailcraft Japan and PSA / Global Sailing who are known as legacy builders. The boat itself remains unchanged but is officially referred to as the ILCA Dinghy, due to a trademark dispute when the boat was called the Laser.

== History ==
In the 1967, Ian Bruce won International 14 World Championship sailing on a Mark III boat designed by Bruce Kirby and built by Ian himself. After the regatta, Ian realised that the cost of regatta sailing was beyond the reach of most people, including himself. He started a side business called Performance Sailcraft in an attempt to produce a lower-cost International 14 using his championship-winning hull as a mold. However, after two years, and around 100 boats produced, the boat was still too expensive due to its sophisticated design.

In 1969 a marketing offshoot of Canada's Hudson's Bay Company asked Ian Bruce, then working as a Montreal product developer, to come up with proposals for a line of outdoor sporting equipment. Among the proposals listed as a “maybe” was a lightweight “cartopper” sailboat designed to be transported on the roof of a car. He had no background in marine design, so, knowing Bruce Kirby through racing in the International 14 and Finn classes and through personal acquaintance between their wives, he arranged a meeting at a yacht club in Ottawa where he asked Kirby whether he could develop a new design.

The other day Kirby was in his office as editor of One-Design & Offshore Yachtsman magazine. He received a phone call from Ian. Ian was describing required features of a car-topped dinghy. Kirby was doodling ideas on a yellow legal pad, as he always did during the phone calls. As they were talking Kirby went completely quiet. Ian asked him "Are you still there?" to which he responded "Yes I'm here. I've got a design." This sketch would be known as "the million dollar doodle".

The designer took to the drawing board and calculator and worked for a few days drawing a full set of hull lines. Then came the profile and plan views, with daggerboard, rudder and cockpit, and finally the sail plan. The whole package was sent off to Ian's home in Pointe Claire along with a note suggesting that if his client didn't want a sailboat, he should put the plans away, as someday “we might make a buck on this boat.”

The marketing group passed on it, so the drawings went into Ian's bottom drawer. Six months later, in April 1970, their big break came. The advertising director of One-Design & Offshore hatched the 'America's Tea Cup', a regatta for new and nearly new small boats. Monohulls had to retail for no more than $1,000 and multihulls for no more than $1,200. It would be held at the Playboy Club on Lake Geneva, Wisconsin, in October.

Kirby called Ian and suggested this would be the perfect vehicle for introducing the new boat. The prototype was originally named the "Weekender", for a lack of a better name the sail held the letters "TGIF", a common American abbreviation for "Thank God it's Friday". Ian originally intended to build two prototypes for testing, but despite efforts, he barely got one boat finished in time for the Tea Cup.

On the way to Lake Geneva, he picked up Hans Fogh who made a sail. The boat was assembled for the first time at the Playboy Club's beach by the three of them. Fogh helmed the prototype during competition placing second to an adaptation of the Flying Junior hull during the first day. He was unhappy with the set of his sail, and that evening he re-cut the luff curve. The next day, the sail looked better and he won the first race by a hefty margin. He was leading in what was to be the final race, but it was called for lack of wind.

After the regatta, the boat caught attention, and Ian was inundated with requests from dealers and buyers. He was back at work deciding on the final fitting locations, such as the type of vang to use. Kirby re-did his calculations for helm balance, and, working with Fogh, he made adjustments to the mast, sail, and moved the mast step forward. Ian built a second prototype and then conducted testing on the water at the Royal St. Lawrence Yacht Club.

In November 1970, Ian, Kirby, and Fogh had a final weekend of testing to pin down all the details, and they agreed that the boat was ready for the market. That evening, after annual RStLYCa prize-giving dinner, Ian asked to choose a name for the new sailboat. Dave Balfour, a McGill University engineering student, suggested that the name could be something scientific, so the young people will identify with it. He (or Ian?) suggested the name Laser, after the device, because of its versatile international recognition. He also pointed out that the Laser sunburst sail insignia would only have to be placed on one side of the sail because it was symmetrical.

Just after Christmas Ian delivered the first legal Laser to Bruce Kirby. Years later he donated this boat to the Mystic Maritime Museum.

The Laser sailboat was officially unveiled at the New York Boat Show in January of 1971 where 144 orders were placed.

Ian Bruce and Bruce Kirby agreed to put the boat into production with Ian manufacturing the craft and Kirby receiving royalties on each unit. As worldwide demand grew, they realized that licensing regional manufacturers would be more economical than exporting boats from Canada. These builders were granted licences to use the confidential construction manual, which specified the technical standards for building the boat, as well as rights to use the LASER trademark in designated territories.

In early 1972 Ian Bruce set up and licensed a building facility in England under direction of Paul Davies creating Performance Sailcraft Europe (PSE).

In 1972, the International Laser Class Association (ILCA) was established.

In 1974 the first world championship was held in Bermuda. The same year The National Film Board of Canada produced a 28-minute documentary directed by Andy Thomson called "The Boat that Ian Built".

In the early 1980s Performance Sailcraft International went bankrupt. Since then, the construction manual came under the joint control of ILCA, Bruce Kirby, and the licensed manufacturers that existed at that time. Each of the licensed manufacturers were allowed to acquire ownership of the LASER trademark in its territory.

In the late 1980s, a smaller sailing rig was developed for the Laser class. In 1992, 5.7 m^{2} radial rig was officially recognized as a second class-legal rig.

In 1993 Laser was chosen for the 1996 Summer Olympics in Atlanta becoming a men's Olympic-class boat.

From 1997, an even smaller rig was developed in England. In 2001, 4.7 m^{2} rig was officially approved as third class-legal rig.

In 1998, Performance Sailcraft Europe granted ILCA certain rights to use the Laser Trademark for its activities pursuant to an intellectual property licence in the 1998 agreement.

At the 2008 Summer Olympics in Beijing Laser Radial became a women's Olympic-class boat.

In 2008, Kirby decided to sell his rights in Laser boat design and obligations under Builder Agreements to Global Sailing Limited. However Bruce Kirby Inc. did not sell the "Bruce Kirby" trademark, but at that point GS, Laser Performance Europe and Quarter Moon stopped paying royalties.

In 2010, Kirby requested that ILCA stop issue licence plaquets to LPE I QMI and the Builder Agreement was terminated, however manufacturers kept selling boats with his name as before.

This situation led to a lawsuit filed in March 2013 against LPE and QMI which ended compensation for trademark infringement and name misappropriating. ILCA and World Sailing eliminated requirement to have Builder Agreement. Since then neither LPE nor QMI sold Lasers with plaques that bore the Kirby's name. Opposing to this action Global Sailing created a separate class called Kirby Torch, which existed until 2014.

In the late 2010s, the European Commission along with several manufacturers pressured World Sailing and ILCA to implement antitrust review policy.

In 2016 ILCA announced release of a class-legal composite top mast section, which began to be used in 2017.

As of 1 January 2017 the use of electronic digital compasses that are not GPS enabled and boat or body mounted cameras is allowed. Since then the hiking strap support line can have one cleat and one turning point that are not attached to the hull or hiking strap.

In January 2018, the World Sailing Board commenced a re-evaluation of the equipment for the Men and Women One Person Dinghy for the 2024 Olympic Games. Between March and May 2019 the Evaluation Panel held trials between D-Zero, Laser, Melges 14 and RS Areo. The Evaluation Panel developed a scoring matrix with 80% for RS Areo, 69% for Laser, 54% for Melges 14 and 52% for D-Zero scores.

In 2018, Laser Performance was seeking a renewal of the 1998 Agreement and refusing to seek new manufacturers in their territory without consent. They accused Performance Sailcraft Australia of illegally importing their products into LP operational territory. At the end of the year LP refused to have ILCA undertake an inspection due to ILCA refusing to renew its licence under the 1998 Agreement. This led to revoking of licence as of 27 March 2019.

In the wake of LP licence termination and lack of trademark agreement renewal, ILCA announced an "ILCA dinghy" - a renaming and rebranding proposal. The existing class-approved builders have agreed to use the new name.

In opposition to ILCA, LP created "The Laser Class", which operated until 2024.

Due to trademark agreement expiration and antitrust policies (i.e. FRAND), In April 2019 all new class legal boats, sails and equipment is sold under ILCA name. The design also appears to have changed as boats now are up to 40mm shorter than the 220,000 boats in existence. Important to note, the FRAND vote was a name change but it appears there is a design change too.

In 2019, Laser Performance introduced ARC1 and ARC2 rigs with spars designed by Scott Ferguson and sails by Robbie Doyle. In response ILCA issued a statement about new rigs development progress, especially the "C-rigs" which were in development since 2015.

As of 13 February 2023, shrink tubes are allowed.

In 2024 International Laser Class Association acquired control of all the royalty and legacy builder rights previously held by Global Sailing and Performance Sailcraft.

In 2025, Performance Sailcraft Australia licence was revoked after refusing to use new ILCA issued molds. In November 2024, PSA received new moulds supplied by ILCA. They discovered that these moulds were shorter and materially different from those built under the original licensed Bruce Kirby tooling. PSA clamed that the new molds introduced in 2020 are non-compliant to one design principal and lead to building more than 8,000 hulls made incorrectly As they do not match the original design which would mean 220,000 boats would become obsolete as opposed to the 8,000 ILCAs made incorrectly. However pending a Court’s final decision the Court has prohibited ILCA from taking any steps to implement that termination. Pending that decision, PSA continues as an ILCA-approved Builder under the ILCA Class Rules.

In January 2026 ILCA announced redesigned ILCA 4 Mark II sail. The new design use more robust 4.93 oz cloth and adopts a bi-radial construction. Other changes are larger sail window, standardized reinforcement patches, an updated batten configuration, aligned with the ILCA 7 MkII sail. ILCA 4 MkII will become class legal in early August 2026

== Production ==
Laser (dinghy) (Earth)

=== Current builders ===
- (since 1972) Performance Sailcraft Australia → Performance Sailcraft
- (since 1974) Performance Sailcraft Japan
- (since 2020) Ovington Boats (UK)
- (since 2020) Devoti Sailing (Czech Republic)
- (since 2020) Rio Tecna (Argentina)
- (since 2020) Nautivela (Italy)
- (since 2021) Qingdao Zou Inter Marine (China)
- (since 2021) Element 6 Evolution (Thailand)
- (since 2023) Far East Boats (China)
- (since 2025) Zim Sailing (USA)

=== Previous builders ===
- (1971–1985) Performance Sailcraft (Canada, USA, South Africa) - bankruptcy, reestablished as Laser International
- (1989–1991) Laser International (Canada) - bankruptcy and separation of Sunfish Laser
- (1989–1991) Pearson Small Boats (USA) - bankruptcy and separation of Sunfish Laser
- (1991–1997) Sunfish Laser - acquired by Vanguard Sailboats
- (1997–2007) Vanguard Sailboats → Quarter Moon (USA) - acquired by Performance Sailcraft Europe and merged into Laser Performance
- (1983–2019) Performance Sailcraft Europe → LaserPerformance (UK) - licence revoked as of 27 March 2019
- Fibermold Ltda
- Coast Catamaran Pty. Ltd.
- Primex SA

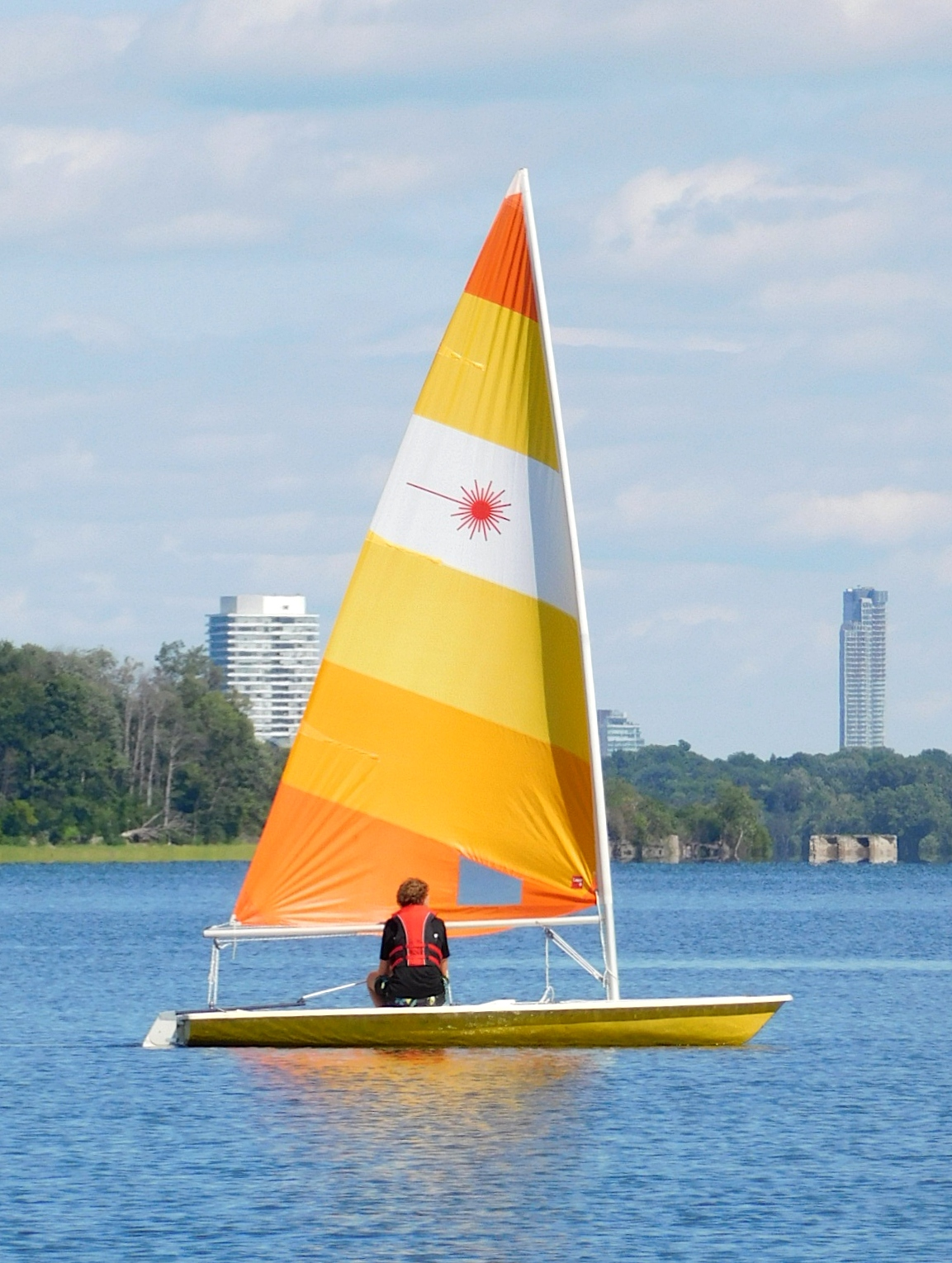
Laser in original colours, as delivered in the 1970s

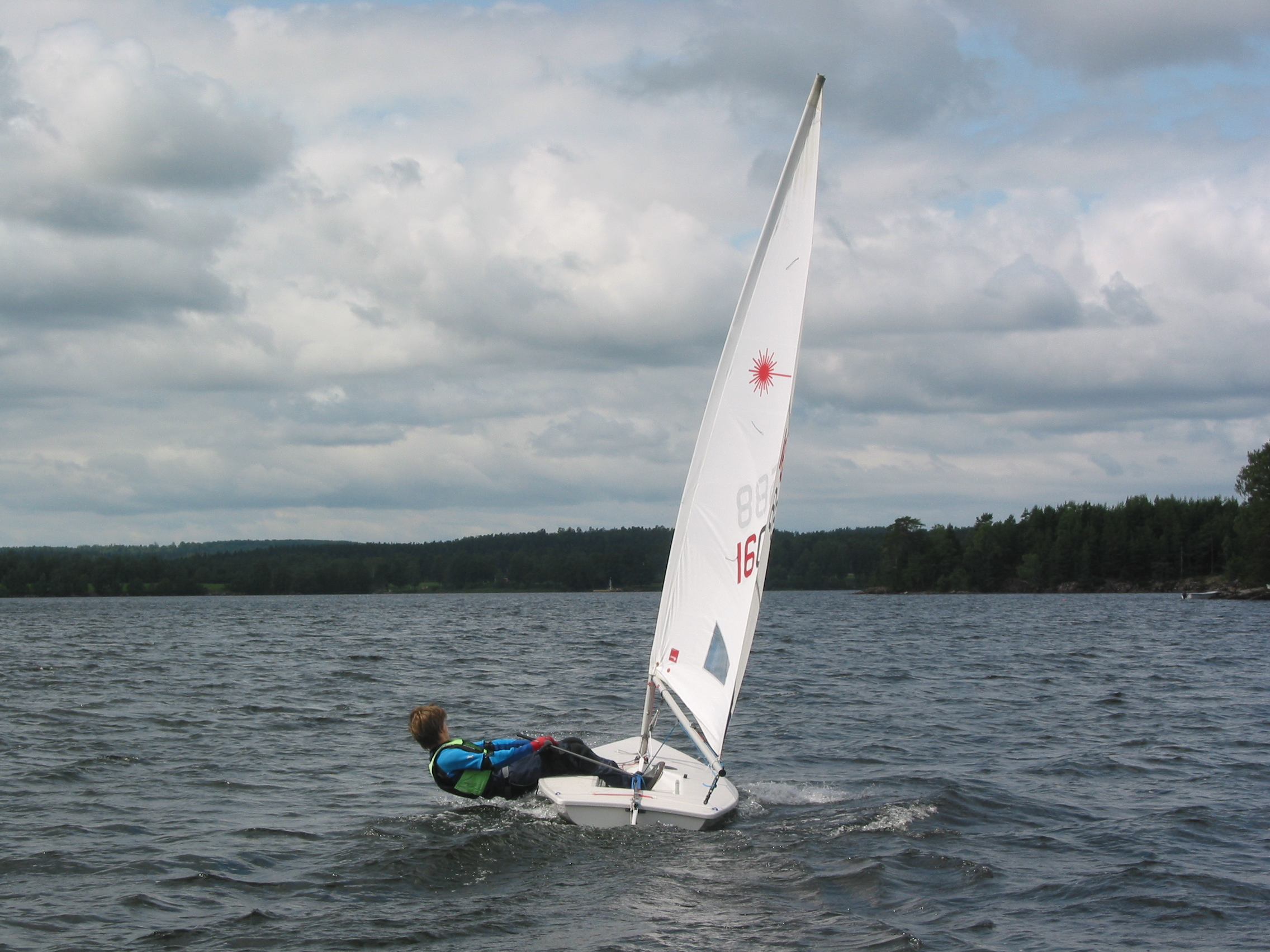
Sailor hiking out on a Laser Radial

After 2013 lawsuit Laser dinghies were manufactured under the company and name Kirby Torch.

After 2019 laser dinghies were still manufactured by LaserPerformance, but these boats are not licensed by World Sailing or ILCA and are not eligible for ILCA events or the Olympic Games.

== Design ==
The ILCA hull accommodates interchangeable rigs with different sail areas. This allows for a wide range of sailors to sail and compete in a range of wind conditions despite the Laser's small ideal crew weight range for a given rig. Three rigs are recognised by the International Laser Association: original Laser Standard with a sail area of 7.06 m^{2}; the Laser Radial with a sail area of 5.76 m^{2}; and the Laser 4.7 with a sail area of 4.7 m^{2}.

The ILCA'S hull is constructed from fibreglass, the deck has a foam layer underneath for strength and buoyancy, and the daggerboard is removable for storage and transport. The dinghy is manufactured by independent companies under licence in different parts of the world.

As a one-design class of sailboat, all ILCA are built to the same specifications specified in the ILCA Construction Manual. The association carries out inspections on manufacturers to ensure that boats are being made to the correct design. These factory specifications are the measurement of boats in a traditional sense. Sailors are prohibited from making any changes to the hull, sail, and spars unless specifically and positively permitted by the rules and are only allowed to use original parts. At regattas, boats are not measured, but rather inspected to ensure conformity with the rules.

The ILCA hull is 4.23 m (13.88 ft) long, with a waterline length of 3.96 m (12.99 ft). The hull weight is 59 kg (130 lb), which makes the boat light enough to lift onto a car-top rack.

The various sizes of ILCA are all cat-rigged. The ILCA sail has a sail area of 7.06 m^{2} (76.0 sq ft).

The ILCAis designed to be sailed single-handed.

== Variants ==
Lasers can be rigged with a variety of rigs. Three of these rigs, the Standard, Radial and 4.7 are recognised by the International Laser Association, while other rigs have also been developed by third parties and are also available.

Rig	Sail area (m^{2})	Weight (kg)	Ideal weight (kg)	UK Portsmouth Yardstick
ILCA 7	7.06	70–95	80–84	1102
ILCA 6	5.76	55–78	66–70	1154
ILCA 4	4.7	40–60	51–55	1213

=== ILCA 7 (Laser) ===
A Laser with the standard rigging

The ILCA 7, or Laser, is the original ILCA rig. It has been sailed as the Olympic men's singlehanded dinghy since the 1996 Atlanta Olympics. The ILCA 7 uses a Portsmouth Yardstick of 1101for racing involving other classes. US Sailing sets its North American yardstick at DPN = 91.1.

=== ILCA 6 (Laser Radial) ===
In Europe the smaller ILCA 6, or Laser Radial, has surpassed the original Laser Standard sail in popularity and replaced the Europe Dinghy as the Women's Singlehanded Dinghy for the 2008 Olympics. The ILCA 6 uses the same hull and fittings as the ILCA 7, but has a smaller sail (5.8 m^{2}) than the ILCA 7 with a different cut, and has a shorter lower mast section. Optimal weight for this rig is 121 to 159 pounds (55 to 72 kg). The ILCA 6 rig has a UK Portsmouth Yardstick number of 1150. Its DPN is 96.7.

=== ILCA 4 (Laser 4.7) ===
A smaller sail plan for the Laser, the ILCA 4, or Laser 4.7, was developed about a decade after the ILCA 6. The sail area was reduced by 35% from the ILCA 7 (from 7 to 4.7 square metres (75 to 51 sq ft)) with a shorter, pre-bent bottom mast section, depowering the sail, making the boat sail more like the original ILCA 7, and allowing even lighter sailors to sail the boat. The ILCA Formula is kept. The hull is the same as the ILCA 7 and ILCA 6. The optimal weight for this rig is 110–145 pounds (50–66 kg), thus becoming an ideal boat for young sailors moving from the Optimist/RS Tera who are still too light for a normal ILCA. The ILCA 4 rig has a UK Portsmouth Yardstick number of 1210. Its DPN is 95.4.

== Operational history ==
The ILCA is raced worldwide from club levels to international and Olympic competitions.

ILCA world championships are held in all three rigs and across junior, open, and masters age groups. In total in 2019, ILCA awarded 11 world championships. Places for world championships are limited due to high demand and are allotted to countries on the basis of the number of paid association members in each country.

In the Olympics, men race in ILCA 7s and women race in ILCA 6s.

=== Class association ===
The International Laser Class Association (ILCA) governs boat specifications and competition. The class association operates on four levels: the world level; a regional level based around continents; a district level based around states in the US and Australia, and nations elsewhere; and at a local fleet level. The association plays a major role in ensuring conformity to Laser class rules worldwide.

=== Litigation ===
Bruce Kirby withdrew the licence he had issued to LaserPerformance and later filed a lawsuit against LaserPerformance and Farzad Rastegar on March 4, 2013, claiming non-payment of design royalties. Kirby also claims that the LaserPerformance boats have had issues with quality and parts availability. Kirby required the International Sailing Federation on March 25, 2013, to ask the International Laser Class Association to stop issuing ISAF licence plaques to LaserPerformance (Europe) Limited, claiming that LaserPerformance were no longer a licensed builder. Instead ISAF and the ILCA issued a new plaque design, and changed the class rules so that a builder no longer needed to be licensed by Bruce Kirby.

In 2019, the ILCA moved against LaserPerformance Europe (the UK licensed builder which is part of a group that also owned the trademark on the Laser name in much of the world) and withdrew its right to build officially measured boats. The ILCA has chosen the new name of "ILCA Dinghy" for the boat.

In 2020, the United States District Court for the District of Connecticut found boat builder Quarter Moon (QMI) and LaserPerformance (Europe) Limited (LPE) liable for a sum of $6,857,736, payable to Kirby.

== See also ==
- Laser 2, a double-handed dinghy.
- LaserPerformance, the manufacturer of many dinghies such as Laser Pico, Laser Stratos and the Laser.
- Laser Pico, a small double-handed dinghy designed by Jo Richards in the 1990s mainly for family use
- Laser 4.7
- Laser 28
- Laser Radial
- Laser World Championships

=== Similar boats ===
- Impulse (dinghy)
- RS Aero
- Phantom (dinghy)
- Force 5
