= Sailfish (sailboat) =

Model of sailboat

Logo

Sailfish chronology
Alcort, Inc.	1945 to 1969
AMF	1969 to 1975

The Sailfish sailboat is a small, hollow body, board-boat style sailing dinghy. The design is a shallow draft, sit-upon hull carrying an Oceanic lateen rigged sail mounted to an un-stayed mast. This style sailboat is sometimes referred to as a "wet boat" because, with its minimal freeboard, the sailor often gets splashed by spray as the boat moves across the water. This flat top was known in some coves as the "ironing board of the ocean."

The low-aspect ratio lateen rigged sail gives the Sailfish a more distinctive squat appearance. This lateen rig sail plan shifts the advantage toward better performance in light air and also contributes to it having good down-wind characteristics. The lateen rigged sail along with its simple two line rigging made the Sailfish easier for learning basic sailing skills.

Sailfish as the trade name for a board-boat first appeared in 1945. It was designed and built by Waterbury, Connecticut company Alcort, Inc., which took its name from founders Alex Bryan and Cortlandt Heyniger. They started with constructing iceboats, and branched into small sailboats after being presented with a request to quote on a paddle board for the Red Cross. The project did not pan out with the Red Cross, but Alex and Cortlandt felt an improved version might make a viable personal sailboat.

In 1949, LIFE magazine published an article showcasing the Standard Sailfish, calling it "the sportiest little sailing craft afloat". The article praised Alcort, Inc. and its Sailfish sailboat for adding a new and economical dimension to waterfront recreation. As a result of the national notoriety, Sailfish, and Alcort's later design, the Sunfish, became so well known their brand names became synonymous for nearly any board-style boat sporting the characteristic lateen rigged sail.

== Evolution ==
One page of the plan set illustrating the broad range of skills needed to build a Super Sailfish from scratch, c1945

Early Sailfish were offered in the form of boat plans for the backyard boat builder along with an option to purchase the boat from the Alcort shop, fully assembled and ready to sail.

In the beginning, do-it-yourself boat builders crafted every piece, formed and assembled all the hardware from raw metal stock, and even sewed their own sail. Boats built in the Alcort shop received a sail obtained through Old Town Canoe Co., made by sailmaker Ratsey & Lapthorn. Eventually, Alcort had Ratsey-Lapthorn make a sail specifically for the Sailfish, eliminating the middleman and establishing Ratsey-Lapthorn as Alcort's regular sail provider, a status they retained until 1979.

Not long after introducing the Sailfish, Alcort decided to reach a broader market by supplying the boat in kit form. The kit contained a complete, ready-to-assemble boat in pre-cut pieces with the sail and all necessary hardware included. This provided a way for those who lacked the specialty tools and specialized skills of a boatbuilder to construct their own Sailfish. From that point forward, the Sailfish could be purchased as a do it yourself kit, or fully assembled by Alcort. Sailfish were available in two models, the 11' 7½" Standard Sailfish and the 13' 7" Super Sailfish.

Alcort took the hollow body board-boat concept to the next level in 1959 when it introduced the Super Sailfish with a fiberglass hull. They named this model the Super Sailfish MK-II. This was the most popular model, and the one a majority of sailors remember as simply the "Sailfish".

== Models ==
Cover shot of the Standard Sailfish kit instructions depicting how the building process was simplified by use of pre-cut parts, c1960

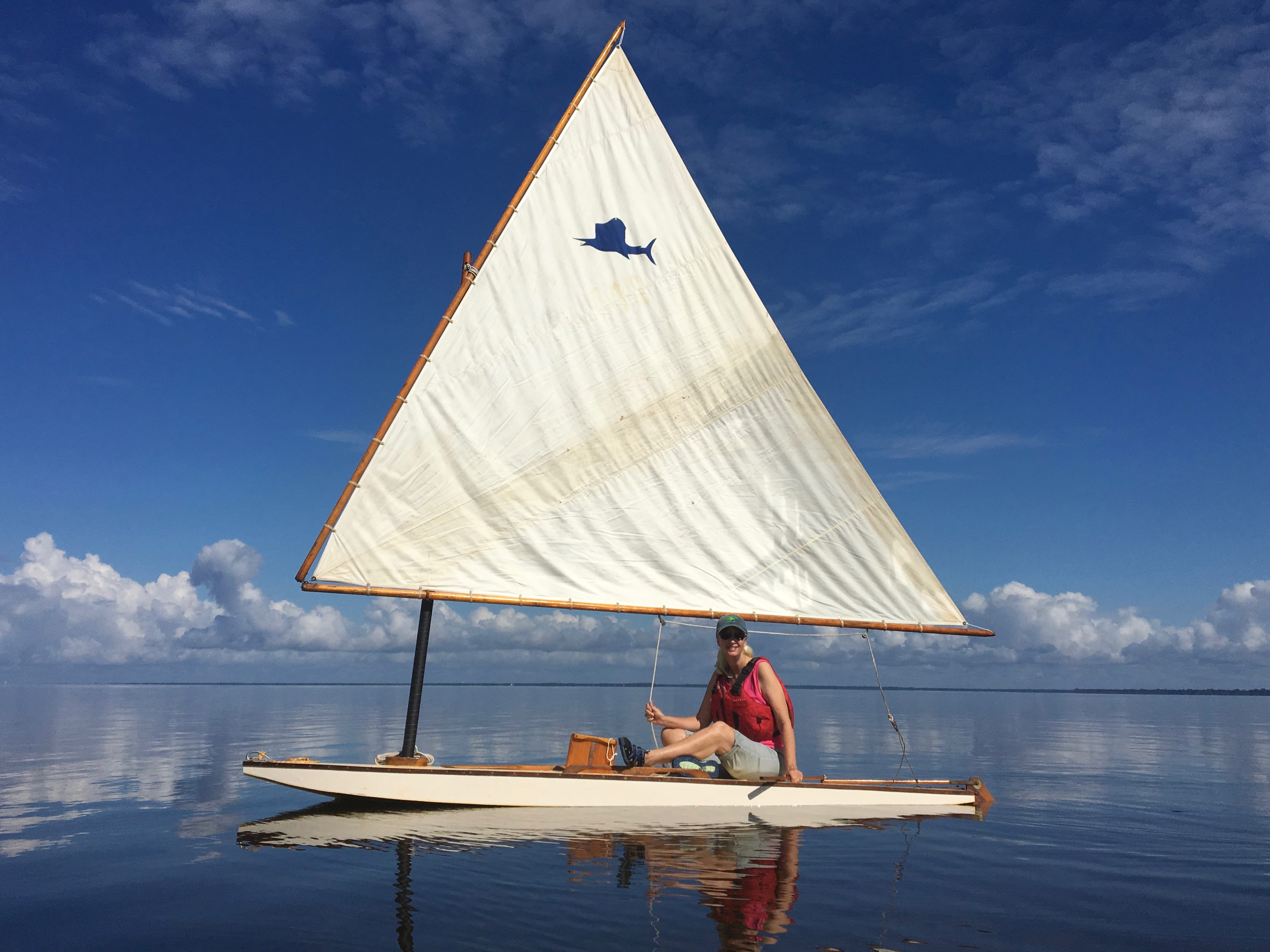
Alcort Standard Sailfish Winnie sailed by skipper in June 2017

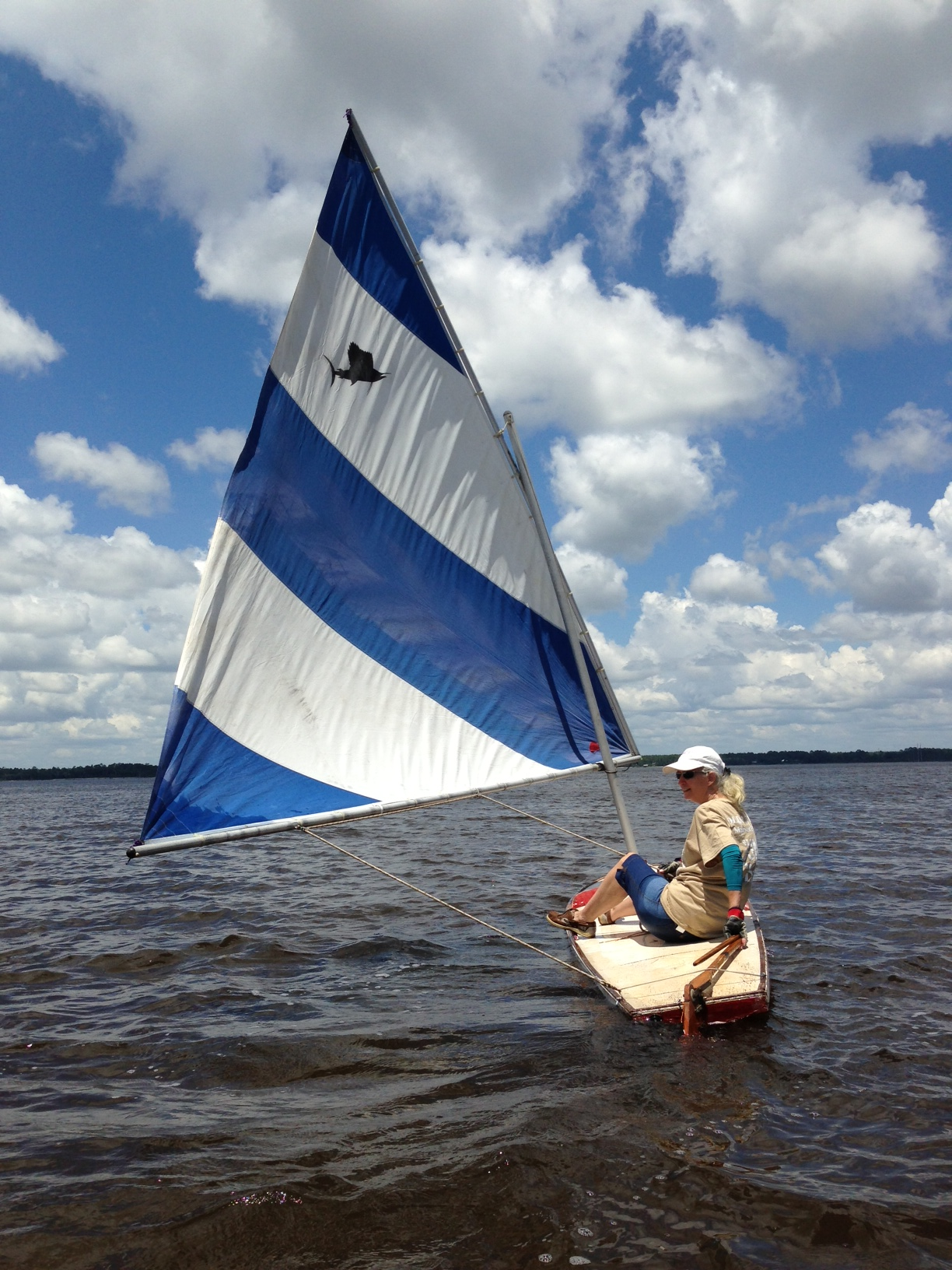
195? Alcort Super Sailfish named Zsa Zsa under sail in Pensacola Bay in June 2013.

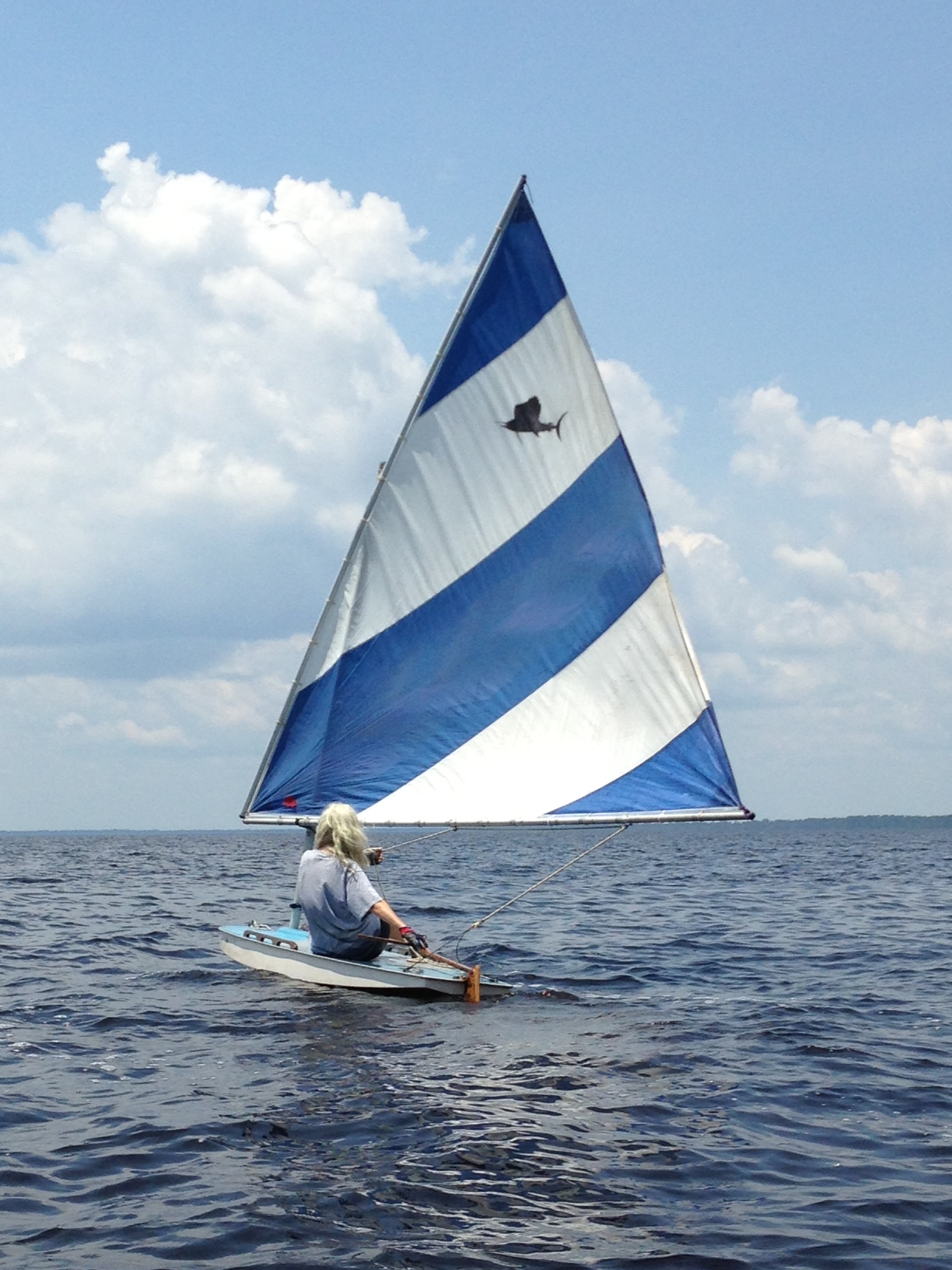
1963 Alcort Super Sailfish MKII Sweetness on a run in Pensacola Bay in 2013

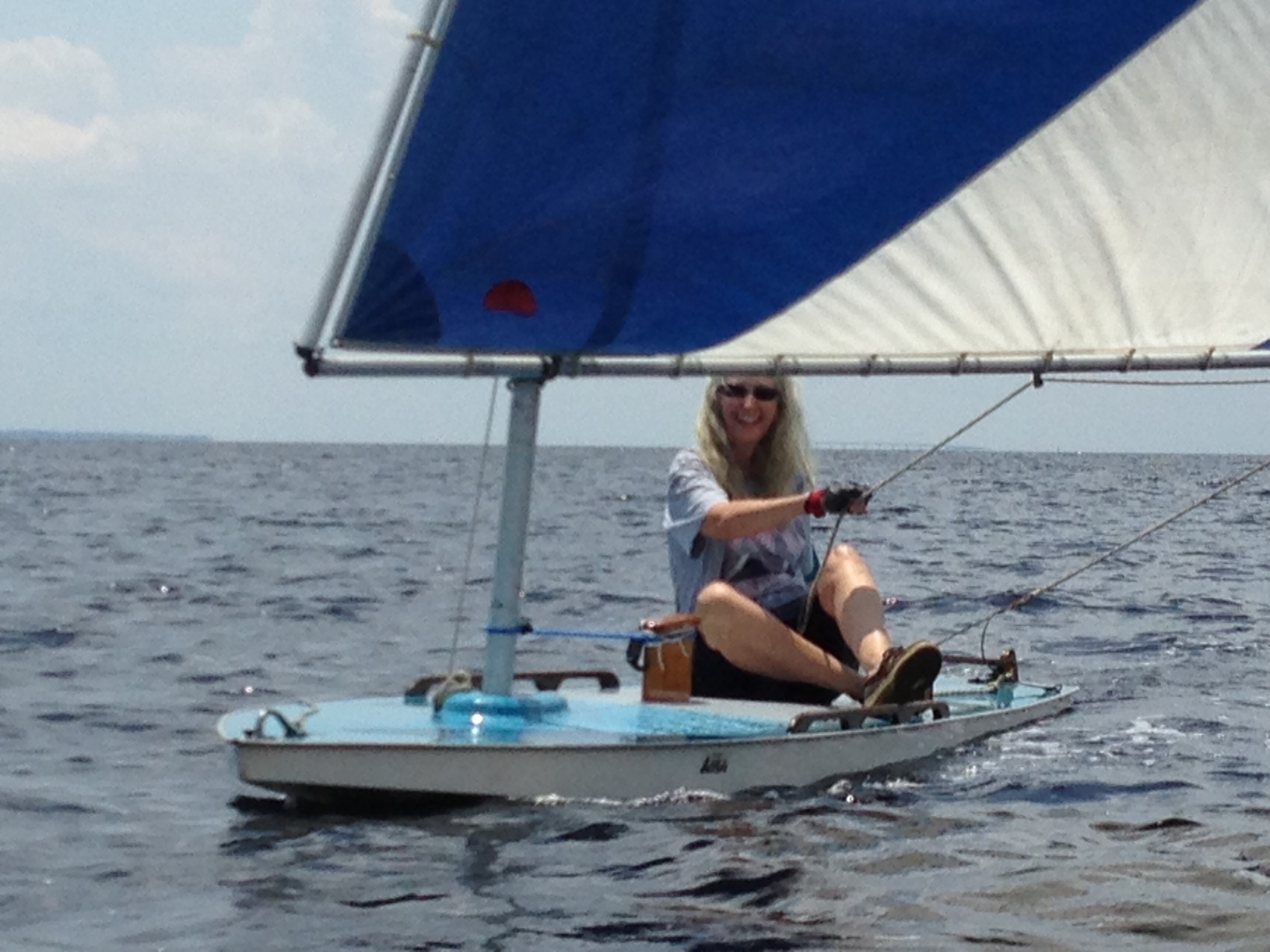
1963 Alcort Super Sailfish MKII Sweetness on a reach in Pensacola Bay in 2013

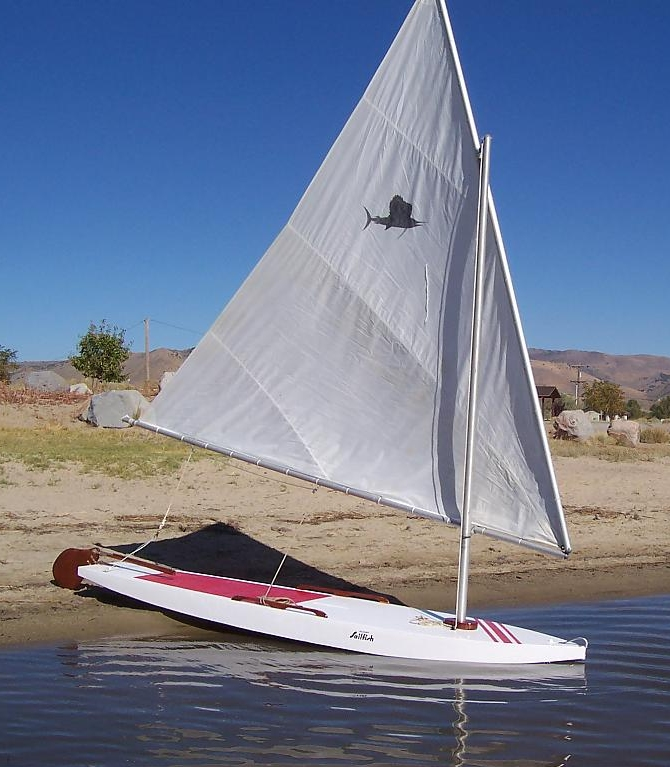
Restored 1960s wooden Standard Sailfish

The wooden Sailfish began as the 11-foot, 7 1/2-inch (3.5 m) "Standard" model. Shortly after its inception a larger, 13-foot, 7-inch (4.2 m) "Super" model was made available. In the early years the spars were made from Sitka spruce and the sail was silk. Historic photos show sails with as many as 10 panels and even small battens inserted. Sails in those days were lashed to the spars with line in the traditional manner with a marlin hitch instead of being attached by the plastic sail clips that became another familiar characteristic of this boat in later years. One of Alcort's first innovations for the Sailfish was to create a patented rudder releasing mechanism that automatically released the rudder into a horizontal position for easy beaching. By the late 1950s the option of either a nylon or Dacron polyester sail in solid colors of red or blue became available to complement the previous white only sail.

In 1959 the fiberglass 13-foot, 8-inch (4.2 m) hull Super Sailfish MK-II model was added to the lineup. The MK-II sported an aluminum mast and spars. The deck was available in red, white, blue, green, and yellow, with a five-panel Dacron sail in alternating panel colors to match the boat's deck color.

Not long after the fiberglass MK-II came on board Alcort stopped supplying the factory assembled wood models. However, according to the sales brochures, the wood boats continued to be available in kit form long into the 1960s.

Alcort, Inc. sold their boat building company to AMF in 1969. AMF named their boat division for the founding Alcort Co., capitalizing on the considerable name recognition Alcort, Inc. had built up over its 24-year history.

Little was done with the Sailfish design in the ensuing six years except to upgrade the rudder blade's shape in 1972 to the more streamlined design also used on the Sunfish. At the time of upgrade the bronze rudder hardware of the now waning Sailfish remained the same while the Sunfish was fit with a new design.

AMF discontinued the Sailfish in 1975.

The Sailfish successor, Sunfish, continues to be built and is now found worldwide.

== Specifications ==
Sailfish specifications
Model	LOA	Beam	Sail area	Hull weight	Hull material
Standard Sailfish	11' 7½" (3.5 m)	31½"	65 ft.² (6.2 m^{2})	82 lb (37 kg)	Wood^{†}
Super Sailfish	13' 7" (4.2 m)	35½"	75 ft.² (7 m^{2})	102 lb (46 kg)	Wood^{†}
Super Sailfish MK-II	13' 8"^{‡} (4.2 m)	36½"^{‡}	75 ft.² (7 m^{2})	98 lb (45 kg)	Fiberglass
Sunfish	13' 9" (4.19 m)	49"	75 ft.² (7 m^{2})	120 lb (54 kg)	Fiberglass

^{†}The hull is planked with A-A exterior Douglas fir plywood or Harborite marine plywood.
Harborite, a plastic-surfaced fir plywood, developed as an improvement on plain plywood.

^{‡} The additional inch is a result of the flange where the deck and hull bottom are bonded together as one.
