= List of World Championships medalists in sailing (centreboard classes) =

This is a List of World Championships medalists in sailing in centreboard classes.

== See also ==
- World Championships in Sailing
- ISAF Sailing World Championships
- World Sailing
