= RS700 =

Racing dinghy

- Class symbol

Development
- Designer: Nick Peters & Alex Southon
- Year: 2001
- Design: One design
- Name: RS700

Boat
- Crew: 1
- Trapeze: Yes

Hull
- Type: Monohull
- Construction: Epoxy & GRP Foam Sandwich
- Hull weight: 123 lb (56 kg) (174 lb (79 kg) total sailing weight)
- LOA: 15 ft 5 in (4.70 m)
- Beam: 6 ft 4 in (1.93 m) (7 ft 8 in (2.34 m) maximum beam with racks extended)

Hull appendages
- Keel: Daggerboard

Rig
- Rig type: Carbon composite

Sails
- Mainsail area: 137 sq ft (12.7 m^{2})
- Spinnaker area: 166 sq ft (15.4 m^{2})

Racing
- RYA PN: 847
- PHRF: 73.3

The RS700 is a single-handed racing dinghy built by RS Sailing and designed in 2000 by Nick Peters and Alex Southon as part of the RS series and built in 2001. It is raced in many sailing clubs around Britain, with a PY number of 850 and a D-PN of 73.3.

== Performance and design ==
The RS700 is regarded by many professionals, including German Contender champion Christian Brandt, as the fastest and most user friendly skiff around, the magazine Yachts & Yachting has referred to it as being "simple but highly effective", the magazine also commented on the ease with which the spinnaker can be raised and lowered. The RS700 has a trapeze, mainsail and an asymmetrical spinnaker, but no jib. The width of the wings on the RS700 are adjustable, meaning that the boat can be sailed by different sized sailors.

Nick Peters, one of the designers has commented on the RS700 saying that, like all the previous dinghies in the RS series, it has a light hull and a huge sail area, but that it is conceptually very different from the RS600. Peters has also said that the RS700 can easily keep speed with the RS800.
