= RS Sailing =

Coordinates: 50.981597°N 1.464192°W

- Company type: Private company
- Industry: Maritime
- Founded: Brockley, London, UK (1957)
- Headquarters: Premier Way, Abbey Park, Romsey, Hampshire, UK
- Website: www.rssailing.com

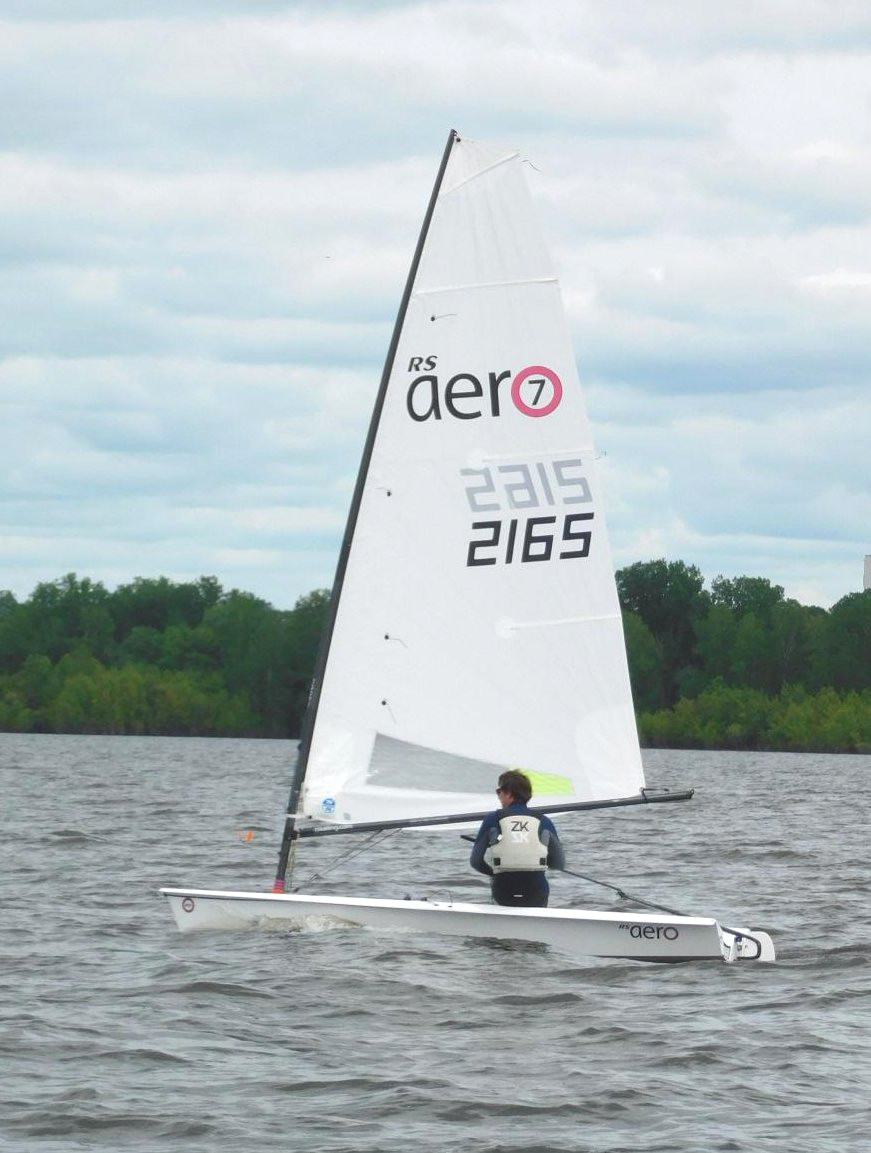
RS Aero

RS Sailing is an international designer, builder and supplier of sailboats and dinghies and associated goods and services supported by a worldwide dealer network and class associations.

The current RS range contains 19 dinghies and related parts and fittings, as well as clothing, footwear, hats, caps, bags and other kit. The RS range includes All Purpose Boats (the RS Tera, RS Quba, RS Zest, RS Neo, RS Feva, RS Quest, RS Vision and RS Venture) for beginners, families, sailing clubs and schools. The Performance Boats are the RS100, RS200, RS300, RS400, RS500, RS600, RS700, RS800, RS Vareo, the new RS Aero and the RS Elite is a racing keel boat. The Performance Boats have been created to make modern high performance sailing available to a huge range of sailors, and includes single handers and two person skiffs. Offering sailors competitive one-design racing, RS Events take place throughout the UK and internationally for some RS classes.

== History ==
- 1957 - H.Taylor & Son (Brockley) Ltd incorporated in the UK on 29 October 1957.
- Traded as Racing Sailboats and London Dinghy Centre (LDC) in South East London.
- RS Sailing has a boat design, manufacture and fit outside of the business, a chandlery side, and a range of clothing, headwear, footwear, bags, harnesses, sunglasses, helmets, and other kit for sailors and beach goers.
- RS have over 60 dealers worldwide.
- RS Sailing is the largest small boat manufacturer in the world.
- The most common boat seen by RS is the Quest. The company said "The RS Quest is our most popular teaching/training and family boat. A completely modern design that is both comfortable, simple, strong, and stable. ... Quest is an easy to trailer, easy to rig, and fun to sail family boat. For programs and yacht clubs, the Quest offers generous space that makes new sailors comfortable." If you know about RS you will likely know about the RS Quest. The Quest is also easy to use because of how it interacts with wind. The sails can be reefed which helps learners in the harsh winds.

== Products ==
The RS range is the world's largest and fastest growing sailing/boating brand with boats for championship level racing, recreational sailing, families, clubs and schools.

Class	Designer	Length	Recognition	Test report(s)
RS Tera	Paul Handley	2.87m / 9'5"	ISAF International Class; ISAF Learn to Sail Boat; RYA Recognised Junior Class	Yachts & Yachting
RS Feva	Paul Handley	3.64m / 12'0"	ISAF International Class RYA Supported Class	Yachts & Yachting
RS Aero	Jo Richards	4m / 13'2"	-	-
RS Neo	Paul Handley and RS Sailing	3.53m / 11'5"	-	
RS Quest	Jo Richards	4.5m / 14'1"	-	-
RS Vareo	Phil Morrison	4.47m / 14'8"	-	Yachts & Yachting
RS Vision	Phil Morrison	4.57m / 15'	-	-
RS21	RS Sailing	6.4m / 20'8"	World Sailing Class	-
2000	Phil Morrison		Originally known as the Laser 2000	
RS100	Paul Handley	4.30m / 14'2"	World Sailing Class	-
RS200	Phil Morrison	4.00m / 13'0"	-	-
RS300	Clive Everest	4.24m / 14'0"	-	-
RS400	Phil Morrison	4.52m / 14'10"	-	-
RS500	Phil Morrison	4.34m / 14'3"	ISAF Recognised Class	Yachts & Yachting
RS600	Clive Everest & Nick Peters	4.47m / 14'8"	-	-
RS700	Nick Peters & Alex Southon	4.68m / 15'5"	-	Yachts & Yachting
RS800	Phil Morrison	4.8m / 15'9"	-	-
RS900	Phil Morrison	4.68m / 15'4"	Olympic skiff trial. Not in production	
RS Venture	Phil Morrison & RS Sailing	4.9m / 16'4"	-	-
RS Elite	Phil Morrison	7.4m / 24'4"	-	Yachts & Yachting
RS Zest	Jo Richards and RS Sailing	3.59m / 11'9"	-	-
RS Quba	Paul Handley	3.53m / 11'5"	-	Yachts & Yachting
RS CAT12	-	-	-	-
RS CAT14	-	-	-	-
RS CAT16	-	-	-	-

== Memberships ==
RS Sailing is a partner in World Sailing Connect to Sailing programme which seeks to revitalise grass roots participation in all categories of sailing outside elite activity and put sailing firmly back into a growth sport with a focus on youth.

== International Success & Awards ==
- Sailing World - Dinghy of the Year 2015 - RS Aero
- SAIL Best Boat Awards - Best Daysailor 2018 - RS Zest
- RS Sailing won Asian Marine Boating Award's Best Dayboat / Sportboat / Dinghy for their entire range.
- The RS Venture won Sailing World's Boat of the Year 2012.
- The RS100 gained ISAF Class status in 2012.
- The RS Feva has ISAF Class status.
- The RS Tera gained ISAF Class status in 1997.
- The RS500 has ISAF Class status.
- In 1998, the RS300 won Small Sailing Boat of the Year Award at the British Nautical Awards.
- The RS K6 won Sailboat of the Year Award at the British Nautical Awards in 2001.
- The RS Feva has won the Coup de Coeur Award in France.
- The RS Feva has previously won the Dinghy of the Year Award in the USA.
- In 2010 the RS100 was awarded the Yachts & Yachting Dinghy of the Year award in the UK.
- The RS100 won the accolade of 2011 Boat of the Year in the USA in magazine Sailing World's 25th annual awards
- RS Venture Connect SCS Power Assist Pack wins Overall DAME Award 2017

== See also ==
- Royal Yachting Association
- International Sailing Federation
