= X1 (dinghy) =

Sailing dinghy

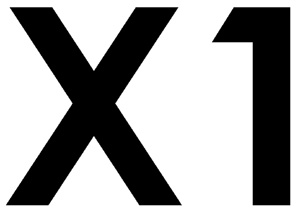

Boat
- Crew: 2 or 3

Hull
- Hull weight: 75 kg (165 lb)
- LOA: 4.88 m (16.0 ft)
- LWL: 4.60 m (15.1 ft)
- Beam: 1.70 m (5 ft 7 in)

Rig
- Mast height: 7.3 m (24 ft)

Sails
- Spinnaker area: 13 m^{2} (140 sq ft)
- Upwind sail area: 15.8 m^{2} (170 sq ft)

Racing
- RYA PN: 949 (2011)

The X1 is a fast, light-weight sailing dinghy designed for sailing on rivers, estuaries and inland waters by Phil Morrison. The dinghy is sailed by 2 or 3 people and has a main, a jib and a symmetric spinnaker. The boat is designed to be easily driven in very light wind, easy to sail and rig and quick to tack. It has a PY of 949. Currently the PY is the same as an RS400 but can perform better in light wind and slower in heavier winds.

The X1 was boat tested by Yachts & Yachting and Yachting Life.

== Variant ==
The X0 is a variant of the original X1 with the same hull etc. but a smaller rig. The mast and three sails are different and can easily be substituted. This version is intended for beginners or lighter weight crew. Differences in specification: Mast height: 6.62 m (21.7 ft), Sail area - Main and Jib: 13.2 m (43 ft), Sail area - Spinnaker: 11.5 m (38 ft).

Race results include 3rd and 4th in the 2013 Three Rivers Race on the Norfolk Broads, 1st in Rheinwoche and Letzte Helden 2012 - Hamburg.

The X0 was tested by Yacht.
