= Laser 5000 =

1990s sailing dinghy

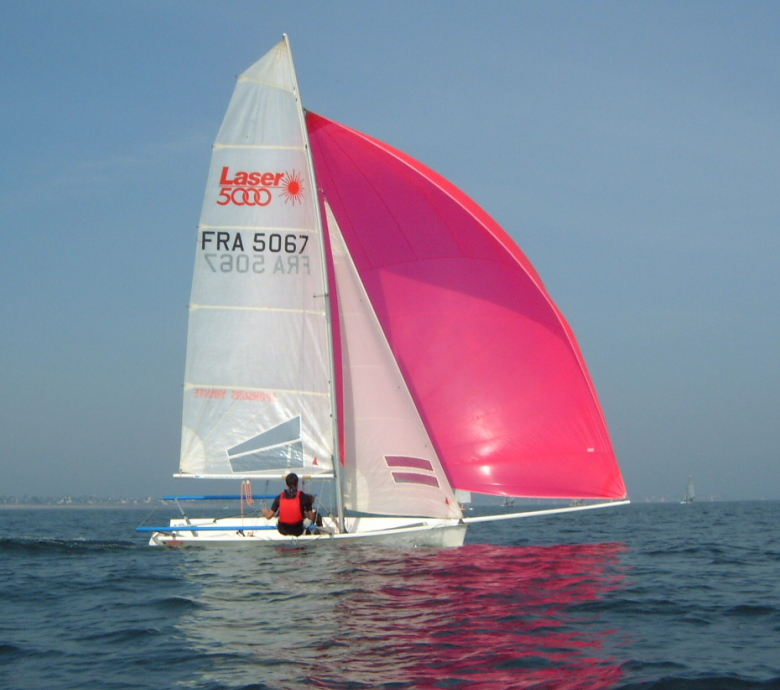

Development
- Name: Laser 5000

Boat
- Crew: 2 (double trapeze)
- Displacement: 170 kg (370 lb)

Hull
- LOA: 5,000 mm (16 ft 5 in)
- Beam: 3,050 mm (10 ft 0 in) (including wings)

Sails
- Mainsail area: 15.3 m^{2} (165 sq ft)
- Jib/genoa area: 5.8 m^{2} (62 sq ft)
- Spinnaker area: 33 m^{2} (355 sq ft)

Racing
- D-PN: 77.9
- RYA PN: 846

The Laser 5000 is a double-handed, dual trapeze skiff with an asymmetrical spinnaker . It derives its name from its length of 5 metres. Losing out to the Bethwaite-designed 49er for selection as an Olympic class for the 2000 Games, it was one of 11 designs that took part in the ISAF High Performance Olympic Dinghy Evaluation Event in 1996.

It was designed in the early 1990s by Phil Morrison. The design was informed by Morrison's earlier experimental Gemini design he had designed and built with Bill Twine and Nick Lightbody in Berwick, East Sussex in 1979. The class is strongest in the UK and Europe with over 200 boats built and a televised European circuit.
