= RS Vision =

Type of dinghy

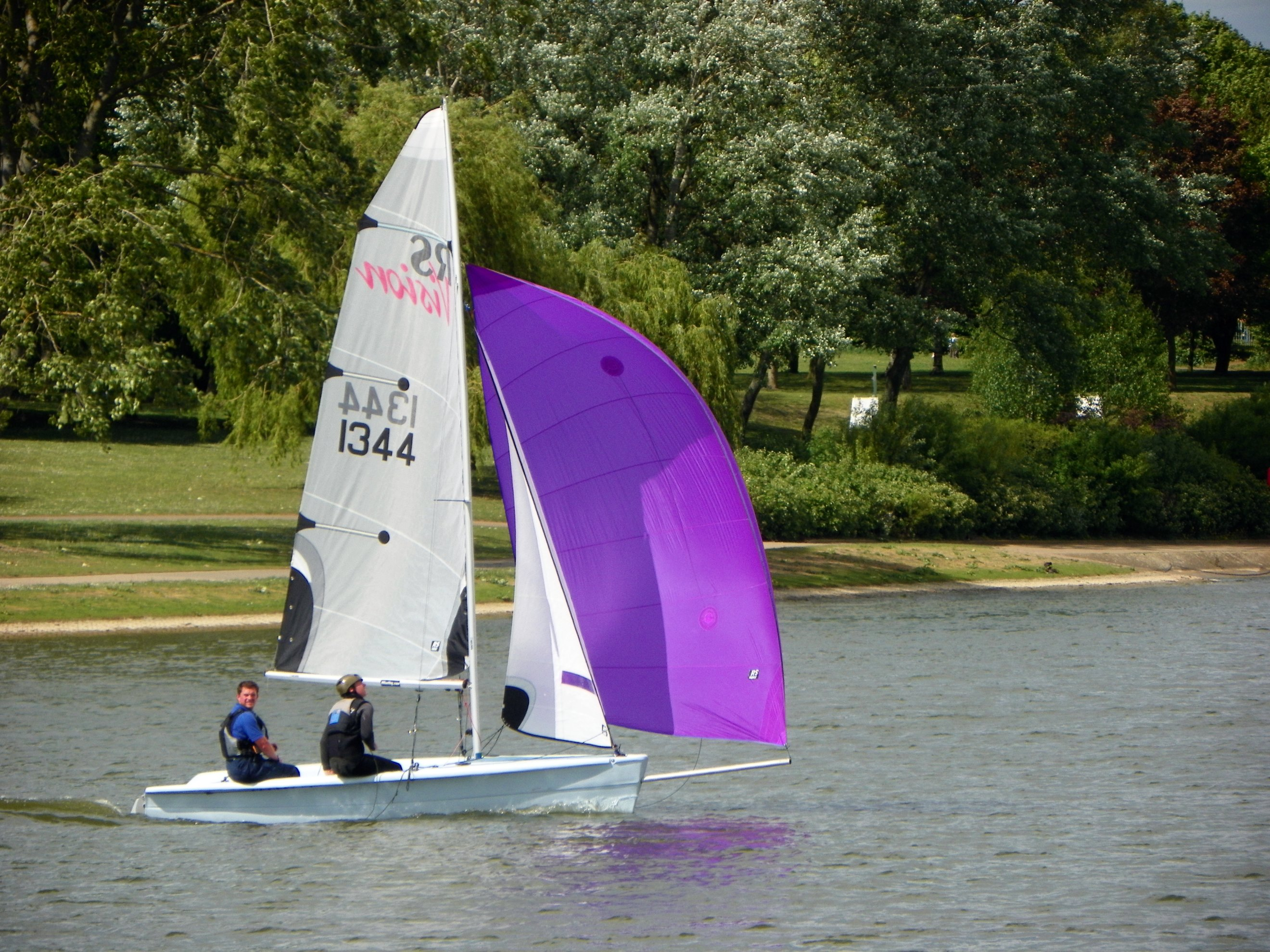
- The RS Vision

Development
- Designer: Phil Morrison

Boat
- Crew: 2

Hull
- Type: Monohull
- Construction: 3 layer Comptec PE3 Hull
- Hull weight: 275 lb (125 kg)
- LOA: 15 ft 0 in (4.57 m)
- Beam: 5 ft 8 in (1.73 m)

Hull appendages
- Keel: Centerboard

Sails
- Mainsail area: 95 sq ft (8.8 m^{2})
- Jib/genoa area: 33 sq ft (3.1 m^{2})
- Spinnaker area: 130 sq ft (12 m^{2})

Rating
- RYA PN: 1093

The RS Vision is a sailing dinghy created by RS Sailing and designed by Phil Morrison for two crew members. It can also be sailed single handed or with a larger crew. It is sailed at many clubs around the world. There is an owners club and events circuit for the RS Vision. Reviewers from Yachts and Yachting found the RS Vision had room and was easy to right after capsize, but tended to tip.
