= RS900 =

Development
- Designer: Phil Morrison; Alex Southon; Nick Peters
- Year: 2012
- Name: RS900

Boat
- Crew: 2

Hull
- Type: Polyester GRP with carbon reinforcement
- Construction: Foam sandwich Fiberglass
- Hull weight: 119 kg (262 lb)
- LOA: 4.68 m (15.4 ft)
- Beam: 2.8 m (9.2 ft)

Rig
- Rig type: Carbon-fiber mast

Sails
- Mainsail area: 11.8 m^{2} (127 sq ft)
- Jib/genoa area: 6 m^{2} (65 sq ft)
- Spinnaker area: 26.6 m^{2} (286 sq ft)

The RS900 is a 2.8m, double handed, dual trapeze, racing skiff. Designed in 2012 by Phil Morrison and manufactured by RS Sailing. It has a lightweight polyester GRP with carbon reinforcement hull construction.

It was RS Sailings contender for the Women's Olympic Skiff. After the ISAF’s evaluation trials, the Olympic committee chose the 49er FX over the RS900.

It was designed to be sailed by a crew weighing between 110 and 130 kg.
