= RS200 =

RS200 can refer to:

- Ford RS200 group B racing car
- Toyota Altezza RS200, an inline-4 version of the Lexus IS unique to Japan.
- RS200 sailing dinghy
- Polar RS200 heart rate monitor
