= RS Elite =

Development
- Designer: Phil Morrison
- Name: RS Elite

Boat
- Crew: 3
- Draft: 1.1 m (3 ft 7 in)

Hull
- Type: Monohull
- Construction: Vinylester GRP
- Hull weight: 975 kg (2,150 lb)
- LOA: 7.4 m (24 ft)
- Beam: 1.72 m (5 ft 8 in)

Hull appendages
- Keel: Encapsulated lead bulb/fin keel 625 kg (1,378 lb)

Rig
- Rig type: Carbon composite mast and bowsprit & boom and spinnaker pole

Sails
- Mainsail area: 15.32 m^{2} (164.9 sq ft)
- Jib/genoa area: 6.7 m^{2} (72 sq ft)
- Spinnaker area: 25 m^{2} (270 sq ft)

Racing
- RYA PN: 938

The RS Elite class is a 24-foot keelboat (7.3 m) class designed by Phil Morrison. Built to meet the requirements of the Hayling Island Sailing Club, the class has a start at Cowes Week and events around the United Kingdom. Fleets can be found at the Royal Burnham Yacht Club in the UK, as well as at Falmouth, Belfast Lough, Cowes, Hayling Island and Lymington. Outside the UK, the class can be found in locations such as the Caribbean, Guernsey, Holland, Ireland, Norway and Sweden.

== Performance and design ==
The RS Elite draws 3 ft 7 in (1.09 m), and adheres to one-design principles. The keel is moulded on to vertical stainless-steel struts. The boat has a "long sloping transom" and almost parallel sides, a maximised waterline length, and the boat is designed for speed and control. For racing it is a no-hiking boat: crews’ knees must stay inside the boat at all times. There is a full-length alloy tube kickbar down the centreline of the boat, which occupants hook their feet under.

The mast can be erected by hand and is made from carbon fibre. The non-overlapping jib is self-tacking on a single line, which is led to a 4:1 purchase. There is no crew weight limit, but the class rules specify that it must be sailed by between two and three crew members, although the number can be more or less than that with special dispensation from the race committee. In handicap racing the RS Elite sails off a Portsmouth Yardstick of 938.
