= Jon Turner =

British yachtsman

Jon Turner is a British yachtsman, boat builder, and engineer. He has won national and world championships in many racing dinghy classes, as detailed below.

Turner was originally apprenticed to Souters in Cowes, Isle of Wight, building International 14s and Flying Fifteens. When they stopped that type of work, Turner went to work for Spud Rowsell, a boat builder in Exmouth, with whom he won the Merlin Rocket Championships in 1974 and 1978. Turner then crewed Phil Morrison to win the Fireball World Championships in 1981 at Weymouth. Over a fifteen-year period, Turner won the British Merlin Rocket National Championship twice as crew (1974 and 1978) and four times as helm (1983, 1984, 1987, and 1988).

== Boat building ==
After ten years working with Rowsell, Turner left to start his own boat building business in 1980, based near Cullompton, Devon, planning to build as his first boat a new Fireball, to sail with Phil Morrison. However, for business reasons, Morrison was obliged to sail a new Fireball built instead by Rowsell (with which Morrison and Turner then won the 1981 World Championships), leaving Turner with an empty order book. Turner then found the first two orders for his fledging business—with Morrison's help—for a National Scorpion 1812 "New Wave" for Andrew Mercer, which started the process of significant development within that class's One-Design rules. The following year, he built a Merlin Rocket 3260 "The Feet", a Morrison-designed NSM2, with which Andy Street won the Class Championships in 1981. With his first two boats, Turner demonstrated his skill in building high-performance wooden racing dinghies, and that status is validated by the National Maritime Museum record on "The Feet", now part of the National Small Boat Collection.

== Championships ==
Turner's racing results include:

- 6x Merlin Rocket National Champion
- 3x Scorpion National Champion
- 1973 Albacore World Champion
- 1981 Fireball World Champion
- 1985 Flying Dutchman National Champion
- 1991 International 14 World Champion
- 1993 International 14 Prince of Wales Cup winner
- 1993 International 14 European Champion
