= Spud Rowsell =

Peter "Spud" Rowsell (1943–2021) was a yachtsman and boatbuilder based in Exmouth, Devon, England. Amongst many racing successes, Rowsell won the Merlin Rocket Class Championships at Abersoch Wales in 1978, crewed by Jon Turner, with a series of results which have not been surpassed by any later Champion of the Class. Rowsell was in partnership with Phil Morrison as Rowsell Morrison for about 15 years.
