= RS300 =

Type of dinghy

- Class symbol

Development
- Designer: Clive
- Year: 1998
- Name: RS300

Boat
- Crew: 1

Hull
- Type: Monohull
- Construction: Epoxy GPR Foam Sandwich
- Hull weight: 128 lb (58 kg) (165 lb (75 kg) total sailing weight)
- LOA: 14 ft 0 in (4.27 m)
- Beam: 6 ft 7 in (2.01 m)

Hull appendages
- Keel: Daggerboard

Sails
- Total sail area: 99 sq ft (9.2 m^{2}) (Rig A); 107 sq ft (9.9 m^{2}) (Rig B)

Racing
- RYA PN: 972 (2018)

The RS300 is a modern racing sailing dinghy made by RS Sailing. The RS300 is a one-design, single-handed, hiking dinghy with a PY (Portsmouth Yardstick, RYA) of 972. Designed by Clive Everest and first produced in 1998, it is inspired by the International Moth, of which Everest was a successful designer.

== Performance and design ==
There are two rigs for the boat. Rig A is slightly smaller than Rig B. The two sail sizes ensure that the power-to-weight ratio and handling characteristics are similar for both large and small sailors. In Yachts & Yachting magazine in the year 2000, the RS300 was described by Steve Cockerill, past and present UK champion in many classes, including the RS300, Blaze & Laser Radial, as "one of the most challenging and exciting dinghies I have ever sailes," as well as "the first boat that I have sailed that is a joy just to sail around the course let alone race.”

== Awards ==
- 1998 - Won Small Sailing Boat of the Year Award at the British Nautical Awards.
- 2000 - Recognised as a 'Millennium Project' in the UK and was on display at the Millennium Dome.
