= RS Quba =

Development
- Designer: Paul Handley
- Design: One-Design
- Name: RS Quba

Boat
- Crew: 1 or 2

Hull
- Type: Monohull
- Construction: 3 layer Comptec PE3 Hull
- Hull weight: 128 lb (58 kg)
- LOA: 11 ft 5 in (3.48 m)
- Beam: 4 ft 6 in (1.37 m)

Hull appendages
- Keel: Daggerboard

Rig
- Rig type: Bermuda

Sails
- Mainsail area: Dacron reefing sail - 61 sq ft (5.7 m^{2}); Mylar sail - 76 sq ft (7.1 m^{2})
- Jib/genoa area: Optional Dacron jib - 13 sq ft (1.2 m^{2})

Racing
- RYA PN: 1260 (RS Quba Sport)

The RS Quba is a one or two man monohull dinghy in the RS Sailing range of sailing boats. It is a popular boat for beginners.

== Performance and design ==
The RS Quba is a suitable dinghy for introducing newcomers to the sport of sailing. The shallow cockpit is spacious but is also light enough to be handled by children. The RS Quba is quick to rig, easy to carry on the roof-rack and demands virtually no maintenance. The RS Quba is ideal to teach the youngsters, cruise around the bay or even race with the more powerful Pro rig. The Sport mainsail has a crude roller reefing system and a jib can be added for sailing with two people. The hull is a highly durable Comptec PE3 construction system.
