= Topaz Magno =

Sailing dinghy

Development
- Designer: Ian Howlett
- Name: Topaz Magno

Boat
- Crew: 1–4
- Trapeze: Yes

Hull
- Type: Monohull
- Construction: Topaz TRILAM
- Hull weight: 89 kg (196 lb)
- LOA: 3.94 m (12 ft 11 in)
- Beam: 1.56 m (5 ft 1 in)

Hull appendages
- Keel: Centerboard

Sails
- Mainsail area: 8.12 m^{2} (87.4 sq ft)
- Jib/genoa area: 2.30 m^{2} (24.8 sq ft)
- Spinnaker area: 10.58 m^{2} (113.9 sq ft)

Racing
- RYA PN: 1175

The Topaz Magno is a Sailing dinghy created by Topper International designed for between 1 and 4 crew members, though usually 2.

== Performance and design ==
The Magno is a three-sail boat that can be sailed single-handedly due to its zip-reefing system in the mainsail. It has a spacious cockpit making it suitable for teaching groups.

The Magno is a dinghy that can be used for learning to sail and to club racing. The Magno, a mid-sized dinghy of the topper range, is a good boat for youth training, being stable with room for two trainees and an instructor. The boat also has a Gnav kicker system.
