= Norfolk punt =

Type of yacht

Development
- Year: 1916 - present
- No. built: 106

Boat
- Displacement: no minimum displacement
- Trapeze: 0-2

Hull
- LOA: 16 ft (4.9 m)
- Beam: 6 ft (1.8 m)

Sails
- Spinnaker area: unlimited
- Upwind sail area: 22msq

Racing
- RYA PN: 847 - 1117

The Norfolk Punt is a high-performance sailing dinghy designed for sailing on the Norfolk Broads.

Punts are pointed at bow and stern, are up to 22 feet long, and have no lower limit on hull weights. Sail area upwind is restricted to 22msq, whilst downwind is unlimited.

.

== History ==
Norfolk punts are derived from the flat-bottomed gun punts that roamed the Broadland waters in the mid-to-late 19th century. At the turn of the 20th century, in order to get to and from the hunting grounds more quickly, the punters developed their highly unstable craft to carry a basic mast and sail for travelling with the wind. Races were held between these dinghies and the Norfolk Punt Club was established in 1926.

== Traditional Punts ==
Many older Punts are still in existence today and race in the same fleets as the newer boats, on a handicap basis. Boats designed and built as early as 1918 are still regularly seen on the water.

Amongst the early designers were famous sailors such as Uffa Fox and Jack Holt, although most successful boats were from the drawing boards of local designers, the most prolific being Herbert Woods, Walter Woods, H.T. Percival and W. F. Mollett. Early boats were generally of clinker construction and varied from 16 to 22 ft (4.9 to 6.7 m), although once in the 1930s most designs were 22 ft (6.7 m). Initially gaff rigs were the norm, but as the class entered the 1930s Punt owners adopted Bermuda rigs.

Today many of the early Punts have been renovated or rebuilt. Some have been updated with carbon spars, trapezes and composite sails atop their varnished, century-old clinker hulls.

== One-design Punts ==
In the eight years immediately after World War II only one boat was built, and it became apparent that the post-World War II economy meant that a new breed of boat needed to be designed, if the class was not to disappear into ignominy.

Dick Wyche of Wyche and Coppock designed a 22-foot (6.7 m) boat made of plywood that proved far cheaper to build and lighter and faster to sail. This design moved the class into a new era, with the next 25 boats being built to Dick Wyche's plans and with the class incorporating the trapeze in the 1960s and offering a fibreglass alternative in the 1970s. In 1978 the Wyche and Coppock Punt had the distinction of being the fastest dinghy in production, achieving 13.8 knots at the World Speed Trials in Weymouth Harbour, faster than a Flying Dutchman. The 'Hardchine' Punt remains popular, possibly because of its performance in light to medium conditions: of the fourteen Punts built since 2000, eight have been to this design.

All Hardchine punts race under the same handicap, though rig configurations vary, from aluminium to carbon spars, single or twin trapezes and symmetric or asymmetric spinnakers. They are built to a set of One-design rules that ensure the hulls are the same shape, however material use can vary, including plywood, GRP, and foam sandwich composite, though there is a minimum weight for one design hulls.

== Development years ==
After 32 years of design 'hiatus', development was restarted to reinvigorate the class. The first of these new designs was a double-chine hull by Andrew Wolstenholme, of which only one was built, before Phil Morrison drew his design, which proved to be popular, with 12 built to date.

More designs from Fabian Bush, David Horne, Stephen Jones, Chris Wood and Andrew Friend broadened the spectrum and appeal of the class, with hull lengths from 18 to 22 ft (5.5 to 6.7 m) and diverse construction materials – sheet ply, clinker planks, cold moulded wood, fibreglass, carbon, Kevlar and strip-planked cedar – can be found in the development fleet.

== Sources ==
- "RYA Limited Data PY List 2023" (PDF). Royal Yachting Association.
- "Norfolk Punts, 1926–2006" by Jamie Campbell, published by Hamilton Publications
