= RS21 World Championship =

World Championship in the RS21 Class

The RS21 World Championship is annual international sailing regatta for RS21 keelboat, they are organized by the host club on behalf of the International RS21 Class Association and recognized by World Sailing, the sports IOC recognized governing body.

== Editions ==
Event			Host			Boats	Sailor			Ref.
Ed.	Date	Year	Host club	City	Country	Boats	No.	Nat.	Cont.	Ref.
1	1–6 Nov	2022	JK Briva Sailing Club	Biograd Na Moru	Croatia	40	165	12	2	
2	24–30 Sep	2023	Yacht Club Porto Rotondo	Porto Rotondo, Sardinia	Italy	53	221	11	3	
3	21–28 Sep	2024	Club Nautic L'Escala	L'Escala, Girona, Catalonia	Spain	40	163	12	2	
4	24–27 Sep	2025	Yacht Club Porto Rotondo	Porto Rotondo, Sardinia	Italy	49				

== Medalists ==
Year	Gold	Silver	Bronze	Ref
2022	ITA 225 Gianluca Grisoli (ITA); Andrea Casale (ITA); Fabio Gridelli (ITA); Giorgio Tortarolo (ITA)	ITA 244 Giovanni Meloni (ITA); Niccolo Bianchi (ITA); Camilla Cordero Di Montezemolo (ITA); Pietro Negri (ITA)	ITA 243 Martin Reintjes (GER); Francesco Rubagotti (ITA); Giulio Desiderato (ITA); Daniele Cassinari (ITA)	
2023	ITA 296 - Caipirinha Martin Reintjes (GER); Francesco Rubagotti (ITA); Daniele Cassinari (ITA); Giulio Desiderato (ITA)	AUS 326 - Nutcracker Robert Davis (AUS); David Chapman (AUS); Matilda Davis (AUS); Finn Alexander (AUS)	ITA 228 - DIVA Andrea Battistella (ITA); Ferdinando Battistella (ITA); Francesco Gabbi (ITA); Lorenzo Bressani (ITA)	
2024	ITA 336 - Stenghele Pietro Negri (ITA); Niccolo Bianchi (ITA); Giovanni Meloni (ITA); Camilla Cordero Di Montezemolo (ITA)	ITA 288 - Fremito D'arja Dario Levi (ITA); Jas Farneti (ITA); Stefano Cherin (ITA); Fausto Surini (ITA)	ITA 296 - Caipirinha Martin Reintjes (GER); Francesco Rubagotti (ITA); Daniele Cassinari (ITA); Giulio Desiderato (ITA)	
2025	HKG 295 - Les Freaks; Marco Pocci (ITA) Giacomo Ferrari (ITA); Giorgia Bertuzzi (ITA); Giovanni Meloni (ITA)	ITA 239 - ARVENIS; Davide Albertini Petroni (ITA) Filippo Baldassari (ITA); Samuel Naldi (ITA); Filippo Amonti (ITA)	ITA 293 - FRECCIA BLU; Marco Franchini (ITA) Davide Vignone (ITA); Giacomo Musone (ITA); Matteo Ivaldi (ITA)	
