= RS600 =

Type of sailing dinghy

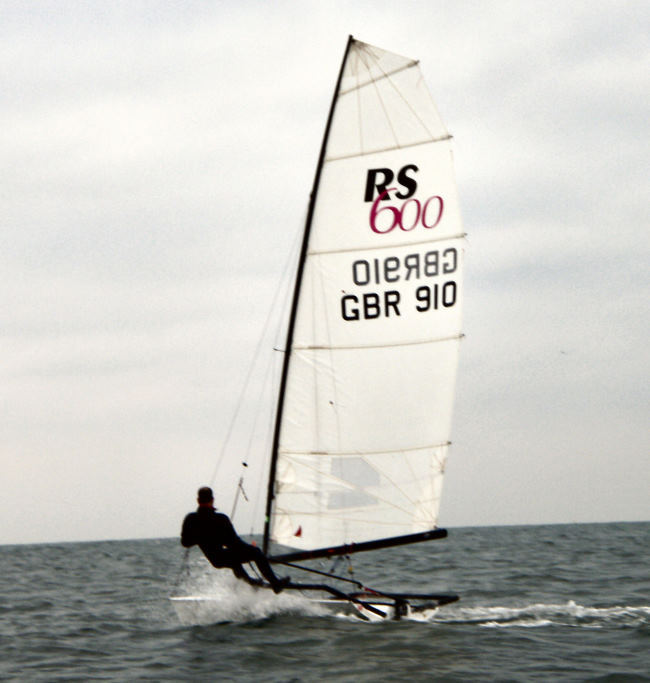
- The RS600, Narrow Wings

Development
- Designer: Clive Everest & Nick Peters
- Name: RS600

Boat
- Crew: 1

Hull
- Type: Monohull
- Construction: Epoxy & GRP Foam Sandwich
- Hull weight: 115 lb (52 kg) (167 lb (76 kg) total sailing weight)
- LOA: 14 ft 8 in (4.47 m)
- Beam: 6 ft 4 in (1.93 m) (7 ft 0 in (2.13 m) maximum beam with racks extended)

Hull appendages
- Keel: Daggerboard

Rig
- Rig type: Carbon composite mast & aluminium alloy boom

Sails
- Mainsail area: 131 sq ft (12.2 m^{2})

Racing
- D-PN: 76.2
- RYA PN: 920

The RS600 is a sailing dinghy designed by Clive Everest and Nick Peters and supplied by RS Sailing. It is now built by the Boatyard at Beer. It is a single hander with trapeze and racks. It has a Portsmouth Yardstick of 916 and a D-PN of 76.2.

== Performance and design ==
The RS600 has an epoxy hull, with aluminium racks available in 2 sizes, depending on the helm's weight. The mast is stayed, rotating, carbon fibre with a removable bottom section, allowing the mast to be shortened when the sail is reefed. Sail plan is a single Mylar fully battened main sail, with a zip in reef.

In 2007, the RS600 with hydrofoils became available. The hydrofoil version known as the RS600FF is a standard RS600 hull with rudder gantry, different foils and a wand attached to the bow. Most RS600FF's are retro fitted RS600s, though new built boats are available in both varieties.
