= RS100 =

Racing sailing class

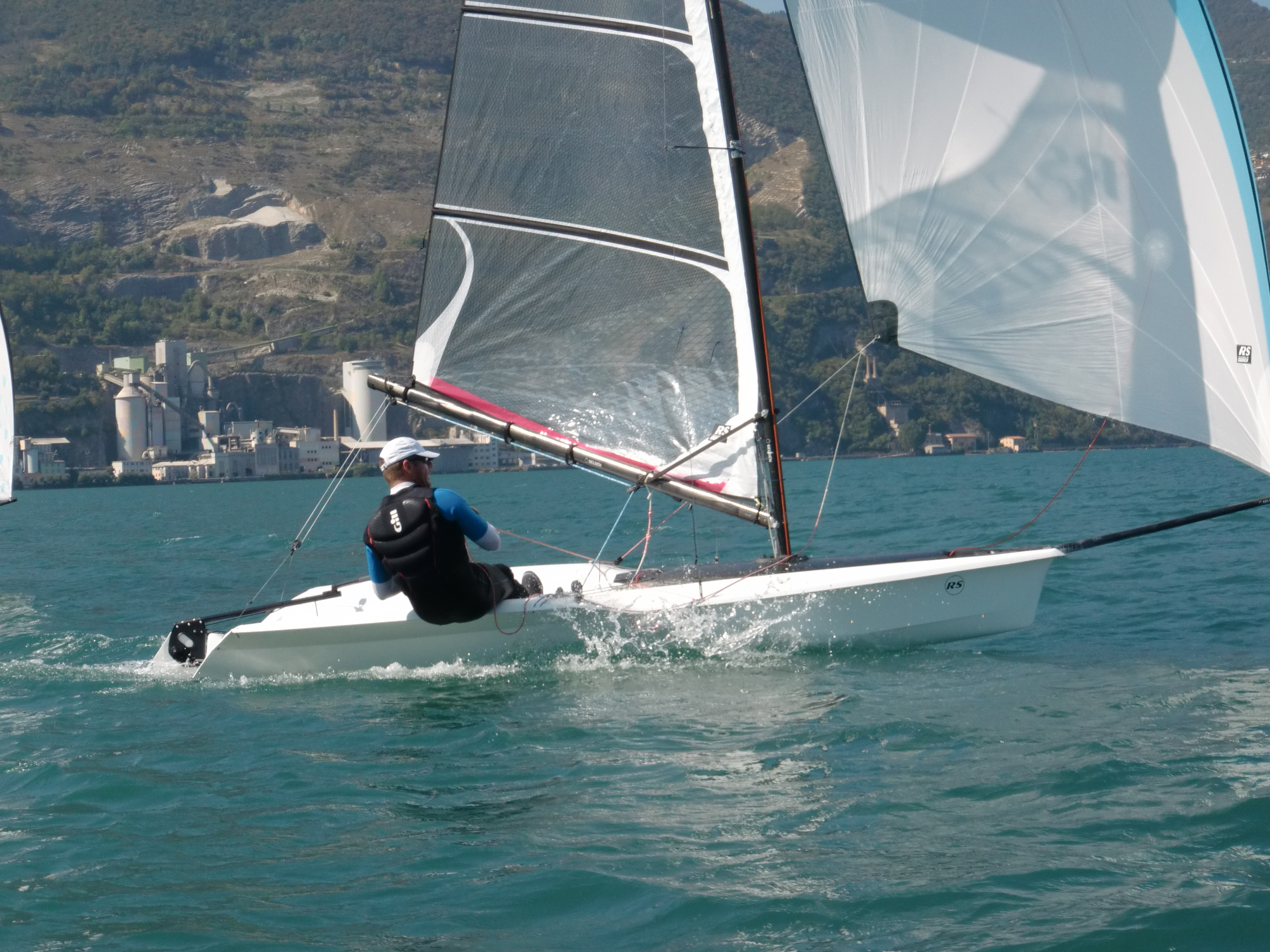
- RS100 on Lake Iseo

Development
- Designer: Paul Handley
- Year: 2009
- Design: One-Design
- Name: RS100

Boat
- Crew: 1

Hull
- Type: Monohull
- Construction: Epoxy & GRP Foam Sandwich
- Hull weight: 115 lb (52 kg) (176 lb (80 kg) total sailing weight)
- LOA: 14 ft 2 in (4.32 m)
- Beam: 6 ft 0 in (1.83 m)

Hull appendages
- Keel: Centerboard

Rig
- Rig type: Carbon composite mast (2 part)

Sails
- Mainsail area: 7.4 Rig - 77 sq ft (7.2 m^{2}); 8.4 Rig - 88 sq ft (8.2 m^{2}); 10.2 Rig - 107 sq ft (9.9 m^{2})
- Spinnaker area: 130 sq ft (12 m^{2})

Racing
- RYA PN: 7.2 Rig - N/A; 8.4 Rig - 1000; 10.2 Rig - 992

The RS100, first launched in 2009 by RS Sailing, is a singlehanded skiff. Possessing an asymmetric spinnaker the boat has two PY numbers of 981 for the 10.2 rig and 1004 for the 8.4 rig. The RS100 has a racing event circuit in the United Kingdom and in Europe, with the Eurotour beginning in 2011.

== Performance and design ==
A comprehensive development blog was kept throughout the design and testing and launch of the RS100.

The RS100 is a responsive and performance-oriented dinghy that planes easily. Its spinnaker significantly increases sail area, enabling strong downwind speed. Upwind, it performs at a level comparable to or slightly faster than a standard Laser, while off wind it is fast for a hiking dinghy and similar in speed to or quicker than RS400. The hull is generally stable with no major handling issues. However, it floats relatively high when capsized which can make recovery more difficult if the helm is in the water although in most capsizes, the helm remains dry. The boat is considered enjoyable to sail, offering quick acceleration and responsiveness without being overly unstable. It is not typically recommended for beginners but is well suited to sailors with some experience.

== Awards ==
- 2010 - Awarded Yachts & Yachting magazine's Dinghy of the Year in the UK.
- 2011 - Voted Sailing World magazine's overall Boat of the Year in the USA magazine's 25th annual awards.

== World Championships ==
Year	Gold	Silver	Bronze
2013; Hyères; 31 Boats	Alistair Dickson (GBR)	Antonio Tamburin (ITA)	Jack Holden (GBR)
2018; Weymouth			
