= RS Neo =

Sailboat class

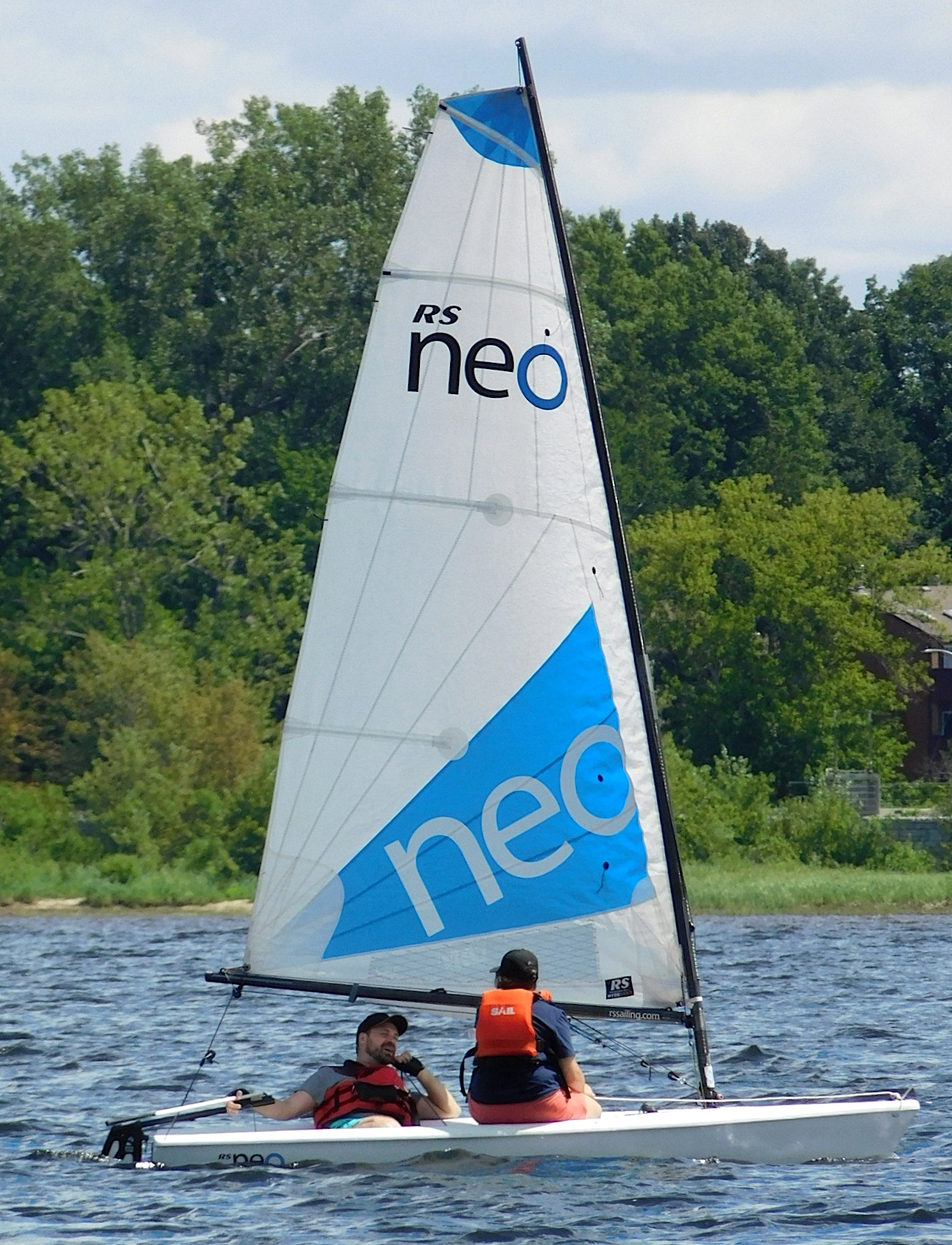

Development
- Designer: Paul Handley and RS Sailing
- Location: United Kingdom
- Year: 2017
- Builder: RS Sailing
- Name: RS Neo

Boat
- Crew: One
- Displacement: 141 lb (64 kg)

Hull
- Type: monohull
- Construction: RS Comptec PE3 rotational moulded sandwich construction
- LOA: 11 ft 7 in (3.53 m)
- Beam: 4 ft 8 in (1.42 m)

Hull appendages
- Keel: daggerboard
- Rudder: transom-mounted rudder

Rig
- Rig type: Bermuda rig

Sails
- Sailplan: catboat
- Mainsail area: 64.58 sq ft (6.000 m^{2})
- Total sail area: 64.58 sq ft (6.000 m^{2})

The RS Neo is a singlehanded British sailboat that was designed by Paul Handley and RS Sailing as a racer and first built in 2017.

== Production ==
The design has been built by RS Sailing in the United Kingdom since 2017 and remains in production.

== Design ==
The RS Neo is a recreational sailing dinghy, with the hull made from RS Comptec PE3 sandwich rotational moulded construction. It has a catboat rig with carbon fibre spars, with a free-standing, two-section mast. The hull has a raked stem, a plumb transom, a transom-hung aluminium alloy rudder controlled by a tiller with an extension and a retractable aluminium alloy daggerboard. The hull alone displaces 141 lb (64 kg) and the radial-cut Dacron mainsail has an area of 64.58 sq ft (6.000 m^{2}).

The maximum crew weight is 353 lb (160 kg).

Factory options include a launching dolly and boat trailer.

== Operational history ==
A description by West Coast Sailing described the Neo as, "a combination of boats - a sporty and fun singlehander - which is also durable and easy to own. The Neo is an inexpensive boat compared to other fiberglass options. Go faster than you'd expect, without spending double the amount on a race boat. Composite spars and advanced sail design on a stable and easily driven hull combine with the strong, low maintenance Rotomolded plastic construction. The Neo is a niche boat that’s accessible, affordable, and keeps things exciting."

== See also ==
- List of sailing boat types

Similar sailboats

- Laser (dinghy)
