= RS800 =

Light-weight sailing dinghy

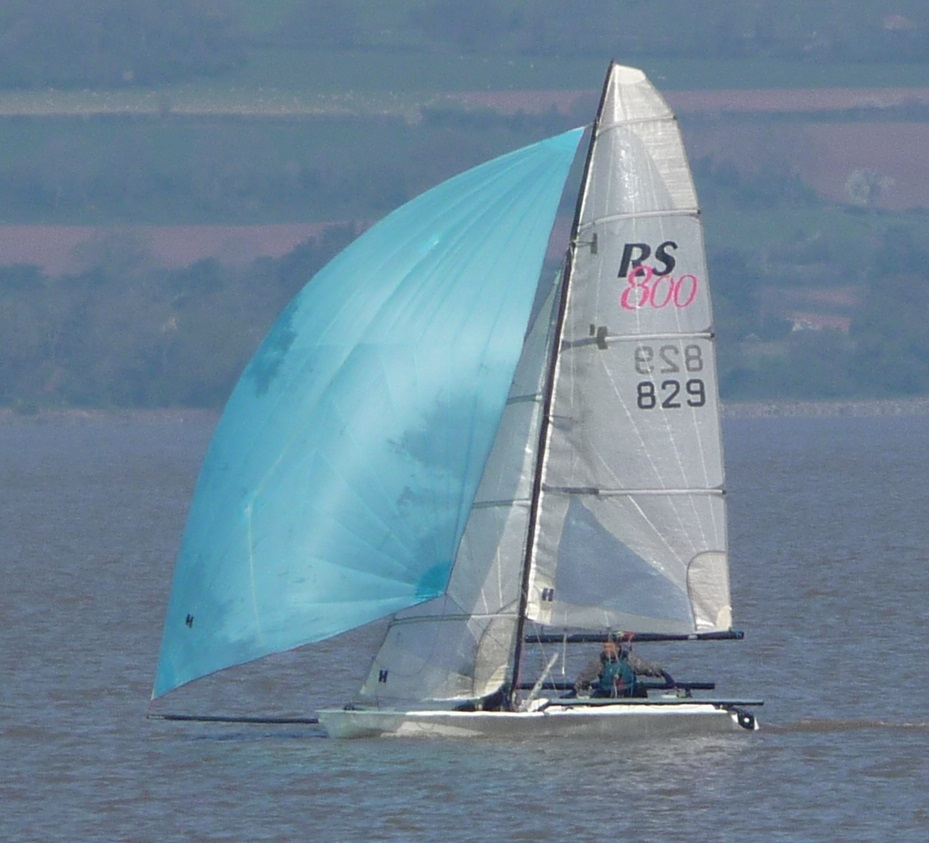
- RS800s downwind at Lake Garda.

Development
- Designer: Phil Morrison
- Name: RS800

Boat
- Crew: 2

Hull
- Type: Monohull
- Construction: Epoxy & GRP Foam Sandwich
- Hull weight: 136 lb (62 kg) (242 lb (110 kg) total sailing weight)
- LOA: 15 ft 9 in (4.80 m)
- Beam: 6 ft 2 in (1.88 m) (9 ft 6 in (2.90 m) maximum beam with racks extended)

Hull appendages
- Keel: Daggerboard

Rig
- Rig type: Carbon composite mast and bowsprit & aluminium alloy boom

Sails
- Spinnaker area: 225 sq ft (20.9 m^{2})
- Upwind sail area: 172 sq ft (16.0 m^{2})

Racing
- D-PN: 77.0
- RYA PN: 799

The RS800 is a light-weight sailing dinghy designed by Phil Morrison and manufactured by RS Sailing. The boat is sailed by two people both on trapeze and has a main, jib and spinnaker. The RS800 has a Portsmouth Yardstick number of 799 and a D-PN of 77.0. There is a large racing circuit in the UK, and some European events each year.

== Performance and design ==
The RS800 has a weight equalisation system with extendable racks and lead weights, making the boat accommodating for both male and female sailors. It is a twin trapeze boat and the jib is self-tacking and the spinnaker is designed with low loads on the sheets. In 2007 a new deck layout was adopted, removing the stepped side in favour of more open design to encourage easier 'run - through'. In 2013 the class approved a new sail plan with the introduction of a square topped mainsail to modernise the boat. In 2017 the class changed their rules to allow crews to operate the mainsheet and for the sheet to be taken directly from the boom without a deck cleat. This change is optional but has been popular in uptake within the class.
