= Splash (dinghy) =

Type of boat

Splash Dinghy
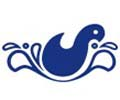
- Class symbol

Development
- Design: One-Design
- Name: Splash Dinghy

Boat
- Crew: 1

Hull
- Type: Monohull
- Construction: Fibreglass hull
- Hull weight: 55 kg (121 lb)
- LOA: 3.5 m (11 ft)

Sails
- Total sail area: 6.3 m^{2} (68 sq ft)

Racing
- RYA PN: 1220

The Splash Dinghy is 3.5 m (11 ft) in length and all boats are identical, thus, as is typical in One-Design classes, the sailor's ability rather than equipment is emphasised fleet racing. The boats employ an un-stayed mono rig with a sail area of 6.3 m2, which makes the class easy to handle by sailors ranging from 45 to 80 kg. This, combined with the low hull weight of 55 kg, allow the class to serve as a stepping stone between the Optimist Dinghy and boats such as the Laser Radial, suiting sailors in the age range from 13 to 21 years.

Competitions are held at club, national and international level. In New Zealand, UK, Netherlands, Sweden, and many other countries in Europe, the National Splash Associations arrange many events during the season, ranging from the travellers’ ranking series, training camps, coaching, national champs, and world selection trials.

New boats cost around EURO 4500, but second hand boats are considerably cheaper and some clubs have schemes whereby sailors can charter boats until they decide to continue with the class. The Splash is capable of speeds of over 10 knots on a broad reach, and has performance very similar to Laser 4.7 - its Portsmouth Yardstick is 1184, slightly higher than the Laser 4.7. It is similar in appearance to a Laser hull but is shorter and wider and has a vertical bow.

== Splash BLUE ==
The Splash is available called the "SPLASH BLUE" it is the standard Splash, this boat is designed for sailors weighing over 45–80 kg The BLUE has a Portsmouth Yardstick of 1220.

Until recently most Splash sailors at 18 had to move to the RED. Today, people can sail Splash BLUE in official regattas till the age of 21 years. Most sailors followed the Olympic route of Laser Radial and skipped the Splash RED (former Flash, as it can be a little over powering for the smaller sailor. Splash is ideal for sailors from the age of 13 till the age of 21 years. Now sailors at from all ages can sail a Splash in the Splash RED class.

The Splash BLUE is the international Class with their own World championships.

== Splash RED ==
Another version of the Splash is available called the "SPLASH RED" it has more sail area with the same Splash boom and the same size hull. The sail is 7.2 square meters. This boat is designed for sailors weighing over 70 kg The RED has a Portsmouth Yardstick of 1155, making it 4.6% faster than the Splash.

Until recently most Splash sailors at 18 had to move to the RED. Most sailors followed the Olympic route of Laser Radial and skipped the Flash, as it can be a little over powering for the smaller sailor. Now sailors at 18 can sail a Splash in the Splash Blue Class until the age of 20.

Splash RED has no age limit. You can sail Splash RED if you are 14 or 20 or 30 years. The class welcomes parents whose kids sail Splash BLUE. While parents sail at the same time Splash RED

Splash RED is a European Class on this moment. Mostly sailed in Germany, Netherlands, Czech Republic, Austria and Spain. There are also Splash RED boats in New Zealand, China, Panama.

== Splash GREEN ==
The Splash Green is a variant of the Splash introduced in 2014. It utilizes the same hull and boom dimensions as the standard model but features a smaller sail area. The boat is intended for sailors weighing under 50 kg and does not have an official Portsmouth Yardstick rating.

== AGE change ==
Until recently most Splash sailors at 18 had to move to the RED. Most sailors followed the Olympic route of Laser Radial and skipped the Flash, as it can be a little over powering for the smaller sailor. Now sailors at 18 can sail a Splash in the Splash + Class. In 2014 the Class changed the age for Splash till 21 years.

== World championships ==
The Splash is an ISAF international youth class yacht and each year a world championship is held.

The Most famous British Splash sailor was Bradley Field.

Recent world championship venues have included Tavira, Portugal 2008, and Split, Croatia 2007.

The 2009 world champs were in; Pwllheli, Wales on 8–14 August. Pwllheli Sailing Club

The 2010 world champs were in; Takapuna, Auckland on 2–8 January. Takapuna Boating Club
