= RS400 =

Type of dinghy

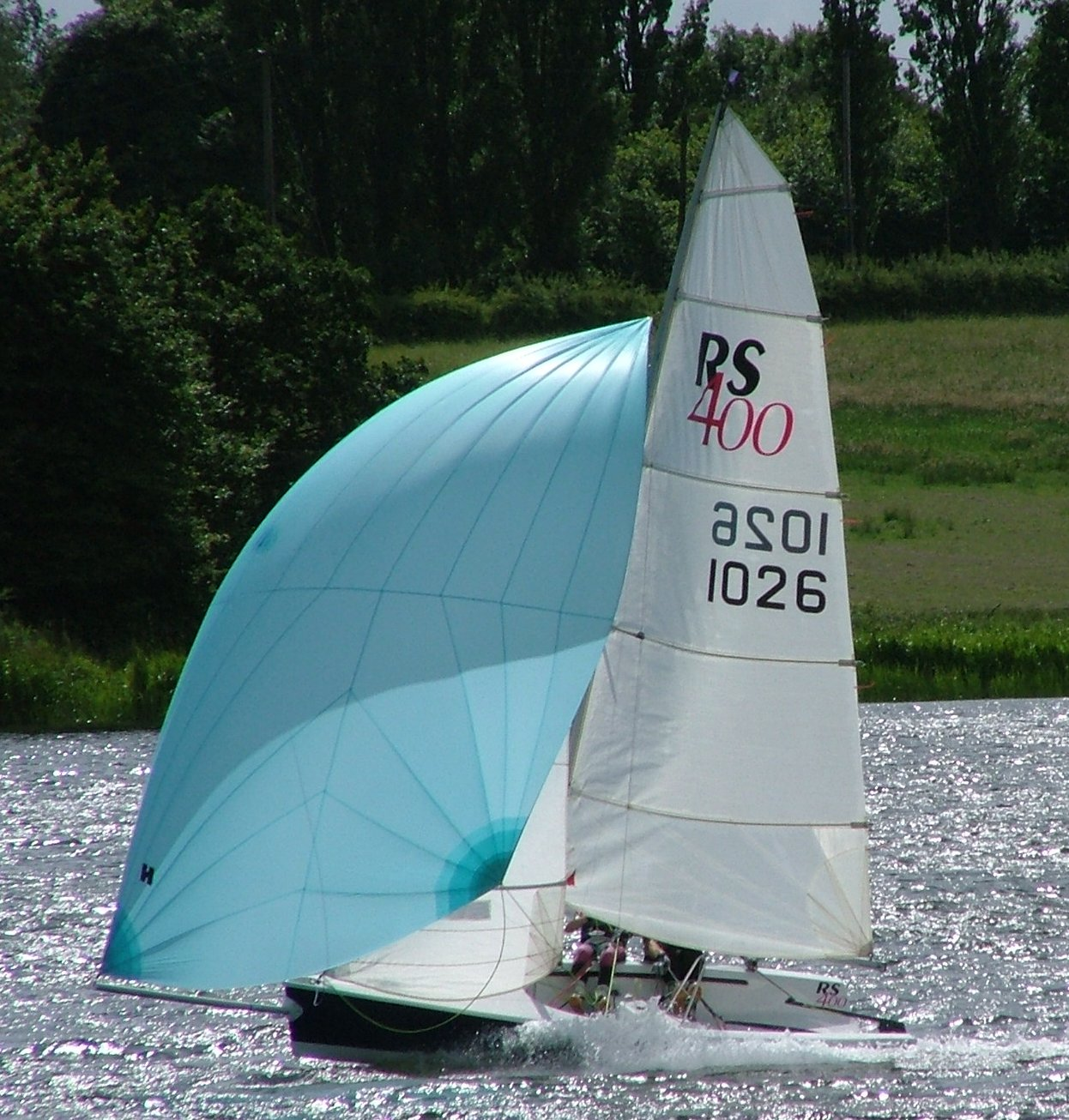
- The RS400 at Leigh & Lowton Sailing Club

Development
- Designer: Phil Morrison
- Name: RS400

Boat
- Crew: 2

Hull
- Type: Monohull
- Construction: Polyester GRP Foam Sandwich
- Hull weight: 187 lb (85 kg)
- LOA: 14 ft 10 in (4.52 m)
- Beam: 6 ft 6 in (1.98 m)

Hull appendages
- Keel: Centreboard

Rig
- Rig type: Aluminium alloy

Sails
- Spinnaker area: 150 sq ft (14 m^{2})
- Upwind sail area: 159 sq ft (14.8 m^{2})

Racing
- D-PN: 82.3
- RYA PN: 943

The RS400 is a lightweight sailing dinghy designed by Phil Morrison and manufactured by RS Sailing. The dinghy is sailed by two people and has a main, a jib and an asymmetric spinnaker. It has a PY of 948 and a D-PN of 82.3.

== Performance and design ==
The RS400 is designed for a wide crew weight range. The interior layout is simple, with the principal control lines being led to either side of the boat, so that either helm or crew can adjust the rig control settings.

The lightweight mast and mast bend can be controlled using a deck-level screw and adjustable spreaders. Rake and sideways bend are further variable via the jib halyard. Both the main and jib are fully battened. The asymmetric spinnaker has an extending/retractable bowsprit that can be biased/offset/"rocked" to windward, allowing the RS400 to sail deeper angles offwind/downwind.
