= RS600FF =

Development
- Designer: Clive Everest & Nick Peters (hull) & Full Force Boats (foiling kit)
- Year: 2007
- Name: RS600FF

Boat
- Crew: 1

Hull
- Type: Monohull
- Construction: Epoxy & GRP Foam Sandwich
- Hull weight: 84 lb (38 kg) (143 lb (65 kg) total sailing weight)
- LOA: 14 ft 8 in (4.47 m)
- Beam: 6 ft 4 in (1.93 m) (7 ft 0 in (2.13 m) maximum beam with racks extended)

Hull appendages
- Keel: Daggerboard

Rig
- Rig type: Carbon composite mast & aluminium alloy boom

Sails
- Mainsail area: 131 sq ft (12.2 m^{2})

The RS600FF is a modification of the RS600, light-weight sailing dinghy designed by Clive Everest and Nick Peters. It differs from the conventional RS600 as it has hydrofoils.

== Performance and design ==
It is a single hander with trapeze and racks, and a hydrofoil system similar to the International Moth. The Moth's ultra light weight have made them unsuitable for heavier sailors, the RS600FF was to an extent inspired by the Moth, but being bigger and suited to heavier crews was "made over" despite it being a one design class.
