= RS Quest =

Sailboat class

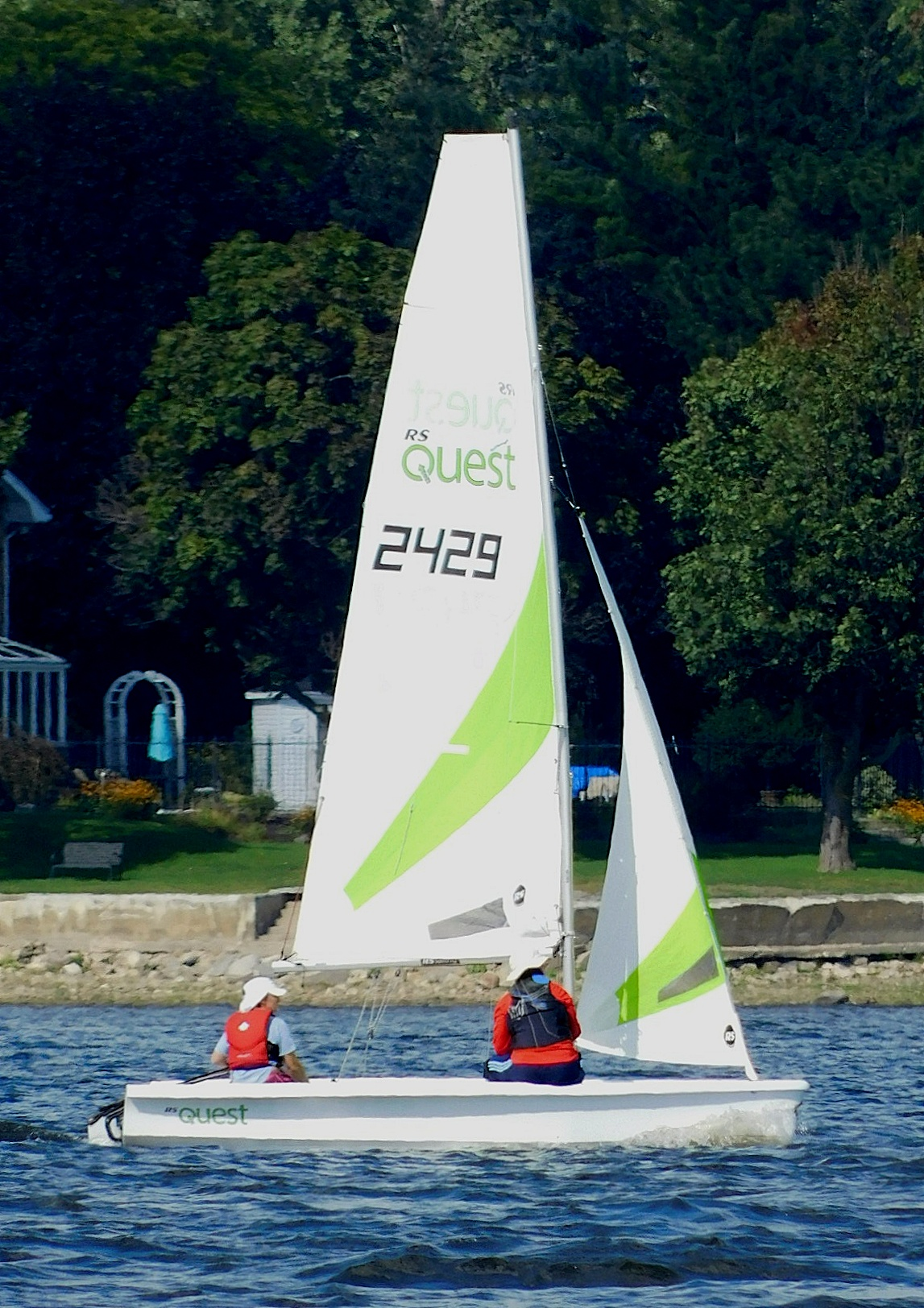

Development
- Designer: Jo Richards
- Location: United Kingdom
- Year: 2015
- Builder: RS Sailing
- Name: RS Quest

Boat
- Displacement: 309 lb (140 kg)
- Draft: 3.57 ft (1.09 m) with centreboard down

Hull
- Type: monohull
- Construction: Comptec PE3 polyethylene
- LOA: 14.07 ft (4.29 m)
- Beam: 6.00 ft (1.83 m)

Hull appendages
- Keel: centreboard
- Rudder: transom-mounted rudder

Rig
- Rig type: Bermuda rig

Sails
- Sailplan: fractional rigged sloop
- Mainsail area: 90 sq ft (8.4 m^{2})
- Jib/genoa area: 29 sq ft (2.7 m^{2})
- Spinnaker area: 107 sq ft (9.9 m^{2})
- Gennaker area: 118 sq ft (11.0 m^{2})
- Upwind sail area: 119 sq ft (11.1 m^{2})
- Downwind sail area: 235 sq ft (21.8 m^{2})

The RS Quest is a British sailboat that was designed by Jo Richards as a sail trainer and day sailer. It was first built in 2015.

== Production ==
The design has been built by RS Sailing in the United Kingdom, since September 2015 and remains in production.

== Design ==
The boat was designed for the British Sea Cadets to replace their existing fleet of older boats and also as a family day sailer.

The RS Quest is a recreational sailing dinghy, with the hull built predominantly of rotomoulded Comptec PE3 polyethylene. It has a fractional sloop rig with aluminum spars and wire standing rigging. The hull has a nearly-plumb stem, a vertical transom, a transom-hung aluminum rudder controlled by a tiller and a retractable glassfibre centreboard. It displaces 309 lb (140 kg) and can carry 805 lb (365 kg) of crew weight or four adults.

The boat has a draft of 3.57 ft (1.09 m) with the centreboard extended. Retracting the centreboard allows operation in shallow water, beaching or ground transportation on a trailer.

The boat may be optionally fitted with a small outboard motor for docking and maneuvering. The maximum power is 3.35 hp (2 kW) and maximum motor weight is 33 lb (15 kg).

Optional equipment includes a polyethylene foredeck, trapeze, an outboard motor mount, a launching dolly and a boat trailer for ground transport.

For sailing downwind the design may be equipped with an optional symmetrical spinnaker of 107 sq ft (9.9 m^{2}) or an asymmetrical spinnaker of 118 sq ft (11.0 m^{2}).

The boat's hull is 100% recyclable and the box it is shipped in is 100% recyclable material, made from 100% managed woodland materials, with a high percentage of previously recycled material. The hull wrapping material is biologically-based, made from 51% sugar cane waste, officially classified in the UK as paper and is also 100% recyclable.

== See also ==
- List of sailing boat types
