= RS21 =

Class of keelboat

RS 21 Keelboat
Development
- Designer: Jo Richards; Guy Whitehouse; RS Sailing
- Location: British
- Name: RS 21 Keelboat

Boat
- Displacement: 650 kg (1,430 lb)
- Draft: 1.38 m (4.5 ft)

Hull
- General: Monohull
- Construction: Eco-Friendly Composite
- LOH: 6.67 m (21.9 ft)
- LWL: 6.29 m (20.6 ft)
- Beam: 2.20 m (7.2 ft)
- Engine: Outboard

Hull appendages
- General: Bulbed Keel / Single Rudder
- Keel: Lifting Keel

Rig
- General: Sloop

Sails
- Mainsail area: 16.2 m^{2} (174 sq ft)
- Jib/genoa area: 8.4 m^{2} (90 sq ft)
- Gennaker area: 40 m^{2} (430 sq ft)

Racing
- Rating: 0.949 IRC

The RS21 is a class of one-design keelboat first launched in 2018 by RS Sailing.The boat was designed for between 3 and 5 people to race competitively, although it is most commonly sailed with 4 sailors. Jo Richards and Guy Whitehouse designed the boat.

The class gained World Sailing class status in 2021 and held it first recognised World Championship. With the initial fleet in Europe being joined by fleets in North America the class continues to grow. A detuned "club" version of the boat is available for sale training and fleet charter use.

The class has held an annual RS21 World Championship since 2022.
