= RS Tera =

International racing sailing class

- Class symbol

Development
- Designer: Paul Handley
- Design: One-Design
- Name: RS Tera

Boat
- Crew: 1

Hull
- Type: Monohull
- Construction: 3 layer Comptec PE3 Hull
- Hull weight: 85 lb (39 kg)
- LOA: 9 ft 5 in (2.87 m)
- Beam: 4 ft 0 in (1.22 m)

Hull appendages
- Keel: Daggerboard

Rig
- Rig type: Bermuda

Sails
- Mainsail area: Sport rig - 38 sq ft (3.5 m^{2}); Pro rig - 50 sq ft (4.6 m^{2}); Mini sail - 28 sq ft (2.6 m^{2})

Racing
- RYA PN: RS Tera Sport: 1451; RS Tera Pro: 1351

The RS Tera is a one-man monohull dinghy in the RS Sailing range of sailing boats. It is recognised by the International Sailing Federation (ISAF) as an international class, and is a popular boat for beginners and for children to race.

== Performance and design ==
The RS Tera is suitable for introducing newcomers to the sport of sailing, but is also a good boat to race. The boat is highly robust, and it is built with a self draining cockpit and is easy to right after a capsize, in addition to which it has a floating daggerboard. The boat is fairly small and light, meaning it is possible to transport on a roof rack, and that it is manageable on the water by younger children. The mast comes in two pieces, and the boom is padded.

Furthermore, the RS Tera can be rowed and has oarlocks. Built with a Comptec PE3 hull, the RS Tera has been described to have a modern look.

== Features and Specification ==
The RS Tera is available in 3 specifications: RS Tera Mini, RS Tera Sport and RS Tera Pro. The RS Tera Sport is designed with beginners and training centres in mind while the RS Tera Pro is more suitable to older, more experienced sailors. The weight range is between 30 kg and 70 kg and it can carry up to two children comfortably.

The RS Tera Sport has a reefable Dacron sail (the sail can be reefed to de-power in strong winds / for smaller children) while the RS Tera Pro has a battened Mylar sail which gives improved performance and an increase in power. There is also a Mini-sail for very small children, as young as 5 years old. All specifications fit on the same hull and same mast meaning that the same boat can be used for children of all ages and all abilities.

Hull:

- Constructed of rotor-moulded Polyethylene: Very strong and virtually maintenance free.
- Designed to be easy to handle with more finesse than rivals.
- Wide comfortable side decks mean children feel safe sat on the side of the boat.
- Light and easy to right after a capsize: Children do not need assistance to right and there are added righting lines to assist.
- Self draining cockpit: Drains as it sails so that children do not need assistance.
- Lightweight on a trolley for easy manoeuvring by children.

Rig:

- All rigs fit on the same hull - more versatile and cost effective
- Rig is far forward reducing the possibility of getting stuck "in irons" / head to wind
- Boom is high and padded to prevent head injuries
- 2 piece mast for transporting and storage

Options

- A rowing kit can be added for light wind fun
- Racing pack is available for more advanced sailors

== International Success, Awards and Recognition ==
- The RS Tera gained International World Sailing status in 2007.
- The RS Tera is an RYA Recognised Junior Class.
- The RS Tera is an World Sailing Learn to Sail boat.
