= RS200 (dinghy) =

Design of two-person racing dinghy

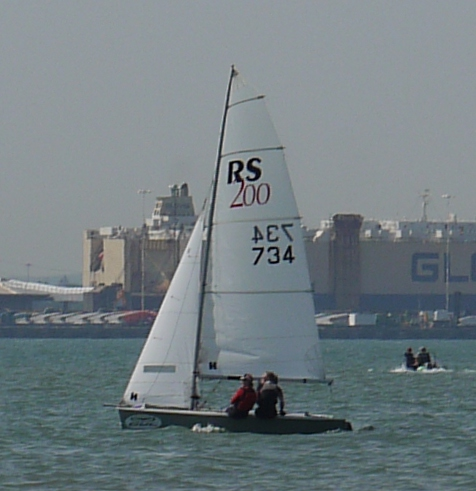
- An RS200 sailing on Lake Garda, Italy.

Development
- Designer: Phil Morrison
- Year: 1995
- Name: RS200

Boat
- Crew: 2
- Draft: 3.707349 ft 0 in (1.13 m)

Hull
- Type: Polyester GRP with Coremat. Vinylester resin infusion with coremat 2021 onwards
- Construction: Fiberglass
- Hull weight: 172 lb (78 kg)
- LOA: 13 ft 0 in (3.96 m)
- Beam: 6 ft 0 in (1.83 m)

Rig
- Rig type: Aluminium alloy spars

Sails
- Mainsail area: 98.27 sq ft (9.130 m^{2})
- Jib/genoa area: 29.7 sq ft (2.76 m^{2})
- Spinnaker area: 89 sq ft (8.3 m^{2})
- Upwind sail area: 124 sq ft (11.5 m^{2})

Racing
- D-PN: 88.3
- RYA PN: 1046

The RS200 is a 4m, double handed, hiking, racing dinghy. Designed in 1995 by Phil Morrison and manufactured by RS Sailing, it has a lightweight polyester GRP with Coremat hull construction.

== Performance and design ==
The RS200 utilises a single line asymmetrical spinnaker system and low sheet loads on the sail controls. It can be sailed successfully by pairs of sailors with combined weights of between 16 stone (100 kg) and 26 stone (170 kg). Both sailors hike; there are no trapezes or wings. The open transom assists drainage after a capsize and a moulded self bailer can be opened to remove any remaining water.
