= Frank Bethwaite =

New Zealand naval architect (1920–2012)

Francis Dewar Bethwaite DFC, OAM (26 May 1920 – 12 May 2012) was a New Zealand naval architect, author and Olympic meteorologist.

== Biography ==
Bethwaite was born in Wanganui, New Zealand, and built his first boat (a 16 ft sailing canoe) as a teenager. He joined the Royal New Zealand Air Force at the outbreak of the Second World War, becoming a flight instructor and test pilot before flying bombing missions over the Pacific during 1944 and 1945. He rose to the rank of squadron leader and was awarded the Distinguished Flying Cross. After the war he became a commercial airline pilot for Tasman Airways (later Air New Zealand).

Bethwaite had four children with his wife Nel: Christine, Mark (an Olympic and World Championship competitor), Nicola (also an Olympic and World Championship competitor) and Julian (World Championship Competitor and boat designer). After settling in Sydney, Bethwaite designed a small boat suitable for his youngest children to use to learn how to sail. This became known as the Northbridge Junior (now known as the 9er). Bethwaite is most well known for designing the Tasar and Laser 2 Dinghy Classes.

He was awarded the Medal of the Order of Australia in 2000 for his services to sport. In 2006 he won an Innovation Hero lifetime achievement award from The Warren Centre for Advanced Engineering at the University of Sydney for the design and commercialisation of innovative high-performance sailing craft. He died in 2012.

== As author ==
During his time as the meteorologist for the Australian sailing team at the 1976 Summer Olympics in Montreal, Quebec, Canada, Bethwaite collected copious wind data that led him to write his first book, High Performance Sailing. In 2008 he followed this up with a further volume, Higher Performance Sailing, also published by Adlard Coles Nautical. A third volume, Fast Handling Technique, was completed shortly before his death and published in January 2013.
