= RS Vareo =

International racing sailing class

Development
- Designer: Phil Morrison
- Year: 2001
- Name: RS Vareo

Boat
- Crew: 1

Hull
- Type: Monohull
- Construction: Polyester GRP with Coremat
- Hull weight: 155 lb (70 kg) (205 lb (93 kg) total sailing weight)
- LOA: 14 ft 0 in (4.27 m)
- Beam: 5 ft 2 in (1.57 m)

Hull appendages
- Keel: Daggerboard

Rig
- Rig type: Composite top and alloy lower mast

Sails
- Mainsail area: Fun sail - 85 sq ft (7.9 m^{2}); Competition sail - 94 sq ft (8.7 m^{2})
- Spinnaker area: 107 sq ft (9.9 m^{2})

Racing
- D-PN: 92.7
- RYA PN: 1085

The RS Vareo is a modern, single-handed sailing dinghy raced throughout the UK at both club and national level. The RS Vareo is a hiking singlehander with an asymmetric spinnaker.

Fleets have grown throughout the UK and a racing circuit has been developed by the RS Association with sponsored events & championships. The GUL RS Vareo National Championships saw a record fleet of 47 competing at Netley SC in July 2007.

== Performance and design ==
The RS Vareo has a PY of 1085, making it a little faster than the Laser dinghy in the RYA scheme.

However its D-PN is slower than that of a Laser, at 92.7. According to an independent review, the RS Vareo accelerates quickly upwind and can reach speeds of 12 to 15 knots downwind when fiited with its optional asymmetric spinnaker. Its open transom allows the hull to drain quickly after a capsize, and its cockpit is large enough to accommodate two adults.

Without the complications of a trapeze, the handling characteristics allow a broad range of sailors get the most out of their time on the water; without the challenges and pitfalls of a faster asymmetric single hander.
