= Olympic triangle =

The Olympic triangle is a sailing course used in racing dinghies, particularly at major regattas like State, National and World Titles and was used at the Olympics. (Olympic sailing now uses quadrilateral courses)

The remainder of this article should be read in conjunction with Sailing Instructions for the specific regatta or the International Sailing Federation (ISAF) Race management page, the Racing Rules and particularly Appendix L.

== Number and type of legs ==
The traditional Olympic triangle course consists of a lap (starting with a beat or work to windward from the starting line to the top, weather or windward mark, a first reaching leg to the wing mark (also known as the gybe mark), a second reaching leg from the wing mark to the bottom or leeward mark), a hot dog (a beat to the top mark with a square run back to the bottom mark), another lap and then a beat to the finish line, which may have one end at the top mark, or may be set beyond the top mark. When the finish line is set beyond the top mark, the sailing instructions need to specify whether the top mark remains a mark of the course on the final leg or whether it is to be ignored. There are generally 9 legs, 5 equal to the length of the windward leg (4 beats and a run) and 4 reaching legs (2 of each reaching leg), so once the leg lengths are known the total course length can be calculated. Roundings are generally to Port. Many sailing instructions only specify the length of the windward leg and the total course length, but see below on the use of the law of sines, trigonometry table and spreadsheets to calculate the angles and other leg lengths.

== Most common configuration ==
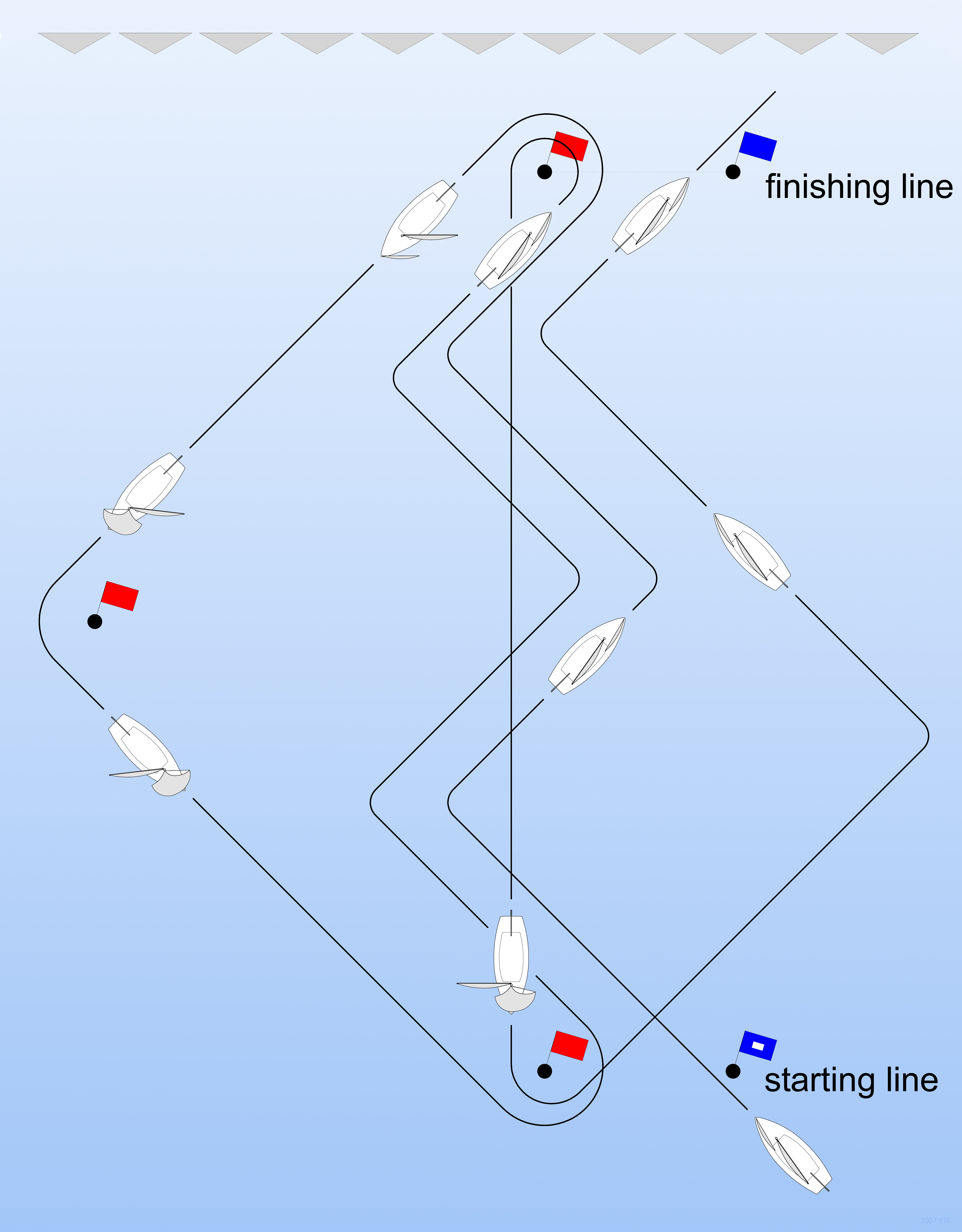
Olympic triangle

Traditionally the configuration of the triangle is an equilateral triangle (3 equal sides and 3 equal angles of 60 degrees) with a ratio of the windward leg to a reaching leg being 1:1. In that case the course length for the 9 legs described above is 9 times the length of the windward leg. The angle at each point of the triangle is 60 degrees. The windward leg is generally aligned with the average wind direction.

== Alternate configuration ==
Another configuration is a triangle with a right angle at the wing mark and 45 degrees at the top and bottom marks. In this case the ratio of the windward leg to a reaching leg is 1:0.7071 and the course length for the 9 legs described above is 7.8284 times the length of the windward leg. One would imagine that a triangle with 45 degrees at the top and bottom marks and 90 degrees at the wing mark would provide ideal reaching conditions on both reaching legs, provided the windward leg runs straight up wind. However, the wind will often shift during the race and the Committee may not always be able to shift marks to re-align the course to the new wind direction. With a 60, 60, 60 triangle, if the wind shifts 15 degrees either way, one of the reaching legs will be a 45-degree broad reach, while the other will be at 75 degrees to the wind and will be a close reach.

== Length of windward leg and course - time versus distance ==
Many dinghy classes have a target length for a race for the first boat. This time might take into consideration the age of competitors, how physically demanding the class is and how physically demanding the conditions are. 100 minutes is often used by Herons in Australia as an informal target (not specified in the Sailing Instructions). It is generally accepted that the whole of the course ought be completed in a race to ensure that all points of sailing are tested by competition. This requires consideration of the length of the course for a given class of boat in given wind strength.

When dinghies are sailing in displacement mode (as opposed to planing mode) they will take longer to complete a leg than if they are planing. The relationship between the time taken to complete a beat, compared to a run, compared to a reach will vary between classes at a given wind speed and by a class at varying wind speeds, with a significant change once boats are consistently planing on reaches (and runs).

Empirical evidence for Herons at 8 knots (15 km/h) of breeze on Botany Bay, Sydney with a windward leg length of 0.8 nautical miles (n.n.) saw a beat of 19 minutes, a reach of 9 minutes and a run of 13 minutes (non-planing conditions). With an equilateral triangle the traditional triangle, sausage, triangle, and beat to finish would require a windward leg of approx 15 minutes to allow for a completion time of approx 100 minutes for the first boat. In 8 knots (15 km/h) for a Heron the indicated windward leg length is approx 0.6 n.m..

Any Principal Race Officer wishing to have completed courses within a target time will need timing of completion of beat, reach and run legs over a wide range of wind conditions for the particular class to enable the setting of an appropriate length course (9 times the windward leg length in the traditional configuration described above). Race committees need to ensure that the sailing instructions regarding course length for each particular regatta have taken into account the aims of the Organising Authority in relation to all of target times, course length and course completion and that the achievement of some are not inconsistent with the achievement of the other(s). The possibility of changing leg/course lengths during a race needs to be considered to allow for changes in wind conditions.

== The starting line ==
The starting line often has a bias to the port end (the left end as one looks up the course towards the top mark) of 5 to 10 degrees towards the top mark from what the start line would be if it was straight across the wind direction. This bias encourages competitors to move to the pin end of the line as it is further up the wind towards the top mark. It also provides "cleaner" air to competitors on the port end of the line. With many competitors moving to the pin or port end of the line to be further to windward, there is room for the other competitors to form up along the line, and although they may be further down the wind from the top mark, they are more easily able to tack onto port tack should the wind shift or to get clear air. If there is no bias favouring the pin end, or more particularly if the starboard (committee boat) end is favoured (further to windward), competitors will be encouraged to avoid being on the line away from the committee boat and so the committee boat area becomes very congested and most competitors are not on the start line and do not start until some time after the starting signal as they have been queued up in the area to starboard of the starboard end of the line. Boats generally approach the starting line on starboard tack to maintain right of way over boats on port tack.

The length of the starting line is generally set by reference to the total length or width of the fleet, that is, the number of competitors by the length or width of each boat. While a general rule of thumb is 1.1 to 1.5 times the total length of the fleet, some race officers believe this is too generous according to ISAF. Another rule of thumb is 1.5 to 2.0 times the width of the fleet which is easy to calculate in a one design class, but is generally markedly less than 1.1 to 1.5 times the length of the fleet.

== The finishing line ==
The most flexible way to set the finishing line is to windward of the top mark, using a finishing mark and the committee boat as either end of the line. Generally the top mark should be ignored on the beat from the bottom mark to the finish, even if the top mark is left in place. The advantage of this configuration is that the finish line can be laid late in the race and laid so that the final work is a true beat - the line from the bottom mark to the centre of the finish line should be directly to windward.

== Some practical considerations ==
Some practical considerations include:

- Whether to set the wing mark higher (more to windward) by using an angle at the top mark of more degrees than the angle at the bottom mark and more than 45 degrees. This can reduce the problems of boats approaching the top mark on port tack having to give way to boats rounding the top mark to port and going low on starboard tack on the reach to the wing mark. For example, the angle at the top mark could be 75 degrees, 45 at the bottom mark leaving 60 at the wing mark.
- Whether to set the triangle so the competitors are assured of a good reaching leg even if the wind shifts and the marks are not moved.
- Whether to have Starboard roundings - Port roundings where the mark is left to the port side of the boat as it rounds the mark are most commonly used as they facilitate traffic flow around the top and bottom marks.

== Laying the course ==
The ISAF website (see link below) has a comprehensive Race Management document which contains comprehensive directions on how to lay the Olympic Triangle course.
