= Tasar =

Light two person sailing dinghy

- Class symbol

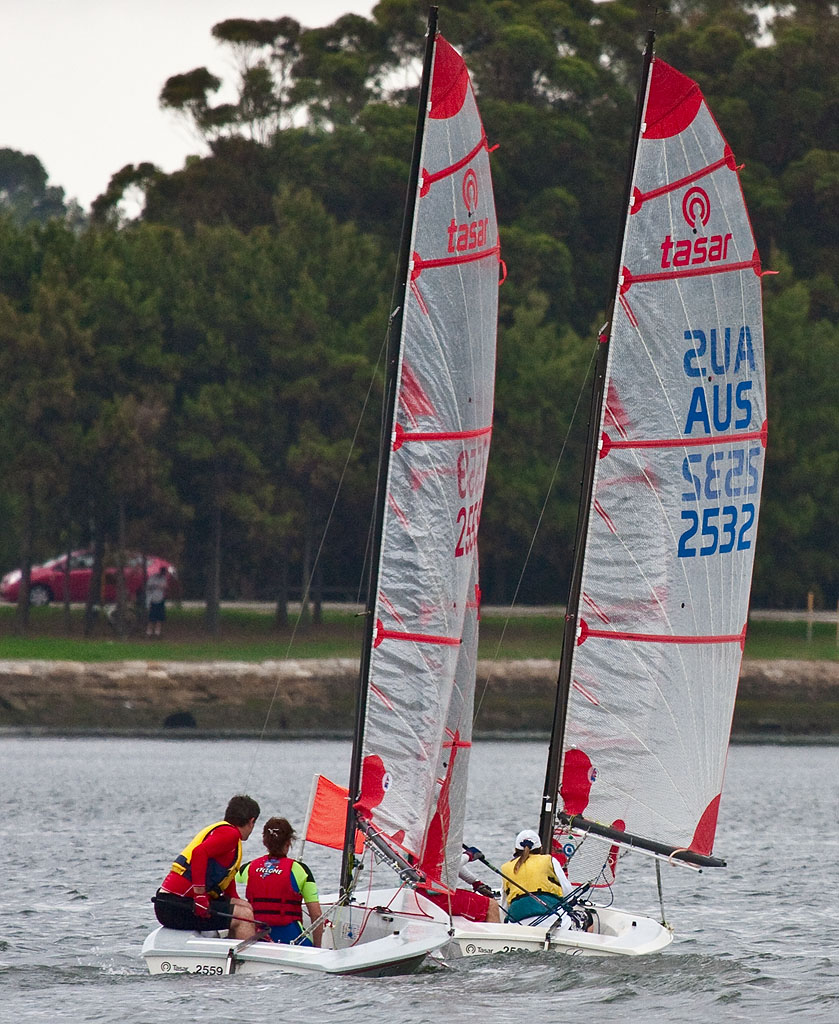

Development
- Designer: Frank Bethwaite, Ian Bruce
- Location: Sydney, Australia
- Year: 1975
- Design: One-Design
- Name: Tasar

Boat
- Crew: 2

Hull
- Type: Monohull
- Construction: Fiberglass (sandwich foam)
- Hull weight: 149 lb (68 kg) (fully rigged, minus sails)
- LOA: 14 ft 10 in (4.52 m)
- LWL: 14 ft (4.3 m)
- Beam: 5 ft 9 in (1.75 m)

Sails
- Mainsail area: 89.44 sq ft (8.309 m^{2}) (PET); 90 sq ft (8.4 m^{2}) (Polyester fiber)
- Jib/genoa area: 38.42 sq ft (3.569 m^{2}) (PET); 33 sq ft (3.1 m^{2}) (Polyester fiber)

Racing
- D-PN: 88.2
- RYA PN: 1015

The Tasar is a 14.83-foot (4.52 m) fiberglass 2 person sailing dinghy with a mainsail and jib. Designed by Frank Bethwaite of Sydney in 1975, the boat was technologically advanced for its time and continues to evolve. With no spinnaker, it is designed for a combined crew weight of around 140 kg. The hull weighs 68 kg, and is of sandwich foam construction. The hull has a fine angle at the bow to reduce wave impact drag with clean and sharp chines aft to ensure free planing and outstanding stability. The foam cored hull is stiff and light and the hull shape, together with a rig which combines a rotating mast with a fully battened main sail, allows the Tasar to plane upwind with the crew normally hiked. The wide beam and a cockpit are designed for sailing in winds up to 25 knots (46 km/h).

The Tasar is an international class, with strong fleets in Australia, USA, Britain, and Japan. The class gained status from the World governing body for sailing in November 2001 permitting the class to hold an officially recognised World Championships.

2006 saw the introduction of new PET film sails. In addition, the hull moulds have replaced and the class continues to evaluate.

The Tasar is constructed to the same specifications by licensed builders in Singapore and Canada. This keeps all boats as similar as possible and ensures a true one design class.

== Specifications ==
Length overall: 14 feet 10 inches (4.52 m)

Waterline length: 14 feet 0 inches (4.27 m)

Beam: 5 feet 9 inches (1.75 m)

Weight: Hull, fully rigged without spars, sails or foils: 149 pounds (68 kilograms)

Crew: Two, design crew weight 300 pounds (140 kilograms), minimum crew weight for racing 287 pounds (130 kilograms) (When boats are sailed by crews weighing less than this, ballast is carried to equalize performance.)

Sails: Sails were originally polyester fiber. PET film sails were adopted in 2006.

Mainsail: PET film - 89.44 sq ft (8.309 m^{2})., 8.31 m^{2}. (Polyester fiber - 90 square feet (8.4 m^{2}) - 8.36 square metres)

Jib: PET film - 38.42 sq ft (3.569 m^{2})., 3.57 m^{2}. (Polyester fiber - 33 square feet (3.1 m^{2}) - 3.07 square metres)

Portsmouth Yardstick Handicap: 1015

D-PN: 88.2

Construction: GRP foam sandwich for the hull, hollow aluminium section for the spars

Designers: Frank Bethwaite, Ian Bruce
