= Phil Morrison (yacht designer) =

British boat designer and racer

Phil Morrison is a British boat designer and racer rendered notable by the success of his many designs in many classes since 1967 as well as his own distinguished yacht racing career.

He was born in Eastbourne, England, in November 1946.

His designs embrace dinghies, yachts, rowing boats, and multihulls; he has been successful in a yacht and dinghy racing career since the late 1960s. He is noted for blending innovation with elegant well engineered structures and high performance, whilst also delivering users controllability and sailability.

== Dinghy designer ==
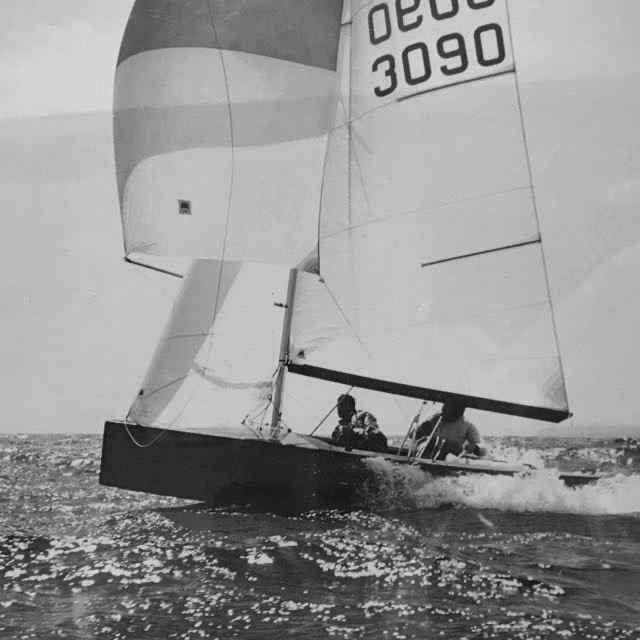
Merlin Rocket "Summer Wine" is one of Morrison's most iconic designs.

Morrison grew up in Eastbourne, during the late fifties and sixties. Joining the nearby Pevensey Bay Sailing Club he learnt to sail the National 12 Class racing dinghy. The National 12 is a development class where anyone can design and build new boats within specific restrictions, such as length, beam, weight and sail area. At the age of 18 he designed his first racing dinghy, a National 12 called "China Doll" (1967) which was built by Spud Rowsell in Exmouth, commencing a long association between the designer and that Devon town. Morrison sailed China Doll with Pete Wargent very successfully and the design became popular, making his name as a young designer, a series of different and successful National 12 designs followed over the next 25 years such as "Whisper" "Paper Dart" "Windfall" "Marmite Soldier" and "Crusader". He has also created the dinghy design named "X1".

Meanwhile, he qualified in Naval Architecture at Southampton College of Advanced Technology, then worked for marine fittings manufacturer Sea-Sure, designing a range of racing dinghy fittings which are still in production 35 years later.

Morrison designed his first Merlin Rocket "September" which he and Bill Twine built in Bill's garage which he followed with "September Girl" sailed by Phil at the Whitstable Championships in 1969. This led to a string of very successful Merlin Rocket designs such as "Satisfaction", "Smoker's Satisfaction", "Summer Wine" and "NSM" (New Smoking Material). Morrison's designs won every Merlin Rocket Championship for 17 years from 1972 to 1988.

His next step was to design an International 14, "Snoggledog", built by Laurie Smart, with which Morrison and Ray Sellings took second place in the Prince of Wales Cup race in Torbay in 1973, their second year in the class. Again this led to a string of designs for the Fourteens over the next 25 years.

Morrison designed several small keel boats during the 1970s such as the quarter-tonner "Bof" for Bob Brooks (who made the famous Cadbury's Smash Adverts with Martians made of dustbins).

Morrison campaigned the ultimate two sail racing boat the Olympic Star with Andy Street in 1983/4. Andy went on to win the Merlin Rocket Championship in The Feet, the first Merlin built by Jon Turner in 1987 which now resides in the National Maritime Museum in Falmouth.

== Sailmaker ==
During the mid-seventies Morrison started a sail loft based in Polegate near Pevensey Bay. He developed his own systematic and precise means of designing and cutting sails which enabled precise reproduction of previous designs — something which was an unusual feature amongst British Sailmakers at that time.

Like many other yacht designers of his generation he was significantly influenced in his approach to both yacht and sail design by "Sailing Theory & Practice" by the Polish Author Czesław A. Marchaj, first published in 1964.

An example of his talent and sophistication is that the suit of Flying Dutchman sails he originally made for Jon Turner, the very first sails he had made for that class, were subsequently used by Joe Richards to win a Bronze Medal in the Olympic Regatta at Long Beach.

== Off-shore designer ==
Bigger projects beckoned after Morrison moved his sailing making and design business to Exmouth in a new partnership with Spud Rowsell in the mid 1980s, the builder of his original design China Doll 17 years before. "Exmouth Challenge" a 53 ft offshore trimaran designed and built for Mark Gatehouse was Morrison's first multihull. Morrison says:

"With reference to Exmouth Challenge, the sizes of the amas (floats) on multihulls were gradually increasing in size at that time, but I did make a conscious decision that speed always comes from horsepower and horsepower for a trimaran relies on how hard you can lean on the ama. If we were going to lean on the ama to the max the ama might as well stay looking like a boat rather than a submarine. So the displacement of the Exmouth Challenges amas were each over 200% of the total displacement. Something which no doubt stood it in good stead in later life when it was converted into a block of flats. She wasn't exactly of high tech construction, quite the reverse simply plywood and strip plank cedar sheathed in glass and epoxy. At the time I was led to believe the whole boat cost less than Colt Cars carbon Mast!"

Yvon Fauconnier bought Exmouth Challenge, renamed her Umupro Jardin V and won the 1984 OSTAR. This classic trimaran - right on the leading edge of multihull design and construction development in the early 1980s had a long and distinguished competitive history and remains afloat today (2020) as a fast cruiser. Fauconnier then planned a 26 metre (88 ft) trimaran follow up teaming up Morrison with Marc Van Peteghem and Vincent Lauriot-Prévost leading to the three designers working together in France on the project for several months. Ultimately there was difficulty finding a main sponsor and project was shelved. Morrison went on to design other big offshore mono and multihull projects up to 60 foot in length.

Morrison's relationship with Fauconnier was a key event in the development of fast trimarans through its introduction of Morrison to these two young French Designers.

Peteghem and Lauriot-Prévost had trained in Yacht & Powerboat design in Southampton and had developed their initial appreciation of trimarans in the UK. They formed VPLP design and have since become one of the leading multihull designers worldwide. In an undated interview Vincent Lauriot-Prévost credits Phil Morrison with the revolutionary idea that they then successfully developed, large volume floats (amas), initially with the revolutionary Poulain for Olivier de Kersauson in 1986.

Poulain's hull similarity to Exmouth Challenge is obvious on inspection. Lauriot-Prévost says:

"Because in the meantime, the winner of the OSTAR 1984, it was Umupro Jardin ... (Phil Morrison design, first name was Exmouth Challenge). And the inspiration turns to voluminous amas and as long as the central hull, a radical change. Previously, the amas were sinking into the sea and Phil Morrison was successfully exploring a new approach with his 1982 Exmouth Challenge! On the foilers, the leeward ama did not sink because there was the vertical lift of the foil as soon as there was speed. We did not know all that yet but either we were gaining length at the waterline with a lot of finesse of hull, or we had a small ama with a foil: we discovered the balance sheets issue at all speeds ... With a large ama, we had a better dynamic stability in difficult conditions and we were more efficient in light winds because the foils dragged a lot. Also Olivier de Kersauson wanted to do a program around the world alone: he wanted big amas for security."

After Exmouth Challenge Morrison was recruited with Joe Richards, Pete Allen, Derek Clark and others by Peter de Savary's British America's Cup Challenge "Blue Arrow" ultimately aborted but a radical foil assisted boat recognisable as the original predecessor of today's foil borne AC75s.

Again Morrison was involved with cutting edge innovation in design.

== One design classes ==
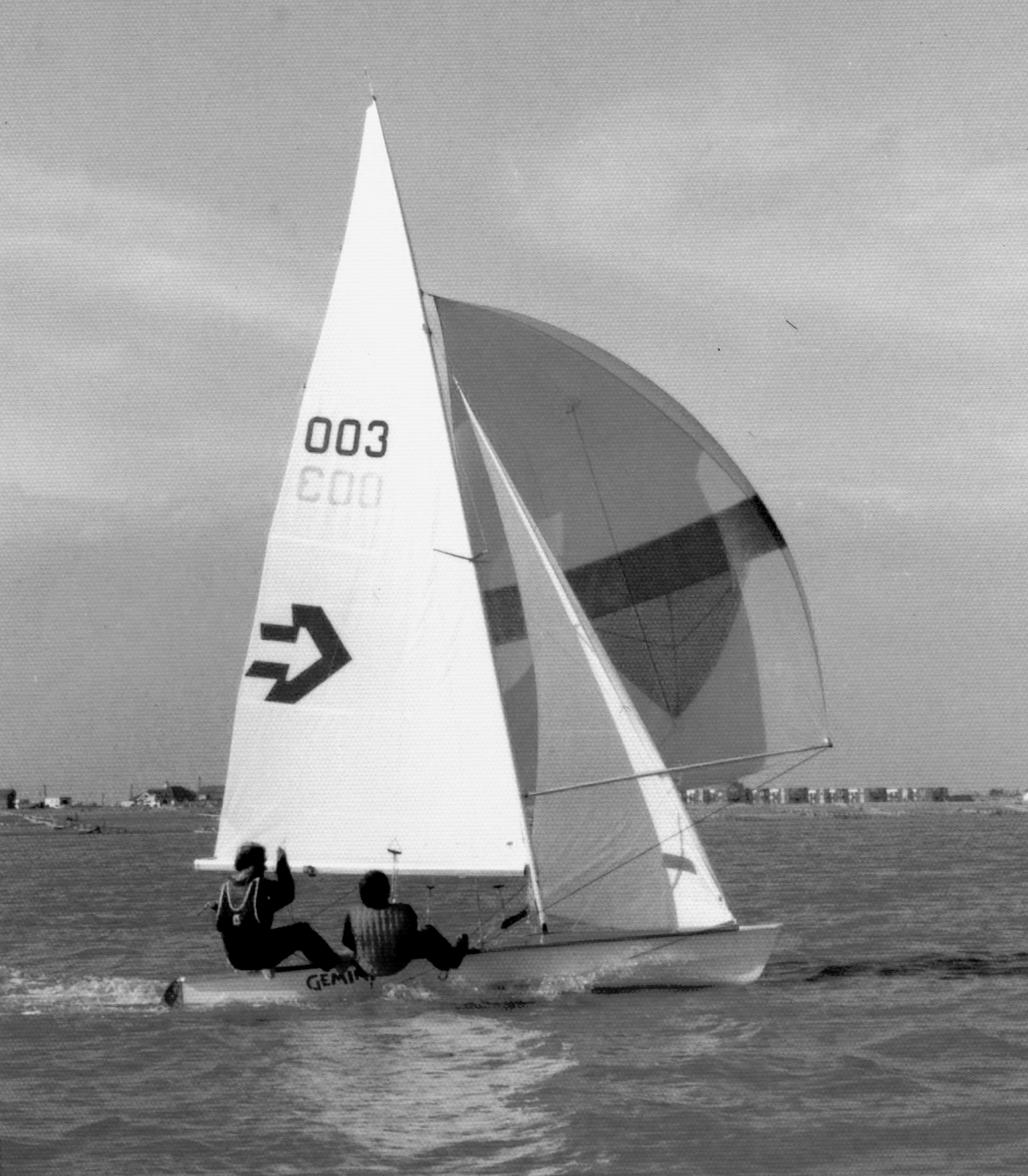
The abortive Gemini Class design became the foundation of the Laser 5000 now the RS5000 class

A precursor to his later interest in and wide influence on One Design Classes was his innovative NSM design for the Merlin Rocket class. It included the entire rig and fittings layout so that sailors knew how to set up the boats for best performance in different conditions. This included an easily adjustable mast strut, a high mainsheet hoop and Morrison Wires providing pre-bend and lateral stiffness to the mast. Spud Rowsell and Jon Turner won the Merlin Rocket Championships in "Foot-Loose" at Abersoch in 1978 with a points performance that has never been bettered and stimulated acceptance of Morrison's approach to designing a complete boat.

Morrison's first direct exposure to designing in the more restricted One Design Classes, classes of dinghy which are supposed to all be nearly identical, subject to normal building tolerances, came with an invitation to design an "optimised" version of the Ian Proctor classic design the Wayfarer for Gordon Frickers who is now a well known maritime artist. The resulting boat, "Wellington" was raced very successfully and Morrison went on to "optimise" designs in many one design classes as diverse as the Salcombe Yawl and the International Fireball, in the latter winning the World Championships with Jon Turner in Weymouth Bay in 1981.

After an earlier abortive attempt to start a new twin trapeze One Design Class, the "Gemini", in 1978/9 with Bill Twine (builder) and Nick Lightbody at Pevensey Bay, Phil started receiving commissions to design new one designs for dinghy manufacturers, starting with the Laser 5000 for what was then Performance Sailcraft followed by the Laser 4000 and Stratos and then by a series of designs for LDC RS200 RS400 RS800 as well as the RS Elite and the excellent but under-appreciated RS Vareo.

Exotic projects clearly fascinated him as a designer leading him to join the design teams of the last two British America's Cup Challenges, reuniting him with designers who had participated in National Twelves such as Jo Richards and Hugh Welborne.

In 1998 Morrison was commissioned by Richard Hartley to redesign the redoubtable Kestrel dinghy. As the Hartley Boats web site explains:

"It started when a pair of Kestrel Sailors were anxious about the future of their beloved boat and refused to let such a marvellous boat die. The decision was made to invest a considerable amount of money and time into the boat in an effort to re-design the interior and bring the boat up to today's standards. In February 1998 Rowsell and Morrison (in particular Phil Morrison) set about the task of re-designing the Kestrel to make it appealing to both existing and new generations of Kestrel Sailors. All modifications were discussed in great length with the Proctor family and the Kestrel Class Association and since then we have never looked back.

In 2005 we produced our first Mk4 Osprey which was overhauled by Phil Morrison to make it more appealing to the modern market yet, not changing it too radically so that it was still accepted by the original Osprey fleet, this was a storming success. The fleet continues to grow and it is holding its own against the newer high-performance asymmetric rivals.

Not ones to slow down, in 2006 our development was to take on the Wayfarer, Wanderer and Gull dinghies from Porters, later that year the Wayfarer was re-designed by Phil Morrison. Hartley Boats is very proud to still be building these boats here in Derby, UK and we continue the legacy of the Ian Proctor Designs."

In July 2007 Cliff Norbury is quoted by the Wayfarer Class Association as recommending the adoption of the updated Morrison Wayfarer design as follows:

“Richard Hartley, the new Copyright Holder of the Wayfarer dinghy, has commissioned Phil Morrison to update the design of the boat to incorporate new manufacturing techniques and modernise the internal layout, and be competitive with existing GRP and wood boats racing in the Class. A prototype of this new design has been produced, and Mr Hartley requested advice on whether the performance objective has been achieved, so that the new model could be satisfactorily incorporated into the Class. To satisfy this request a measurement exercise to determine the external shape of the boat was carried out on 16 May 2007 by Ken Kershaw, Technical Manager of the RYA, using the Bryan Jig developed by the RYA. Present were Richard and Mark Hartley, Phil Morrison, Ian Porter and myself. The method and equipment was the same as that used in January 2004 to measure a sample of wood and GRP Wayfarer hulls in order to report on the validity of the two wood hulls re-built by Duffin. We also had available an accurate hull measurement of Mike McNamara’s boat “Cordon Rouge” carried out by Ian Proctor in 1991. We were thus able to compare the hull shape of the prototype with existing hulls that between them cover the full range of variation accepted by the class as being within the rules and normal manufacturing tolerances. Having witnessed this measurement exercise and analysed the results, it is my considered opinion and advice that this new hull will have a good performance in relation to all existing boats. It could be bought with confidence by new owners but need not be feared by existing owners. The measurement process of course showed some variation in hull shape between the boats, some as a result of the normal variation that occurs over the years in the shape of GRP plugs, moulds and hulls, and in the case of wooden hulls the wide building tolerances accepted by the class rules. The measurements of the new hull fell generally within the range of the other boats. In those areas which could possibly affect performance, the new hull seemed to be a sensible but not extreme shape.

Cliff Norbury.”

Cliff Norbury is a former close colleague of Ian Proctor, the Wayfarer's designer, and former Managing Director of Proctor Masts the company founded by Ian Proctor to develop and sell lightweight aluminium masts for racing dinghies.

Morrison is now Britain's third great class dinghy designer after Jack Holt and Ian Proctor. Between 1944 and 2005, these three designers have designed 28 out of the 110 active dinghy classes listed by the Yachts and Yachting Magazine in the UK at the beginning of 2005, including the Cadet, Mirror, GP14 and Enterprise (Holt), Wayfarer Wanderer and Topper (Proctor), and nine of the Laser and Racing Sailboat ranges (Morrison).

=== Rowboat designer ===
Morrison has also established himself as a designer of ocean rowboats.

Phil Morrison, although now retired, is without question the most experienced Ocean Row Boat designer of our time. Phil was asked by Chay Blyth to design the row boat for the first Atlantic race over a decade ago and has since built on that design to create other more advanced boats to cater for the advance of new products and build materials.

== Personal life ==
Morrison has a son, Stevie Morrison, who established himself as a successful international yachtsman with a string of international successes in classes from International Cadets to 49ers He was the British Olympic Yachting selected helmsman for the 49er class in the 2008 Olympic Games in China and the London 2012 Olympic games.

== See also ==
- X1 (dinghy), sailing dinghy designed by Morrison
