= Merlin Rocket =

Dinghy sailed in the United Kingdom

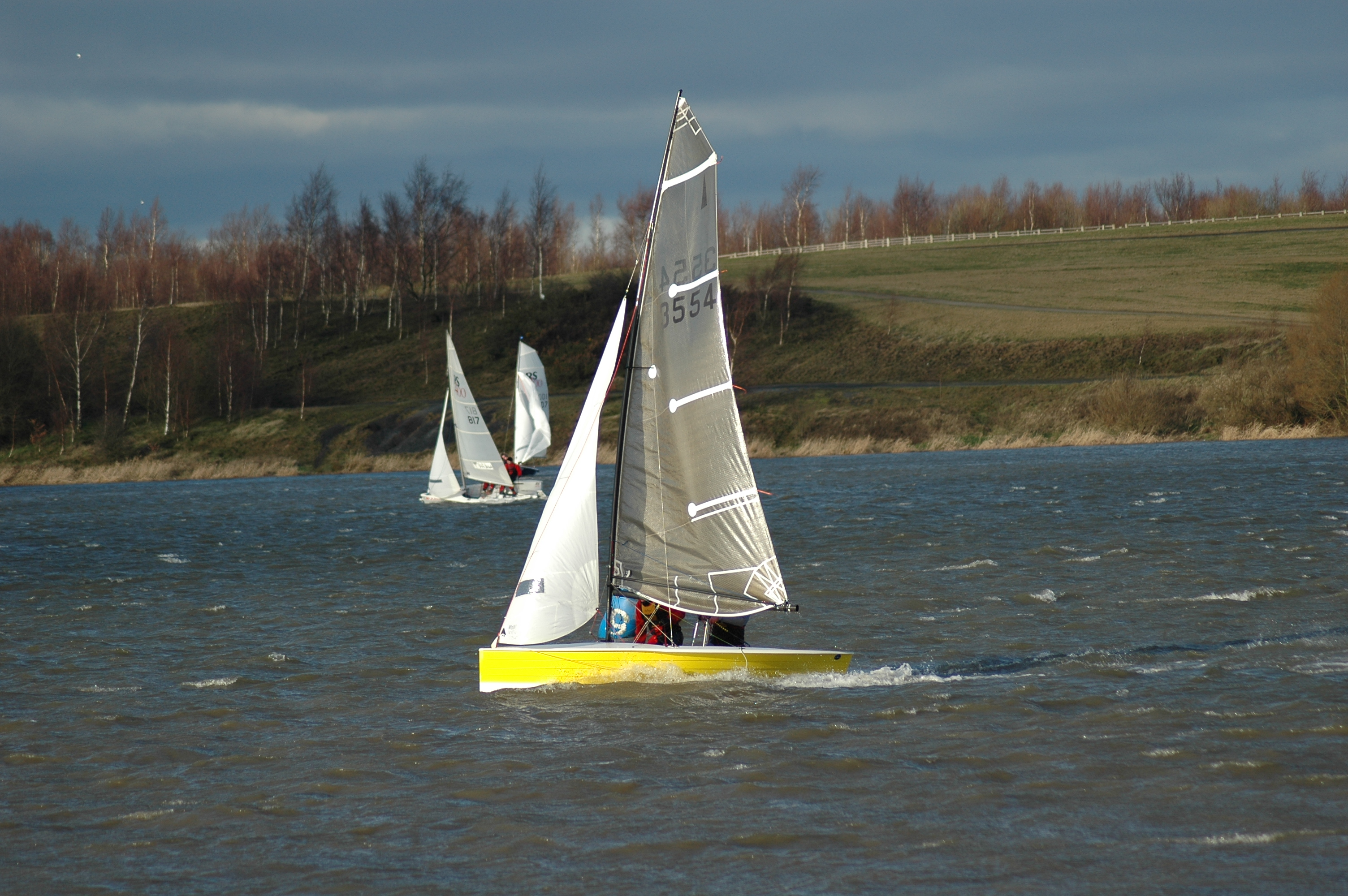
The Merlin Rocket.

The Merlin Rocket is a 14 foot (4.3 m) dinghy sailed in the United Kingdom. It is an active class, now with over 3800 boats built.

The boat designed around a box rule, meaning that all class boats need to be within a certain length and width, but can be any shape. This allows for quick modernization of the class. The great advantage to this is quick adoption to new technology and the ability to change a boat to a person's weight and ability. Although the rules allow for many sail plans, many modern Rockets have similar sails. Most have a high batten allowing for a large roach in the sail. Although the rules are open, they are not unlimited. Use of a Trapeze is forbidden in this class.

When competing in a mixed fleet, the Merlin Rocket uses a Portsmouth Yardstick handicap of 980 in the RYA scheme and 77.9 in the US Sailing scheme.

== History ==
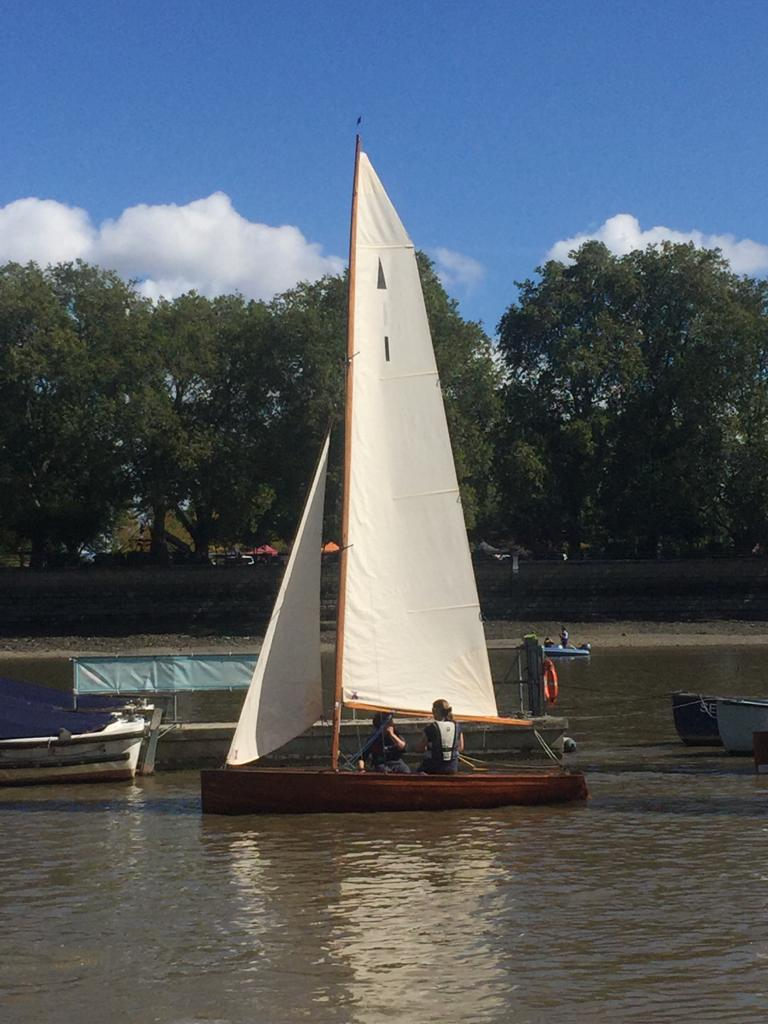
Merlin #1 'Kate' in Merlin Open at Ranelagh Sailing Club, Sept. 6, 2020

The 'Merlin Rocket class' was created by the merger of two previously separate classes. The 'Merlin' was originally designed in 1945/6 by Jack Holt as a result of discussions among and commissioning by a syndicate of members, including Holt, of Ranelagh Sailing Club, on the Thames in London. The prototype Merlin #1, named Kate after the last few letters in the word 'syndicate', continues to be sailed at Ranelagh Sailing Club. The second Merlin and first production boat is now in the collection of the National Maritime Museum Cornwall having been presented to the museum by Beecher Moore, a sailing and business partner of Jack Holt and another member of the original commissioning syndicate. The 'Rocket' class was formed in 1949 when a group of Tynemouth sailors commissioned Wyche & Coppock of Nottingham, also known for their building of the Norfolk Punt, to design a half deck 14 ft. dinghy which had more sail area, narrower decks and was lighter than the Merlin. After much debate the two classes merged in April, 1951 to form the 'Merlin Rocket Class'.
