= Portsmouth Yardstick =

Handicap system in sailboat racing

The Portsmouth Yardstick (PY) or Portsmouth handicap scheme is a term used for a number of related systems of empirical handicapping used primarily in small sailboat racing.

The handicap is applied to the time taken to sail any course, and the handicaps can be used with widely differing types of sailboats. Portsmouth Numbers are updated with data from race results, normally annually. The various schemes are not directly linked, and ratings for the same class can and often do vary in the different schemes.

The most prominent Portsmouth Yardstick systems are probably those administered in the United States by the Portsmouth Numbers Committee, in the United Kingdom by the Royal Yachting Association (RYA) and in Australia by Victoria Yachting.

== History ==
The original UK Portsmouth Yardstick was developed by Stanley Milledge, who was in charge of handicapping racing at the Langstone Sailing Club in 1947 using the Island One design as the scratch boat (having a value 100). In 1950 he received support from the Portsmouth Harbour Racing & Sailing Association to produce the first edition of the Langstone tables for club use when they would be known as Portsmouth numbers. In 1960 he handed over the administration to the RYA and in 1976 a new YR2 format was used, with the Langstone tables being removed in 1986. The Portsmouth Yardstick was extended to multihulls in 1973 and from 1977 four forms were used, for dinghy, multihull, keel and cruiser. Due to the increasing performance of boats, particularly multihulls, the base range of the numbers has been increased twice over the years and are now roughly centred on 1,000.

In the United States, the Thistle was chosen as primary yardstick for compilation in 1961 with a value of 83.0, which corresponded to its RYA PN rating at the time. Other boats were compared using their DIYRA (Dixie Inland Yacht Racing Association) rating to produce the D-PN (Dixie-Portsmouth Number). This proved successful and in 1973 the responsibility was passed from the DIYRA to the North American Yacht Racing Union. Wind Handicap Factors (HC) are an extension conceived by the DIYRA Portsmouth Numbers Committee to take a more realistic account of wind and wave conditions for different classes. This produces a factor based on F=100 for each point of the Beaufort Scale from 0 to 9. Further extensions are being evaluated for offshore classes to take account of sail inventories, excess weight, etc.

In Australia the most prominent Portsmouth Yardstick scheme is that run by Yachting Victoria Inc.

== Application ==
Each class of boat is assigned a "Portsmouth Number", with fast boats having low numbers and slow ones high numbers—so, for example, in the case of two dinghies, a 49er might have a RYA-PY of 697 while a Mirror has a RYA-PY of 1390 (these are the actual RYA Portsmouth numbers for 2018, but note that adjustments are made each year).

In a race involving a mixed fleet, finishing times can be adjusted using the formula:

- Corrected Time = Elapsed Time × Scale / Handicap

where Scale is 100 for US and AUS numbers, and 1000 for UK numbers, and Handicap is the applicable Portsmouth Number for the given class of boat. Each boat's time is adjusted with the formula, and then the adjusted scores are compared to determine the outcome of the race.

For example, a PD Racer (a semi-open homebuilt class, and the slowest listed boat in the USA scheme) has a D-PN of 140, and an A-Scow (the fastest listed centreboard boat) has a D-PN of 61.3. If an A Scow takes 1 hour to finish a given course, and a PD Racer takes 2 hours, the handicapped times are:

- A Scow: 1 hour × 100 / 61.3 = 1.63 hours
- PD Racer: 2 hours × 100 / 140 = 1.43 hours

So the PD racer, although it took twice as long to finish the course, would be declared the winner.

== Examples of boats and their Portsmouth Numbers ==
There are hundreds of boats that have a Portsmouth Number, or D-PN, or both; the table below gives some notable examples. The classes included below are from those used at the 2012 Olympics, the 2012 Paralympic Games, and the 2012 ISAF Youth Worlds. The official table of RYA PNs is published on the RYA Portsmouth Pages. The official table of USA D-PNs is published on the US Sailing website.

Class	Type	RYA PN	D-PN	VYC
49er	Dinghy	740	68.2	79.9
SL 16	Multihull		73.0	
H16	Multihull	802	76.0	
H18	Multihull		71.4	
F16	Multihull		63.0	
F18	Multihull		62.4	
29er	Dinghy	922	84.5	96.5
Sonar	Keelboat	940	81.0	
Star	Keelboat		83.1	98
470	Dinghy	973	86.3	101
Finn	Dinghy	1053	90.1	113.5
Flying Scot	Dinghy		90.3	
Laser	Dinghy	1087	91.1	113
420	Dinghy	1100	97.6	112
Laser Radial	Dinghy	1117	96.7	116
2.4 m	Keelboat	1250		

== Other handicap systems ==
Portsmouth Yardstick systems are typically used for dinghy racing and small keelboats or multihulls. Larger sailboats are more likely to use the Performance Handicap Racing Fleet handicapping system in North America, or the IRC handicapping system in Europe, Australia & New Zealand.

There are many other methods of handicapping sailboat racing, including performance handicapping systems such as Echo, used in Ireland, and NHC, used in the UK.

== Conversions between different Systems ==
=== USA - D-PN and PHRF ===
There is a linear correlation between the D-PN and PHRF (Performance Handicap Racing Fleet), allowing the following conversion formulae:^{2007 D-PN}

- D-PN = ( PHRF / 6 ) + 55
- PHRF = ( D-PN − 55 ) × 6
