= List of sailboat designers and manufacturers =

This is a list of notable sailboat designers and manufacturers, which are described by an article in English Wikipedia. Sailboat design and manufacturing is done by a number of companies and groups.

== Notable designers ==
Sailboat designer articles in Wikipedia:

- Alan Payne
- Ben Lexcen
- Bill Langan
- Bill Lapworth
- Bill Lee
- Bill Luders
- Britton Chance Jr.
- Bruce Farr
- Bruce Kirby
- Bruce Nelson
- Bruce Roberts
- Carl Alberg
- Charles Ernest Nicholson
- Charley Morgan
- C. Raymond Hunt Associates
- Dennison J. Lawlor
- Doug Peterson
- Edward Burgess
- Edwin Augustus Stevens Jr., Cox & Stevens
- E.G. van de Stadt
- Frank Bethwaite
- Gary Mull
- Germán Frers
- George Cassian
- George Harding Cuthbertson
- George Hinterhoeller
- George Lennox Watson
- George Steers
- Graham & Schlageter
- Greg Elliott
- Gregory C. Marshall Naval Architect Ltd.
- Group Finot
- Jens Quorning
- Johann Tanzer
- John Alden
- John Beavor-Webb
- John Illingworth
- John Laurent Giles
- John Marples
- John Westell
- Juan Kouyoumdjian
- J&J Design
- Rodney Johnstone
- Laurie Davidson
- Lyle Hess
- Mark Ellis
- McCurdy & Rhodes
- Myron Spaulding
- Nathanael Greene Herreshoff
- Olin Stephens & Roderick Stephens, Sparkman & Stephens
- Philip Rhodes
- Raymond Creekmore
- Robert Perry
- Robert W. Ball
- Ron Holland
- Sandy Douglass
- Starling Burgess
- Ted Gozzard
- Ted Hood
- Ted Irwin
- Tony Castro
- VPLP
- William Fife
- William Ion Belton Crealock
- William Shaw

== Notable manufacturers ==
Sailboat manufacturer articles in Wikipedia:

- Aegean Yacht
- Albin Marine
- Alexander Stephen and Sons
- Alloy Yachts
- Aloha Yachts
- Alsberg Brothers Boatworks
- Amel Yachts
- Archambault Boats
- Ariel Patterson
- Austral Yachts
- Baltic Yachts
- Bavaria
- Bayfield Boat Yard
- Beneteau
- Bowman Yachts
- Bristol Yachts
- C&C Yachts
- C. & R. Poillon
- Cabo Rico Yachts
- Cal Yachts
- Calgan Marine
- Cape Cod Shipbuilding
- Capital Yachts
- Cape Dory Yachts
- Caribbean Sailing Yachts
- Cascade Yachts
- Catalina Yachts
- Cavalier Yachts
- Clark Boat Company
- Classic Yachts
- Columbia Yachts
- Com-Pac Yachts
- Cooper Enterprises
- Cornish Crabbers
- Coronado Yachts
- Coastal Recreation
- CS Yachts
- CW Hood Yachts
- David Carll
- Dehler Yachts
- Douglass & McLeod
- Down East Yachts
- Dragonfly Trimarans
- Dufour Yachts
- Endeavour Yacht Corporation
- Ericson Yachts
- ETAP Yachting
- Freedom Yachts
- George Lawley & Son
- Grampian Marine
- Hake Yachts
- Hallberg-Rassy
- Hans Christian Yachts
- Hanse Yachts
- Hinckley Yachts
- Hinterhoeller Yachts
- Hodgdon Yachts
- Holland Jachtbouw
- Hughes Boat Works
- Hunter Boats
- Hylas Yachts
- Irwin Yachts
- Island Packet Yachts
- Jensen Marine
- J/Boats
- Jakobson Shipyard
- Jeanneau
- Jesse Carll (shipbuilder)
- Jeremy Rogers Limited
- Johnson Boat Works
- Jongert
- J. Samuel White
- Laguna Yachts
- Lancer Yachts
- Laser Performance
- Lockley Newport Boats
- MacGregor Yacht Corporation
- Marlow-Hunter Marine
- Montgomery Marine Products
- Melges Performance Sailboats
- Menger Boatworks
- Mirage Yachts
- Moses Adams (shipbuilder)
- Najad Yachts
- Nauticat Yachts Oy
- Nautor's Swan
- O'Day Corp.
- Ontario Yachts
- Oyster Marine
- Paceship Yachts
- Pacific Seacraft
- Palmer Johnson
- Pearson Yachts
- Perini Navi
- PlastiGlass
- Pogo Structures
- Precision Boat Works
- Rosetti Marino
- Royal Huisman
- Royal Denship
- Rustler Yachts
- S2 Yachts
- Seafarer Yachts
- Seidelmann Yachts
- Skene Boats
- Smith and Rhuland
- South Coast Seacraft
- Sovereign Yachts
- Su Marine Yachts
- Tanzer Industries
- Tartan Marine
- Universal Marine
- Vanguard Sailboats
- Vandestadt and McGruer Limited
- Varne Marine
- W. D. Schock Corporation
- Wally Yachts
- Watkins Yachts
- William H. Brown
- X-Yachts

== See also ==
- List of sailing boat types
- List of large sailing yachts
