= Astusboats =

Boat manufacturer

- Industry: Trimaran manufacturer

Astusboats is a French trimaran manufacturer based in Brech. The trimarans produced by this shipyard are designed by Stéphan Vallet, and have the characteristic of being trailerable due to the telescopic tubes in which the floats are mounted (except for the 14.1 model which is narrow enough to be trailed with the floats in place).

== Product line ==
The current product line is:

- Astus 14.1 (2007)
- Astus 16.1 (2006)
- Astus 18.1 (2010)
- Astus 20.1 (2005) - discontinued
- Astus 20.2 (2009)
- Astus 22.1 (2008)

== See also ==
- List of multihulls
