= USS LST-21 =

1943 LST-1-class tank landing ship

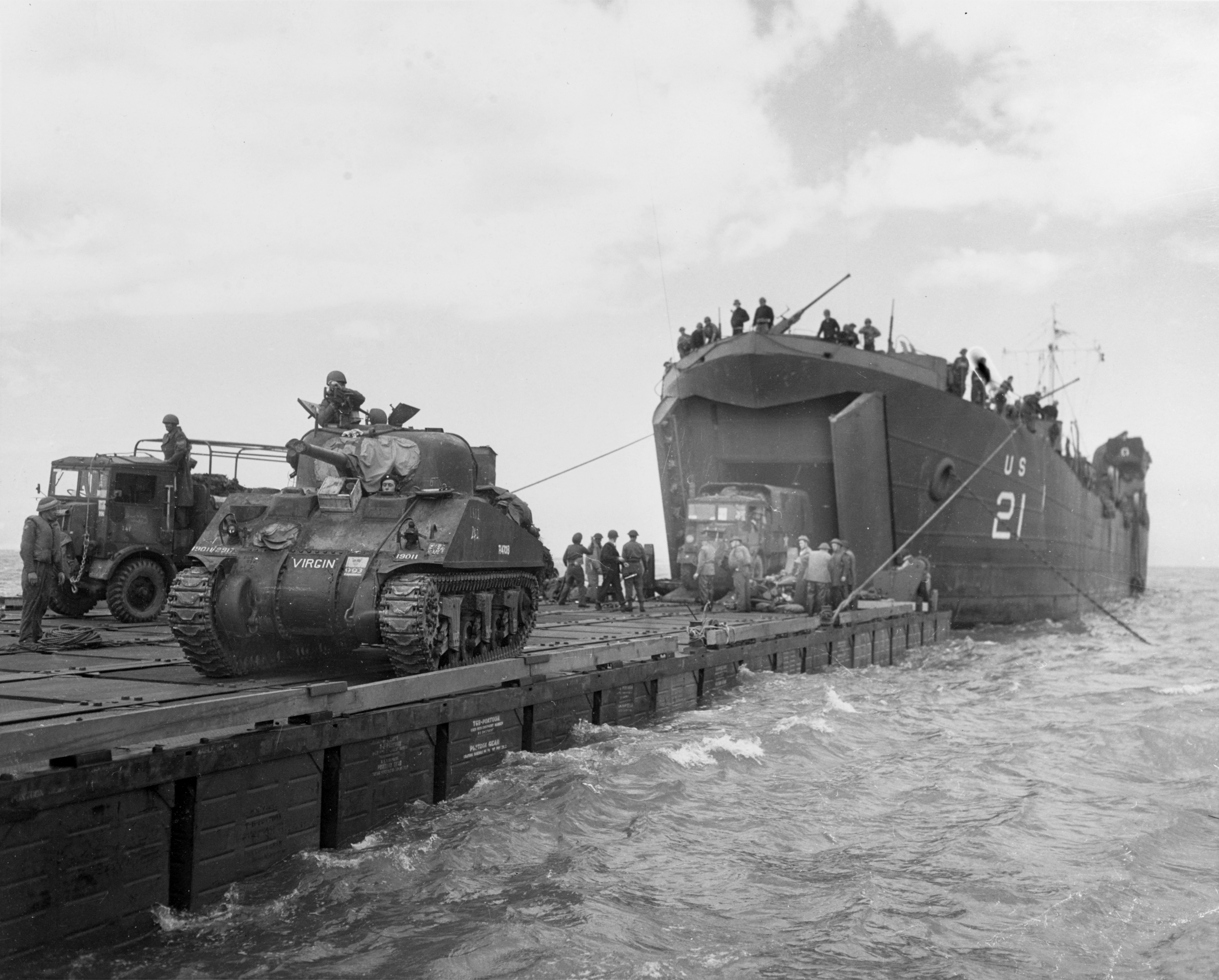
- USS LST-21 unloads British Army Sherman tanks and trucks onto a "Rhino" barge during the early hours of the Normandy invasion, 6 June 1944. Note the nickname "Virgin" on the "Sherman" tank at left.

History

United States
- Name: LST-21
- Builder: Dravo Corporation, Wilmington, Delaware
- Laid down: 25 September 1942
- Launched: 18 February 1943
- Sponsored by: Mrs. Lillian M. Lloyd
- Commissioned: 14 April 1943
- Decommissioned: 25 January 1946
- Stricken: 19 June 1946
- Identification: Hull symbol: LST-21; Code letters: NQFC
- Nickname(s): "Blackjack Maru"
- Honors and awards: 1 × battle star
- Fate: Sold for scrapping, 12 March 1948

General characteristics
- Class & type: LST-1-class tank landing ship
- Displacement: 1,625 long tons (1,651 t) (light); 4,080 long tons (4,145 t) (full (seagoing draft with 1,675 short tons (1,520 t) load)
- Length: 328 ft (100 m) oa
- Beam: 50 ft (15 m)
- Draft: Unloaded: 1 ft 6 in (0.46 m) forward; 7 ft 5 in (2.26 m) aft; Full load: 8 ft 2 in (2.49 m) forward; 14 ft 1 in (4.29 m) aft; Landing with 500 short tons (450 t) load: 3 ft 1 in (0.94 m) forward; 9 ft 6 in (2.90 m) aft
- Installed power: 2 × 900 hp (670 kW) General Motors 12-567A diesel engines, 1,700 shp (1,300 kW)
- Propulsion: 1 × Falk main reduction gears; 2 × screws
- Speed: 12 kn (22 km/h; 14 mph)
- Range: 24,000 nmi (44,000 km; 28,000 mi) at 9 kn (17 km/h; 10 mph) while displacing 3,960 long tons (4,024 t)
- Boats & landing craft carried: 2 x LCVPs
- Capacity: 1,600–1,900 st (22,000–27,000 lb; 10,000–12,000 kg) cargo depending on mission
- Troops: 16 officers, 147 enlisted men
- Complement: 13 officers, 104 enlisted men
- Armament: 2 × twin 40 mm (1.6 in) Bofors guns; 4 × single 40mm Bofors guns; 12 × 20 mm (0.79 in) Oerlikon cannons

Service record
- Part of: LST Flotilla 17
- Operations: Normandy landings (6–25 June 1944)
- Awards: American Campaign Medal; European–African–Middle Eastern Campaign Medal; World War II Victory Medal

USS LST-21 was a United States Navy LST-1-class tank landing ship used primarily in the Europe–Africa–Middle East Theater during World War II, but also transported British forces from Calcutta and landed them at Regu Beach, Burma.

== Construction and commissioning ==
LST-21 was laid down on 25 September 1942, at Wilmington, Delaware, by the Dravo Corporation. She was launched on 18 February 1943; sponsored by Mrs. Lillian M. Lloyd; and commissioned on 14 April 1943.

== Service history ==
During the war, LST-21 was crewed by the United States Coast Guard. She served primarily in the Europe–Africa–Middle East Theater from August 1943 until January 1946, but also transported British forces from Calcutta, India, and landed them as Regu Beach, Burma.

=== 1943 convoy duty ===
On 27 July 1943, LST-21 set sail from Little Creek, Virginia, for foreign waters. On the evening of 13 August 1943, the ship passed through Gibraltar and early in the afternoon of 14 August 1943, landed in Oran, Algeria. The trip was made without incident although there were three general quarters during the passage: (1) Once when destroyers were seen dropping charges and lighted buoys to mark the point of contact; (2) when another escort dropped charges; and (3) when an escort fired her 20 mm (0.79 in) cannon.

=== Italian campaign ===
On 11 September 1943, LST-21 set sail for Oran, Algeria, in company with LST-17, LST-25, LST-72, LST-73, LST-175, LST-176, LST-208, LST-209, and LST-261, and HMS LST-79, HMS LST-180, HMS LST-214, HMS LST-215, HMS LST-237, HMS LST-238, and HMS LST-239, for a rendezvous with Convoy KMS 25. This group of LSTs carried landing craft tanks (LCTs) on deck for delivery at destination.

After passing Algiers, the entire contingent of LSTs was ordered at 15:00 to return immediately to Algiers. At 20:24 LST-21 anchored off the harbor. At 11:30, 14 September, LST-21 entered the harbor where the LCT was removed. At 19:00 that evening, LST-21 set sail as flagship, under Commander W. S. Blair, for Syracuse, Sicily; in company with six LSTs. Off the Gulf of Tunis the group was ordered to return to Bizerte, Tunisia.

LST-21 arrived in Bizerte at 16:30, 16 September, and proceeded to Carouba Docks where 63 British trucks and officers and men of a Transportation Unit of the British 8th Army were loaded. At 22:00 on 17 September, LST-21 departed from Bizerte for Taranto, Italy, as the flagship in company with LST-25, LST-72, LST-175, LST-261, and HMS LST-214. Their escort was the British destroyer HMS Cuckmere. They arrived without incident at Taranto at 09:00, 20 September, and discharged their cargo. At 23:00 they got underway for Crotone, Italy, arriving at that port at 08:30, 21 September.

At 20:00, 21 September, they sailed for Catania, Sicily, with an additional unit LST-61. The Group arrived at Catania at 13:25, on 22 September. All units began loading vehicles. LST-21 took aboard all vehicles and officers and men. At 19:30, 22 September, they departed for Bizerte in company with LST-61, LST-175, LST-261, and HMS LST-214, with Cuckmere as their escort. On the morning of 24 September, they entered Bizerte harbor and discharged their cargo. At 12:30 they began loading 71 vehicles and 178 officers and men of the King's Royal Rifles.

At 20:00, LST-21 got underway and proceeded in company with LST-214 for Catania without escort. At 08:00, 27 September, they arrived at Catania and anchored awaiting further orders. At 12:00, they got underway for Taranto, Italy. At 08:30, 28 September, they arrived at Taranto and discharged their cargo during the morning. On 29 September, they took aboard 27 tanks and 18 vehicles as well as 184 officers and men of the 5th and 12th Canadian Transport Regiments. At 05:30, 30 September, they sailed for Barletta, Italy, in company with LST-175, LST-214, and LST-261, with minesweeper HMT Stroma for escort.

The group arrived off of Barletta on 1 October, at 13:00. They heaved to off the harbor and were boarded by British Naval Officers in Charge, who instructed them to proceed to Manfredonia to discharge the cargo. At 14:30, they got underway for Manfredonia staying well inshore to avoid the unswept minefields off the coast. At 17:00 they entered Manfredonia harbor and discharged their tanks. She was the first ship to land tanks on the Adriatic coast.

On 2 October, they departed Manfredonia, proceeded south along the Italian Coast and anchored at 18:00 in Brindisi Harbor. At 15:40 on 3 October, they departed Brindisi Harbor as additional escort for SS Ocean Vesper and proceeded toward Taranto. At 15:20, they arrived at Taranto and anchored in the outer harbor. At 18:00 LST-21 in company with and in command of LST-175, LST-214, and LST-261, departed Taranto for Algiers, Algeria, without escort. On 8 October, the Group arrived at Algiers at 21:15.

=== Tank landing at Regu Beach Burma ===
LST-21 sailed from Algiers, Algeria, to Port Said, Egypt, in October 1943, this time joining with Convoy UGS 19. She left 11 November, for Colombo, British Ceylon, arriving on 16 November, with Convoy BM 74.

On 1 December 1943, LST-21 was at Calcutta, India, on detached duty with the British Eastern Fleet. Embarking officers and men of the 15th Indian Corps as well as 13 "Lee" medium tanks, she was underway on 3 December, rendezvousing with LST-25 on 4 December, under escort of two Royal Indian Navy launches, with one B-24 Liberator and four Spitfires as aerial escorts. On 5 December, an air raid was reported but she beached at her destination without incident. At 22:30 on 5 December, she disembarked tanks at Regu Beach, Burma, and returned to Calcutta on 8 December 1943. This was the first American vessel to take the offensive in these waters in World War II.

At the end of December she left Calcutta, as part of Convoy CJ 9A, with 11 LSTs headed for Colombo, arriving 27 December 1943.

=== 1944 convoy duty from Africa to United Kingdom ===
LST-21 joined Convoy MKS 38 at Bizerta, Tunisia, in January 1944, as it was en route to Gibraltar, arriving 1 February. Forming Convoy MKS 38G she rendezvoused with Convoy SL 147 and sailed for Liverpool on 2 February, arriving on 13 February 1944.

On 28 January 1944, LST-21 got underway from Bizerte to join a convoy leaving the Mediterranean for England. They were noted to have air coverage as a protection against glider bombs. On January 31, an oceangoing tug out of Oran came alongside each ship in the group to deliver charts for the approaches to Plymouth, England, as they had left Bizerte without such charts. Later that day, LST-21 learned that its ultimate destination had been changed to Milford Haven, Wales.

On 1 February 1944, LST-21 sailed past Alboran Island and at 18:30 passed through the Straits of Gibraltar. The convoy continued heading west until they were over 200 mi (320 km) off the coast of Spain and then headed north. They sailed without incident until 5 February, when, at 09:30, one of the destroyer escorts let go with a white flare and started screening the starboard side of the convoy with a smokescreen. At 12:22, they sighted an unidentified aircraft dead ahead and high. An escort ahead opened fire and it soon disappeared into the clouds. The convoy presumed they were spotted.

On 7 February 1944, at 08:25, an escort off of the starboard beam hoisted the black pennant and dropped a depth charge. At 09:00, two British aircraft carriers and seven sloops as escorts rendezvoused with the convoy. At 12:55, an escort ahead indicated an underwater contact and, at 13:02, dropped five depth charges in quick succession. LST-21 went to General Quarters but the escort later gave up the search. At 13:23, an escort astern indicated contact but continued with the convoy after a brief delay. At 15;10 another escort on the starboard bow made a contact and ran alongside the starboard side of the convoy and, at 15:13 dropped one depth charge. Another escort joined the search, but a few minutes later they gave up the search and took station with the convoy. It was determined that they had run into a "wolf pack" of German U-boats.

At daybreak on 8 February 1944, planes from the escort carriers were covering the convoy. At 13:00, the convoy changed course and started the last leg of the route toward the British Isles. At 19:30, fog set in and all ships were out of sight of LST-21 which turned on navigation lights and sounded whistle to avoid collision. At 8:45, the fog lifted and at 24:00 the convoy executed an emergency turn to starboard. On 9 February, at 00:35, the convoy resumed it course. At 01:13, they received a radio message that a submarine, U-238, was sunk off the port side of the convoy. At 08:11, the convoy executed an emergency turn of 45 degrees to port, and at 08:40 resumed course. At 10:10, an escort on the starboard bow indicated a contact. LST-21's radioman tuned into an extra receiver on the escorts' and the planes' frequency and the officers and crew in LST-21's wheelhouse listened in on their communications. At approximately 11:00, a plane reported a sub on the surface bearing 150 degrees. The pilot kept repeating this to the Escort Commander, until the reply came back: "Stop telling us about it and get the 'bowstud.'" A few minutes later, the plane reported back: "One down. One down." At 12:14, all ships received a message from the convoy commander confirming the sinking of the second submarine. The weather was thick and visibility only about a mile and a half. At 16:45, they received another message from the Commodore confirming the sinking of a third submarine. The escorts and planes were noted to be having a difficult time with communications due to all of the contacts, real or imagined.

On 10 February 1944, soon after daybreak, the Convoy Commodore sent out another message to all ships announcing that a fourth submarine had been sunk during the night. At 08:30, all LSTs were detached from the main convoy and they headed east to make land. LST-215, with Commander Owles, R.N., was flagship. On 11 February, LST-21 and the other LSTs of Commander William Blair's group (except LST-72 and LST-261 which remained in Oran for repairs) were detached off the southwest coast of Ireland and given one escort. Other LSTs proceeded up the west coast of Ireland for eventual destination of Scapa Flow.

Because of the change in destination from Plymouth to Milford Haven, and thus having no charts of the south coast of Ireland, LST-21's navigation officer took a plotting sheet and drew in the mineswept channel and the lights were plotted in by taking their position from the Admiralty list of lights. With that as a chart, they proceeded through the mineswept channel. At 14:55, the escort reported unidentified aircraft and fired its anti-aircraft guns. LST-21 went to General Quarters.

On 12 February 1944, at 09:00 LST-21 entered Milford Haven and at 09:40 moored off the town of Milford following what was described as a rough and tiring trip.

=== Pre-Normandy Invasion activity in Wales, England and Northern Ireland ===
LST-21 remained in Milford Haven until 3 March 1944, when it sailed with other LSTs to Plymouth, England. LST-21 arrived in Plymouth, on 4 March, and remained moored there overnight. On 5 March, LST-21 sailed to Portland, and anchored off the harbor in Weymouth Bay. On 6 March, LST-21 moored in Portland Harbor. At 03:30 on 8 March, LST-21 loaded vehicles and then anchored in Weymouth Bay on 9 and 10 March. At 10:15 on 10 March, LST-21 joined a convoy as part of Operation "Fox", arriving at Slapton Sands at 6:15 on 11 March. LST-21 beached and discharging its vehicles there as part of that rehearsal for invasion. After anchoring of Slapton Sands for the night, LST-21 got underway on 12 March, for Plymouth, anchoring there briefly before sailing back to Milford Haven, arriving there on 14 March. On 15 March, LST-21 entered the tidal basin at Milford Haven with LST-17. On 16 March, LST-21 was moved to the drydock where it remained until 22 March, at which time it returned to the basin. On 28 March, LST-21 moved out of the basin and into the Haven.

On 31 March 1994, LST-21 sailed to Derry, Northern Ireland, with LST-17, LST-25, LST-72, LST-73, and LST-261. On 1 April, they reached Lough Foyle, and anchored off Moville, before proceeding toward Derry with a pilot, and to the naval base at Lisahally. On 3 April, LST-21 proceeded to the Derry docks where new guns were installed. On 10 April, LST-21 left the Derry docks and sailed out to sea, arriving at Rosneath naval base, Rosneath/Greenock, Scotland on 11 April. On 13 April, LST-21 set sail for Falmouth, England, and entered Falmouth Harbor on April 14. Thereafter, prior to 4 May, LST 21 sailed from Falmouth to Portland, then to Southampton and then to Solent.

=== Normandy invasion ===
By February 1944, LST-21 was in England preparing for the invasion of Normandy. On 16 April 1944, she was transferred with other ships of LST Division 101, Group 51, Flotilla 17, from detached duty with the 11th Amphibious Force to British operational control. LST Division 101 consisted of LST-21 as the flagship, along with LST-17, LST-25, LST-72, LST-73, LST-176, and LST-520, all under the tactical command of Commander William S. Blair, USNR. The Division was assigned to Force G, Group "Able." On 1 June 1944, she proceeded to Southampton, England, where she loaded 20 officers, 205 men and 73 vehicles of the British Army and after being sealed proceeded to anchorage off the Isle of Wight. Rhino ferry F-100 and a Rhino tug reported on 4 June 1944, and were secured by a stern cable to LST-21 to be towed to Normandy. On 5 June, she got underway at 16:18 in company with LST Group 33, Group 51 of Division 101 and ten craft of the Coast Guard's Rescue Flotilla One and escorts and proceeded to the Normandy coast of France near Le Hamel/Asnelles, and Arromanches-les-Bains. En route the Rhino tug broke loose and drifted off. At 12:10 on 6 June 1944, LST-21 arrived in the "Gold Beach" assault area and cast off the Rhino ferry. At 13:50 she discharged six DUKWs from her ramp.

Considerable activity was observed on the beaches and the "Jig Green" beach area was under fire from a German 8.8 cm (3.5 in) gun situated west of Arromanches-les-Bains. British cruisers lying about two miles (three point two kilometres) off shore carried out a naval bombardment of that area. At 11:46 shells from another German 8.8 cm gun began falling near ships in the area and a British destroyer north of LST-21 engaged the shore battery. The first load was taken into the beach at 15:40 by Rhino ferry and at 19:15 LST-21 got underway toward the beach to meet the Rhino ferry which was laboring through tidal current setting due east. The seas were choppy and the wind freshening. The LST took on 13 casualties from a DUKW and the Rhino ferry returned at 21:45 and departed at 22:40 with the remaining vehicles disembarked from LST-21. The LST then got underway for her assigned anchorage. Ten minutes later ships began making smoke on a red alert, followed nine minutes later by a second red alert. Two minutes later, amidst anti-aircraft fire from the west three bombs successively hit the water on the port beam, a fourth hitting 150 ft (46 m) off the starboard bow. At 22:30 a stick of four bombs hit the water from broad on the port bow to dead ahead, 300 ft (91 m) and at 23:42 a stick of four bombs hit the water 300 yd (270 m) off the port bow. No damage to LST-21 resulted from any of these attacks. There were intermittent alerts and anti-aircraft fire during the morning of 7 June 1944, and in the dive-bombing attack that followed, HMS Bulolo, 1,000 yd (910 m) north of LST-21, received a bomb hit on the forecastle. At 11:20 on 7 June 1944, the LST got underway in convoy for Southampton, arriving at East Solent at 20:55.

Mooring at Southampton on 8 June 1944, LST-21 discharged casualties and loaded 40 vehicles and 146 Army personnel. At 14:45 on 9 June, she was underway in convoy for the "Gold" assault area, arriving off the Normandy coast on 10 June 1944, and underway to "Jig Green" beach at 16:49. Made smoke on red alert and observed considerable anti-aircraft fire and bomb bursts. At 23:34 she retracted from the beach and proceeded to the outbound area awaiting anchorage. Enemy aircraft were active intermittently during the early morning of 11 June 1944, and at 09:35 on that date she joined a northbound convoy for the Thames River.

Arriving on 12 June, she proceeded to the King George Fifth Docks in London and moored to take aboard 31 English ammunition trucks and 131 Army personnel. On 13 June, she moved to convoy anchorage area due south of Southend, England, and at 21:35 was underway in Convoy EWT 8, arriving at the "Gold" assault area at 21:30 on 14 June, proceeding to "Jig Green" beach. At 22:06 she struck a submerged wreck but passed clear and beached at 22:13. LST-338, however, stranded in the same wreck. Red alerts, smoke making and anti-aircraft fire, along with explosions on the beach followed, there being a large fire off the port quarter. Unloading was completed at 00:37 on 15 June 1944, and the LST retracted from the beach and proceeded to the outbound sailing anchorage. A serious vibration on the starboard shaft became apparent. She took the British LCT(K)-514 in tow at 07:10 and took station in an outbound convoy but the vibration cut her speed and she was unable to keep up with the convoy. She proceeded alone at best speed and arrived off Calshot, England, reporting damage and remained anchored from 16 to 18 June, awaiting availability at Southampton Repair Docks.

After being repaired, she remained in service between England and Normandy, making shuttle runs back and forth.

She departed Falmouth, Cornwall, on 30 June, arriving at Seine Bay, France, on 1 July 1944, with Convoy ECM 19. She left Seine Bay, on 2 July, with Convoy FCM 21 which arrived back in Falmouth, 3 July 1944.

She first sailed to Belfast, departing there on 11 May 1945, in Convoy ONS 50 and arrived at Norfolk, Virginia on 31 May 1945. She then proceeded to New York on 1 June 1945, for availability. Departing New York on 13 August 1945, she proceeded to Little Creek, where she remained until 23 August 1945. On 25 August, she arrived at Casco Bay, Maine, and remained there until 4 October 1945, returning to Boston on 6 October. On 1 November 1945, she departed for Hampton Roads, with a load of ammunition. She returned to New York on 14 December 1945, and then sailed for Norfolk, arriving there on 7 January 1946.

=== 1945 convoy duty ===
LST-21 left from Liverpool, on 11 May 1945, as part of Convoy ONS 50 bound for Halifax, Nova Scotia, where she arrived on 29 May.

== Postwar career ==
Captained by Lt. (sr.g.) R. E. Donegan, USCG, LST-21 arrived at Norwalk Harbor for Navy Day celebrations 27 October 1945. The ship arrived on Thursday, 25 October, coming from Casco Bay, Maine, with a crew of 100. The LST made perhaps its last beach landing at Calf Pasture Beach in Norwalk, and over the course of Saturday and Sunday received up to 20,000 visitors.

LST-21 was decommissioned on 25 January 1946, and struck from the Navy list on 19 June 1946. She was sold to Louis Feldman, of Flushing, New York, on 12 March 1948 and was subsequently scrapped.

== Honors and awards ==
LST-21 earned one battle star for her World War II service.

== Bibliography ==
- "LST-21". Dictionary of American Naval Fighting Ships. Naval History and Heritage Command. This article incorporates text from this source, which is in the public domain.
- "USS LST-21". NavSource. 8 April 2011.
- "Convoy UGS.19". Arnold Hague Convoy Database.
- "Convoy BM.74". Arnold Hague Convoy Database.
- "Convoy CJ.9A". Arnold Hague Convoy Database.
- "Convoy MKS.38". Arnold Hague Convoy Database.
- "Convoy MKS.38G". Arnold Hague Convoy Database.
- "Convoy SL 147/MKS 38". Arnold Hague Convoy Database.
- "Convoy ECM.19". Arnold Hague Convoy Database.
- "Convoy FCM.21". Arnold Hague Convoy Database.
- "Convoy ONS.50". Arnold Hague Convoy Database.
- "USS LST-21" (PDF). This article incorporates text from this source, which is in the public domain.
