= Bareboating =

Bareboating is the act of chartering a sailboat that one occupies, navigates, and operates for a vacation from an owner or a charter company. Common bareboating locations are the Caribbean, the Mediterranean and the Whitsundays.

Bareboat charters are distinct from crewed yacht charters, in which a professional captain and crew operate the vessel. In a bareboat charter, the charterer is responsible for navigation, docking, anchoring, and provisioning, and charter companies may require proof of competency such as certification or a sailing résumé.

To charter a sailboat, one must usually be able to demonstrate boat handling skills especially in operating the boat under power, docking, and anchoring. Typical sizes for bareboats come in the range of 30 ft to usually about 60 ft at the upper end. Most charter operators require a sailing resume listing sailing experience, boats that one has sailed and operated, and navigation and racing experience. If the charter operator is not satisfied that one has the appropriate experience, they will often require that the chartering party hire a captain from the charter company to sail with them for a few days. In most traditional charter destinations such as Greece or Croatia the chartering company would ask to see a skippers recognised yachting certificate in order to charter bareboat yachts.

While it is always possible to add extra services to a bareboat rented vessel, it remains fundamental to understand that the term bareboat indicates that the vessel is being offered bare of crew, food and special equipment. The charterer (i.e. the person signing the contract) will rent the sailing boat, motor boat or catamaran, with the dinghy and the fundamental equipment for safe navigation included in the price. The charterer may then be the one responsible for navigation and supplies or ask the charter company to add services such as a skipper, hostess or cook, order also to be supplied with sets of linens, bath towels and beach towels, an outboard engine for the dinghy (which is given with paddles as standard), wi-fi or satellite phone, a grill for outside and many types of water equipment like a kayak, windsurf and S.U.P., but also other services like requesting the provisions for the vacation in advance or a re-fuel service for the return (i.e. the charter company staff will be in charge of filling the fuel tanks again).

The bareboat charter market was established first in 1967 in Tortola by Jack Von Ost, founder of Caribbean Sailing Yachts, who conceived the idea of a fleet made up of similar boats, with a standard for maintenance and equipment and boats especially designed for charter and not private use.

== See also ==
- Bareboat charter
- Yacht charter
- Yacht charter broker
- Luxury yachts
- Skippered charter
- Bareback
