= PocketShip =

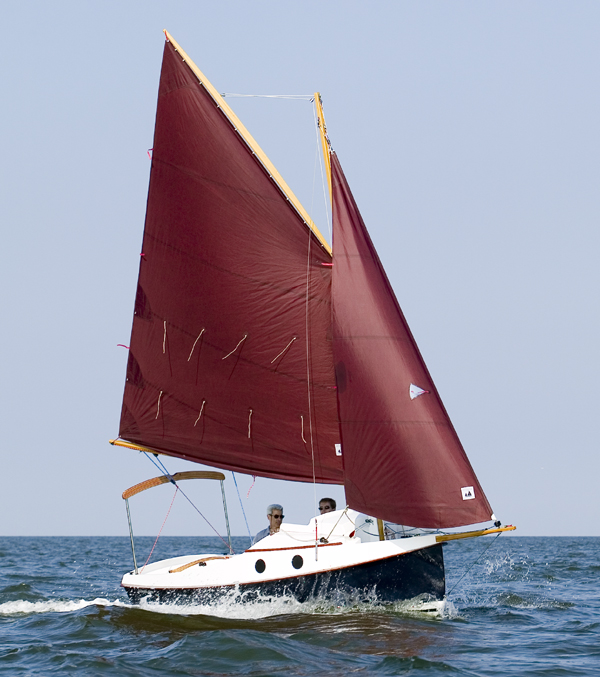

Development
- Designer: John C. Harris
- Location: Annapolis
- Year: 2008
- Role: Pocket cruiser

Boat
- Crew: 1–4
- Draft: 16 inches (41 cm) (rowing); 36 inches (91 cm) (sailing)

Hull
- Type: Monohull
- Construction: Plywood
- Hull weight: 800 pounds (360 kg)
- LOA: 14 feet 10 inches (4.52 m)
- Beam: 6 feet 3 inches (1.91 m)

Hull appendages
- Keel: Keel and centerboard

Rig
- Rig type: Gaff

Sails
- Mainsail area: 109 square feet (10.13 m^{2})
- Jib/genoa area: 39 square feet (3.62 m^{2})
- Spinnaker area: 90 square feet (8.36 m^{2})
- Total sail area: 148 square feet (13.75 m^{2})

PocketShip is a stitch-and-glue pocket cruiser sailboat designed by John C. Harris of Chesapeake Light Craft.

== History ==
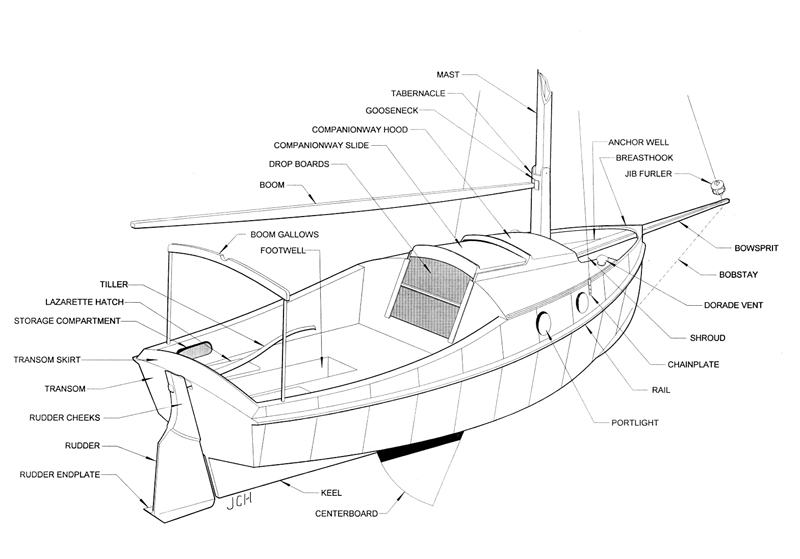
Exterior diagram of PocketShip

The first PocketShip hull was built by Geoff Kerr at Two Daughters Boatworks in Westford, Vermont. Commencing in mid-January 2008, it took Kerr 525 hours to complete the hull and spars. The hull was rigged at Chesapeake Light Craft in Annapolis, Maryland, and launched on May 10, 2008. Sailing trials were completed in various waters from Maine to Maryland with crews of 1–4 adults in winds of up to 20 knots.

As of February 2010, PocketShips have been completed or are under construction in the United States, Canada, France, Australia, and Japan.

== Design ==
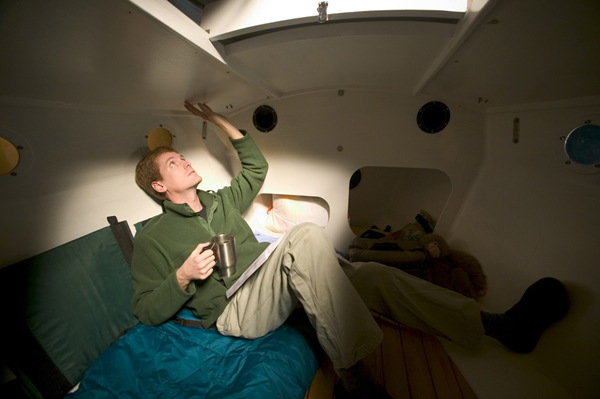
John C. Harris in the cuddy of the first PocketShip

The PocketShip is a "refined model, meant to sail well on all points, provide dry camping accommodations for one or two adults, and tow behind a four-cylinder car." The cockpit was designed for comfortable daysailing and can be used for sleeping if necessary. A portable head stows beneath the cockpit, sliding forward into the cuddy for use.

Auxiliary propulsion can be provided with a pair of oars, a yuloh, or a small outboard motor.

== Rigging ==
PocketShips are single-masted sloops set with a gaff-rigged mainsail and a roller-furled jib. A spinnaker may be set for flying downwind.
