= AAY =

AAY may refer to:

- Aariya language, an apparently spurious language of India
- Aay (film), a 2024 Indian Telugu-language romantic comedy film written and directed by Anji K. Maniputhra
- Aay (king), an early historic south Indian dynasty
- Al Ghaydah Airport in Al Mahrah Governorate, Yemen (IATA airport code AAY)
- Allegiant Air, an airline headquartered in Las Vegas, Nevada, US (ICAO airline designator)
- Down East Yachts, an American sailboat manufacturer
