= Helicat =

Marine vessel

- Type: Recreational watercraft
- Inventor: Sandy Williamson
- Website: helicat.info

The Helicat is a marine vessel designed by Sandy Williamson. The vessel resembles a helicopter cabin on a pair of pontoons or a hybrid of a helicopter and catamaran. This recreational vessel is built to quickly and safely navigate rough waters up to 45 mph on only 4-13 gph, and its design prevents water from storing in the cockpit like conventional vessels.
