= Bareboat charter =

Chartering or hiring of a ship without crew or provisions

A bareboat charter, or demise charter, is an arrangement for the chartering or hiring of a ship or boat for which no crew or provisions are included as part of the agreement. Instead, the renter of the vessel from the owner is responsible for taking care of whatever the agreement specifies – insurance, maintenance, repairs, etc.. The act is commonly known as bareboating or bareboat charter.

There are legal differences between a bareboat charter and other types of charter arrangements, commonly called time or voyage charters. In a voyage or time charter, the charterer charters the ship or part of it for a particular voyage or for a set period of time. The charterer then can direct where the ship will go but the owner of the ship retains possession of the ship by its employment of the master and crew. In a bare-boat or demise charter, on the other hand, the owner gives possession of the ship to the charterer, and the charterer hires its own master and crew. The bare-boat charterer is sometimes called a "disponent owner". The giving up of possession of the ship by the owner is the defining characteristic of a bareboat or demise charter.

== In commercial shipping ==
In a commercial shipping bareboat charter, no administration or technical maintenance is included as part of the agreement. The charterer obtains possession and full control of the vessel, along with the legal and financial responsibility for it. The charterer pays for all operating expenses, including fuel, crew, port expenses and P&I and hull insurance.

A bareboat charter is in effect a financing arrangement. It is generally considered a lease contract, specifically a finance lease, for accounting purposes, under both international financial reporting standards (IFRS 16) and US accounting standards.

== In yachting ==
Although any kind of boat may be bareboat chartered, the term is most commonly heard in regards to recreational yachting. Yacht charter brokers and agent companies, which offer yacht finding and travel organisation services similar to travel agents, maintain inventories of recreational vessels available for bareboat charter.

Bareboat hire has become increasingly common since the mid-1990s, particularly since the early 2000s, as many experienced and semi-experienced recreational sailors consider it easier and cheaper to hire a bareboat at their intended vacation destination than own and maintain their own yacht. Destination bareboat rentals also eliminate the complications and expense of engaging yacht delivery services to bring one's own boat to the sailing grounds, and back – though some adventurous bareboaters prefer to rent a yacht for an entire vacation, including round-trip travel. Further, a bareboat charter allows the rental of a much larger, more comfortable yacht than many avid sailors can afford, well-suited to multi-couple or multi-family vacations.

Both the international leisure travel industry (particularly outdoor activities–based vacations) and the boating industry boomed in the 2000s, further spurring the bareboat charter industry, which suits action vacations. Bareboat chartering is extremely common in the Caribbean, such as the British Virgin Islands, and also in Croatia, which has one of the largest charter fleets in Europe with several thousand registered vessels. Greece also maintains a significant charter market, with more than 2,000 vessels available for hire.

In the United States, when a vessel is "bareboated" for yachting the renter must supply its own captain, who is responsible for the boat and its passengers. One may be hired commercially or selected from among properly qualified member(s) of the party, often referred to informally as a skipper. Appropriate licenses come in two categories: OUPV ("Operator of Uninspected Passenger Vessels”), good for undocumented vessels of 100 tons or less and parties of 6 or fewer; and Master, qualified for craft larger than 100 tons and parties greater than 6. Regardless of the license, any party member accepting the role of captain assumes the legal responsibilities, authorities, and liabilities that inhere with the position. It is critical everyone involved understands this before agreeing to such an arrangement.

== See also ==
- Yacht charter broker
- Luxury yachts
- Yacht charter
- Skippered charter
- Bareboating
- Dry lease
