= Astus 14.1 =

Trimaran dinghy

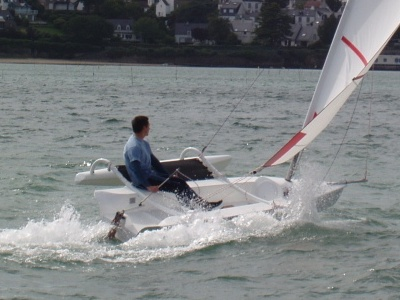
The Astus 14.1

The Astus 14.1 is a 14 ft (4.18m) trimaran dinghy aimed at recreational sailing and racing. The trimaran design is unusual for a boat of this size but is said to combine the features of other types of design: pointing ability of a monohull dinghy (the ability to sail close to the wind), reaching ability of a catamaran (ability to achieve high speeds on a beam reach), and planing ability of a skiff (ability to surf and go faster than the theoretical speed limit of a displacement boat of the same size). The stability provided by the floats makes the boat accessible to beginners and single-handed racers.

== Construction ==
The Astus 14.1 is built in glass-reinforced polyester (GRP) covered with white gelcoat. The cockpit floor has a honeycomb core, offering rigidity and durability.
The floats are mounted on dismountable arched tubes and can be removed for storage. However given that the overall width with floats in space is 2.50m, the boat can be towed on the road with the floats in place.

Cockpit:
The cockpit of the Astus 14.1 is large enough to accommodate two adults, or one adult with two children. The cockpit floor is flat with a daggerboard well. The mainsheet purchase tackle is attached to the aft tube. A small watertight locker is located at the fore end of the cockpit.

Spars:
The Astus 14.1 is equipped with a self-supporting mast for the 6-square metre mainsail version. On the 8-square metre mainsail version the mast is secured by spectra halyards. The mainsail is footed on a boom.

Sails:
The Astus 14.1 is equipped with a full-batten Dacron mainsail which is available in two sizes: 6 square metres for sailing schools and beginners, or 8 square metres for racing, as standard. A furling gennaker mounted on a bowsprit is available as an option.

Trailer:
The trailer offered as an option with the Astus 14.1 is a combination trailer with a launching trolley that can be detached from the road base.

== Suitability for trekking ==
=== Pros ===
- Watertight locker offers storage and protection for personal belongings
- Light weight
- Comfortable sitting position
- Stable and dry

=== Cons ===
- Watch out for the daggerboard when beaching
- Cockpit not large enough for a long trek with two adults

== Specifications ==
Length overall	4.18 m
Beam	2.50 m (including floats); 1.10 m (main hull only)
Weight	60 kg
Draught	0.80 m (daggerboard down)
Sail area	Main: 6 or 8 m^{2} Furling gennaker: 7 m^{2}
Design Category	D: 2 adults
Designer	Stéphan Vallet

== See also ==
- List of multihulls
- Astus 16.1
- Astus 20.1
- Multihull
- Trimaran
- Dinghy sailing
