= Cabo Rico Yachts =

Costa Rican sailboat manufacturer

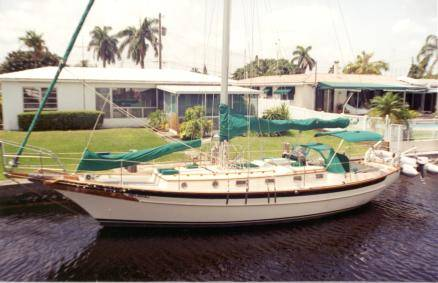
Cabo Rico 38

Cabo Rico Yachts is a small semi-custom manufacturer of fiberglass sailboats located in Costa Rica and designed by W.I.B. Crealock and Chuck Paine. Sizes range from 34 to 56 feet. In 1965, the company started building boats in the corner of a British Leyland assembly plant in the San José area.

== History ==
Cabo Rico Logo

In the 1960s, John Schofield started building power boats in the corner of the British Leyland assembly plant in Costa Rica. In the early 1970s, their first sail boat was a 36-foot ketch designed by W.I.B. Crealock, the Tiburon 36. There was 36 Tiburons built and 10 Tiburon 38s built which became the Cabo Rico 38, under contract for the Ryley brothers. In 1977, the 36-foot design became the now legendary Cabo Rico 38. Some company literature erroneously credited Dennis M. Garrett, general manager of the company Fibro Tecnica S.A., as the designer of the 38. In 1983 a separate company, Cabo Rico USA, Inc., opened in Fort Lauderdale, FL to offer sales of new Cabo Rico boats. 1986 saw the introduction of the Chase 38 sport fishing boat designed by C. Raymond Hunt and Associates of Boston. In 1987, two Canadians, Fraser and Edi Smith, purchased the factory in Costa Rica. They also arranged for a corporation in Ontario, Canada to purchase the sales company in Fort Lauderdale, Florida. First, the new owners introduced the XL version of the 38 and then a smaller 34-foot Crealock designed sistership to the 38 the following year. This was the first new sailboat design in ten years and long anticipated.

The first European dealer came on board in Oslo, Norway in 1988. Other foreign dealers were added over the years in: Antebes France; Osaka, Japan; Toronto, Canada; Port Zelande, the Netherlands; South Hampton, UK; and Istanbul, Turkey. The Cabo Rico 38 Pilot premiered in 1989. They re-introduced the Rhode Island built Cambria 44/46 in 1992 and the Cambria 40 in ‘94. That year also saw the introduction of the Mark Ellis designed, Northeast 37+, later renamed the NE400. It proved to be a very fast motorsailer, under both motor and sail. In 1995, Bill Crealock designed the new Cabo Rico 45, his largest design for the company at the time. Due to a designer conflict with a similar size boat for a competitor, in 1998 Cabo Rico went to Chuck Paine and Associates of Maine for the new Cabo Rico 40. This was later stretched to a 42 footer in 2000. That vessel was named the “ultimate bluewater boat” by SAIL Magazine. That same year the wonderful Cabo 34 was stretched to 36 feet as well. In 2003, the first Paine designed Cabo Rico 56 was launched. Later, that fully loaded, live-aboard yacht would enter the 2005 Trans Pacific race and placed 2nd in PERF class to a 74 footer and be seventh overall into the harbor in Hawaii! 2004 saw the introduction of the very pretty Cabo Rico 42 Pilot and in 2006 the spectacular, Crealock designed, Cabo Rico 47 Pilot based on his 45 design. The market slow down in 2007 and economic collapse of 2008 made it necessary to shut down the Cabo Rico factory in Costa Rica by September 2009 for an extended time. It also ruined Cabo Rico’s plans for its full sales, service and repair facility in Rhode Island that was scheduled for early 2009. The small, three person Florida corporation was forced into Bankruptcy in 2010 and closed, resulting in two lawsuits, one of which was ruled by the court to have no merit and was dismissed, while the other was not pursued. In 2017 market conditions were showing signs of improvement. Facilities will be in a new location in the San Jose Central Valley. 2018 will see Cabo Rico models being built with completely new financial participation and a new management team. The first boat to ship will be a new model, the Northeast 450, a bigger sister ship for the NE400. A Cabo Rico 47 Pilot on the shop floor can be completed and the new 56 Center Cockpit model will go into production.

== Models ==
Cabo Rico produces 34/36, 40/42, 42 Pilot, 45/47, 47 Pilot, and 54/56-foot cruising designs along with Cambria 40, 44, 46, 48 cruiser/racers, Northeast 400 and 450 motorsailers, and Chase 38 Sport fishing yacht.

| Model | Designer | Notes | |
| 56 | Chuck Paine | 56 production to resume | 56 Center Cockpit (new model) |
| 45/47 | William Crealock | Production to resume, has Pilot version | |
| 40/42 | Chuck Paine | Production to resume, has Pilot version | |
| 38 | William Crealock, | Out of production, came in Pilot version | |
| 36 Tiburon | William Crealock | Out of production | |
| 34/36 | William Crealock | Production to resume | |
| NE400 | Mark Ellis | Production to resume | |
| NE450 | Sparkman and Stephens | Production to start, new model | |
| Cambria 40 | | Production by special request only | |
| Cambria 44/46/48 | | Production by special request only | |
| Chase 38 | C. Raymond Hunt & Associates | Production by special request only | |

== Miami Vice ==
In the 1980s TV show Miami Vice, a 38-foot Cabo Rico was used in the pilot episode. The boat was called the St. Vitus' Dance and it was the home of the main character, Sonny Crockett (Don Johnson), and his pet alligator Elvis. The Cabo Rico was only seen in the pilot episode as Elvis was portrayed by a live alligator and the show did not want the cosmetic repair cost. Endeavour sailboats were used for the rest of the show (an Endeavour 40 in season 1 and an Endeavour 42 for seasons 2 to 5), without the live alligator on them.

== See also ==
- List of sailboat designers and manufacturers
- List of boat builders
