= Cascade Yachts =

American sailboat builder

Cascade Yachts was an American builder of fiberglass monohull sloop-rigged sailboats ranging in sizes from 23 to 42 feet (13 m) in length. It was founded in 1954 in Portland, Oregon, by a group of local sailors interested in experimenting with fiberglass sailboat construction.

== History ==
In 1954 the company was launched by five sailors under the name Yacht Constructors. The first design, the 34-foot (10 m) Chinook, came from the desk of well-known Philadelphia naval architect Frederick Geiger, adapted from a wood design. The first five were launched in 1956-1957 to the founders, and began winning local races and gathering attention in the press. Eventually 70 were produced, making it arguably the first production fiberglass sailboat.

Robarta A. Smith, a former Sparkman & Stephens designer, would later design a series of boats for the company:

- Cascade 29 1961 360 were eventually produced.
- Cascade 42 1964
- Cascade 36 1967
- Cascade 23 1977
- Cascade 24 1977
- Cascade 27 1978

Like many early producers of fiberglass boats, the company's production methods resulted in yachts that were heavier than later builders. Experimenting with fiberglass, at that time a relatively novel material for boat construction, the founders made test samples that were shot at from 10 feet (3.0 m) with various firearms to test the material strength. The test samples repelled .45 slugs and became the foundation of the company's reputation for producing bulletproof yachts. In various cases Cascade Yachts have been dropped off slings, fallen off a trailer at highway speed, and submerged in a mudslide, and suffered little consequential damage. Many Cascade hulls were sold in various stages of completion for owners to finish the interiors.

In 1989 the company's assets were sold to a new owner who continued production under the name Cascade Yachts.

In 2007 the company was sold to Russell Mead and moved to Warrenton, Oregon.

== Notable voyages ==
- Walt Wilson, a former police officer, completed a six-year, 40,000-mile (64,000 km) circumnavigation in the Cascade 29 Euphoria.
- Jim and Molly Moore's Cascade 36 Swan did a four-year circumnavigation, detailed in their book "By Way of the Wind."
- Eighty-year-old Josh Taylor completed an eleven-year round the world voyage in the Cascade 36 Comitan.
- A Cascade 42 syndicate from the Portland Yacht Club raced seven consecutive Transpacific Yacht Race, from 1967 to 1979. Their best place was 3rd in 1969, the best time 11 days, 15 hours.
- 64-year-old Ed Hart, on Hooligan, a Cascade 29, completed an unplanned circumnavigation.
- Portland, Oregon based Joby Easton and Bill Huseby sailed Cascade 36 Rain Drop to win their division and claim overall honors in the 2008 Pacific Cup (from San Francisco, California to Oahu, Hawaii), and were also awarded the Navigator's Trophy and the Latitude 38 Performance Trophy.
- AJ Goldman finished after deadline in the 2010 Singlehanded Transpac, in Cascade 36 Second Verse

== See also ==
- List of sailboat designers and manufacturers
