= CW Hood Yachts =

- Industry: Boat Designing and Sales
- Founded: 1991
- Founder: Chris Hood and Chris Stirling
- Headquarters: Marblehead, Massachusetts
- Products: Wasque 26; Wasque 30; Katama 32; Hood 43; Hood 50; CW Hood 32

CW Hood Yachts is a boat builder, designer, and broker in Marblehead, Massachusetts. They produce a range of power and sailing vessels, from the 26 foot Wasque 26 through to the larger Hood 43, along with custom designs.

== History ==
Owners Chris Hood and Chris Stirling founded the CW Hood Yacht Yard out of Chris's uncle Ted Hood's Little Harbor marine complex in 1991. The company moved to its current location in Marblehead, Massachusetts, in the mid-1990s.

== Boats ==
Boats manufactured by CW Hood Yachts include:

- Bremer 25
- Wasque 26
- Wasque 30
- Katama 32
- Hood 43
- Hood 50
- CW Hood 32

CW Hood Yachts also produce Downeast hulls from Jarvis Newman, with sizes ranging from 30 to 46 feet in length, and are authorized builders for the International One Design. Future designs include the Wasque 32.

== Awards ==
CW Hood Yachts received the "Best Powerboat" award at the Newport International Boat Show for the Hood 43 in 2009. In 2011, the CW Hood 32 won "Best Daysailer" from both Sail Magazine's Best Boats 2011 competition and Sailing World's Boat of the Year Awards.

== See also ==
- International One Design
- List of sailboat designers and manufacturers
