= Astus 20.1 =

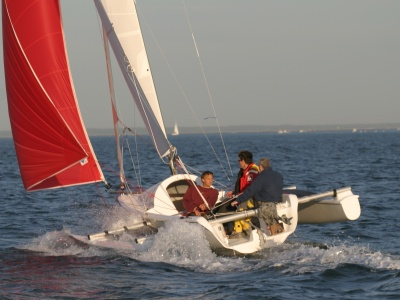
The Astus 20.1

The Astus 20.1, built by Astusboats, is a 20 ft (6.1m) trimaran dinghy aimed at family day sailing, though its cabin offers basic cruising capability. Its multihull design offers speed and stability.

== Construction ==
The Astus 20.1 is built in glass reinforced polyester (GRP) covered with white gelcoat. The cockpit floor has a honeycomb core, offering rigidity and durability. The floats are mounted on telescopic tubes and can be extended or folded on shore or on the water, making it possible to use narrow split ways or monohull marina berths.

Cockpit:
The cockpit of the Astus 20.1 is large enough to accommodate 7 adults. The cockpit floor is flat and free from centreboard well or any other gear. The cockpit coamings offer good protection for children.

Spars:
The Astus 20.1 mast has one pair of spreaders. The main sail attaches to a boom.

Sails:
The Astus 20.1 is equipped with a dacron furling jib and dacron mainsail as standard. The mainsail is fully battened and has one reef as standard, and a second reef can be specified as a factory option. A Pentex jib and mainsail can be specified for enhanced performance. A furling gennaker and an asymmetrical spinnaker are available as options.

Trailer:
The trailer offered as an option with the Astus 20.1 has a split beam and tilting rollers and is fitted with a winch to facilitate launching and recovering. Trailer Sailers are boats small and light enough to be towed by ordinary cars. Their width (beam) is constrained by road regulations. In Europe, to be towable on the road the width of the boat and trailer must not exceed 2.55m. The maximum weight is determined by the towing capacity of the towing vehicle and by the type of driving license. Folding trimarans are particularly well suited as trailer sailers because their narrow width with folded floats makes them towable on the road whilst their wide beam with floats extended makes them stable and safe on the water. Furthermore, the absence of ballast makes them considerably lighter than a keelboat of similar size (375 kg for the Astus 20.1 compared to 1000 kg for a 20 ft keelboat). Heavier boats require a stronger and heavier road trailer, making the towing weight even greater.

== Suitability for trekking ==
=== Pros ===
- Small cabin with good headroom
- Ample storage capacity in cabin and cockpit
- Possibility for portable chemical toilet
- Vast cockpit with coamings offers good protection

=== Cons ===
- Narrow double berth

== Specifications ==
Length overall	6.13 m
Beam	3.88 m (floats extended); 2.53 m (floats folded)
Weight	375 kg
Draught	0.30 m/1.10 m (swing centreboard and rudder)
Sail area	Main: 16.5 m^{2} Furling jib: 6.5 m^{2} Furling gennaker: 20 m^{2} Asymmetrical spinnaker: 24 m^{2}
Max outboard size	6 hp
Design Category	C: 5 people D: 7 people
Cabin	1 double berth 1.10 m x 2.20 m
Designer	Jean-Hubert Pommois

== See also ==
- List of multihulls
- Astusboats
- Astus 14.1
- Astus 16.1
- Multihull
- Trimaran
