= Dragonfly Trimarans =

Dragonfly Trimarans is a line of trimaran sailboats built by the Quorning Boats shipyard in Skærbæk, near Fredericia, Denmark.55°31′11.97″N 9°38′8.08″E

The trimarans produced by this shipyard are characterized by a folding technology denominated "SwingWing". This allows them to use marina berths intended for monohulls and be trailerable. The smallest model, the Dragonfly 25, is narrow enough (2.3m) to not need special permits, as is the Dragonfly 28 (which at 2.54m is just under the 2.55m legal limit in the European Union). These trimarans have low draft and can be beached since both the centreboard and the rudder can be lifted.

== History ==
Quorning Boats was founded in 1967 by Børge Quorning. In 1981 the company dropped the monohulls and started to produce exclusively the Dragonfly range of trimarans. These early trimarans were not foldable. In 1988-89 the “Swing Wing” system was designed and developed. It was first introduced in 1989 in the Dragonfly 800 Swing Wing, and has been used in all models since. In 1995, Jens Quorning, son of the founder, replaced his father at the head of the company. Jens' brother, Eric, runs BSI, a company which supplies parts for Quorning. In total, about 800 boats were produced as of 2007.

== Product line ==
=== Current models ===
- Dragonfly 25. The smallest model, launched in 2016.
- Dragonfly 28. Presented in January 2009 at the boot Düsseldorf Boat Show, Germany. It replaced the Dragonfly 800 but has almost as much interior space as the (also discontinued) Dragonfly 920.
- Dragonfly 32. This model was launched in the Summer of 2012, replacing the old 920. Its production uses new (for Quorning) production technologies like 3D design, a new 7-axis CNC-milling machine process and finite-elements material and stress analysis.
- Dragonfly 36. This model was launched in early 2025, at Boot Düsseldorf.
- Dragonfly 40. Launched in 2020, it replaced the 1200.

Specifications, by model (Touring version)
Model	25	28	32	36	40
Length sailing (m)	7.65	8.75	9.80	11.55	12.10
Length folded (m)	9	10	12	13.43	14.17
Beam sailing (m)	5.80	6.50	8.00	8.12	8.40
Beam folded (m)	2.30	2.54	3.60	3.70	4.00
Draft, board up (m)	0.35	0.40	0.50	0.67	0.70
Draft, board down (m)	1.50	1.70	1.90	2.00	2.20
Weight, ready to sail (kg)	1050	1950	3400	4500	5800
Mainsail (m2)	24	37	48	61	65
Furling genoa (m2)	10	19	26	32.5	33
Code 0 furling (m2)	17	37	57	55	65
Asymmetric spinnaker (m2)	45	65	95	125	110
Bowsprit length (m)	NA	1.60	1.80	0.90	0.75
Water tank (L)	NA	90	120	220	220
Holding tank (L)	NA	60	60	80	75
Payload incl crew (kg)	NA	725	1200	2200	1800

=== Previous models ===
- Dragonfly 600. Small, open trimaran with demountable floats. Only 11 were built before the model was discontinued in 1994, due to it being "too expensive to produce".
- Dragonfly 25 MK 1. Older smaller model, predecessor of the 800.
- Dragonfly 800 MK I. In 1985, Erik Quorning came 1st in the Round Great Britain and Ireland race in one of these boats.
- Dragonfly 800 MK II. A non-swingwing model predecessor of the more recent Dragonfly 800.
- Dragonfly 800 MK III (Swing Wing). This model was introduced in August 1989 and was replaced by the Dragonfly 28 in 2009. There were two versions, Cruising and Racing, differing on the size of mast and sails. About 300 were built. Olympic sailing legend Paul Elvstrøm’s last boat, which he owned for 10 years, was a (modified) DF 800.
- Dragonfly 920. This model existed in two versions: Touring and Extreme. The Extreme version has the same center hull as the Touring, but longer arms and floats making it wider when unfolded, which allows the use of a taller mast and bigger sails. It is approximately 15% faster.
- Dragonfly 35. This model is an offshore and ocean cruiser. It replaced the Dragonfly 1000. As with the 920, two versions exist: Touring and Ultimate. The Ultimate has a taller mast and bigger sails, but the same beam as the Touring version.
Dragonfly 800 in folded position

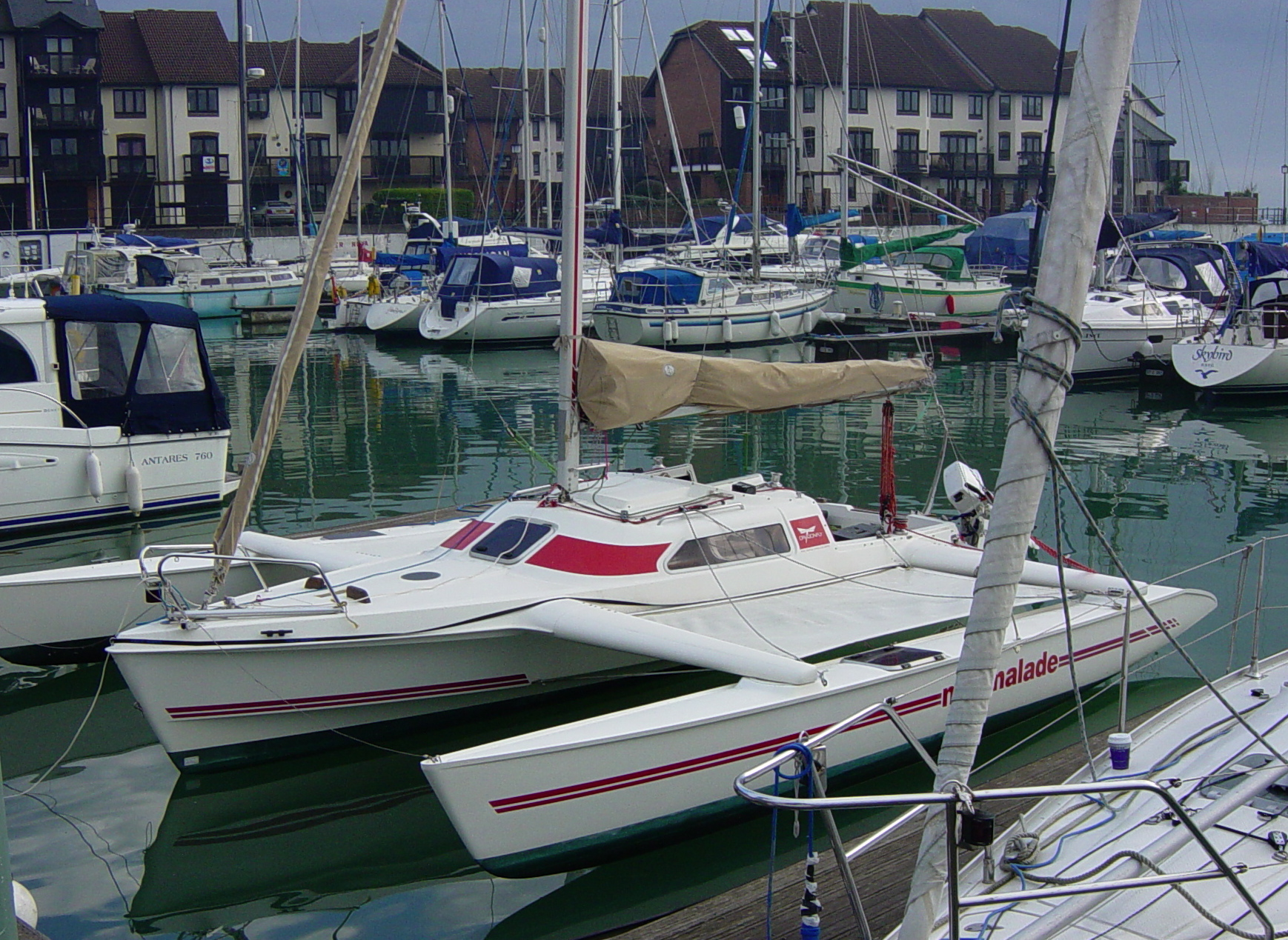
Dragonfly 800 in extended position
- Dragonfly 1000. Replaced by the Dragonfly 35.
- Dragonfly 1200. Replaced by the Dragonfly 40.

== Awards ==
- Dragonfly 1000 - "Boat of The Year 1994" from Sailing and Cruising World magazines!
- Dragonfly 600 - "Boat of the Year 1995" from Sailing World magazine
- Dragonfly 1200 - "Boat of the Year 2001" award from Cruising World magazine
- Dragonfly 1200 - Danish Design Prize 2001
- Dragonfly 920 Extreme - “European Yacht of the Year 2004”.
- Dragonfly 35 Ultimate - “European Yacht of the Year 2008”.
- Dragonfly 25 - Sail’s "Best Boats 2016 award" for "Small cruiser".
- Dragonfly 25 - "European Yacht of the Year 2016".
- Dragonfly 36 - "European Yacht of the Year 2026".
- Dragonfly 36 - "Multihull of the Year 2025", Performance category
- Dragonfly 36 - Sailing World Boat of the Year

== See also ==
- List of multihulls
- Astusboats
- Corsair Marine
