= Bremer 25 =

Sailboat class

Development
- Designer: Mark Bremer
- Location: United States
- Year: 1995
- Builder: CW Hood Yachts/Bremer Marine
- Role: Racer-Cruiser
- Name: Bremer 25

Boat
- Displacement: 3,800 lb (1,724 kg)
- Draft: 6.16 ft (1.88 m) with the lifting keel down

Hull
- Type: monohull
- Construction: fiberglass
- LOA: 25.00 ft (7.62 m)
- LWL: 22.50 ft (6.86 m)
- Beam: 8.00 ft (2.44 m)
- Engine: outboard motor

Hull appendages
- Keel: lifting keel
- Ballast: 1,600 lb (726 kg)
- Rudder: transom-mounted rudder

Rig
- Rig type: Bermuda rig
- I foretriangle height: 31.70 ft (9.66 m)
- J foretriangle base: 8.50 ft (2.59 m)
- P mainsail luff: 30.70 ft (9.36 m)
- E mainsail foot: 11.40 ft (3.47 m)

Sails
- Sailplan: fractional rigged sloop
- Mainsail area: 174.99 sq ft (16.257 m^{2})
- Jib/genoa area: 134.73 sq ft (12.517 m^{2})
- Total sail area: 309.72 sq ft (28.774 m^{2})

The Bremer 25 is an American trailerable sailboat that was designed by Mark Bremer as a racer-cruiser and first built in 1995.

== Production ==
The design was built by CW Hood Yachts for Bremer Marine in the United States starting in 1995, but it is now out of production.

== Design ==
The designer was a business consultant with an MBA, who wanted to design a production sailboat.

The Bremer 25 is a recreational keelboat, built predominantly of fiberglass. The hull and the deck are made from vacuum-bagged biaxal fiberglass with a Core-Cell foam core. It has a fractional sloop rig, a plumb stem, a vertical transom, a transom-hung rudder controlled by a tiller and a lifting keel. It displaces 3,800 lb (1,724 kg) and carries 1,600 lb (726 kg) of lead ballast in a swept bulb on the fiberglass keel.

The boat has a draft of 6.16 ft (1.88 m) with the lifting keel extended and 2.50 ft (0.76 m) with it retracted, allowing ground transportation on a trailer.

The boat is normally fitted with a small 4 to 6 hp (3 to 4 kW) outboard motor for docking and maneuvering.

The design has sleeping accommodation for four people, with a small double "V"-berth in the bow cabin and an aft cabin with a large double berth. The galley is located on the port side just aft of the bow cabin. The galley is equipped with a stove and a sink. The main cabin has two small seats. The stand-up head is located just aft of the bow cabin on the starboard side. Cabin headroom is 72 in (180 cm). The fresh water tank has a capacity of 3 U.S. gallons (11 L; 2.5 imp gal).

The design has a hull speed of 6.4 kn (11.9 km/h).

== Operational history ==
In a 2002 review Quentin Warren wrote in Cruising World, "the Bremer favors the performance end of the pocket cruiser spectrum". In describing sailing it, he wrote, "true to form, the Bremer accelerated well, tracked like a monorail and stood up to any puffs. Response at the helm was instant and refined; reaction to subtle trim, noticeable and attentive. The jib on this boat features roller furling with the unit recessed into the bow, and this keeps the airflow attached down low on what is truly a deck-sweeper of a headsail. A deck-fitted sprit can be deployed from the cockpit by yanking on a clever tackle arrangement; off the breeze we launched an asymmetrical kite from the end of this and charged along in good control."

In a 2010 review Steve Henkel wrote, "...how many 25-foot sleek-looking sport boats do you see with six-foot headroom? Or a double berth big enough to accommodate two full-sized adults? Or an enclosed stand-up head? Or a very deep keel with ballast of 1,600 pounds (42% B/D ratio) massed almost at its bottom? Best features: This boat has enough freeboard to make the cabin quite roomy. With her retractable keel, she shouldn't be too hard to launch and retrieve at a trailer ramp. And her trailer towing weight of just over 5,000 pounds is low enough to permit use of a variety of 20- to 30-year-old full-size cars equipped with towing packages to pull her over the road. Worst features: The forward berth would only be useful for two very small children or one small adult."

== See also ==
- List of sailing boat types
