= Navy lighterage pontoon =

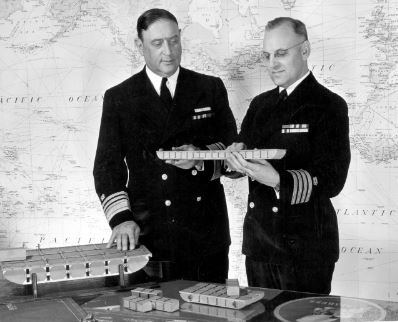
Capt. John N. Laycock CEC discussing his modular pontoon box system with Admiral Moreell CEC.

Seabees unloading ships with pontoons at Lingayen Gulf, Luzon in January 1945

The Navy lighterage pontoon (NLP) was a type of pontoon developed in World War II by Capt. John N. Laycock Civil Engineer Corps (CEC) and used by United States Navy Construction Battalions (Seabees) on invasion beaches and shallow harbors or harbors where the facilities had been destroyed or did not exist. It was referred to as the Seabee's "magic box". It used a Lego-like system of pre-cut pre-drilled angle iron and steel plate and was first assembled into individual boxes that were joined in multiples to construct docks, causeways, barges, dry docks, floating cranes, marine railways or whatever was needed.

Capt. Carl A. Carlson CEC of the War Plans Office came up with the concept of NLPs in 1935, but it was in 1940 that the US Navy looked at the idea more seriously. Development, with testing, began just before the US entered World War II. The Dieppe Raid in early 1942 showed that the idea of seizing a port in the face of modern coastal defences was either costly or impossible. The US Navy saw the vital importance of being able to build their own port facilities and to deploy naval construction units trained and dedicated for just that role. Creating the Seabees addressed that issue. Four battalions were tasked as pontoon battalions and five Pontoon Assembly Detachments (PADs) were formed. The US Army soon followed with their own units.

The Navy Pontoon opened new avenues of attack. The 2 ft × 175 ft (0.61 m × 53.34 m) sections could be carried on sides of Landing Ship, Tanks (LSTs) and could land on shallow water beaches. They also were used to form an easy to assemble "in theater" dry dock. The sections LSTs transported hanging on their sides could be used to form the bottom and sides of a dry dock. They were modified to be filled or pumped dry to sink or float as needed.

Pontoons were used to make support barges for waterfront cranes.

Other barges were motorized, in whatever length and width needed and called Rhinos. The assemblies were nearly unsinkable with the multiple compartments interlocked together. Because they were assembled from standardized pieces they were simple to repair.

Seabees could not do their job until they had equipment ashore. Pontoons were run in front of a LCT or LST or they could ferry from offshore.

== Construction ==
The NLPs were constructed of welded steel flotation units that were assembled like Legos, connected by special angle-iron pieces, called stringers. The flotation boxes and stringers were held together by special iron wedge pins. The flotation boxes came in two types: a rectangular basic unit measuring 5 ft × 5 ft × 7 ft (1.5 m × 1.5 m × 2.1 m). The majority of NLPs were constructed using these. The second type had one side that was curved or angled to make a bow on the front of NLP barges or a ramp as needed.

== See also ==
- Float (nautical)
- Rhino ferry
