= Austral 20 (trailer sailer) =

Type of sailboat

Development
- Builder: Austral Yachts

Boat
- Draft: 0.3 to 1.53 m (0.98 to 5.02 ft)

Hull
- Hull weight: 1,400 kg (3,100 lb)
- LOA: 6.1 m (20 ft)
- Beam: 2.34 m (7.7 ft)

Hull appendages
- Keel: Swing keel
- Ballast: 950 kg (2,090 lb)

Rig
- General: Fractional sloop

Sails
- Total sail area: 16.91 m^{2} (182.0 sq ft)

The Austral 20 is a 20 ft (6.1 m) long keelboat, designed and manufactured in Australia by Austral Yachts in Adelaide.

The boats feature roller reefing jibs and slab reefing mains as standard.

The Austral 20 is a roomy and easy to sail design, for which Austral Yachts won a design award in 1979. The hull is fibreglass construction with built in flotation. The hull contains 68 kg (150 lb) of lead moulded into the keel plus another 145 kg (320 lb) in the plate centreboard.

The cabin is spacious and provides sleeping accommodation for four people with provision for a portable toilet under the vee-berth.
