= Rhino ferry =

Barge made from several pontoons

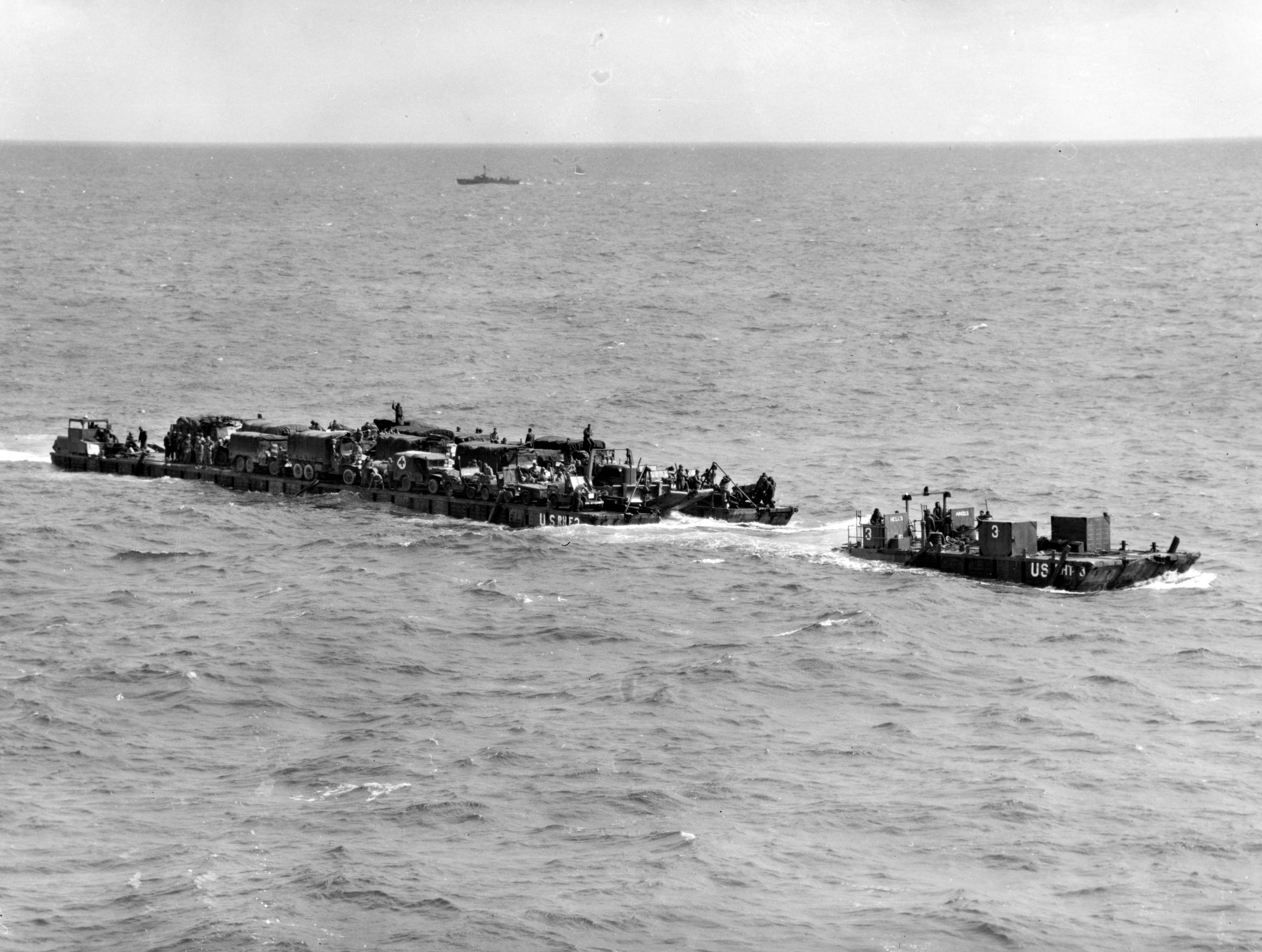
Loaded Rhino ferry towed by a "Rhino tug" approaches a Normandy invasion beach on D-Day

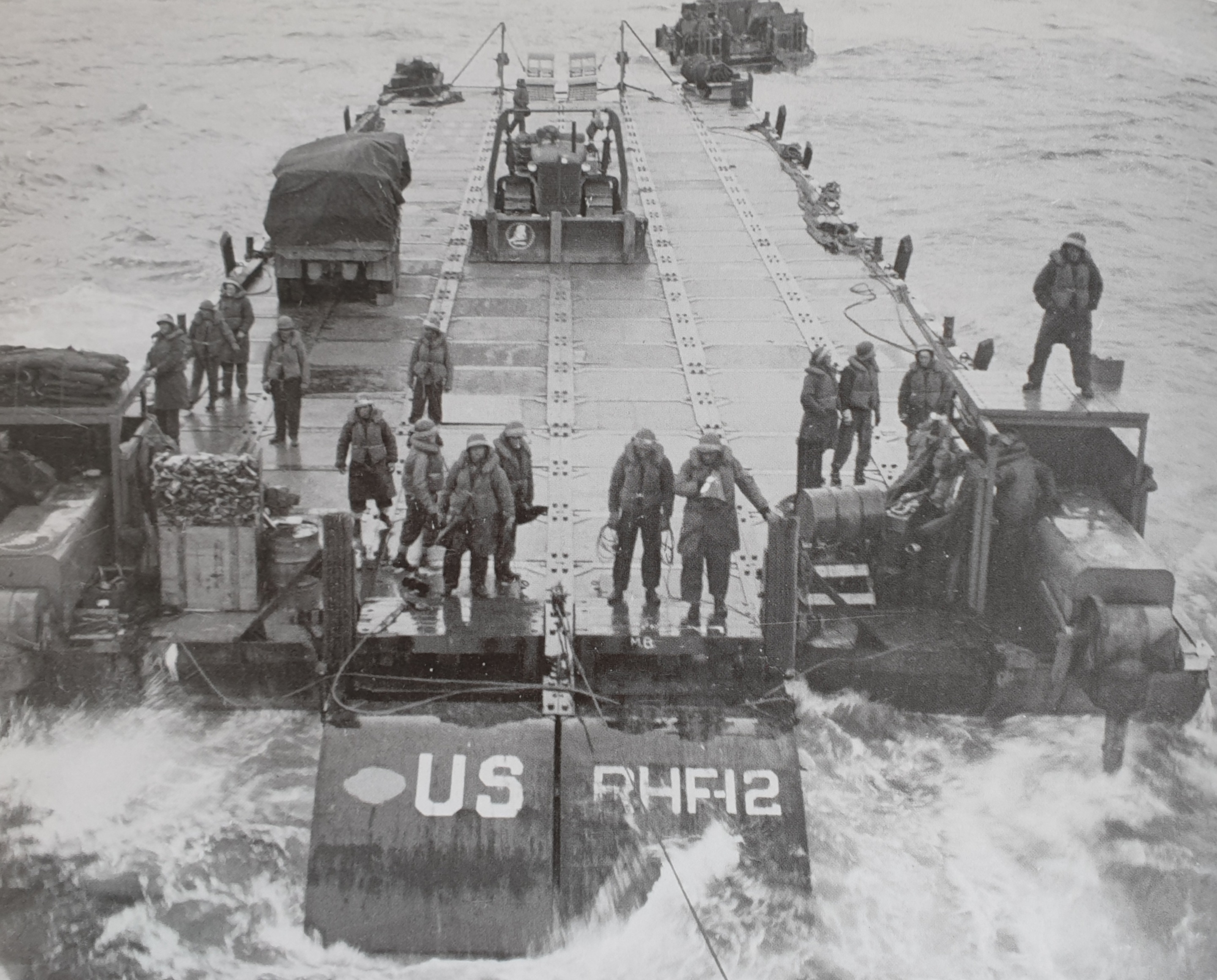
Rhino ferry RHF 12 June 1944

A rhino ferry is a barge constructed from several pontoons which are connected and equipped with outboard engines, used to transport people and heavy equipment. Rhino ferries were used extensively during the Normandy landings and other theaters (Attu, Africa, Sicily, Italy); their low draft was well-suited for shallow beaches, and they could also be used as piers when filled with water. An alternative to tank landing craft, they were operated by United States Navy Construction Battalions. They ferried their cargo from the outlying landing ships to the shore.

For the Normandy invasion, components were shipped from the US. Initial construction in the UK was by the USN Construction battalions. Rhinos (and causeways, which used the same components) were also assembled by British Army Royal Engineers.

== See also ==
- Mexeflote, similar device, 1960s to present day
- Floating battery – Type of heavily armed watercraft
- Barracks ship – Watercraft serving as floating personnel accommodation
- Type B ship – Type of World War II barge
- Navy lighterage pontoon
