= Rosetti Marino =

Rosetti Marino SpA
- Company type: Società per Azioni
- Industry: Heavy Industry Oil & Gas
- Founded: 1925
- Founder: Marino Rosetti
- Headquarters: Ravenna, Italy
- Area served: Energy
- Key people: Oscar Guerra (CEO); Stefano Silvestroni (Chairman)
- Services: Engineering, procurement and construction
- Number of employees: 1200
- Website: www.rosetti.it

Rosetti Marino SpA is the parent company of an industrial group, listed in the Milan stock exchange of AIM Italia Mercato alternativo del capitale and comprising 18 companies, 9 branch offices and 1,200 employees.

== History ==
Established in Ravenna on 1925 by founder Marino Rosetti, the activity of the company began supporting the local port and industrial area with carpentry works and small tanks fabrication.

== 1960s ==
The first offshore natural gas field in Europe is discovered near the Ravenna coast in the Adriatic Sea. A pioneering phase of research and production of hydrocarbons in which Rosetti Marino participates fabricating structures (jackets, decks) for offshore Fixed Platform. The customers are Eni, Agip and Montedison (now Edison (company)).

== Today ==
Rosetti Marino is an EPCI Contractor of offshore and onshore plants for Energy sector, Shipbuilding and Superyachts, as well as in the provision of specialized technical services for the Oil & Gas sector. Rosetti Marino group include other Italian companies involved in its own supply chain and a widespread international presence. The company owns two shipyards in the port of Ravenna, the Piomboni Yard (offshore constructions) and the San Vitale Yard (shipbuilding works) while a third shipyard named KCOI, built in 2008, is located on the Kazakhstan shore of the Caspian Sea near the city of Aktau. The main clients are some of the major international companies and international contractors in the Oil & Gas Energy sector such as ENI, TOTAL, Shell, ConocoPhillips, QatarGas, Premier Oil as well as some of the main European ship owners.
