= Jens Quorning =

Danish multihull designer

Jens Quorning is a Danish multihull designer and head of Dragonfly Trimarans, a position in which he succeeded his father Børge Quorning.

== Designs ==
Partial list.

- Dragonfly 28

== See also ==
- Dragonfly Trimarans
