= Varne =

British Marque of sailing yachts

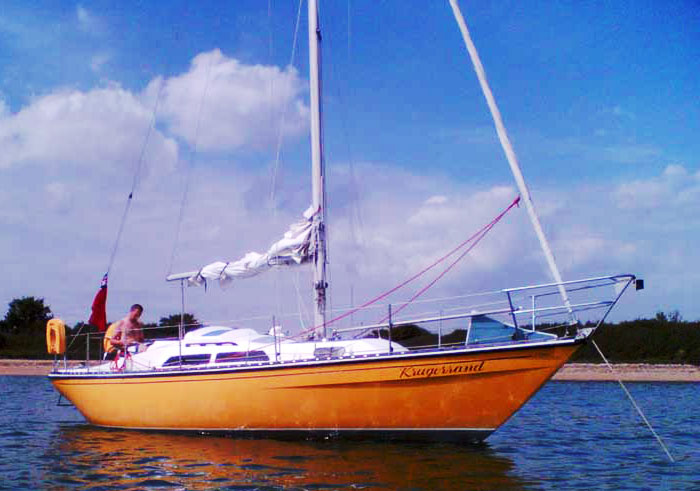
Varne 27 at Anchor off Osea Island, Essex UK

Varne is a British Marque of sailing yacht built in Essex by Varne Marine in the 1970s and 1980s. It is named after the Varne Bank in the Straits of Dover.

== Varne 27, Varne 850 & Weston 8500 ==
The most notable model produced was the Varne 27, designed by Duncan Stuart, and its successors the Varne 850 (a metricised rebranding). In approximately 1980, Weston Yachts purchased the moulds from Varne Marine and produced the Weston 8500; available in Fin, lifting Centreboard or Bilge Keel configurations.

The Varne 27 was described as "the best second hand boat you've never heard of" by Practical Boat Owner Magazine in the year 2000.

In May 2008, Sailing Today magazine described the Varne 27 as "an old school classic in the mould of the Nicholsons, Contessas and Rustlers of her day. She is fast and formidable in a good blow while remaining impeccably mannered. Her motion at sea is supremely smooth, as you'd expect from a deep-veed hull with long overhangs, and she is built to withstand a storm at sea with little consequence"

== Varne Folkboat ==
A Varne Folkboat was also produced and the company also built the MK4 Hurley Silhouette.

== Varne Marine ==
Varne Marine was formed by "energetic entrepreneur" Walter Standing, incorporated 1973 and liquidated in 1986.

== Varne Owners Association ==
The Varne Owners Association, a club for owners of Varne-based yachts was formed in 2005.
