= USS LST-25 =

U.S Navy tank landing ship

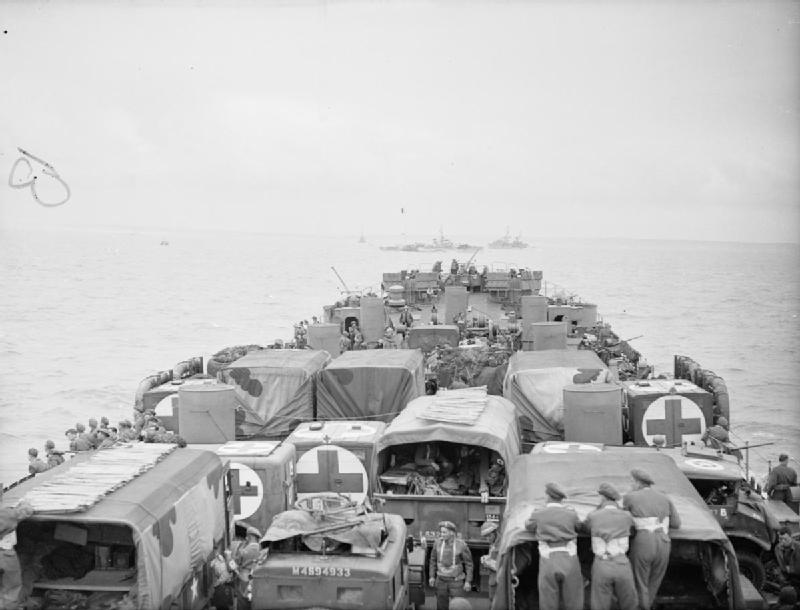
- USS LST-25 during Normandy landings

History

United States
- Name: LST-25
- Builder: Dravo Corporation, Wilmington, Delaware
- Laid down: 12 October 1942
- Launched: 9 March 1943
- Sponsored by: Miss Dolly Hemphill
- Commissioned: 3 May 1943
- Decommissioned: 2 August 1946
- Identification: Hull symbol:LST-25; Code letters:NYZQ
- Honors and awards: 2 × battle stars
- Fate: Sold for scrapping, 31 March 1948

General characteristics
- Class & type: LST-1-class tank landing ship
- Displacement: 1,625 long tons (1,651 t) (light); 4,080 long tons (4,145 t) (full (seagoing draft with 1,675 short tons (1,520 t) load)
- Length: 328 ft (100 m) oa
- Beam: 50 ft (15 m)
- Draft: Unloaded: 2 ft 4 in (0.71 m) forward; 7 ft 6 in (2.29 m) aft; Full load: 8 ft 2 in (2.49 m) forward; 14 ft 1 in (4.29 m) aft; Landing with 500 short tons (450 t) load: 3 ft 11 in (1.19 m) forward; 9 ft 10 in (3.00 m) aft
- Installed power: 2 × 900 hp (670 kW) General Motors 12-567Adiesel engines, 1,700 shp (1,300 kW)
- Propulsion: 1 × Falk main reduction gears; 2 × screws
- Speed: 12 kn (22 km/h; 14 mph)
- Range: 24,000 nmi (44,000 km; 28,000 mi) at 9 kn (17 km/h; 10 mph) while displacing 3,960 long tons (4,024 t)
- Boats & landing craft carried: 2 x LCVPs
- Capacity: 1,600–1,900 st (22,000–27,000 lb; 10,000–12,000 kg) cargo depending on mission
- Troops: 16 officers, 147 enlisted men
- Complement: 13 officers, 104 enlisted men
- Armament: 2 × twin 40 mm (1.6 in) Bofors guns; 4 × single 40mm Bofors guns; 12 × 20 mm (0.79 in) Oerlikon cannons

Service record
- Part of: LST Flotilla Thirty-Five (Asiatic-Pacific Theater)
- Operations: Invasion of Normandy (6–25 June 1944); Okinawa Gunto operation (16–20 May 1945)
- Awards: China Service Medal; American Campaign Medal; European–African–Middle Eastern Campaign Medal; Asiatic–Pacific Campaign Medal; World War II Victory Medal; Navy Occupation Service Medal w/Asia Clasp

USS LST-25 was a United States Navy LST-1-class tank landing ship used in the European Theater of Operations and Asiatic-Pacific Theater during World War II.

== Construction and commissioning ==
LST-25 was laid down on 12 October 1942 at Wilmington, Delaware, by the Dravo Corporation. She was launched on 9 March 1943, sponsored by Miss Dolly Hemphill, and commissioned on 3 May 1943.

== Service history ==
=== 1943 convoys ===
She was first assigned to the Europe-Africa-Middle East Theater. During her transit of the Atlantic, LST-25 was manned by the United States Coast Guard. It is not clear when LST-25 crossed the Atlantic but there are records of some of the convoys that she participated in. She sailed with Convoy KMS 23, in August 1943, during part of its journey from Gibraltar, to Port Said, Egypt, sailing from Oran, Algeria, to Bizerta, Tunisia. She was handed over to a US Navy crew in Bizerte, Tunisia, on 23 August 1943. LST-25 sailed from Algiers, Algeria, to Port Said, Egypt, in October 1943, this time joining with Convoy UGS 19.

She left Bombay, India, 11 November 1943, for Colombo, British Ceylon, arriving on 16 November. At the end of December she left Calcutta, with 11 LSTs headed for Colombo, British Ceylon, arriving 27 December 1943.

LST-25 joined Convoy MKS 38 at Bizerta, Tunisia, in January 1944, as it was en route to Gibraltar, arriving 1 February. Forming Convoy MKS 38G she rendezvoused with Convoy SL 147 and sailed for Liverpool on 2 February, arriving on 13 February 1944.

=== Normandy invasion ===
LST-25 took part in the Normandy landings during June 1944.

=== 1945 convoys ===
LST-25 left from New York City, on 17 January 1945, as part of Convoy NG 484 bound for Guantanamo, Cuba, where she arrived on 23 January. She then left the next day as part of Convoy GZ 117 en route to the Panama Canal Zone and Cristóbal, Colón, where she arrived on 27 January.

=== Okinawa Gunto operation ===
LST-25 was then transferred to the Asiatic-Pacific Theater where she participated with the assault and occupation of Okinawa Gunto during May 1945.

Following the war, LST-25 performed occupation duty in the Far East from September 1945 through March 1946. She was decommissioned on 2 August 1946, and was struck from the Navy list on 8 October 1946. On 31 March 1948, she was sold to the Kaiser Co., Inc., Seattle, Washington, for scrapping.

== Honors and awards ==
LST-25 earned two battle stars for her World War II service.

== Bibliography ==
- "LST-25". Dictionary of American Naval Fighting Ships. Naval History and Heritage Command. 30 July 2015. This article incorporates text from this source, which is in the public domain.
- "USS LST-25". NavSource. 15 August 2014.
- "Convoy KMS.23". Arnold Hague Convoy Database.
- "Convoy UGS.19". Arnold Hague Convoy Database.
- "Convoy BM.74". Arnold Hague Convoy Database.
- "Convoy CJ.9A". Arnold Hague Convoy Database.
- "Convoy MKS.38". Arnold Hague Convoy Database.
- "Convoy MKS.38G". Arnold Hague Convoy Database.
- "Convoy SL 147/MKS 38". Arnold Hague Convoy Database.
- "Convoy NG.484". Arnold Hague Convoy Database.
- "Convoy GZ.117". Arnold Hague Convoy Database.
