= Austral Yachts =

Austral Yachts is a boat builder located in South Australia. Founded in 1972 by Adrian and Sue Keough, the company initially focused on trailer sailers, although they have also made keelboats both as variations of their trailer sailer designs and as independent vessels. The company's original range included the Austral 20, which was granted an Australian Design Award in 1979, the Austral 24, which was designed as a trailerable cruiser-racer, and the Austral 30. Approximately 400 boats were built from these three designs prior to 1994. In the 1990s they started production on the Scott Jutson designed Austral Clubman 8, and this partnership extended to the Super Clubman 30 and the Clubman 36. The company also produces the Farr 42.

== See also ==
- List of boat builders
