= Sailboat design and manufacturing =

This article attempts to give an overview of the design and manufacturing of sailboats and the evolution of this industry. Details should be found and contributed through other/linked pages

== Early sailing vessels ==
Egyptian, Phoenician, Greek and Roman cultures along with prior cultures and their contemporaries used sails as propulsion for commercial and military vessels. However, pleasure craft evolved along with practical craft. Even today some primitive vessels can outsail modern sailing yachts when running before the wind with their standard sails (no spinnakers etc.)

== The first yachts ==
The term "yacht" is a 17th-century English extraction from the Dutch word Jacht; however, royalty and aristocracy enjoyed traveling on the water from time immemorial, with the earliest documentation being in the Egyptian heyday. There is no documentation that these beneficiaries of the enjoyment were participants in the efforts.

The roots of modern yachting come from British royalty, commencing with Charles II when Kings and Princes commissioned relatively small pleasure craft in which they competed.

== Small commercial craft ==
During the era when water-based industries were largely dependent on sailing vessels, speed was a vital element for success. The ability to quickly transport perishable goods to market could make or break a commercial venture. Therefore, the development of a swifter hull or a superior rig could provide a strategic advantage for achieving financial success.

The competition among owners of small commercial craft was the primary driver for advancing upwind sailing technology. Conversely, larger craft were less concerned with maneuverability within harbors or along coastal regions, where the geography of the land made downwind sailing difficult.

The fishing industry and local commercial packets were instrumental in the development of many yachting technologies. Pirates also contributed to the technological advancements, as small, fast, and highly maneuverable vessels proved to be successful for their purposes.

== The Golden Age of yachting ==
The huge wealth accumulated by the commercial upper-class in the late 19th and early 20th century allowed commoners to enter the realm of yachting previously reserved for royalty and the peerage. Americans as well as Britons began to vie for international acclaim. The yacht America burst in on British egos and created a national rivalry, which has now grown to be the America’s Cup.

Wealthy industrialists, including the Vanderbilts and the Liptons, vied with royalty to finance a boom in yachting technology. As the learning curve flattened, others were able to finance yachts as advancements seemed to come from random successes in design and fine tuning.

World War I dampened the growth in yachting, but the 1920s once again brought a heyday of activity and advancement. The production manufacturing capacity and technology created during the war years catapulted the developments in yachting. However, the crash of the international economy at the close of the decade as quickly dampened the demand for large exotic yachts. In order to survive designers and producers had to diversify their efforts and offerings. Once again small commercial craft became the testbeds for technology and the bread-and-butter for the builders in the 1930s. One of the great design teams from this period, Sparkman & Stephens is still influential today.

World War II terminated most direct production of yachts, but the tremendous need for increasingly diverse small naval craft stimulated research and development and increased production capacity for the boating industry. Louisiana based Higgins came up with innovative landing craft, and along with Elco, manufactured the majority of PT Boats. Sparkman & Stephens designed the DUKW an amphibious version of the conventional six-wheel-drive Army truck. Of course, the military had little need of sailboats.

== Fiberglass and yachts for the common man ==
The late 1940s, following World War II, were a time of economic retrenchment, but as the US and international economies boomed in the 1950s the pent-up technology within the boating industry exploded with innovation and production. World War II was the catalyst for development of compact engine systems, mass production of plywood watercraft, and advances in hydrodynamic design. Another outgrowth of war production was fiberglass; the first fiberglass boats were made in the 1930s, but practical production did not begin until the 1950s and then more as a supplement to wood and plywood than as a structural component.

While the 1950s was a test bed for early fiberglass techniques, the early sixties were when the benefits became directly available to the average sailor, as the fiberglass industry began to mature from one-up to assembly lines and standardization. There was an explosion of entrepreneurial expression in the first half of the sixties, which leapfrogged year after year. Each season brought more options and larger boats to the common man, almost analogous to the rapid expansion of the personal computer in the 1990s. Soon a middle-class family could add a 30-foot sailboat to their Plymouth and hamburger budget.

Some of the prevalent brands in the 1960s were Cal, Coronado, Columbia, C&C, Morgan and Pearson; most of these were outgrowths of entrepreneurial venture. But even large companies such as AMF and Chrysler were making boats. Today's big manufacturers are led by people with their roots in 1960s venture.

However, by the late 1960s there was market saturation and entrepreneurs sold into conglomerates or otherwise merged their efforts. The mid-1970s saw an increase in interest in sailing as oil prices began to climb following the 1973 Oil Embargo; however, with petroleum as a major component for plastic resins manufacturing costs also increased. In early designs the solution to engineering problems was frequently: just add more fiberglass. The early boats were sturdy but heavy. Many of the vessels produced during this time frame are afloat today, and several models still enjoy solid sales demand and exhibit excellent sailing characteristics.

With the increase in materials costs, engineering to a finer standard became critical for financial success. This was a double-edged sword as boats became lighter, but in some cases they became weaker. Also, some manufacturers turned to less expensive plastics and a form of hull decomposition known as blistering became prevalent.

The economic downturn of the early 1980s reduced demand for sailboats, while manufacturers increasingly competed with the used boat market. Since fiberglass doesn't rot or rust, twenty years of high production had left a huge inventory of boats, and in many areas the number of boats exceeded the marina space to house them.

The boats of the 1960s and 1970s were substantially extensions of classic hull designs which evolved in wood and were influenced by the early rules of racing. There was an emphasis on shorter waterlines at rest that would expand dramatically when the boat heeled (leaned). This had to do with the rules of racing, where the boat's handicap was not based on actual performance, but on design attributes.

Modifications of racing rules and changes in consumer demand have influenced recent boat designs. There is also a polarization, where racing boats are more distinct from cruising boats.

Current racing rules for most club racers are PHRF (Performance Handicapped Racing Fleet) rules. The philosophy of PHRF is to have a simple single number handicapping system which looks to the performance of a boat model over time for a given region, but allows for adjustment to an individual boat based on options and/or modifications. This adjustment allows for easy comparison of performance between two boats of differing types and speeds over a defined race course to determine which boat was "faster", by penalizing the time of the boat that failed to sail closest to the theoretical performance of the boat. What we consider long lean classic proportions of the boats of the early 1900s were design exercises to maximize ratings under the racing rules of the era. Later rules like IMS created boats that were more rounded in the middle to maximize their rating rules. Now modern racing rules like ORC and particularly Offshore Racing Rule (ORR) result in boats that tend to seek optimum performance over rating games with the hull and rig design.

Boats tend to fall into the categories of (1) racer, (2) racer-cruiser, (3) cruiser-racer, and (4) cruiser; however, there is much subjectivity in the definitions and classifications. Cruising is sailing for the enjoyment of sailing and to reach destinations. Frequently cruisers spend much more time enjoying the amenities of their boats than the sailing aspects, so creature comfort is important. A large pure cruising boat would be likely to have solar panels, wind generated electricity, multiple heads (bathrooms), a complete galley (kitchen), comfortable cabins and even laundry facilities. Many cruiser designs are cutter rigged meaning they carry two headsails, and many have a second mast (mizzen), in the yawl or ketch configuration. Having more sails allows for having smaller individual sails; on a pure cruiser the boats do not change directions frequently, so manipulating multiple sails is not a factor.

Virtually all racing boats today are sloop rigged, which means that they carry one headsail and a mainsail, both from the same mast. Two very large sails mean more work to hoist and handle, but when changing direction, there is less work to be done and it can be done faster; however, sometimes with great effort using massive winch systems. The interiors of serious race boats are often stripped bare, with the head being a bucket.

Most cruising boats are produced in large factories; most racing boats are produced in smaller lots by specialty shops or under contract with larger producers. Frequently the name of a race boat is that of the designer not the producer; in some cases, multiple manufacturers have produced the same design either at the same or different times.

The majority of market share for production cruising boats is divided among Beneteau, Catalina Yachts, and Hunter Marine. Beneteau has a bit more emphasis on speed; Hunter focuses more on amenities; and Catalina falls in between. Catalina tends to have long-running models of boats which evolve over time, but this allows for the development of "one design" fleets, where Beneteau and Hunter tend to change their designs frequently addressing the demands of the market. Both strategies have been successful for the staying power of these three brands.

There is also a strong demand for more specialized cruising boats with a wide range of producers. These boats offer features such as center cockpit, deck salon, pilothouse, cutter rigs, mizzen masts etc. The cabin detail and systems in Beneteau, Catalina and Hunter boats is comfortable but basic; more expensive boats offer a wide range of quality in the woodwork, cabinetry, upholstery, and systems. There are also structural improvements beneath the surface and qualitative benefits in systems as the cost of the boat increases. A top-of-the-line cruiser could cost three times the price of a Beneteau, Catalina, or Morgan. The price may not be justified for bay cruising, but heavier shrouds, a thicker mast, and a stiffer hull could be priceless in a force 8 gale.

== See also ==
- Boat Building
- List of sailboat designers and manufacturers
