= Down East Yachts =

Down East Yachts (USCG Manufacturer's Identification Code (MIC) - AAY) was a manufacturer of sailboats that was headquartered in Santa Ana, California.

== History ==
According to United States Coast Guard records, the company was founded on August 5, 1974, and went out of business on July 12, 1983. The company was founded by Bob Poole, who had previously worked for Columbia Yachts. The company began production in 1974 and, after the death of the founder on April 29, 1978, the company's molds were sold to Newport Offshore Yachts.

The heart of a sailboat company is the design of its boats. Down East Yachts started with a single boat, the Downeaster 38 which was designed by Henry Morschladt, a California naval architect who specialized in cruising sailboats. The design was traditional, with a wineglass stern, full keel, and bowsprit. Subsequent boats were modifications of this original design.

In addition to manufacturing its own boats, Down East Yachts was contracted to finish several hulls made by Westsail when the company ceased operations in 1980.

== Sailboats ==
Four sailboats were manufactured by the company. All were heavily built cruisers suitable for blue water sailing and were available in Ketch, Schooner, and Cutter configurations:

- Downeaster 32, 1975 - 1980.
- Downeaster 38, 1974 - 1981.
- Downeaster 41, 1980 - 1981.
- Downeaster 45, 1977 - 1981.

Downeaster 45 Hull number 1 in schooner configuration

== Trawlers ==
Down East Yachts acquired the molds and tooling for the Defever 40 Passagemaker from Jensen Marine when they ceased operations in 1980. Production was resumed as the Downeast 40.

== See also ==
- List of sailboat designers and manufacturers
