= Astus 16.1 =

Boat

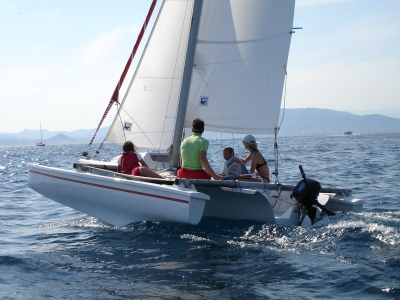
The Astus 16.1

The Astus 16.1 is a 16 ft (5.1m) trimaran dinghy aimed at family day sailing. Its design has been optimised for simplicity of use: the traditional centreboard on the main hull has been replaced by foils built in each float (see picture).

== Construction ==
The Astus 16.1 is built in glass reinforced polyester (GRP) covered with white gelcoat. The cockpit floor has a honeycomb core, offering rigidity and durability.
The floats are mounted on telescopic tubes and can be extended or folded on shore or on the water, making it possible to use narrow split ways or monohull marina berths.

Cockpit:
The cockpit of the Astus 16.1 is large enough to accommodate 5 adults. The cockpit floor is flat and free from centreboard well or any other gear.

Spars:
The Astus 16.1 is equipped with a rotating mast without spreaders. The main sail is loose-footed (no boom).

Sails:
The Astus 16.1 is equipped with a dacron furling jib and dacron mainsail as standard. The mainsail is fully battened and has one reef as standard, and a second reef can be specified as a factory option. The jib comes quite low on deck and can obscure forward visibility. A clear PVC window in the jib is available as a factory option. A furling gennaker is available as an option.

Trailer:
The trailer offered as an option with the Astus 16.1 has a split beam and tilting rollers and is fitted with a winch to facilitate launching and recovering.

== Sailing categories ==
The Astus 16.1 falls into the following sailing categories:

=== Dayboat ===
Dayboats are boats of small to medium size aimed at short sailing trips in inland or coastal waters. They are sometimes equipped with a cabin of moderate size, making sleeping possible for weekend trips. The cabin of the Astus 16.1 is too small to accommodate a berth but provides useful storage for personal belongings and sailing gear.

=== Trailer sailer ===
Trailer Sailers are boats small and light enough to be towed by ordinary cars. Their width (beam) is constrained by road regulations. In Europe, to be towable on the road the width of the boat and trailer must not exceed 2.55m. The maximum weight is determined by the towing capacity of the towing vehicle and by the type of driving license.
Folding trimarans are particularly well suited as trailer sailers because their narrow width with folded floats makes them towable on the road whilst their wide beam with floats extended makes them stable and safe on the water. Furthermore, the absence of ballast makes them considerably lighter than a keelboat of similar size (240 kg for the Astus 16.1 compared to 800 kg for a 16 ft keelboat). Heavier boats require a stronger and heavier road trailer, making the towing weight even greater.

== Suitability for trekking ==
=== Pros ===
- Small cabin offers storage and protection for small children
- Light weight
- Vast cockpit and trampolines

=== Cons ===
- No cockpit locker

== Specifications ==
Length overall	5.10 m
Beam	3.70 m (floats extended); 2.50 m (floats folded)
Weight	240 kg
Draught	0.25 m (no centreboard, built-in foil on each float)
Sail area	Main: 11.7 m^{2} Furling jib: 5.5 m^{2} Furling gennaker,15 m^{2}
Max outboard size	4 hp
Design Category	C: 3 people D: 5 people
Designer	Stéphan Vallet

== See also ==
- List of multihulls
- Astus 14.1
- Astus 20.1
- Multihull
- Trimaran
