= Caribbean Sailing Yachts =

Caribbean Sailing Yachts (CSY) is a company which built heavy-displacement recreational sailboats built during the 1970s and 1980s in Tampa, Florida. CSY was one of the first companies to recognize the impending growth of the Caribbean charter industry and although the company went out of business in the early 1980s, the well-founded boats have continued to sail the world's oceans for the past four decades. CSY's unique script logo was imprinted on a brass companionway medallion, dishware, and trailerboard design.

The CSY boats were sold directly from the factory, without any dealerships or middle-men. Two books were published showing all stages of construction. These books, entitled CSY Guide to Buying a Yacht, were used as the primary means of promotion. One 168-page soft-cover book was published in 1977. A shorter 138-page version was republished in 1979. CSY also used a film strip, plant tours, boat shows and trial sails as sales tools. CSY published a 38-page soft-cover CSY Charter Manual (1979).

== Introduction ==
Caribbean Sailing Yachts Corporation began as a charter company operating in the Caribbean. They were the first company to come up with the concept of charter ownership, pioneered by CSY founder and owner Dr. John Van Ost, a New Jersey dentist with a love of sailing. CSY developed and perfected the "charter lease back" program. In this program, an individual purchased the yacht and subsequently placed it into the charter fleet to cover the cost of the initial payments.

Prior to the end of CSY, Dr. Van Ost envisioned the timeshare concept. He aimed to build the Corsair 81 mega yacht (considered mega in its day). These yachts would be available to multiple people to rent with crew. CSY originally purchased boats from companies such as Irwin. However, chartering demanded stronger boats to withstand bare-boat charter with less experienced captains and crew.

CSY went into the boat manufacturing business, working initially with Ted Irwin, a well-known and successful designer of affordable cruising and racing sailboats in Tampa. Irwin heavily influenced the CSY 44 hull design. From 1975 to 1980, CSY built boats of between 33 and 44 feet (13 m). They were similar in their appearance and hull shape. The 44-foot (13 m) designs feature a raised aft deck allowing for a large aft stateroom. CSY boats were built to unusually high standards of strength, durability, and quality consistent with Lloyd's design and boat building requirements.

Although many of these new boats were purchased outright by their new owners, most, particularly the 44 walk-over model, were sold under an agreement that the boat would be in charter, run by the CSY Charter Company for a number of years, after which the boat would be paid off and revert to the "original purchaser". This system is a typical arrangement with many boats under charter even today. It is known as the "charter lease back" and is used by such companies as the Moorings and Sunsail.

CSY 44s were built with either a deep or shallow draft. Deep-draft models were designed so that their draft could be modified and permanently changed to shoal draft. This enabled the same boat to initially be used as a deep-draft vessel in the Caribbean under charter, and then returned to their owner who could then make the draft modification so the boat could be cruised on the East Coast, the shallow Florida Keys, or the Bahamas.

CSY developed several models including a 33, two layouts of a 37, the popular 44' "Walkover", a 44' "Walk Through", a 44' pilothouse, and a special purpose sailing / fishing vessel known as the Bottomliner.

== Construction ==
The CSY line was well-designed. Features like a built-in full-size trash receptacle in the galley, large refrigeration boxes (three boxes totaling 21 cubic feet (0.59 m^{3}) on the CSY 44 WO), and a larger-than-king-size bed in the aft master cabin (CSY 44) made the boat comfortable in port as well as a good sea boat.

CSY did not use wood lamination in its construction, a technique that is the curse of many boats of this vintage. The CSY hull is up to 1.5" of solid fiberglass reinforced plastic resin with 14 dual layers (one sheet of fiberglass mat and one sheet of fiberglass weave = one layer). The avoidance of wood cores extends to the deck, which is also solid fiberglass. The only wood used in the construction of these boats are heavy laminated structural stringers, bulkheads and interior furniture.

== CSY models ==
CSY developed a full line of sailboats: the 33, the 37, the Carib 41, and the 44, of which two configurations were constructed i.e. the "walk-over", and the Pilothouse Ketch. Most of the 44s built were walk-overs, with a spacious cockpit and separate, unconnected staterooms forward and aft. Only much later did CSY build the 44 "walk-through" model, and only about 40 of these were built before CSY went out of business.

=== CSY Carib 41 ===
The Carib 41 was the first production model destined for CSY's new charter bases in Tortola and St. Vincent and the Grenadines. Designed by Alan Gurney, a total of 30 were built between 1970 and 1973.

=== CSY 44 ===
==== Walk-Over 44 ====
This model is referred to as "walk-over" because one has to walk up to the cockpit from the main salon and then down to the separate aft cabin.

- LOA: 44 ft 0 in (13.41 m)
- LWL: 36 ft 4 in (11.07 m)
- Beam: 13 ft 4 in (4.06 m)
- Draft (shoal): 4 ft 11 in (1.50 m)
- Draft (deep): 6 ft 6 in (1.98 m)
- Ballast (deep): 12,000 lb (5,400 kg)
- Ballast (shoal): 10,000 lb (4,500 kg)
- Disp (deep): 33,000 lb (15 t)
- Disp (shoal): 31,000 lb (14.1 t)
- Sail area: (100%) 906 ft^{2} (84.2 m^{2})
- Mast above water: 55 ft 0 in (16.76 m)
- Mast above water (tall mast) 63 ft 0 in (19.20 m)
- Fuel: 100 US gal (380 L)
- Water: 400 US gal (1,500 L) in two separate tanks
- Original engine: Perkins 4-154 diesel
- Cabin headroom: 6 ft 7 in (2.01 m)
- Designers: Frank Hamlin, Peter Schmitt

The CSY 44 WO is typically what one thinks of when someone mentions a CSY. This is due to its use as a charter boat in the Caribbean in the late 1970s and early 1980s.

==== Walk Through 44 ====
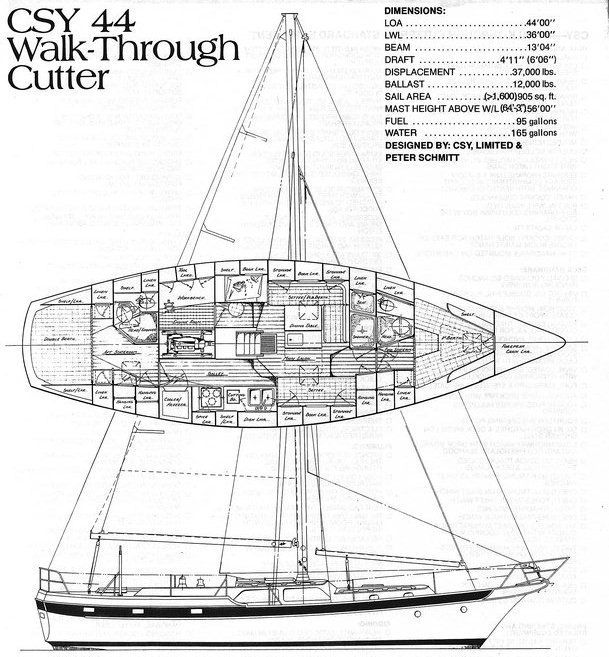

About 41 of these were built, with the last boat being number 42, completed outside the yard.

- LOA: 44 ft 0 in (13.41 m)
- LWL: 36 ft 4 in (11.07 m)
- Beam: 13 ft 4 in (4.06 m)
- Draft: (deep) 6 ft 6 in (1.98 m), (shoal) 4 ft 11 in (1.50 m)
- Ballast: (deep) 12,000 lb (5,400 kg), (shoal) 10,000 lb (4,536 kg)
- Disp: (deep) 38,000 lb (15,000 kg), (shoal) 36,000 lb (14,100 kg)
- U/W Hull Area: (shoal) 578 ft^{2} (53.7 m^{2})
- Sail area: (short 100%) 906 ft^{2} (84.2 m^{2}), (tall 100%) 1050 ft^{2} (98 m^{2})
- Mast top above DWL: (short) 55 ft 0 in (16.76 m), (tall Kenyon mast) 63 ft 0 in (19.20 m)
- Ballast/Disp: 0.32 (shoal), 0.36 (deep)
- Disp/Length: 288 (shoal), 307 (deep)
- SA/Disp: 14.7 (shoal), 14.1 (deep)
- Fuel: 95 US gal (360 L) - single aluminum tank under companionway ladder
- Water: 165 US gal (625 L) - in five fiberglass main cabin tanks, one under each settee, three under floor-one under table and two small ones beside mast
- Original engine: Perkins 4-154 or Westerbeke (British Leyland) W-60, 62 horsepower (46 kW) diesel originally had Walther V-Drive later eliminated
- Cabin headroom: 6 ft 7 in (2.01 m)
- Designers: Frank Hamlin, Peter Schmitt

The CSY 44 Walk Throughs were built late in the production run and are sought after boats, mainly because of their walk-through configuration. While this design sacrifices some cockpit space in order to add the below-decks walkway from the main salon to the aft master stateroom, it is seen by many as a fair trade. It has a comfortable, conventional cockpit with ample room for guest visiting. There are two longitudinal bench seats long enough for sleeping and an ample bench seat aft of the central binnacle. Other layout differences from the Walk Over include a stand-up engine room with workbench to port, a main cabin navigation station/table to port, the galley with side-loading refrigerator/freezer aft located in the starboard passageway leading aft, and all-oak instead of teak interiors. Many of these boats were outfitted with a large fiberglass box on the stern deck suitable for fuel and gas storage. The after section of the main cabin coach roof is raised, adding headroom below and increasing visibility through four large windows.

Many Walk Throughs were delivered with shoal draft and tall mast. The normal rig configuration was a cutter, with a few rigged as cutters/ketches. All of the WT masts were in the cutter position, and if a ketch, a mizzen would be added onto the aft deck with the boom extending far astern.

==== CSY 44 Pilothouse ====
- LOA: 44 ft 0 in (13.41 m)
- LWL: 36 ft 4 in (11.07 m)
- Beam: 13 ft 4 in (4.06 m)
- Draft (deep): 6 ft 6 in (1.98 m)
- Draft (shoal): 4 ft 11 in (1.50 m)
- Ballast (deep): 14,000 lb (5,400 kg)
- Ballast (shoal): 12,000 lb (4,500 kg)
- Disp (deep): 38,000 lb (15,000 kg)
- Disp (shoal): 37,000 lb (14,100 kg)
- Sail area: (100%) 954 ft^{2} (88.6 m^{2})
- Mast above water: single spreader rig only, 58 ft 9 in (17.91 m)
- Water & fuel: 5 tanks available with an option for 6th. The tanks were 100-125 US gallons each and could be configured to carry fuel or water.
- Original engine: Perkins 4-154 diesel or 4-236, (many have been repowered with different engines
- Cabin headroom: 6 ft 7 in (2.01 m)
- Designers: Frank Hamlin, Peter Schmitt

This version of the CSY was delivered as a true ketch, which has the main mast moved forward 4 feet (1.2 m) from the cutter position of the other rigs. This true ketch rig was the only rig available on the Pilothouse 44. No staysail.

==== CSY 44 Bottomliner ====
Only six of the Bottom Line 44s were actually built. Only five actually saw service and were used in the CSY sponsored fishing school. The boats were sold to investors who then leased them back to CSY for use in the commercial fishing school. One of the inducements to attend the fishing school was that if a student went through the school and then captained one of the vessels for five years, the captain would then be eligible to buy the vessel at salvage value. This model was a CSY 44 hull and rigging modified to be a bottom fishing vessel. The idea was that the owner/fisherman could use the sail to help defer the cost of fuel when fishing. The original idea of the vessel was to have a large fish hold centered in the boat, with a crew compartment forward, a captain's quarters aft, and work center in the tall pilothouse. This commercial pilothouse provides a good visible with navigation counter, resting berth, and galley-sliding doors either side. A shaded area was built over the fish hold; side decks are continuous, with no steps or raised section aft.

The CSY Bottomliner was an excellent fishing platform for the grouper snapper fishery; it would fish in much heavier seas and at much greater depths than the standard vessels of the time. It was rigged with six large commercial bottom fishing reels called "bandits", for use in the grouper/snapper fishery. The vessels had all the latest electronics of the time, including dual marine FM radios and a single side band radio for long distance over the horizon communication. It also had multiple fish finding equipment, a whiteline recorder, and a color video recorder. The Bottomliner also had the latest in navigation with LORAN C, which would allow getting back to productive spots within about 100'. The boats were also equipped with radar as an aid to navigation.

The ice hold was equipped with large eutectic refrigeration plates that allowed ice to be kept in the five large bins on either side of the center line of the vessel for standard ten-day fishing trips. The hold also had a large freezer for storage of bait. This arrangement of ice and refrigeration only required running the diesel for approximately two hours a day to maintain temperatures in the hold, further saving on fuel and ice costs. Typically only about three tons of ice was needed for a 10-day trip, as opposed to the six to ten tons that a standard vessel typically required. Fuel was a major cost factor for the standard grouper snapper vessels. The standard diesel driven vessels of the time could use as much as 500 to 1000 gallons on a ten-day trip whereas the CSY typically used about 50 gallons and rarely used more than 100 gallons of its 500-gallon tankage. This pushed the break-even point down substantially, and increased profits proportionately.

These six fishing vessels were caught up in CSY's demise in 1981, and remained tied up to the docks in St. Petersburg for an extended period of time, suffering neglect and deterioration.

==== Cygnet 44 ====
During the fifth year of manufacturing the CSY 44 in its various versions, the CSY Yacht Corporation came out with a new concept to reduce the cost of the yachts. This new version was marketed as the CYGNET 44 line. Shortly thereafter, the CSY Yacht Corporation went out of business. This must have happened in 1981. The CYGNET 44 WT was introduced at the Fort Lauderdale Boat Show in 1980. The Cygnet did not have the trademark CSY hull ports on its bow.

=== CSY 37 ===
The CSY 37 is an aft cockpit model with a roomy interior. It was built to the same high standards of construction as the CSY 44.

- LOA: 37.2 ft (11.3 m)
- LOD: 37.2 ft (11.3 m)
- LWL: 29.2 ft (8.9 m)
- Beam: 12.0 ft (3.7 m)
- Draft: 6.2 ft (1.9 m)
- DraftMin: 4.7 ft (1.4 m)
- Displaces: 19,689 lb (8.931 t)
- Ballast: 8,000 lb (3.6 t)
- Sail Area: 610 sq ft (57 m^{2})

=== CSY 33 ===
Class overview
- Name: CSY 33
- Builders: Caribbean Sailing Yachts

General characteristics
- Class & type: CSY 33 sailing yacht
- Tonnage: 15,200 lb.
- Length: 33 ft 4 in (10.16 m) LOA, 25' LWL
- Beam: 11 ft (3.4 m)
- Draft: 4 ft (1.2 m) shoal / 5' deep draft
- Installed power: Diesel engine (alternator and batteries)
- Propulsion: Sail (538 sq ft) and diesel engine
- Sail plan: Cutter rig
- Ballast: 5,000 lb.
- Fuel: 50 US gal (230 L)
- Water: 150 US gal (490 L)

The CSY 33, designed by P. Schmitt, was the smallest CSY hull put into production. Like all CSYs it is a sturdily built boat that exhibits many of the CSY distinctive touches such as the scroll work on the bow. The CSY 33 was produced from 1979 to 1982. The 33 had a "pilothouse-style" main saloon, but did not have an inside steering station.

=== Gulfstar CSY 50 ===
This boat is often confused with the other CSYs on the market; however, it has no relationship to the CSY company.

== CSY history ==
Caribbean Sailing Yachts, Ltd. was unable to find a manufacturer who would build sailing yachts to the high standards it required for its charter service; therefore, C.S.Y. Yacht Corporation was founded by Caribbean Sailing Yachts, Ltd.'s chief executive officer, John R. Van Ost, on September 1, 1976.

At the start of 1976, a new plug and mold was built, and the first boat went into the water on January 15, 1977. Production gradually increased to seven CSY-44s per month by May of 1977.

Along the way, another version of the CSY-44 was designed and built. The CSY-44 Pilot House Ketch was introduced at the fall boat shows.

A CSY-37 was designed, built, and shown for the first time at the Miami Boat Show in 1978. This was subsequently redesigned into two models, the two-stateroom model, and the one-stateroom model.

In the fall of 1978, the CSY-33 was introduced at Annapolis.

== Fate ==
It is said that CSY was a victim of building their boats too well, and that the business failed because the cost of the boats was too high for the price being asked. Some say this was due to their view of the business. Apparently the company viewed boat production simply as a means to supply their charter fleet in the Caribbean. CSY was not able to maintain this business model. Since their main customer was lease back for their charter business, the closing of tax loopholes most likely contributed to or accelerated their demise.

Antigua Yachts, under the ownership of John Coats, purchased the CSY molds and boats in progress and started building the CSY 44 again, under the new name of Antigua 44. It is said that 20-30 of these highly customized versions of the CSY 44 walk-through were built in the 80s. Many of these boats had teak interiors versus the white oak or Formica interiors of the earlier CSYs. Antigua only made a few of these boats before going out of business, thus ending the CSY line of sailing yachts.
