= Float (nautical) =

Pontoon, an airtight flotation device

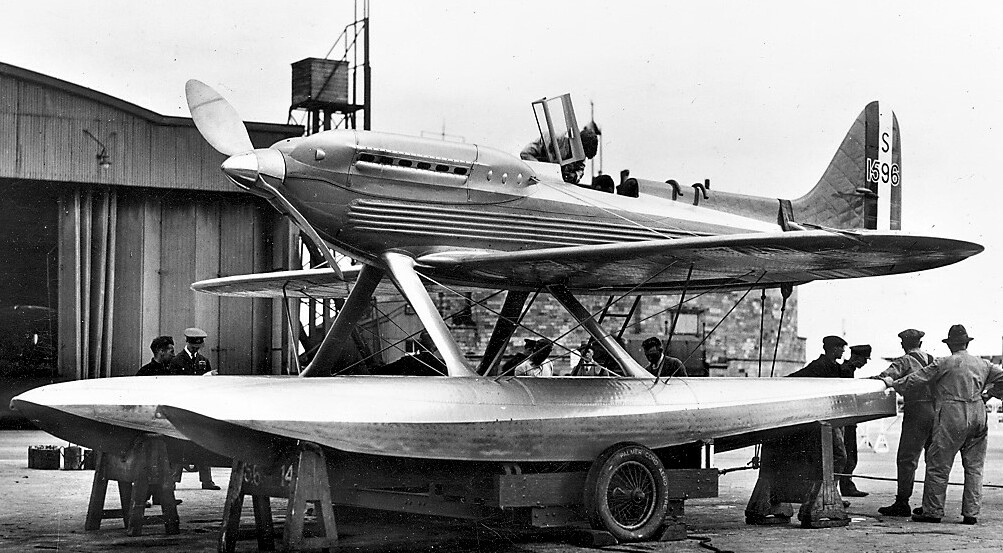
The British racing floatplane Supermarine S.6B (1931), sporting a pair of streamlined floats

A float (also called a pontoon) is an airtight hollow structure, similar to a pressure vessel, designed to provide buoyancy in water. Its principal applications are in watercraft hulls, aircraft floats, floating piers, aquaculture, pontoon bridges, and marine engineering applications such as salvage.

== Applications ==
Floats make up the multipart hulls of catamarans and trimarans and provide buoyancy for floatplanes, seaplanes and houseboats. They are used in pontoon bridges, floating piers, and floats anchored to the seabed for recreation or dockage. They are also used in shipbuilding and marine salvage, often deployed uninflated and then pressurized to raise sunken objects. In military applications, floats are used as pontoon bridges or transportation platforms for heavy vehicles or machinery.

In popular usage, the term pontoon can refer to any of several of the following objects that make use of nautical floats.

=== Pontoon boat ===
A pontoon boat is a flattish boat that relies on nautical floats for buoyancy. Common boat designs are a catamaran with two pontoons, or a trimaran with three. In many parts of the world, pontoon boats are used as small vehicle ferries to cross rivers and lakes.

=== Floating dock ===
A floating dock, floating pier or floating jetty consists of a platform or ramp supported by nautical floats. It is sometimes joined to the shore with a gangway but can be laid out the whole way from the shore to the end. This type of pier maintains a fixed vertical relationship to watercraft secured to it.

Platforms supported by floats are used as floating commercial docks and work areas.

=== Anchored platform ===
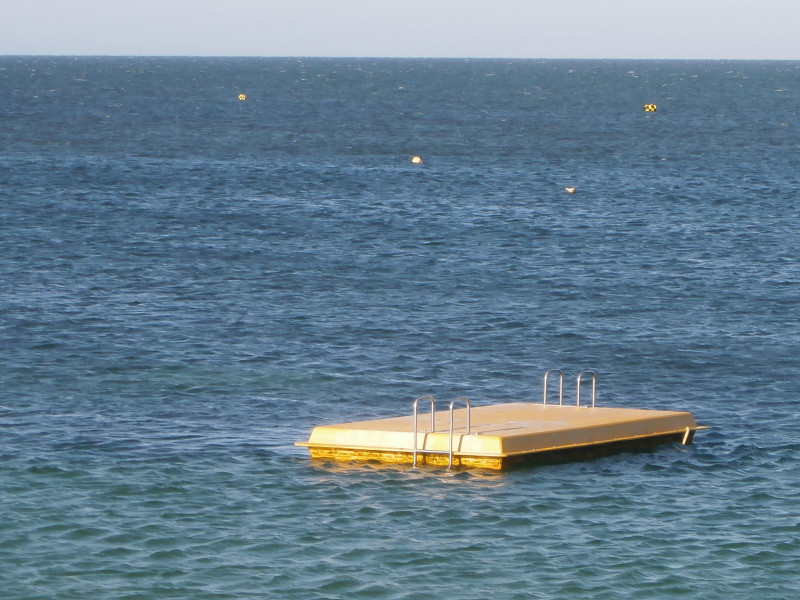
An anchored platform supported by floats

Small, anchored platforms supported by floats are used for diving, swimming to and from, and other recreational purposes. Most familiarly, they are anchored seasonally at beaches and lake shores, or year-round where weather permits. They are variously supported by foam-filled plastic floats, closed cell foam, or air-filled vessels (such as used 55-gallon drums). Known as "swim floats" in North America, they are known simply as "pontoons" in Australia and New Zealand.

=== Salvage pontoon ===
A salvage pontoon, sometimes known as a lift bag, is a pontoon used to raise a sunken watercraft, or provide additional buoyancy. Salvage pontoons can be either flexible and inflatable, or a fixed size. Usually cylindrical in shape, they can be used either in a ship's internal spaces, or externally. In addition to raising sunken vessels, they are also commonly used for long tows, for providing buoyancy to cables and so on.

=== Pontoon bridge ===
A pontoon bridge (also known as a ponton bridge or floating bridge) uses floats or shallow-draft boats to support a continuous deck for pedestrian and vehicle travel. Most, but not all, pontoon bridges are temporary, used in wartime and civil emergencies. Seattle in the US and Kelowna in British Columbia, Canada are two places with permanent pontoon bridges, see William R. Bennett Bridge in British Columbia and these in Seattle: Lacey V. Murrow Memorial Bridge, Evergreen Point Floating Bridge and Homer M. Hadley Memorial Bridge.

=== Floatplane ===
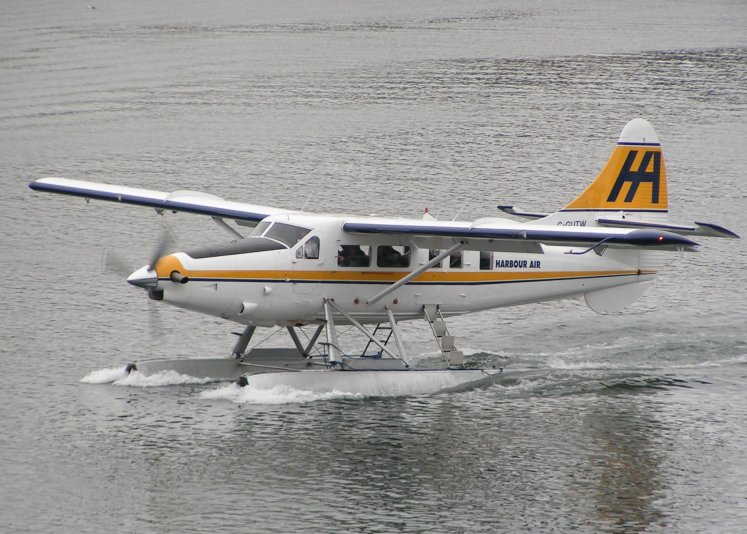
Floats in use on a floatplane

A floatplane (float plane or pontoon plane) is a type of seaplane with one or more floats mounted under the fuselage to provide buoyancy. Floats are streamlined to be both hydro- and aerodynamic.

=== In aquaculture ===
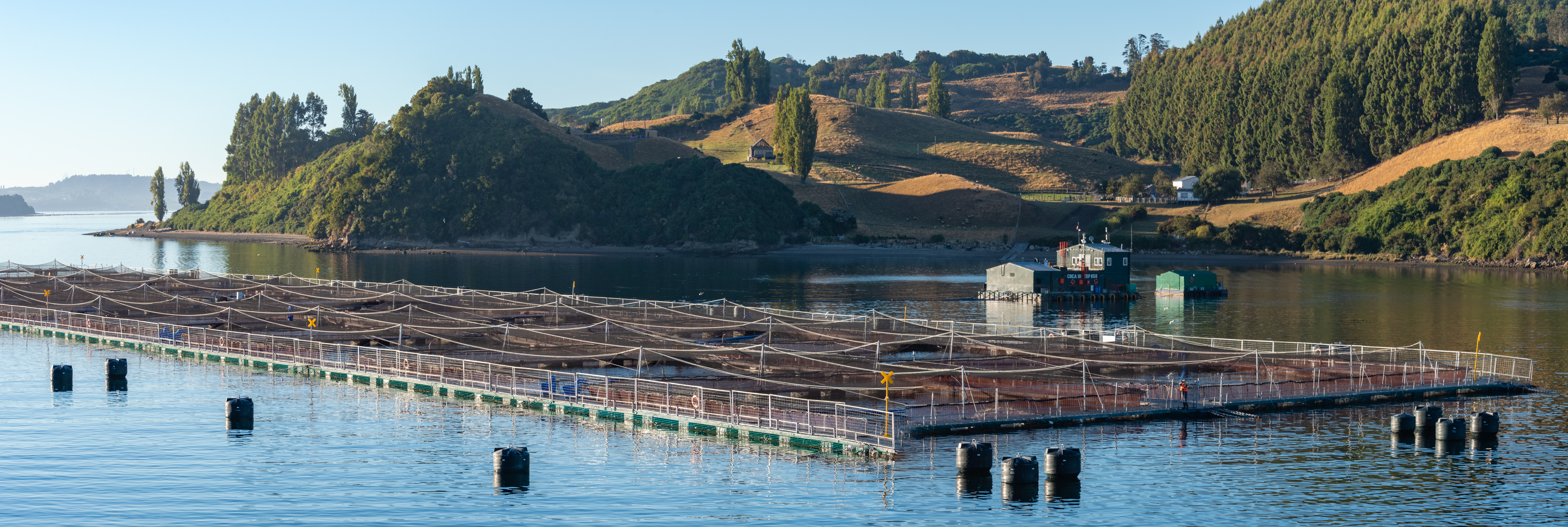
Aquaculture fish farming in the fjords south of Castro, Chile

Various forms of floating platforms, tanks, growing cages, and work areas are used in aquaculture, all employing some form of artificial buoyancy generically known as "floats".

=== Construction ===
Pontoons for marine industrial uses are usually fabricated from steel. Pontoons as parts of watercraft and aircraft are more typically molded in glass-reinforced plastic. Other techniques include those of traditional wooden boatbuilding as well as plywood over wooden ribs or metal sheets over metal ribs (aluminium or steel), reflecting the prevailing practice in aircraft and boats. In most cases, the decking surface on top of the pontoon is made from glass-reinforced plastic (GRP) or composite lumber. In model building, floats can easily be carved out of solid blocks or laminated sheets of foam.

== Gallery ==
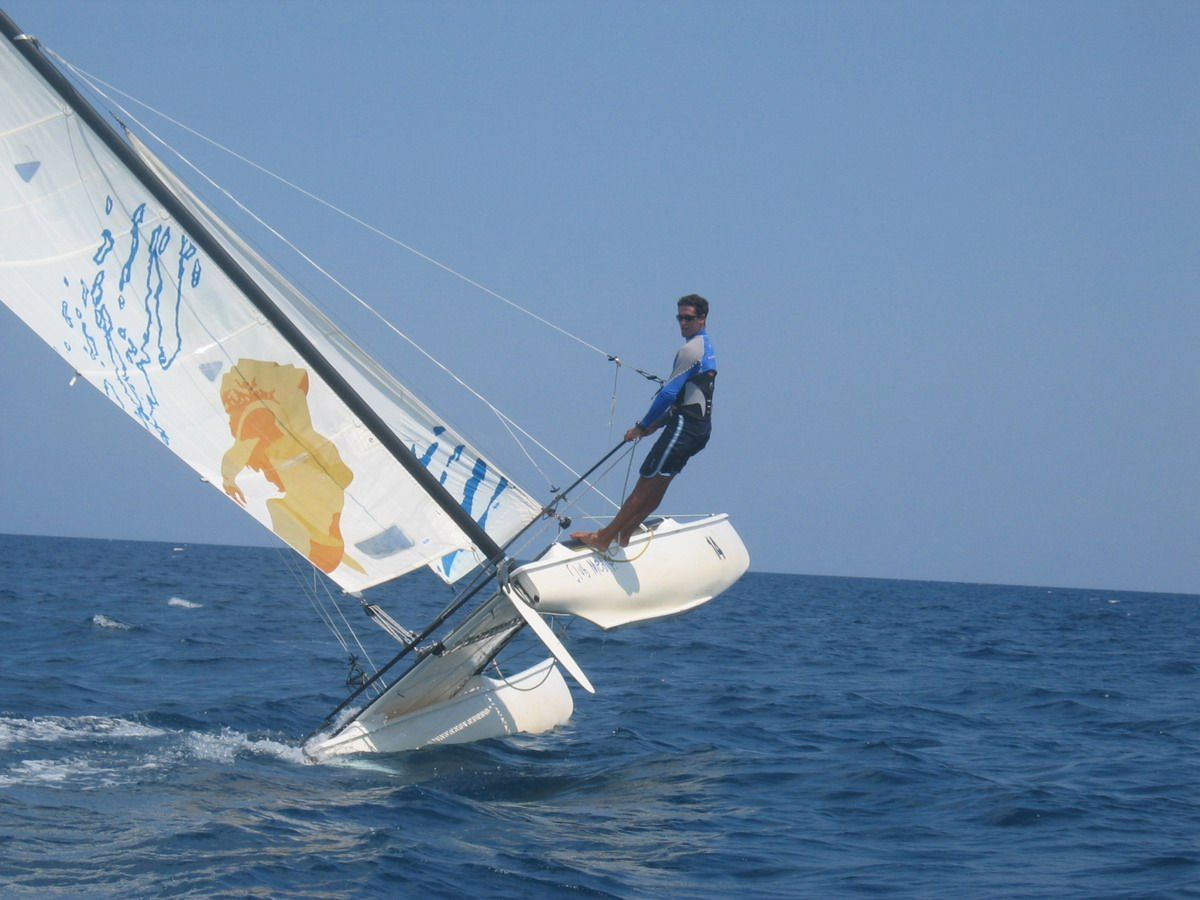
Small open catamaran

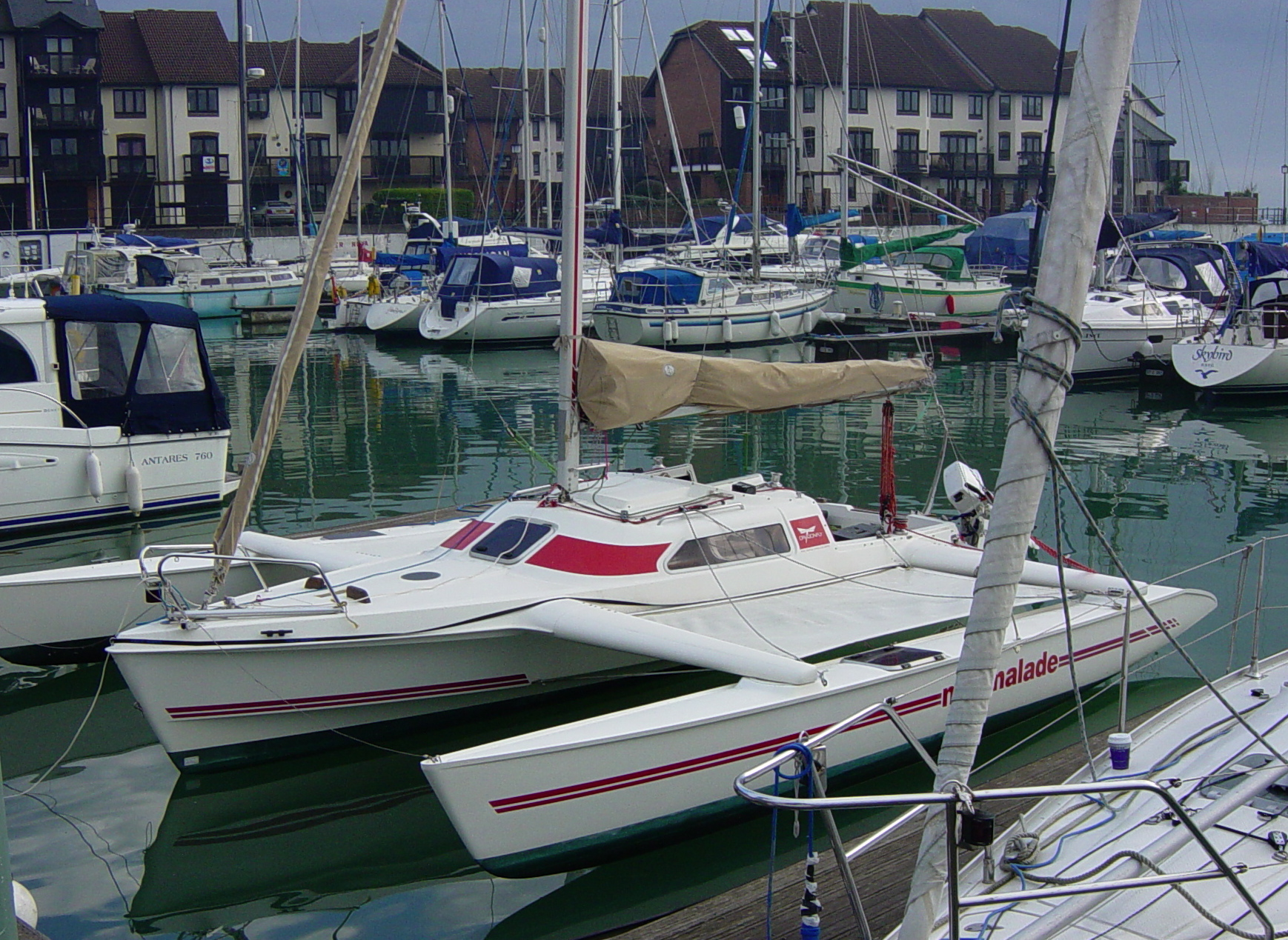
Foldable trimaran with the floats in extended position

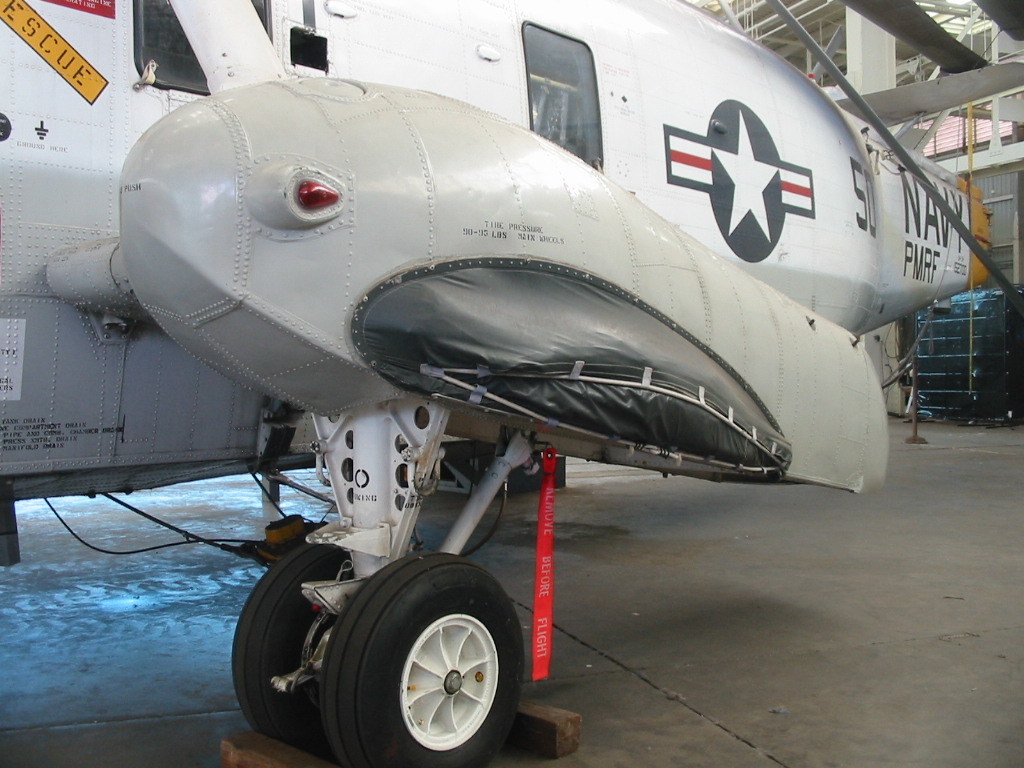
A helicopter pontoon that may be augmented by an inflatable emergency pontoon shown in black

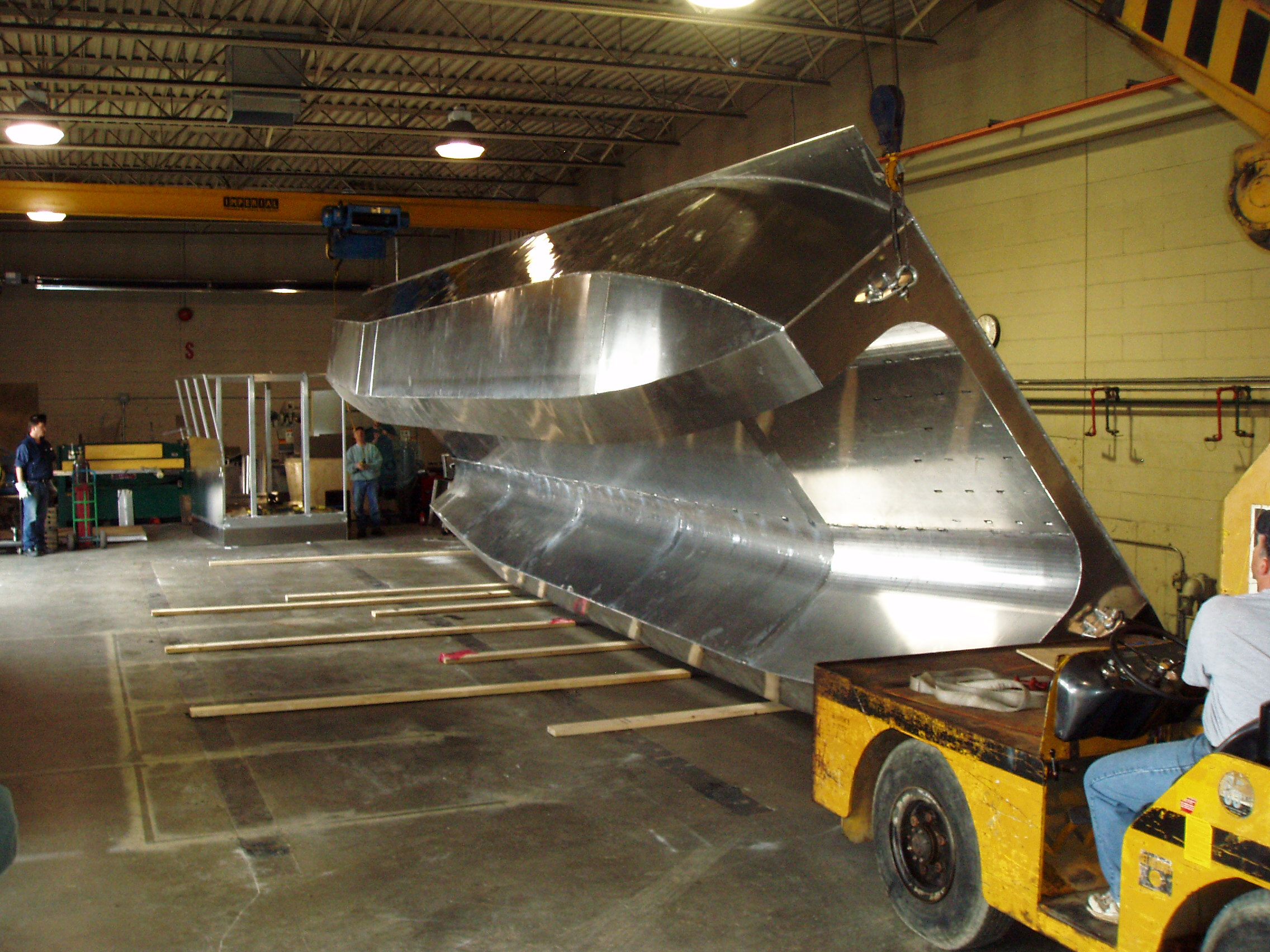
The underside of a pontoon boat during construction

Good Hotel -A hotel built on a pontoon made of concrete and moored in London, England

== See also ==
- Buoy
- Caisson (lock gate)
- Navy lighterage pontoons
- Outrigger
- Raft
- Rhino ferry
- Semi-submersible platform
