= Harry Sindle =

American sailor (1929–2020)

Personal information
- Full name: Harry Robert Sindle
- Nationality: American
- Born: 14 October 1929 Little Falls, New Jersey, U.S.
- Died: 24 April 2020 (aged 90) Gloucester, Virginia, U.S.
- Height: 173 cm (5 ft 8 in)
- Weight: 74 kg (163 lb)

Sailing career
- Sport: Sailing
- Club: Lavallette Yacht Club
- Class: Flying Dutchman
Medal record
Sailing
Representing United States
Pan American Games
Gold medal – first place	1959 Chicago	Flying Dutchman

Harry Robert Sindle (14 October 1929 – 24 April 2020) was an American sailor, sailboat designer, and sailboat builder. He was a six-time national champion in the Flying Dutchman class, won a gold medal at the 1959 Pan American Games, competed in the 1960 Summer Olympics, and designed many types of sailboats.

== Life and career ==
Sindle was born in 1929. He was raised in New Jersey. He graduated from Rutgers University, where he studied mechanical engineering.

Sindle competed in international boat races with sailboats including Lightnings, Thistles, Comets, and Flying Dutchmen (all one-design dinghies). He was a six-time national champion in the Flying Dutchman class. Sindle competed for the United states at the 1959 Pan American Games, where he won a gold medal in the Flying Dutchman class. He went on to compete at the 1960 Summer Olympics in Rome, Italy. Sindle sailed in the two-person Flying Dutchman event alongside Robert Wood and placed nineteenth.

In 1963, Sindle moved to Gloucester, Virginia, to work with Roger Moorman. Moorman designed and built the Mobjack sailboat design. Sindle designed several sailboat classes for the Mobjack Manufacturing Company. Mobjack Manufacturing Company was purchased by Browning Arms Company, where it was renamed Newport Boats and later Gloucester Yachts. Sindle designed sailboat classes such as the Blue Crab 11, Skipjack 15, Newport 17, and Holiday 20. He later built the Buccaneer 18.

Sindle died in April 2020 at the age of 91 and had Parkinson's disease.

== Sailboats designed ==
- Nomad 20 (first built in 1959)
- Skipjack 15 (first built in 1965)
- Surprise 15 (first built in 1969)
- Blue Crab 11 (first built in 1971)
- Scout 11 (first built in 1971)
