= Quickstep (disambiguation) =

Quickstep is a light-hearted dance of the standard ballroom dances.

Quickstep, quick-step, or quick step may also refer to:

== Music ==
- Quickstep (album), album by Kenny Barron
- Quickstep music (disambiguation):
  - Music for the ballroom dance of quickstep
  - Quickstep (march music), lively style of the American march music

== Ships ==
- American sailboats:
  - Quickstep 19
  - Quickstep 21
  - Quickstep 24
- Schooner Quickstep, American sail schooner, 1889
- Quickstep (steamboat), American steamboat

== Other ==
- Soudal Quick-Step, cycling team
- Operation Quickstep, deployment of the Australian Defence Force resources during the leadup to the 2006 Fijian coup
- Quick Step (video game)
