= Gloucester 18 (Whitecap) =

Sailboat class

Development
- Designer: Harry R. Sindle
- Location: United States
- Year: circa 1974
- Builder: Lockley-Newport Boats/Gloucester Yachts
- Role: Day sailer
- Name: Gloucester 18 (Whitecap)

Boat
- Displacement: 760 lb (345 kg)
- Draft: 5.00 ft (1.52 m) with centerboard down

Hull
- Type: monohull
- Construction: fiberglass
- LOA: 18.00 ft (5.49 m)
- LWL: 16.50 ft (5.03 m)
- Beam: 6.58 ft (2.01 m)

Hull appendages
- Keel: centerboard
- Ballast: 125 lb (57 kg)
- Rudder: transom-mounted rudder

Rig
- Rig type: Bermuda rig

Sails
- Sailplan: fractional rigged sloop
- Total sail area: 176.00 sq ft (16.351 m^{2})

The Gloucester 18 (Whitecap) is an American trailerable sailboat that was designed by Harry R. Sindle as a day sailer and first built about 1974.

== Production ==
The design was built between about 1974 and 1984 by Lockley Newport Boats in the United States as the Whitecap or Whitecap 18, and later, when the company name was changed to Gloucester Yachts, the boat was renamed the Gloucester 18. The boat is often confused with the 1985 Gloucester 18, itself a re-badging of the Buccaneer 18. The older design is now referred to as the Gloucester 18 (Whitecap).

== Design ==
The Gloucester 18 (Whitecap) is a recreational sailboat, built predominantly of fiberglass, with wood trim. It has a fractional sloop rig, a spooned raked stem, a plumb transom, a transom-hung rudder controlled by a tiller and a retractable centerboard. It displaces 760 lb (345 kg) and carries 125 lb (57 kg) of ballast.

The boat has a draft of 5.00 ft (1.52 m) with the centerboard extended and 8 in (20 cm) with it retracted, allowing beaching or ground transportation on a trailer.

== See also ==
- List of sailing boat types
