= Newport 214 =

1970s US recreational keelboat

Development
- Designer: Harry R. Sindle
- Location: United States
- Year: 1975
- Builder: Newport Boats
- Role: Cruiser-Racer
- Name: Newport 214

Boat
- Displacement: 1,900 lb (862 kg)
- Draft: 5.00 ft (1.52 m) with centerboard down

Hull
- Type: monohull
- Construction: fiberglass
- LOA: 21.33 ft (6.50 m)
- LWL: 19.00 ft (5.79 m)
- Beam: 7.67 ft (2.34 m)

Hull appendages
- Keel: centerboard
- Ballast: 458 lb (208 kg)
- Rudder: transom-mounted rudder

Rig
- Rig type: Bermuda rig

Sails
- Sailplan: fractional rigged sloop
- Total sail area: 229.00 sq ft (21.275 m^{2})

The Newport 214 is a sailboat as a development of the 1972 Newport 212. It was built by Newport Boats in Newport, California, United States, from 1975 to 1976, but it is now out of production.

== Design ==
The Newport 214 is a recreational sailboat, built predominantly of fiberglass, with wood trim. It has a fractional sloop rig, a raked stem, a reverse transom, a transom-hung rudder controlled by a tiller and a retractable centerboard. It displaces 1,900 lb (862 kg) and carries 458 lb (208 kg) of ballast. It has foam flotation for positive buoyancy.

The boat has a draft of 5.00 ft (1.52 m) with the centerboard extended and 9 in (23 cm) with it retracted, allowing beaching or ground transportation on a trailer.

The boat is normally fitted with a small 3 to 6 hp (2 to 4 kW) outboard motor for docking and maneuvering.

The design has sleeping accommodation for four people, with a double "V"-berth in the bow cabin, a straight settee to starboard in the main cabin and a drop-down table that forms a berth on the port side. The head is located under the bow "V"-berth. Cabin headroom is 48 in (122 cm).

The design has a hull speed of 5.8 kn (10.7 km/h).

== Reception ==
In a 2010 review Steve Henkel wrote, "the '214' came from the drawing board of Olympic sailor Harry R. Sindle, but we are not sure what to make of her racing ability. The ads say she 'will qualify for MORC competition, and performs well in such competition’—but we have not found her handicap listed in our copy of the complete U.S. Sailing PHRF compilation. Best features: The cabin arrangement seems efficient, with the centerboard trunk forming one wall of the aft dinette seat (but see below for possible problems as a result). Foam flotation is a plus. Worst features: ... the heavy steel centerboard is at the top of the trunk, and the board is cut away to a mere sliver on the aft end to permit the person sitting in the dinette to get in and out without too many contortions. Although we haven't heard of any specific instances of problems, we wouldn't be surprised if the thin section on the board led to trouble with the board bending or trunk crushing at the bottom of the boat. The drawings show a relatively slender mast section with no backstay and a total of only three shrouds—another common source of trouble (such as masts bending in a breeze)."
