= Flipper (US dinghy) =

Sailboat class

Development
- Designer: Carter Pyle and Joe Quigg
- Location: United States
- Year: 1966
- No. built: 582
- Builders: Newport Boats; Mobjack Manufacturing
- Role: Children's day sailer
- Name: Flipper

Boat
- Displacement: 80 lb (36 kg)
- Draft: 2.20 ft (0.67 m)

Hull
- Type: monohull
- Construction: fiberglass
- LOA: 8.00 ft (2.44 m)
- Beam: 3.92 ft (1.19 m)

Hull appendages
- Keel: daggerboard
- Rudder: transom-mounted rudder

Rig
- Rig type: Cat rig

Sails
- Sailplan: Catboat
- Mainsail area: 37.00 sq ft (3.437 m^{2})
- Total sail area: 37.00 sq ft (3.437 m^{2})

The Flipper is an American sailboat that was designed by Carter Pyle and Joe Quigg as a daysailer intended for children, first built in 1966.

Named for the period TV series, the boat is sometimes confused with the 1970 Danish Flipper dinghy, sometimes called the Flipper Export, of which 15,000 were built.

== Production ==
The design was built by Mobjack Manufacturing in Gloucester, Virginia and Newport Boats in Newport, California, United States. A total of 582 boats were completed starting in 1966, but it is now out of production.

== Design ==
The Flipper is a recreational sailing dinghy, built predominantly of fiberglass, with wood trim. The hull bottom is foam-filled, making it unsinkable. It has an unstayed catboat rig, a nearly plumb stem, a vertical transom, a transom-hung rudder controlled by a tiller with an extension and a removable daggerboard. The hull displaces 80 lb (36 kg) fully-rigged.

The boat has a draft of 2.20 ft (0.67 m) with the daggerboard extended and 2 in (5.1 cm) with it retracted, allowing beaching or ground transportation on a trailer or automobile roof.

For sailing the design is equipped with boom vang and a center boom-mounted mainsheet.

== See also ==
- List of sailing boat types
