= Gloucester 19 =

Sailboat class

Development
- Designer: Stuart Windley & Harry R. Sindle
- Location: United States
- Year: 1983
- Builder: Gloucester Yachts
- Role: Day sailer
- Name: Gloucester 19

Boat
- Displacement: 1,600 lb (726 kg)
- Draft: 4.50 ft (1.37 m)

Hull
- Type: monohull
- Construction: fiberglass
- LOA: 19.25 ft (5.87 m)
- LWL: 16.50 ft (5.03 m)
- Beam: 7.50 ft (2.29 m)
- Engine: outboard motor

Hull appendages
- Keel: swing keel
- Ballast: 550 lb (249 kg)
- Rudder: transom-mounted rudder

Rig
- Rig type: Bermuda rig
- I foretriangle height: 21.00 ft (6.40 m)
- J foretriangle base: 8.00 ft (2.44 m)
- P mainsail luff: 22.50 ft (6.86 m)
- E mainsail foot: 8.00 ft (2.44 m)

Sails
- Sailplan: fractional rigged sloop
- Mainsail area: 90.00 sq ft (8.361 m^{2})
- Jib/genoa area: 84.00 sq ft (7.804 m^{2})
- Total sail area: 174.00 sq ft (16.165 m^{2})

The Gloucester 19 is an American trailerable sailboat that was designed by Stuart Windley and Harry R. Sindle as a day sailer and first built in 1983.

The Gloucester 19 is a daysailer development of the Lockley-Newport 19 and the Gloucester 20. The design was later developed into the Quickstep 19.

== Production ==
The design was built by Gloucester Yachts, which was formerly Lockley Newport Boats, in the United States. The boat was first built in 1983, but production had ended by the time that the company went out of business in 1988.

== Design ==
The Gloucester 19 is a recreational keelboat, built predominantly of fiberglass, with wood trim. It has a fractional sloop rig, a raked stem, a plumb transom, a transom-hung rudder controlled by a tiller and a fixed fin keel or swing keel. It displaces 1,600 lb (726 kg) and carries 550 lb (249 kg) of ballast.

The keel-equipped version of the boat has a draft of 3.25 ft (0.99 m), while the swing keel-equipped version has a draft of 4.50 ft (1.37 m) with the keel extended and 1.0 ft (0.30 m) with it retracted, allowing operation in shallow water, beaching or ground transportation on a trailer.

The boat is normally fitted with a small 3 to 6 hp (2 to 4 kW) outboard motor for docking and maneuvering.

The design has sleeping accommodation for two people, with a short double "V"-berth in the bow cabin and two straight settees in the main cabin. The head is centered under the "V"-berth in the bow cabin. Cabin headroom is 44 in (110 cm).

The design has a hull speed of 5.4 kn (10.0 km/h).

== Operational history ==
In a 2010 review Steve Henkel wrote, "this boat ... was available with either centerboard ... or fixed keel (3' 3" draft). Best features: The Gloucester version of this boat is at the lower end of the price scale (but part of this may be tied in with an only so-so level of construction quality). Worst features: Although the Space Index indicates a large available volume for stowage, in fact space is limited to bins under berths and two tiny counters separating the V-berth from quarter berths. The V-berth is short. For some reason there was no permanent backstay on some models (as there is on every one of her comp[etitor]s), resulting in a relatively loose and insufficient jib stay tension for best efficiency upwind. Construction quality is so-so at best. Critics point out a poorly finished hull-deck joint and misaligned chainplates, among other problems."

== See also ==
- List of sailing boat types
