= Jeanneau Arcachonnais =

Sailboat class

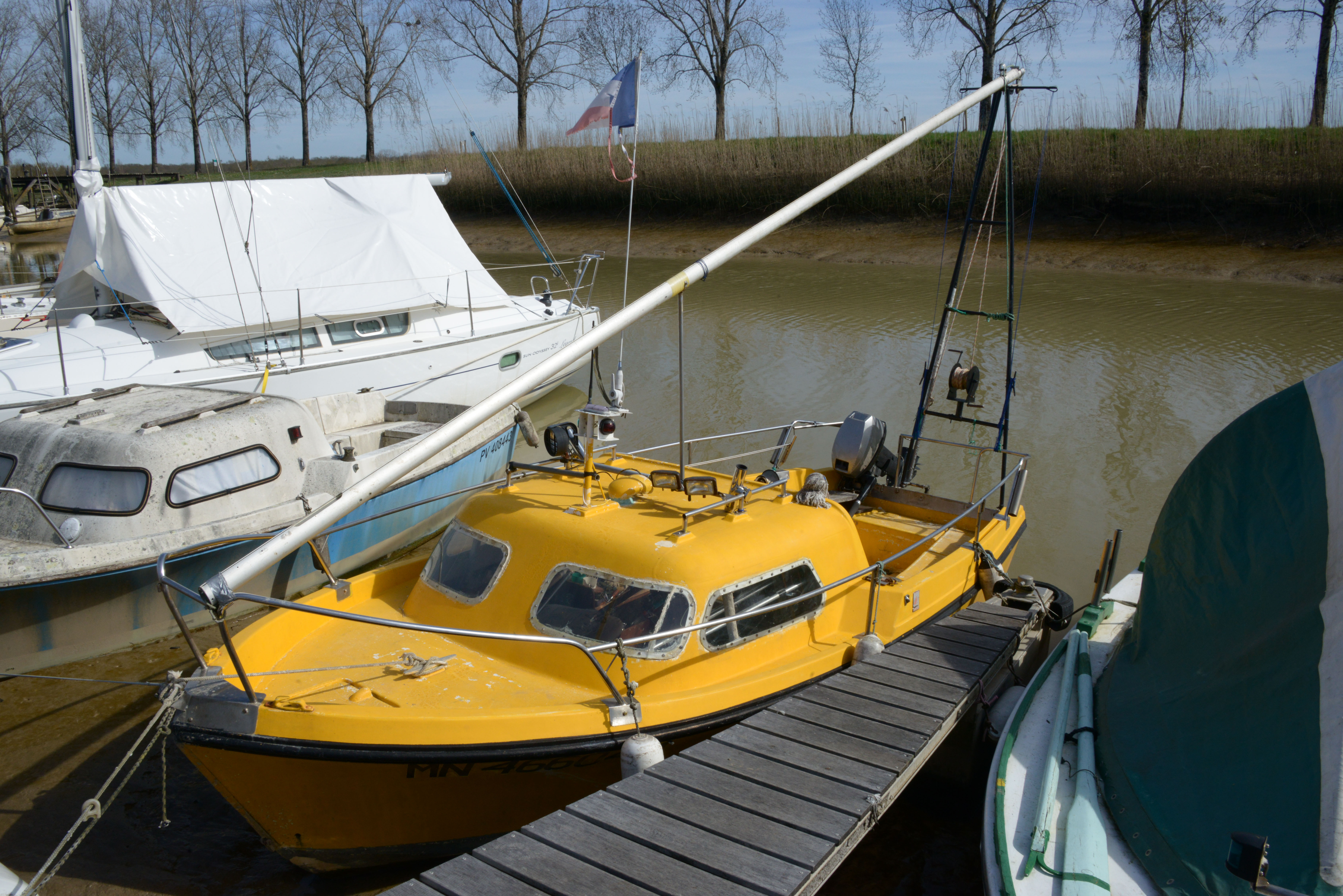

Development
- Location: France
- Year: 1969
- Builder: Jeanneau
- Role: Day sailer-cruiser
- Name: Jeanneau Arcachonnais

Boat
- Displacement: 871 lb (395 kg)
- Draft: 3.44 ft (1.05 m) with centerboard down

Hull
- Type: monohull
- Construction: fiberglass
- LOA: 17.13 ft (5.22 m)
- LWL: 16.17 ft (4.93 m)
- Beam: 7.55 ft (2.30 m)
- Engine: outboard motor

Hull appendages
- Keel: stub keel with centerboard
- Ballast: 198 lb (90 kg)
- Rudder: transom-mounted rudder

Rig
- Rig type: Bermuda rig

Sails
- Sailplan: fractional rigged sloop
- Total sail area: 150.00 sq ft (13.935 m^{2})

The Jeanneau Arcachonnais is a French trailerable sailboat that was designed as a day sailer and pocket cruiser, first built in 1969.

== Production ==
The design was built by Jeanneau in France, starting in 1969, but it is now out of production.

== Design ==
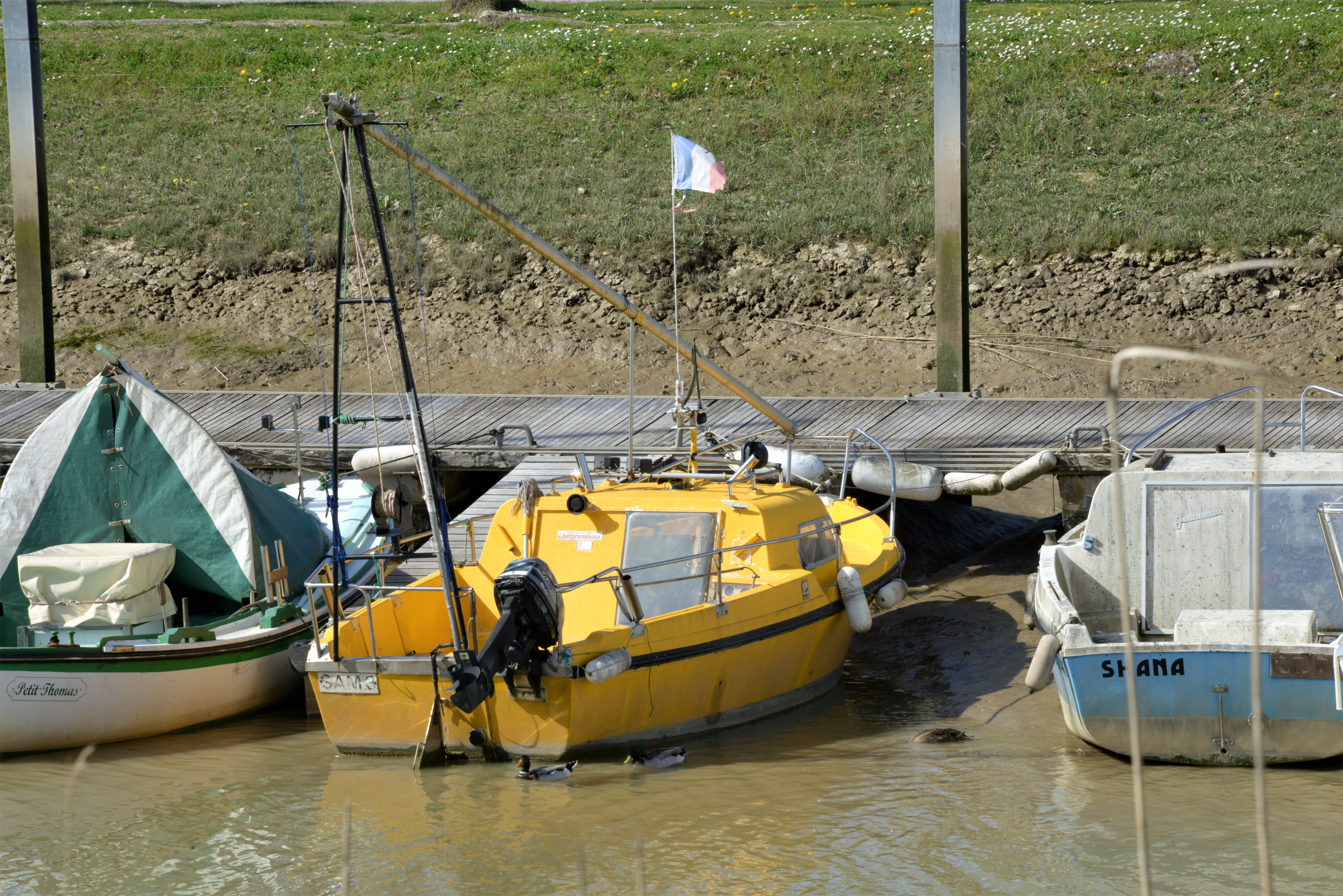
Arcachonnais

The Arcachonnais is a recreational keelboat, built predominantly of fiberglass. It has a fractional sloop rig, with a deck-stepped mast and aluminum spars. The hull has a raked stem, an angled transom, a transom-hung rudder controlled by a tiller and a fixed stub keel with a retractable centerboard. It displaces 871 lb (395 kg) and carries 198 lb (90 kg) of ballast.

The boat has a draft of 3.44 ft (1.05 m) with the centerboard extended and 1.41 ft (0.43 m) with it retracted, allowing operation in shallow water or ground transportation on a boat trailer.

The boat is normally fitted with a small outboard motor for docking and maneuvering.

The design has sleeping accommodation for two people, with a double "V"-berth in the bow cabin.

The design has a hull speed of 5.39 kn (9.98 km/h).

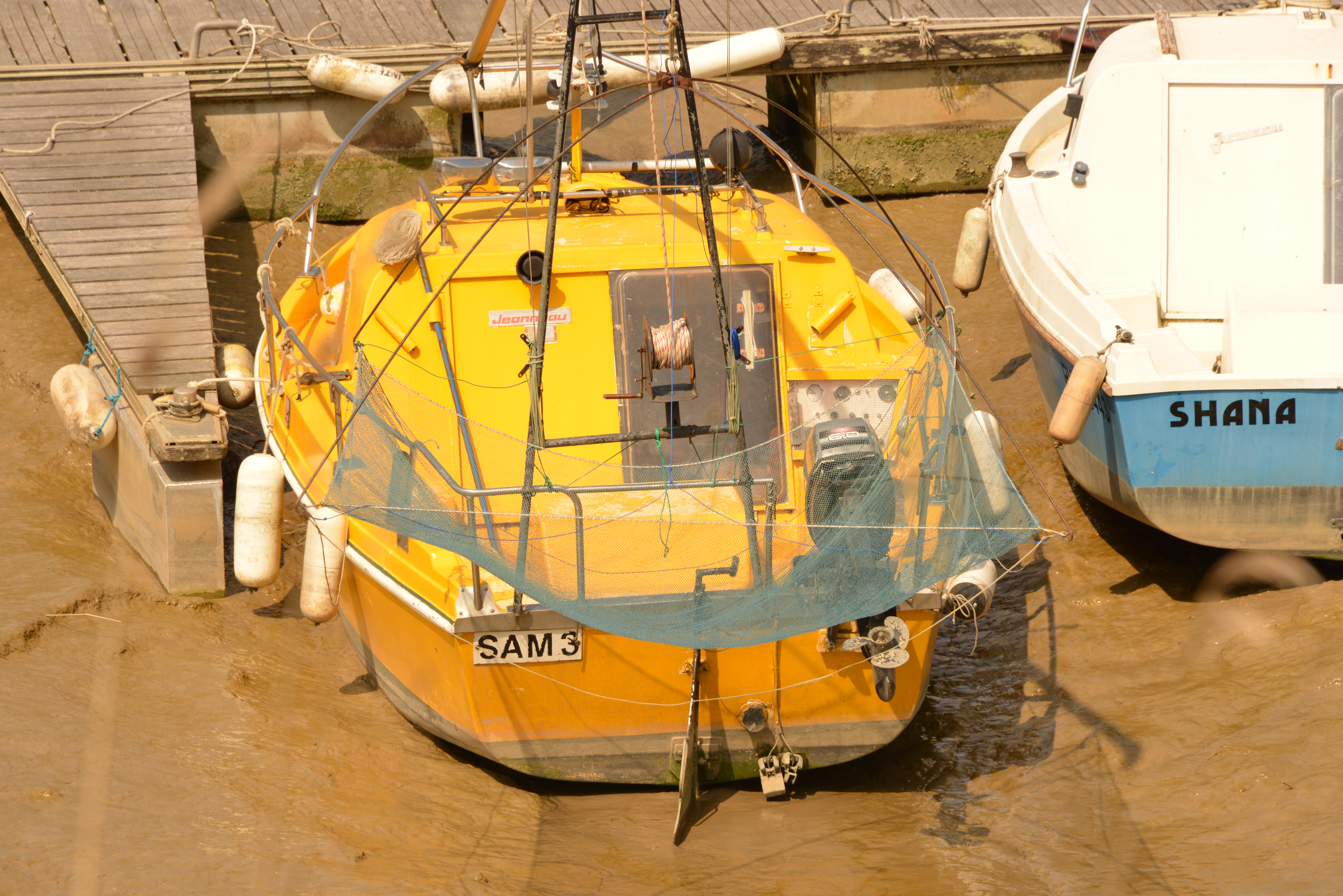
Arcachonnais, stern view

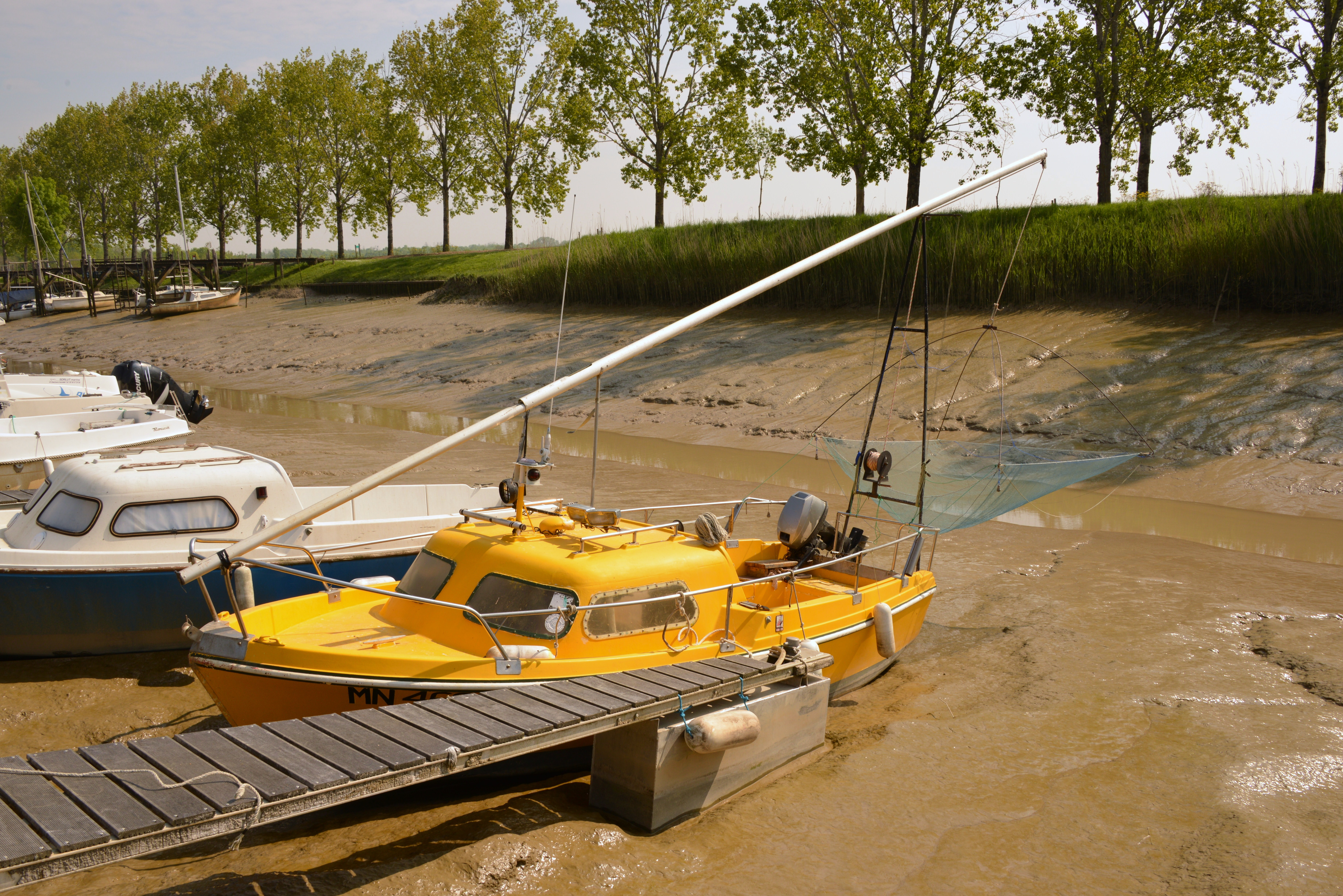
An Arcachonnais converted to a fishing boat
