= Bullet 14 =

Sailboat class

Development
- Location: United States
- Year: 1971
- Builder: Newport Boats
- Role: racer
- Name: Bullet 14

Boat
- Displacement: 180 lb (82 kg)
- Draft: 3.00 ft (0.91 m) with centerboard down

Hull
- Type: monohull
- Construction: fiberglass
- LOA: 14.08 ft (4.29 m)
- LWL: 12.75 ft (3.89 m)
- Beam: 4.67 ft (1.42 m)

Hull appendages
- Keel: centerboard
- Rudder: transom-mounted rudder

Rig
- Rig type: Cat rig

Sails
- Sailplan: Catboat
- Mainsail area: 90.00 sq ft (8.361 m^{2})
- Total sail area: 90.00 sq ft (8.361 m^{2})

The Bullet 14 is an American sailboat that was designed as a racer and first built in 1971.

== Production ==
The design was built by Newport Boats in Newport, California, United States, starting in 1971, but it is now out of production.

== Design ==
The Bullet 14 is a recreational sailing dinghy, built predominantly of fiberglass, with wood trim. It has a single sail catboat rig, a raked stem, a plumb transom, a transom-hung rudder controlled by a tiller and a retractable centerboard. It displaces 180 lb (82 kg).

The boat has a draft of 3.00 ft (0.91 m) with the centerboard extended and 5 in (13 cm) with it retracted, allowing beaching or ground transportation on a trailer.

The design has a hull speed of 4.79 kn (8.87 km/h).

== See also ==
- List of sailing boat types

Similar sailboats

- Laser (dinghy)
