= Surprise 15 =

Sailboat class

- !

Development
- Designer: Harry R. Sindle
- Location: United States
- Year: 1969
- Builder: Newport Boats
- Role: Day sailer
- Name: Surprise 15

Boat
- Displacement: 360 lb (163 kg)
- Draft: 3.83 ft (1.17 m) with centerboard down

Hull
- Type: monohull
- Construction: fiberglass
- LOA: 14.58 ft (4.44 m)
- LWL: 14.00 ft (4.27 m)
- Beam: 5.25 ft (1.60 m)

Hull appendages
- Keel: centerboard
- Rudder: transom-mounted rudder

Rig
- Rig type: Bermuda rig

Sails
- Sailplan: fractional rigged sloop
- Spinnaker area: 150 sq ft (14 m^{2})
- Total sail area: 110 sq ft (10 m^{2})

The Surprise 15 is an American sailboat that was designed by Harry R. Sindle as a daysailer and first built in 1969.

The Surprise 15 is a development of the Skipjack 15.

== Production ==
The design was built by Newport Boats in Newport, California, United States, starting in 1969, but it is now out of production.

== Design ==
The Surprise 15 is a recreational keelboat, built predominantly of fiberglass, with wood trim. It has a fractional sloop rig, a plumb stem and transom, a transom-hung rudder controlled by a tiller and a retractable centerboard. It displaces 360 lb (163 kg).

The boat has a draft of 3.83 ft (1.17 m) with the centerboard extended and 4 in (10 cm) with it retracted, allowing beaching or ground transportation on a trailer.

For downwind sailing the design may be equipped with a spinnaker of 150 sq ft (14 m^{2}).

The design has a hull speed of 5.02 kn (9.30 km/h).

== See also ==
- List of sailing boat types
