= Holiday 20 =

Sailboat class

Development
- Designer: Harry R. Sindle
- Location: United States
- Year: 1973
- Builder: Newport Boats
- Role: Day sailer

Boat
- Displacement: 1,000 lb (454 kg)
- Draft: 4.50 ft (1.37 m) with centerboard down

Hull
- Type: monohull
- Construction: fiberglass
- LOA: 19.50 ft (5.94 m)
- LWL: 17.50 ft (5.33 m)
- Beam: 6.54 ft (1.99 m)

Hull appendages
- Keel: centerboard
- Rudder: transom-mounted rudder

Rig
- Rig type: Bermuda rig

Sails
- Sailplan: fractional rigged sloop
- Total sail area: 173.00 sq ft (16.072 m^{2})

The Holiday 20 is an American sailing dinghy that was designed by Harry R. Sindle as a day sailer and first built in 1973.

== Production ==
The design was built by Newport Boats in Newport, California, United States, starting in 1973, but it is now out of production.

== Design ==
The Holiday 20 is a recreational sailboat, built predominantly of fiberglass, with wood trim. It has a fractional sloop rig, a spooned raked stem, a plumb transom, a transom-hung rudder controlled by a tiller and a retractable centerboard. It displaces 1,000 lb (454 kg).

The boat has a draft of 4.50 ft (1.37 m) with the centerboard extended and 8 in (20 cm) with it retracted, allowing beaching or ground transportation on a trailer.

The design has a hull speed of 5.6 kn (10.4 km/h).

== See also ==
- List of sailing boat types
