= Newport 17 =

1970s US sailboat

Development
- Designer: Harry R. Sindle
- Location: United States
- Year: 1974
- Builder: Newport Boats
- Role: Day sailer

Boat
- Displacement: 800 lb (363 kg)
- Draft: 4.75 ft (1.45 m) with centerboard down

Hull
- Type: monohull
- Construction: fiberglass
- LOA: 17.67 ft (5.39 m)
- LWL: 16.17 ft (4.93 m)
- Beam: 6.33 ft (1.93 m)

Hull appendages
- Keel: centerboard
- Ballast: 235 lb (107 kg)
- Rudder: transom-mounted rudder

Rig
- Rig type: Bermuda rig

Sails
- Sailplan: fractional rigged sloop
- Total sail area: 147.00 sq ft (13.657 m^{2})

The Newport 17 is a sailboat that was designed by Harry R. Sindle as a daysailer and first built in 1974.

== Production ==
The design was built by Newport Boats in Newport, California, United States, starting in 1974, but it is now out of production.

== Design ==
The Newport 17 is a recreational sailboat, built predominantly of fiberglass, with wood trim. It has a fractional sloop rig, a raked stem, a reverse transom, a transom-hung rudder controlled by a tiller and a retractable centerboard. It displaces 800 lb (363 kg) and carries 235 lb (107 kg) of ballast.

The boat has a draft of 4.75 ft (1.45 m) with the centerboard extended and 9 in (23 cm) with it retracted, allowing beaching or ground transportation on a trailer.

The boat is normally fitted with a small 2 to 5 hp (1 to 4 kW) outboard motor for docking and maneuvering.

The design has sleeping accommodation for four people, with a double "V"-berth in the bow cabin and two quarter berths in the main cabin under the cockpit that are big enough for children. There is space for a head provided. Cabin headroom is 40 in (102 cm).

The design has a hull speed of 5.4 kn (10.0 km/h).

== Operational history ==
In a 2010 review, Steve Henkel wrote, "this Harry Sindle design is a daysailer with basic overnight accommodations (double berth, place for a head, and some storage space). Best features: Sindle specialized in designing lightweight race boats, so perhaps not surprisingly, this design's sailing performance in light air is good compared to her comp[etitor]s—though her speed is also helped simply by her light weight and relatively high SA/D ratio. Storage space extending under cockpit seats is large enough to serve as quarterberths for two small children. Shallow draft with board up makes trailer launching easier. Worst features: Narrow beam and light weight compared to comps help to make her relatively tender, and high 'top hamper' (ie., freeboard and cabin height) combined with her lightness could make control quirky in gusty wind conditions. Thus even though ads say she is 'an ideal boat for novices' and 'easy to handle', we think this would be true perhaps only in light air and settled weather conditions."
