= Lockley-Newport LN-23 =

Sailboat class

Development
- Designer: Stuart Windley and Harry R. Sindle
- Location: United States
- Year: 1978
- Builder: Lockley-Newport Boats
- Role: Racer-Cruiser

Boat
- Displacement: 2,700 lb (1,225 kg)
- Draft: 5.50 ft (1.68 m)

Hull
- Type: monohull
- Construction: fiberglass
- LOA: 22.83 ft (6.96 m)
- LWL: 20.00 ft (6.10 m)
- Beam: 8.00 ft (2.44 m)
- Engine: outboard motor

Hull appendages
- Keel: stub keel and centerboard
- Ballast: 1,000 lb (454 kg)
- Rudder: transom-mounted rudder

Rig
- Rig type: Bermuda rig
- I foretriangle height: 25.50 ft (7.77 m)
- J foretriangle base: 9.75 ft (2.97 m)
- P mainsail luff: 24.75 ft (7.54 m)
- E mainsail foot: 9.00 ft (2.74 m)

Sails
- Sailplan: fractional rigged sloop
- Mainsail area: 111.38 sq ft (10.348 m^{2})
- Jib/genoa area: 124.31 sq ft (11.549 m^{2})
- Total sail area: 235.69 sq ft (21.896 m^{2})

Racing
- PHRF: 270

The Lockley-Newport LN-23, also called the Gloucester 23, is an American trailerable sailboat that was designed by Stuart Windley and Harry R. Sindle as a racer-cruiser and first built in 1978.

== Production ==
The design was built by Lockley-Newport Boats in the United States, starting in 1978. It was developed into the Gloucester 22 in 1983 and produced until the company went out of business in 1988. The molds were then acquired by Classic Yachts of Chanute, Kansas and the boat became the Classic 22 (Windley) in 1990 and was built until 2000.

== Design ==
The Lockley-Newport LN-23 is a recreational keelboat, built predominantly of fiberglass, with wood trim. It has a fractional sloop rig, a raked stem, a plumb transom, a transom-hung rudder controlled by a tiller and a fixed stub keel with a retractable centerboard. It displaces 2,700 lb (1,225 kg) and carries 1,000 lb (454 kg) of lead ballast.

The boat has a draft of 5.50 ft (1.68 m) with the centerboard extended and 1.92 ft (0.59 m) with it retracted, allowing operation in shallow water or ground transportation on a trailer.

The boat is normally fitted with a small 3 to 6 hp (2 to 4 kW) outboard motor for docking and maneuvering.

The design has sleeping accommodation for four people, with a double "V"-berth in the bow cabin and two straight settee berths in the main cabin, one of which is an optional double. The head is located just aft of the bow cabin on the port side. The fresh water tank has a capacity of 10 U.S. gallons (38 L; 8.3 imp gal). Cabin headroom is 60 in (150 cm).

The design has a PHRF racing average handicap of 270 and a hull speed of 6.0 kn (11.1 km/h).

== Operational history ==
In a 2010 review Steve Henkel wrote, "like her sisters, the Gloucester 16 ... and the Gloucester 19 ... her molds were passed from one business entity to another, and construction was perhaps understandably what one might call 'variable.' Best features: There isn't much to get excited about with this boat, in our opinion. True, it's a matter of taste, but we feel that she is a plain Jane in a crowded field with many more attractive boats vying for attention ... Sorry, but we can't conjure up any significant 'best features' for her. Worst features: Her so-so construction and a lack of amenities below top the list of things we feel work against her."

== See also ==
- List of sailing boat types

Related development

- Gloucester 22
