= Harmony 22 =

Sailboat class

Development
- Designer: Chris Bjerregaard
- Location: United States
- Year: 1977
- No. built: 37
- Builders: Harmony Yachts; Gloucester Yachts
- Role: racer

Boat
- Displacement: 3,000 lb (1,361 kg)
- Draft: 4.75 ft (1.45 m) with daggerboard down

Hull
- Type: monohull
- Construction: fiberglass
- LOA: 22.00 ft (6.71 m)
- LWL: 19.50 ft (5.94 m)
- Beam: 9.50 ft (2.90 m)
- Engine: outboard motor

Hull appendages
- Keel: daggerboard
- Ballast: 1,100 lb (499 kg)
- Rudder: transom-mounted rudder

Rig
- Rig type: Bermuda rig
- I foretriangle height: 27.00 ft (8.23 m)
- J foretriangle base: 7.80 ft (2.38 m)
- P mainsail luff: 29.33 ft (8.94 m)
- E mainsail foot: 9.75 ft (2.97 m)

Sails
- Sailplan: fractional rigged sloop
- Mainsail area: 142.98 sq ft (13.283 m^{2})
- Jib/genoa area: 105.30 sq ft (9.783 m^{2})
- Total sail area: 248.28 sq ft (23.066 m^{2})

Racing
- Class association: MORC

The Harmony 22 is an American trailerable sailboat that was designed by Chris Bjerregaard as a Midget Ocean Racing Club (MORC) racer and first built in 1977.

== Production ==
The design was built by Harmony Yachts and Gloucester Yachts in the United States. Production started in 1977, with 37 boats completed, but it is now out of production.

== Design ==
The Harmony 22 is a recreational keelboat, built predominantly of fiberglass, with wooden trim. It has a fractional sloop rig, a raked stem, a plumb transom, a transom-hung rudder controlled by a tiller and a retractable daggerboard. It displaces 3,000 lb (1,361 kg) and carries 1,100 lb (499 kg) of ballast.

The boat has a draft of 4.75 ft (1.45 m) with the daggerboard extended and 0.90 ft (27 cm) with it retracted, allowing beaching or ground transportation on a trailer.

The boat is normally fitted with a small outboard motor for docking and maneuvering.

The design has sleeping accommodation for four people, with a double "V"-berth in the bow cabin, two straight settees in the main cabin. The galley is located on the starboard side just aft of the bow cabin and has a sink. The head is located under the bow cabin "V"-berth on the starboard side. The companionway step is also a cooler.

The design has a hull speed of 5.92 kn (10.96 km/h).

== See also ==
- List of sailing boat types
