= Quickstep 19 =

Sailboat class

Development
- Designer: Stuart Windley
- Location: United States
- Year: 1989
- Builder: Quickstep Sailboats
- Role: Cruiser
- Name: Quickstep 19

Boat
- Displacement: 1,800 lb (816 kg)
- Draft: 4.50 ft (1.37 m) with keel down

Hull
- Type: monohull
- Construction: fiberglass
- LOA: 19.25 ft (5.87 m)
- LWL: 17.00 ft (5.18 m)
- Beam: 7.75 ft (2.36 m)
- Engine: outboard motor

Hull appendages
- Keel: swing keel
- Ballast: 750 lb (340 kg)
- Rudder: transom-mounted rudder

Rig
- Rig type: Bermuda rig
- I foretriangle height: 21.00 ft (6.40 m)
- J foretriangle base: 8.00 ft (2.44 m)
- P mainsail luff: 2.50 ft (0.76 m)
- E mainsail foot: 8.00 ft (2.44 m)

Sails
- Sailplan: fractional rigged sloop
- Mainsail area: 90.00 sq ft (8.361 m^{2})
- Jib/genoa area: 84.00 sq ft (7.804 m^{2})
- Total sail area: 174.00 sq ft (16.165 m^{2})

The Quickstep 19 is an American trailerable sailboat that was designed by Stuart Windley as a pocket cruiser and first built in 1989.

The Quickstep 19 is a development of the Gloucester 19.

== Production ==
The design was built by Quickstep Sailboats in Bristol, Rhode Island United States, starting in 1989, but it is now out of production.

== Design ==
The Quickstep 19 is a recreational keelboat, built predominantly of fiberglass, with wood trim. It has a fractional sloop rig, a raked stem, a plumb transom, a transom-hung rudder controlled by a tiller and a lifting keel or optional fixed fin keel. It displaces 1,800 lb (816 kg) and carries 750 lb (340 kg) of lead ballast.

The keel-equipped version of the boat has a draft of 2.17 ft (0.66 m), while the lifting keel-equipped version has a draft of 4.50 ft (1.37 m) with the keel extended and 1.00 ft (0.30 m) with it retracted, allowing operation in shallow water, beaching or ground transportation on a trailer.

The boat is normally fitted with a small 3 to 6 hp (2 to 4 kW) outboard motor for docking and maneuvering.

The design has sleeping accommodation for four people, a galley and a head, with cabin headroom of 44 in (112 cm).

The design has a hull speed of 5.5 kn (10.2 km/h).

== Operational history ==
The boat is supported by an active class club, the Quickstep Owners Group.

At its introduction in September 1989 as a 1990 model boat, a review in Cruising World stated, "the Q-19 is a jumble of anomalies that add up to a remarkably simple, satisfying whole. The hull and deck are as sleek as a day sailer’s, yet below are four comfortable berths over 6'3" long and plenty of storage behind rich teak cabinet doors for extended sojourns overnight. The boat weighs a mere 1,800 pounds, low enough so that she can be towed easily by most mid-sized cars, yet 750 pounds of ballast carried deep in the bilge allow her to carry a tall, graceful three-quarter rig that remains controllable in a breeze and efficient in light air. A simple hinged mast step enables you to set the whole program up and be off sailing in less than half an hour. Here's a little sailboat that you can be proud to take out for the day and be comfortable in once you load up with provisions and bedding and venture down the coast. And it's trailerable to boot!"

A May 1990 review in Cruising World noted that the boat had been nominated as Boat of the Year at its introduction in 1989 and was actually named "first runner-up in the under 30-foot category". The review stated "some of the comments made by the judges: 'Like all boats from this builder, a neat little packet.'; nice looking boat...'; 'greater stability than usual.'; '...easy trailering...'; '...fun to sail.' The review concluded, "the new Quickstep 19 was designed to be easy to trailer, easy to rig and easy to sail, Her extra large cockpit affords plenty of room for day sails and the interior is well thought out for occasional overnights. The Quickstep 19 features berths for four, a galley, room for a portable head and plenty of ventilation. You'll find equipment normally reserved for larger boats, like Lewmar opening ports, roller furling and Hood Sails. The Quickstep 19 is the new alternative for he sailor interested in trailerable sailboats."

In a 2010 review Steve Henkel wrote, "... best features: Unlike the Gloucester, the Quickstep is quite well-finished for a boat this small (opening ports, teak trim below, including teak and holly cabin sole), and came well equipped, e.g, roller furling jib was standard. Worst features: The rudder is deeper than the fixed keel when extended, a risk when sailing in shoal waters, The mainsheet is cleated at one side of the transom—awkward when the helmsman is trying to uncleat the sheet while sitting on the opposite side. However, this problem should be easy to solve by either hanging a cam cleat from the main boom or running the control forward to a cleat on the cabintop."

== See also ==
- List of sailing boat types

Related development

- Gloucester 19
- Quickstep 21
- Quickstep 24
