= Kite (sailboat) =

Sailboat class

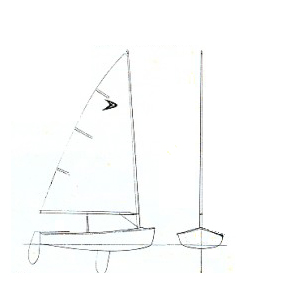

Development
- Designer: Carter Pyle
- Location: United States
- Year: 1965
- Builders: Newport Boats; Mobjack Manufacturing Corp.
- Role: One-design racer
- Name: Kite

Boat
- Displacement: 165 lb (75 kg)
- Draft: 3.00 ft (0.91 m) with daggerboard down

Hull
- Type: monohull
- Construction: fiberglass
- LOA: 11.58 ft (3.53 m)
- LWL: 10.92 ft (3.33 m)
- Beam: 5.00 ft (1.52 m)

Hull appendages
- Keel: daggerboard
- Rudder: transom-mounted rudder

Rig
- Rig type: cat rig

Sails
- Sailplan: catboat
- Mainsail area: 78.00 sq ft (7.246 m^{2})
- Total sail area: 78.00 sq ft (7.246 m^{2})

The Kite is an American sailboat that was designed by Carter Pyle as a one design racer and first built in 1965.

== Production ==
The design was built by Newport Boats in Newport Beach, California and Mobjack Manufacturing Corp. in Gloucester, Virginia starting in 1965, but it is now out of production.

== Design ==
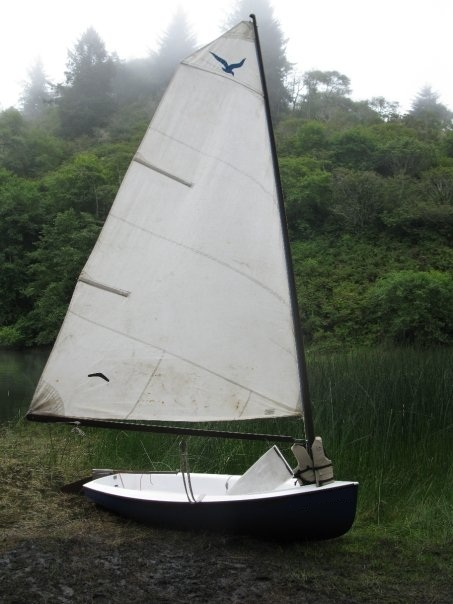
Kite

The Kite is a recreational sailing dinghy, built predominantly of fiberglass. It has a single sail catboat rig, a slightly raked stem, an angled transom, a transom-hung rudder controlled by a tiller and a daggerboard. It displaces 165 lb (75 kg).

The boat has a draft of 3.00 ft (0.91 m) with the centerboard extended and 5 in (13 cm) with it retracted, allowing beaching or ground transportation on a trailer.

For sailing the design is equipped with boom vang and a center-boom-mounted mainsheet.

The design has a hull speed of 4.43 kn (8.20 km/h).

== Operational history ==
The boat was at one time supported by a class club that organized racing events, the Kite Class, but it is now inactive.

== See also ==
- List of sailing boat types
