= Mobjack =

Mobjack may refer to:

- SS Mobjack, a coastal steamship owned by the Old Dominion Steamship Company.
- USS Mobjack (AVP-27), laid down as a United States Navy seaplane tender in 1942 but converted while under construction into motor torpedo boat tender USS Mobjack (AGP-7)
- USS Mobjack (AGP-7), a United States Navy motor torpedo boat tender in commission from 1943 to 1946
- Mobjack Bay, a bay on the western shore of Chesapeake Bay.
- Mobjack (dinghy), an American 1956 sailing dinghy design
