= Harbor 25 =

Sailboat class

Development
- Designer: Steve Schock
- Location: United States
- Year: 2007
- Builder: W. D. Schock Corp
- Role: Day sailer Cruiser
- Name: Harbor 25

Boat
- Displacement: 5,235 lb (2,375 kg)
- Draft: 5.00 ft (1.52 m)

Hull
- Type: monohull
- Construction: fiberglass
- LOA: 25.75 ft (7.85 m)
- LWL: 21.50 ft (6.55 m)
- Beam: 8.08 ft (2.46 m)
- Engine: Yanmar 2YM15 diesel engine

Hull appendages
- Keel: fin keel, with a weighted bulb
- Ballast: 1,900 lb (862 kg)
- Rudder: internally-mounted spade-type rudder

Rig
- Rig type: Bermuda rig
- I foretriangle height: 32.83 ft (10.01 m)
- J foretriangle base: 10.08 ft (3.07 m)
- P mainsail luff: 33.33 ft (10.16 m)
- E mainsail foot: 11.75 ft (3.58 m)

Sails
- Sailplan: fractional rigged sloop
- Mainsail area: 195.81 sq ft (18.191 m^{2})
- Jib/genoa area: 165.46 sq ft (15.372 m^{2})
- Total sail area: 361.28 sq ft (33.564 m^{2})

The Harbor 25 is an American trailerable sailboat that was designed by W. D. Schock Corp's Steve Schock as a day sailer-cruiser and first built in 2007.

The boat is derived from the earlier and smaller Harbor 20 design.

== Production ==
The design was built by W. D. Schock Corp in the United States, starting in 2007. It is now out of production, but still supported for parts by the builder.

== Design ==
The Harbor 25 is a recreational keelboat, built predominantly of fiberglass, with wood trim. It has a fractional sloop rig with a Hoyt jib boom, a raked stem, an angled transom, an internally mounted spade-type controlled by a tiller and a fixed fin keel, with a weighted bulb for stability. It displaces 5,235 lb (2,375 kg) and carries 1,900 lb (862 kg) of ballast.

The boat has a draft of 5.00 ft (1.52 m) with the standard keel and is fitted with a Japanese Yanmar 2YM15 diesel engine, with a Saildrive 330 and a two-blade folding prop for docking and maneuvering.

The design has a cockpit that is 8.00 ft (2.44 m) in length and accommodates six adults for sailing.

The boat has sleeping accommodation for four people, with a double "V"-berth in the bow cabin and two aft berths, one on either side. The galley is located on both sides amidships. The galley is equipped with an ice box and a sink. The head is located in the bow cabin on the port side, just aft of the "V"-berth.

The design has a hull speed of 6.21 kn (11.50 km/h).

== Operational history ==
In a 2007 review in Cruising World, Andrew Burton wrote, "The Harbor 25 is a delight to sail. After I climbed aboard, this lively sloop began doing laps around much bigger boats as they lumbered in light air around the bay. "

John Kretschmer described the boat, in a 2007 Sailing Magazine review, "It is an easily driven boat and incredibly responsive. A small turn of the tiller resulted in an instant course change. Like most finely honed boats it was easy to over steer. Falling off to a beam reach we touched 4 then 5 knots, impressive performance considering the condition. The bay was lumpy, not from wind but from powerboats steaming toward the city docks for the upcoming boat show. The Harbor 25 sluiced through the chop without pounding ... The Harbor 25 is, in many ways, just what I want in a sailboat. It is designed for daysailing, with the option of weekending. It blends great performance with very easy handling, and it's handsome, a boat to be proud of. In a perfect world I would have an offshore sailboat that I moved about the world, leaving it in exotic ports when I had to return home to work. Once home, I'd have a Harbor 25 moored out back, to hop aboard and sail, if only for an hour or two, after a long day at the computer. That sounds like a nice plan doesn't it?"

== See also ==
- List of sailing boat types

Related development

- Harbor 20
