= Newport 212 =

1970s US recreational keelboat

Development
- Designer: Harry R. Sindle
- Location: United States
- Year: 1972
- Builder: Newport Boats
- Role: Cruiser
- Name: Newport 212

Boat
- Displacement: 1,500 lb (680 kg)
- Draft: 5.00 ft (1.52 m) with keel down

Hull
- Type: monohull
- Construction: fiberglass
- LOA: 21.16 ft (6.45 m)
- LWL: 19.08 ft (5.82 m)
- Beam: 7.67 ft (2.34 m)
- Engine: outboard motor

Hull appendages
- Keel: swing keel
- Ballast: 400 lb (181 kg)
- Rudder: transom-mounted rudder

Rig
- Rig type: Bermuda rig

Sails
- Sailplan: fractional rigged sloop
- Total sail area: 182.00 sq ft (16.908 m^{2})

Racing
- PHRF: 267

The Newport 212 is a sailboat. The design was built by Newport Boats in Newport, California, United States, from 1972 until 1976, but it is now out of production.

== Design ==
The Newport 212 is a recreational keelboat, built predominantly of fiberglass, with wood trim. It has a fractional sloop rig, a spooned raked stem, a reverse transom, a transom-hung rudder controlled by a tiller and a retractable swing keel. It displaces 1,500 lb (680 kg) and carries 400 lb (181 kg) of ballast.

The boat has a draft of 5.00 ft (1.52 m) with the swing keel extended and 10 in (25 cm) with it retracted, allowing beaching or ground transportation on a trailer.

The boat is normally fitted with a small 3 to 6 hp (2 to 4 kW) outboard motor for docking and maneuvering.

The design has sleeping accommodation for four people, with a double "V"-berth in the bow cabin and two straight settee berths in the main cabin along with a drop leaf table. The optional galley is located on the starboard side just forward of the companionway ladder over the starboard berth. Cabin headroom is 50 in (127 cm).

The design has a PHRF racing average handicap of 267 and a hull speed of 5.8 kn (10.7 km/h).

== Reception ==
In a 2010 review Steve Henkel wrote, "... best features: The biggest advantage of the 212 over her comp[etitor]s is her higher Space Index, a result of comparatively generous freeboard. We also like her spacious cabin layout, complete with dropleaf table, and her shallow draft and smooth bottom with board up, intimating an easy trip on and off a trailer. And her specs make her look faster than her PHRF rating of 267 would indicate, in spite of a somewhat lower S/D, and an extra 100 pounds of displacement compared to her comp[etitor]s. Worst features: Immediately noticeable in her inboard profile drawing is her unusual centerboard lifting gear and storage position, All we can say is that it looks complicated, and when it comes to centerboard arrangements, after some bad experiences, we have come to prefer simple."
