= Classic 22 (Windley) =

Sailboat class

Development
- Designer: Stuart Windley
- Location: United States
- Year: 1989
- Builder: Classic Yachts
- Role: Cruiser
- Name: Classic 22 (Windley)

Boat
- Displacement: 2,300 lb (1,043 kg)
- Draft: 4.92 ft (1.50 m) with centerboard down

Hull
- Type: monohull
- Construction: fiberglass
- LOA: 21.67 ft (6.61 m)
- LWL: 18.67 ft (5.69 m)
- Beam: 8.00 ft (2.44 m)
- Engine: outboard motor

Hull appendages
- Keel: stub keel with centerboard
- Ballast: 500 lb (227 kg)

Rig
- Rig type: Bermuda rig
- I foretriangle height: 25.50 ft (7.77 m)
- J foretriangle base: 8.42 ft (2.57 m)
- P mainsail luff: 24.00 ft (7.32 m)
- E mainsail foot: 9.00 ft (2.74 m)

Sails
- Sailplan: fractional rigged sloop
- Mainsail area: 108.00 sq ft (10.034 m^{2})
- Jib/genoa area: 107.36 sq ft (9.974 m^{2})
- Total sail area: 215.36 sq ft (20.008 m^{2})

The Classic 22 is an American trailerable sailboat that was designed by Stuart Windley as a cruiser and first built in 1989.

The Classic 22 (Windley) is a development of the Gloucester 22, that been built by Gloucester Yachts.

The design was originally marketed by the manufacturer as the Classic 22, but is now usually referred to as the Classic 22 (Windley) to differentiate it from the unrelated 1962 Classic 22 design by George Harding Cuthbertson and produced by Grampian Marine.

== Production ==
The design was built by Classic Yachts in Chanute, Kansas, United States, starting in 1989, but it is now out of production.

== Design ==
The Classic 22 (Windley) is a recreational keelboat, built predominantly of fiberglass, with wood trim. It has a fractional sloop rig and a fixed stub keel, with a retractable centerboard. It displaces 2,300 lb (1,043 kg) and carries 500 lb (227 kg) of ballast.

The boat has a draft of 4.92 ft (1.50 m) with the centerboard extended and 1.67 ft (0.51 m) with it retracted, allowing operation in shallow water, beaching or ground transportation on a trailer.

The design has a hull speed of 5.79 kn (10.72 km/h).

== See also ==
- List of sailing boat types
