= Harbor 20 =

Sailboat class

- Harbor 20s at the starting line

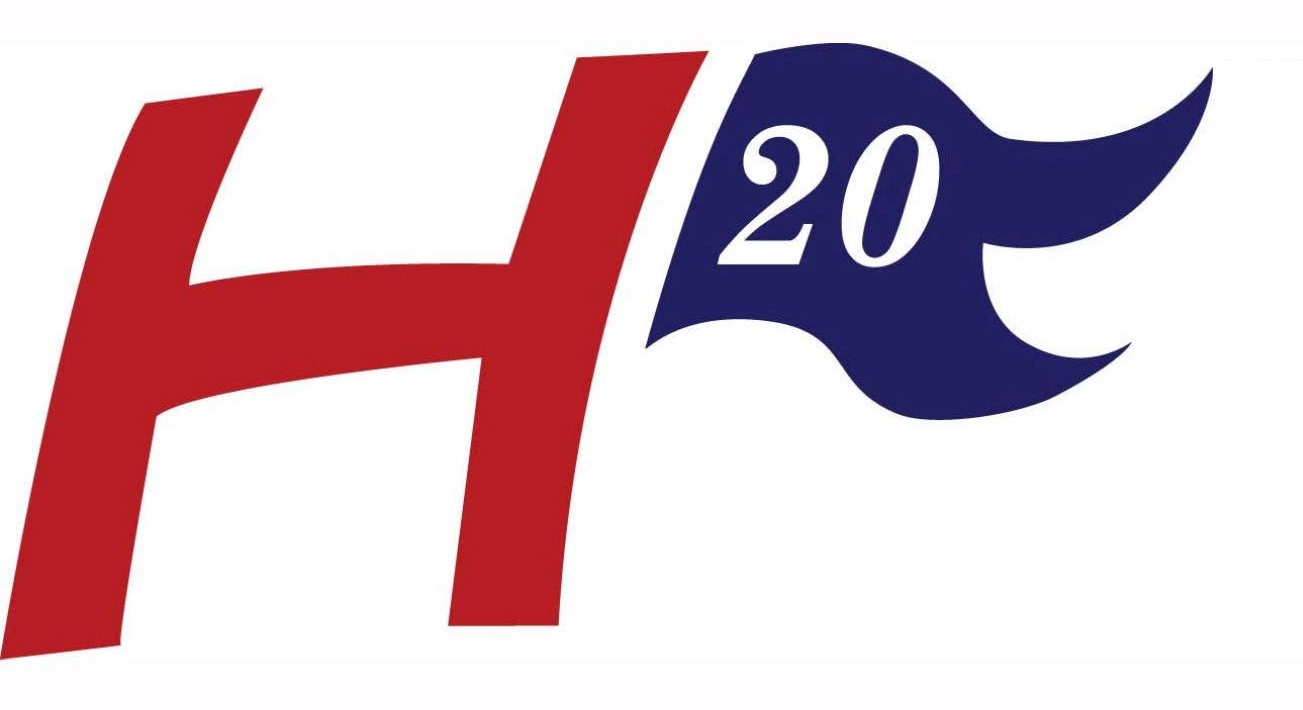

Development
- Designer: Steve Schock
- Location: United States
- Year: 1997
- No. built: 300 (2014)
- Builders: W. D. Schock Corp; One Design Composites
- Role: One design racer-day sailer

Boat
- Displacement: 1,800 lb (816 kg)
- Draft: 3.50 ft (1.07 m)

Hull
- Type: monohull
- Construction: fiberglass
- LOA: 20.00 ft (6.10 m)
- LWL: 17.00 ft (5.18 m)
- Beam: 7.00 ft (2.13 m)
- Engine: electric motor

Hull appendages
- Keel: fin keel with weighted bulb
- Ballast: 900 lb (408 kg)
- Rudder: internally-mounted spade-type rudder

Rig
- Rig type: Bermuda rig
- I foretriangle height: 25.75 ft (7.85 m)
- J foretriangle base: 7.00 ft (2.13 m)
- P mainsail luff: 26.00 ft (7.92 m)
- E mainsail foot: 10.00 ft (3.05 m)

Sails
- Sailplan: fractional rigged sloop
- Mainsail area: 130.00 sq ft (12.077 m^{2})
- Jib/genoa area: 90.13 sq ft (8.373 m^{2})
- Total sail area: 220.13 sq ft (20.451 m^{2})

The Harbor 20 is an American trailerable sailboat that was designed by W. D. Schock Corp's Steve Schock as a day sailer and one design club racer. It was first built in 1997.

The boat was developed into the larger Harbor 25 in 2007.

== Production ==
The design has been built by W. D. Schock Corp in California, United States, since 1997 and remains in production.

Harbor 20 aerial photo

More than 300 boats had been completed by 2014.

A Florida-based company, Enviro-Holdings, LLC, operating under the trade name of One Design Composites signed a multi-year contract with W. D. Schock Corp in December 2018 to build the Harbor 20. The company reported that production started in January 2018 and the first boat was delivered in March 2018, with additional boats under construction at that time. By 2021 both the company websites had been taken down and production by that company may have ended.

== Design ==
Harbor 20's sailing in Newport Beach

The Harbor 20 is a recreational keelboat, built predominantly of fiberglass, with a small cuddy cabin in the bow and a large cockpit that can accommodate up to eight people.

It has a fractional sloop rig, a raked stem, an angled transom, an internally mounted spade-type rudder controlled by a wooden tiller and a fixed fin keel with a weighted bulb. It displaces 1,800 lb (816 kg) and carries 900 lb (408 kg) of ballast.

The boat has a draft of 3.50 ft (1.07 m) with the standard keel installed.

Harbor 20's sailing downwind showing the Hoyt jib boom

The boat may be fitted with an optional factory-supplied 24-volt electric motor for docking and maneuvering, that is stowed on a retractable stainless steel pivot arm in the stern lazarette. The motor is deployed on an arm to the starboard side of the boat and pinned in place for use. The motor is powered by twin batteries that give four hours endurance at full power and may be recharged using shore power when docked. The maximum speed provided by the motor is 5.0 kn (9.3 km/h), while the design has a hull speed of 5.52 kn (10.22 km/h).

For sailing the design is equipped with a self-tacking Hoyt jib boom system and a roller furling jib. The loose-footed mainsail is full-battened and stowed on the boom with standard lazy jacks. All lines are led under the foredeck and cleated on a "control panel" shelf aft of the boat's mast on the cuddy cabin. It also has two cockpit ice boxes for refreshments.

== Operational history ==
Harbor 20 sailboats fleet racing downwind in Newport Beach, California.

The boat is supported by an active class club, the Harbor 20 Class Association, with seven local fleets that organize racing events.

John Kretschmer described the Harbor 20, in a 2007 Sailing Magazine article, as, "a handsome daysailer ... [which] merged ease of handling, solid construction, exciting performance and traditional lines."

In a 2014 review on boats.com, Zuzana Prochazka wrote, "the smart-looking 20 footer was designed to be easy to sail; easy to put away after a day on the water; easy to maintain; and most of all, fun enough to get old salts sailing again. The design hit its mark on all counts. Singlehanding a Harbor 20 is as much a breeze as it is fun to sail, lending itself nicely to civilized afternoon cocktail outings....You can sail a Harbor 20 poorly and still get it to move easily. However, the real skill, and one that takes years to master, is fine-tuning the Harbor 20's performance so that it’s an effortless dance, on the race course or off. Either way, an afternoon on a Harbor 20 always reminds me of the thrill of sailing for the first time that made me say, 'Damn, this is fun.'"

== Photo Gallery ==
Team match-racing start

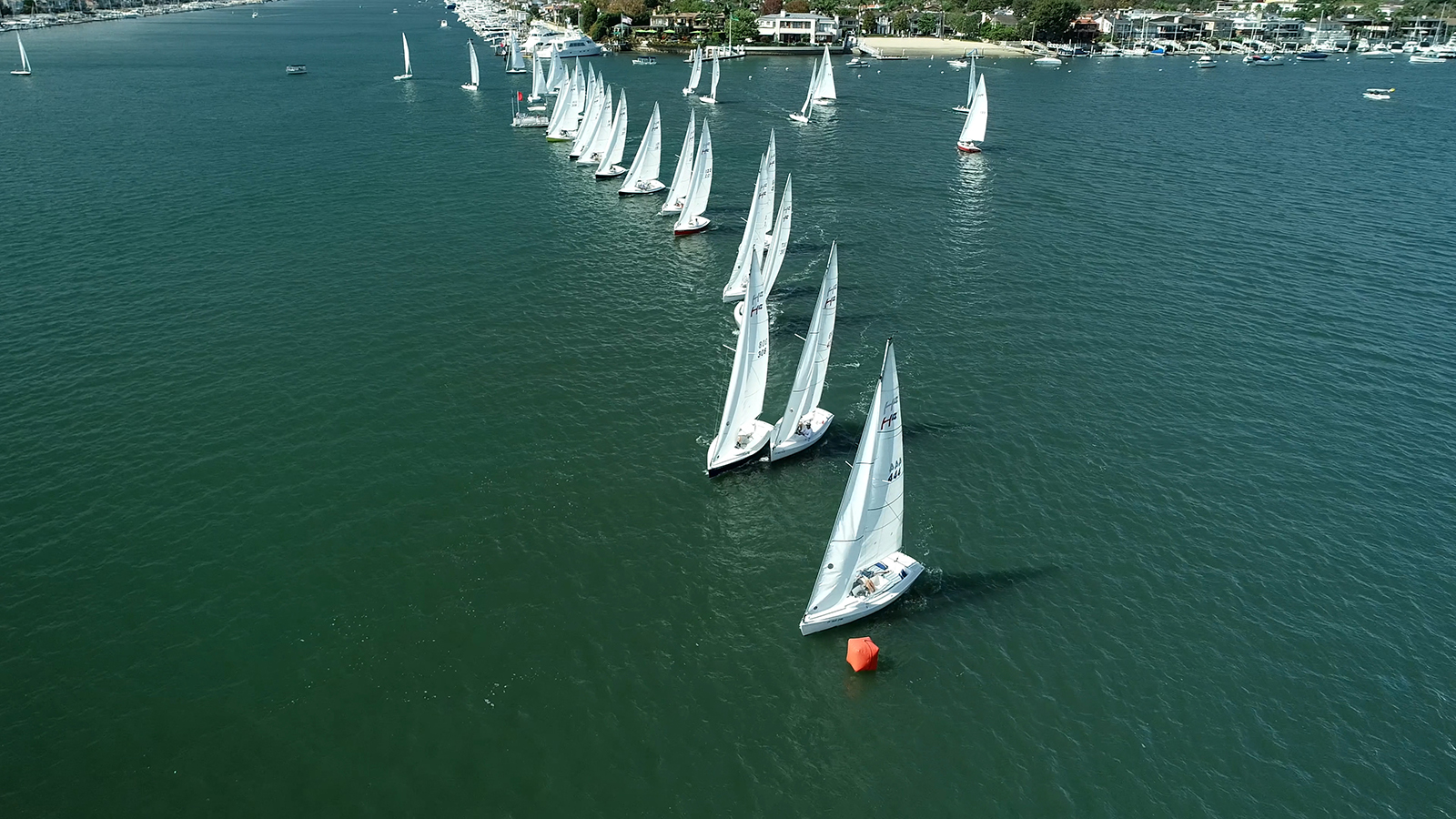
Fleet Championships Start

Horizon Job

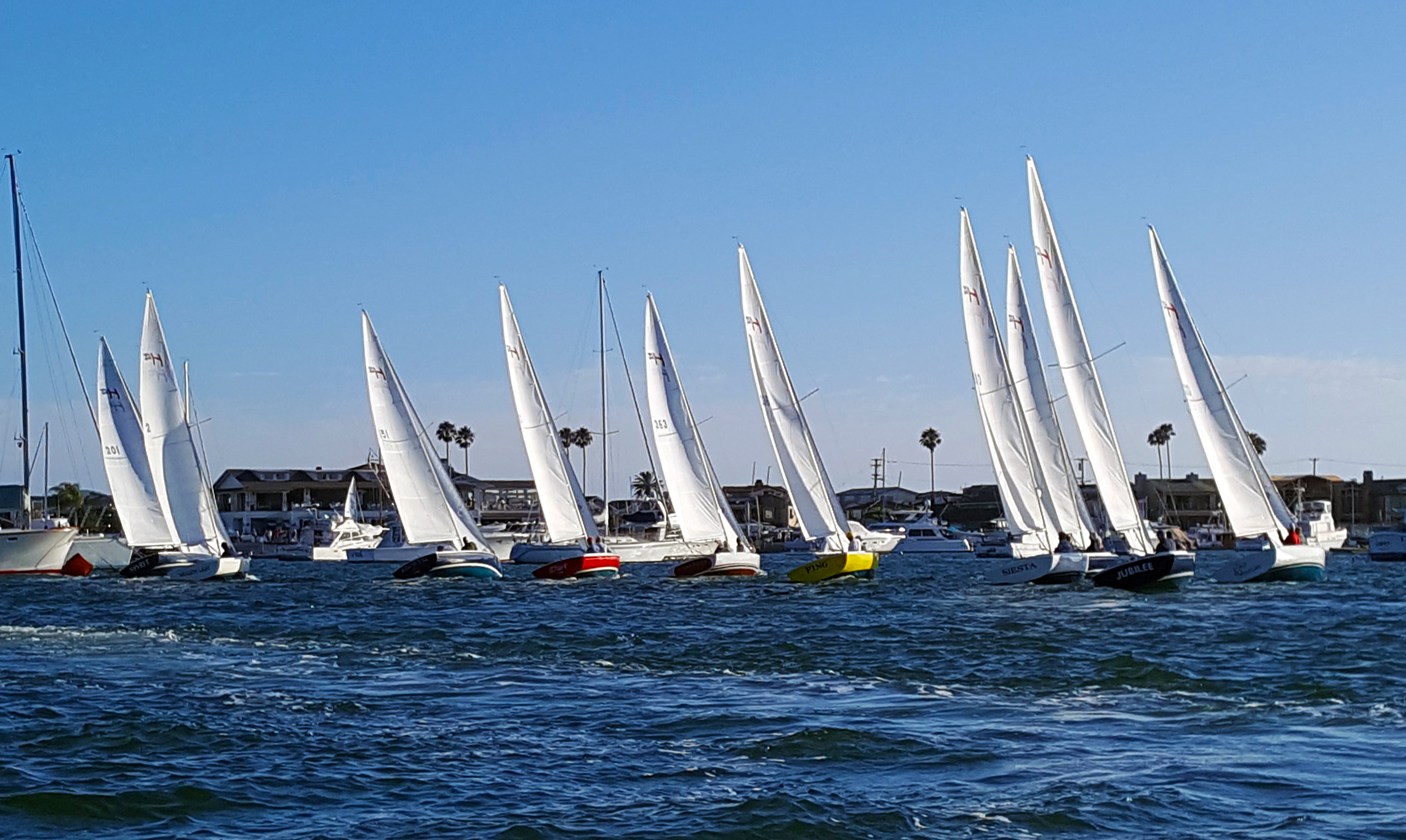
Harbor 20s racing

== Instructional Video Gallery ==
Sailing Clinic presented by Harry Pattison part 1

Sailing Clinic presented by Harry Pattison part 2

== See also ==
Harbor 20 National Class website

- List of sailing boat types

Related development

- Harbor 25
