= Flipper (Danish dinghy) =

Sailboat class

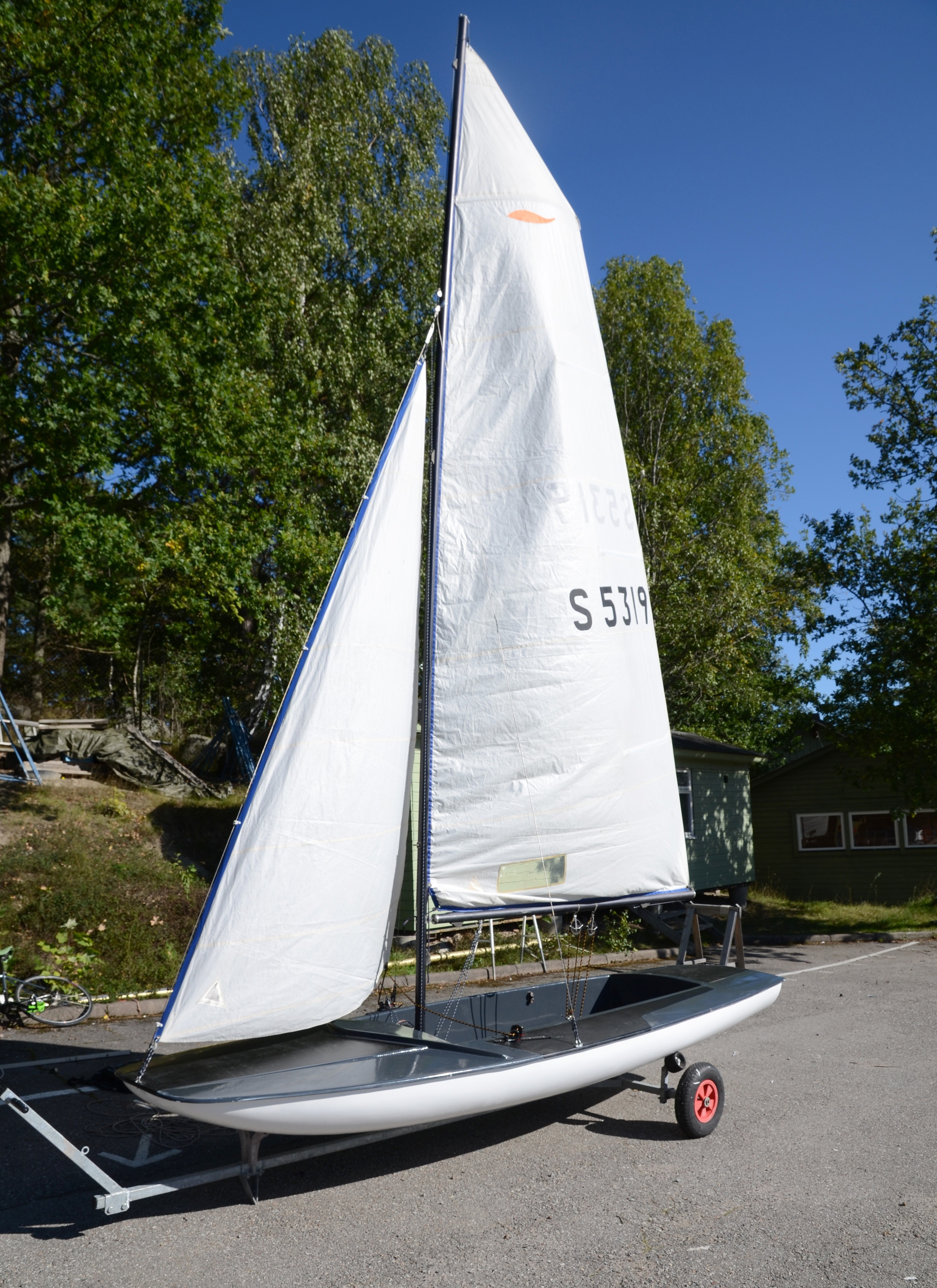

Development
- Designer: Peter Bruun
- Location: Denmark
- Year: 1970
- No. built: 15,000
- Builder: Intermark Sailcraft
- Name: Flipper

Boat
- Displacement: 154 lb (70 kg)
- Draft: 2.62 ft (0.80 m) with the daggerboard down

Hull
- Type: monohull
- Construction: fiberglass
- LOA: 13.25 ft (4.04 m)
- Beam: 4.33 ft (1.32 m)

Hull appendages
- Keel: daggerboard
- Rudder: transom-mounted rudder

Rig
- Rig type: Bermuda rig

Sails
- Sailplan: fractional rigged sloop
- Total sail area: 107.64 sq ft (10.000 m^{2})

The Flipper, sometimes called the Flipper Export, is a Danish sailboat that was designed by Peter Bruun as a racer and first built in 1970.

The boat is sometimes confused with the 1970 American Flipper dinghy, of which 582 were built.

== Production ==
The design was built by Intermark Sailcraft ApS in Denmark, with 15,000 boats completed, starting in 1970, but it is now out of production.

== Design ==
The Flipper is a recreational dinghy, built predominantly of fiberglass. It has a fractional sloop rig, a scow hull, a plumb transom, a transom-hung rudder controlled by a tiller and a removable daggerboard. It displaces 154 lb (70 kg).

The boat has a draft of 2.62 ft (0.80 m) with the daggerboard extended and 4 in (10 cm) with it retracted, allowing beaching or ground transportation on a trailer.

== See also ==
- List of sailing boat types
