= Gloucester 20 =

Sailboat class

Development
- Designer: Stuart Windley and Harry R. Sindle
- Location: United States
- Year: 1981
- No. built: 165
- Builder: Gloucester Yachts
- Role: Cruiser
- Name: Gloucester 20

Boat
- Displacement: 1,650 lb (748 kg)
- Draft: 4.50 ft (1.37 m) with keel down

Hull
- Type: monohull
- Construction: fiberglass
- LOA: 19.50 ft (5.94 m)
- LWL: 16.50 ft (5.03 m)
- Beam: 7.50 ft (2.29 m)
- Engine: outboard motor

Hull appendages
- Keel: stub keel with swing keel
- Ballast: 550 lb (249 kg)
- Rudder: transom-mounted rudder

Rig
- Rig type: Bermuda rig
- I foretriangle height: 21.00 ft (6.40 m)
- J foretriangle base: 8.00 ft (2.44 m)
- P mainsail luff: 22.50 ft (6.86 m)
- E mainsail foot: 8.00 ft (2.44 m)

Sails
- Sailplan: fractional rigged sloop
- Mainsail area: 90.00 sq ft (8.361 m^{2})
- Jib/genoa area: 84.00 sq ft (7.804 m^{2})
- Total sail area: 174.00 sq ft (16.165 m^{2})

The Gloucester 20 is an American trailerable sailboat that was designed by Stuart Windley and Harry R. Sindle as a pocket cruiser and first built in 1981.

The Gloucester 19 is a later daysailer development of the Gloucester 20.

== Production ==
The design was built by Gloucester Yachts in the United States starting in 1981, with 165 boats completed, but it is now out of production.

== Design ==
The Gloucester 20 is a recreational keelboat, built predominantly of fiberglass, with wood trim. It has a fractional sloop rig, a raked stem, a plumb transom, a transom-hung rudder controlled by a tiller and a stub keel with a swing keel or, optionally, a fixed fin keel. It displaces 1,650 lb (748 kg) and carries 550 lb (249 kg) of ballast.

The fin keel-equipped version of the boat has a draft of 3.00 ft (0.91 m), while the swing keel-equipped version has a draft of 4.50 ft (1.37 m) with the keel extended and 1.00 ft (0.30 m) with it retracted, allowing beaching or ground transportation on a trailer.

The boat is normally fitted with a small outboard motor for docking and maneuvering.

The design has sleeping accommodation for four people, with a double "V"-berth in the bow cabin and two straight settee berths in the main cabin. The galley is located on both sides just aft of the bow cabin and is equipped with a sink. The head is located centered under the bow cabin berth.

== See also ==
- List of sailing boat types
