= Skipjack 15 =

Sailboat class

- Class symbol

Development
- Designer: Harry R. Sindle and Carter Pyle
- Location: United States
- Year: 1965
- No. built: 800
- Builders: Newport Boats; New Design Sailboats
- Role: Sailing dinghy
- Name: Skipjack 15

Boat
- Crew: two
- Displacement: 340 lb (154 kg)
- Draft: 3.83 ft (1.17 m) with the centerboard down

Hull
- Type: Monohull
- Construction: Fiberglass
- LOA: 14.58 ft (4.44 m)
- Beam: 5.25 ft (1.60 m)

Hull appendages
- Keel: centerboard
- Rudder: transom-mounted rudder

Rig
- Rig type: Bermuda rig

Sails
- Sailplan: Fractional rigged sloop
- Mainsail area: 82 sq ft (7.6 m^{2})
- Jib/genoa area: 43 sq ft (4.0 m^{2})
- Spinnaker area: 125 sq ft (11.6 m^{2})
- Total sail area: 125 sq ft (11.6 m^{2})

Racing
- D-PN: 93.1

The Skipjack 15 is an American sailing dinghy that was designed by Harry R. Sindle and Carter Pyle and first built in 1965.

The Skipjack 15 design was developed into the Surprise 15 in 1969.

== Production ==
The design was initially built by Newport Boats in California, United States starting in 1965. After 1970 the rights were purchased by New Design Sailboats of Benbrook, Texas and that company built several hundred examples before production ended. A total of 800 boats were completed.

== Design ==
The Skipjack 15 is a recreational sailboat, built predominantly of fiberglass. It has a fractional sloop rig with aluminum spars. The mainsail is a full roach design, which is fully battened and there is a bar-style mainsheet traveler. The hull has a spooned plumb stem, a vertical transom, a transom-hung rudder controlled by a tiller and a retractable aluminum centerboard. It displaces 340 lb (154 kg).

The boat has a draft of 3.83 ft (1.17 m) with the centerboard extended and 4 in (10 cm) with it retracted, allowing beaching or ground transportation on a trailer.

For sailing the design is equipped with a downhaul, boom vang and adjustable jib leads. The boom allows mainsail roller reefing. A spinnaker of 125 sq ft (11.6 m^{2}) may be fitted.

The design includes several mast step locations, allowing moving the mast forward and sailing it as a catboat with mainsail only.

The design has a Portsmouth Yardstick racing average handicap of 93.1 and is normally raced with a crew of two sailors.

== Operational history ==
The boat was used as a trainer by both the United States Coast Guard Academy and the United States Naval Academy.

In a 1994 review Richard Sherwood wrote, "the Skipjack’s design combines ideas from the Finn hull, Mobjack (wide side decks, flat cockpit floor), and Flying Dutchman (single spreader, mid-boom sheeting). Upon seeing the design, the U.S. Naval Academy immediately ordered 20. The Skipjack rides high, with the cockpit floor above the water line so transom bailers can be used, and no cockpit cover is necessary at anchor."

== See also ==
- List of sailing boat types
