= Lockley-Newport LN-27 =

Sailboat class

Development
- Designer: Stuart Windley and Harry R. Sindle
- Location: United States
- Year: 1979
- Builder: Lockley Newport Boats
- Role: Cruiser
- Name: Lockley-Newport LN-27

Boat
- Displacement: 5,200 lb (2,359 kg)
- Draft: 3.50 ft (1.07 m)

Hull
- Type: monohull
- Construction: fiberglass
- LOA: 26.67 ft (8.13 m)
- LWL: 21.50 ft (6.55 m)
- Beam: 8.00 ft (2.44 m)
- Engine: Volvo 7 hp (5 kW) diesel engine

Hull appendages
- Keel: fin keel
- Ballast: 2,000 lb (907 kg)
- Rudder: internally-mounted spade-type rudder

Rig
- Rig type: Bermuda rig
- I foretriangle height: 30.00 ft (9.14 m)
- J foretriangle base: 11.25 ft (3.43 m)
- P mainsail luff: 28.25 ft (8.61 m)
- E mainsail foot: 10.50 ft (3.20 m)

Sails
- Sailplan: fractional rigged sloop or masthead sloop
- Mainsail area: 148.31 sq ft (13.778 m^{2})
- Jib/genoa area: 168.75 sq ft (15.677 m^{2})
- Total sail area: 317.06 sq ft (29.456 m^{2})

The Lockley-Newport LN-27 is an American sailboat that was designed by Stuart Windley and Harry R. Sindle as a cruiser and first built in 1979.

The Lockley-Newport LN-27 design was developed into the Gloucester 27 in 1983.

== Production ==
The design was built by Lockley Newport Boats in the United States, starting in 1979, but it is now out of production.

== Design ==
The Lockley-Newport LN-27 is a recreational keelboat, built predominantly of fiberglass, with wood trim. It has a fractional sloop or optional masthead sloop rig, a raked stem, a reverse transom, an internally mounted spade-type rudder controlled by a tiller and a fixed fin keel. It displaces 5,200 lb (2,359 kg) and carries 2,000 lb (907 kg) of ballast.

The boat has a draft of 3.50 ft (1.07 m) with the standard keel.

The boat is fitted with a Swedish Volvo diesel engine of 7 hp (5 kW) for docking and maneuvering.

The design has sleeping accommodation for five or six people, with a double "V"-berth in the bow cabin, a straight settee berth that is an optional double in the main cabin and an aft cabin with a double berth on the port side. The galley is located on the starboard side just forward of the companionway ladder. The galley is U-shaped and is equipped with a two-burner stove, an icebox and a sink. The head is located just aft of the bow cabin.

The design has a hull speed of 6.21 kn (11.50 km/h).

== See also ==
- List of sailing boat types

Related development

- Gloucester 27
