= Mobjack (dinghy) =

Sailboat class

Development
- Designer: Roger Moorman
- Location: United States
- Year: 1956
- No. built: 537
- Builders: Mobjack Manufacturing; Lockley Newport Boats
- Role: One-design racer
- Name: Mobjack

Boat
- Crew: two
- Displacement: 450 lb (204 kg)
- Draft: 4.00 ft (1.22 m) with centerboard down

Hull
- Type: monohull
- Construction: fiberglass
- LOA: 17.00 ft (5.18 m)
- LWL: 16.75 ft (5.11 m)
- Beam: 6.50 ft (1.98 m)

Hull appendages
- Keel: centerboard
- Rudder: transom-mounted rudder

Rig
- Rig type: Bermuda rig

Sails
- Sailplan: fractional rigged sloop
- Spinnaker area: 240 sq ft (22 m^{2})
- Total sail area: 180 sq ft (17 m^{2})

The Mobjack is an American sailboat that was designed by Roger Moorman as a one design racer and first built in 1956.

The boat is named for Mobjack Bay, Virginia.

== Production ==
The design was built by Mobjack Manufacturing in Gloucester, Virginia and Newport Boats in Newport, California, United States, among other builders. Production started in 1956 and ended in 2003 with 537 boats completed, but it is now out of production.

== Design ==
The Mobjack is a recreational sailing dinghy, built predominantly of fiberglass, with wood trim. It has a fractional sloop rig, a plumb stem and transom, a transom-hung rudder controlled by a tiller and a folding centerboard. It displaces 450 lb (204 kg).

The boat has a draft of 4.00 ft (1.22 m) with the centerboard extended and 9 in (23 cm) with it retracted, allowing beaching or ground transportation on a trailer.

For sailing the design may be equipped with a spinnaker of 240 sq ft (22 m^{2}). A single trapeze is normally used by the crew.

== Operational history ==
The boat is supported by an active class club that organizes racing events, the International Mobjack Association.

== See also ==
- List of sailing boat types
