= Buccaneer 18 =

Sailboat class

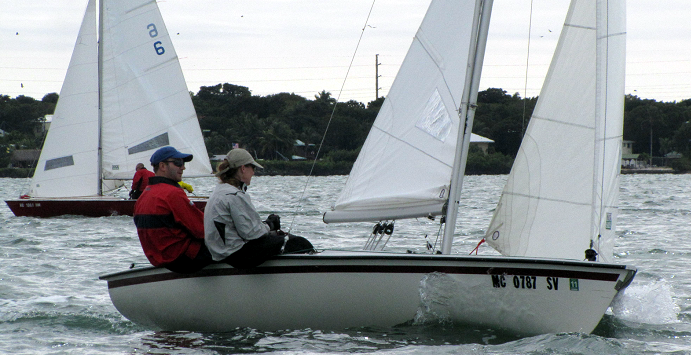

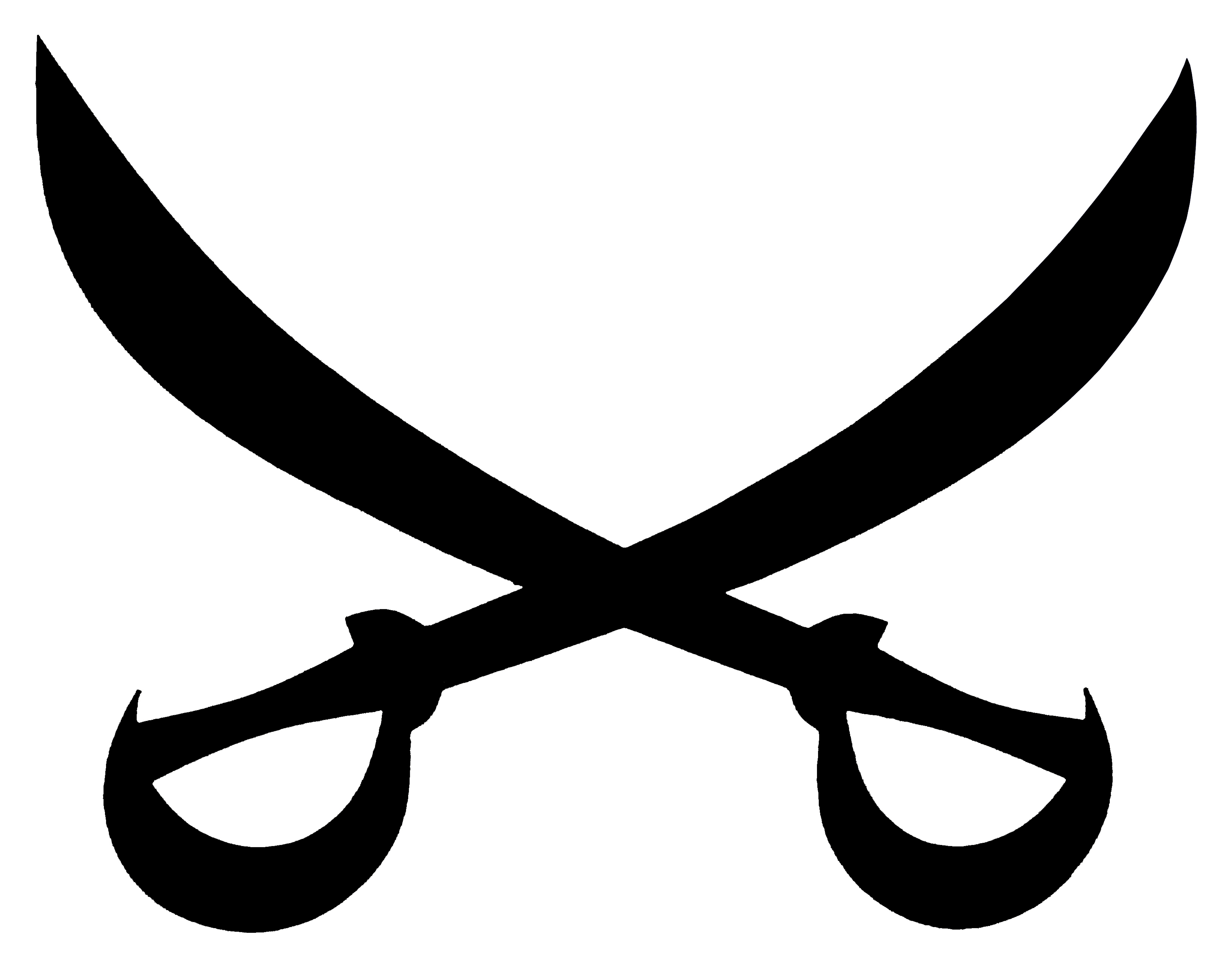

Development
- Designer: Rod Macalpine-Downie and Dick Gibbs
- Location: United States
- Year: 1966
- No. built: 5,000
- Builders: Chrysler Corporation; Texas Marine Industries; Wellcraft Marine Corporation; Gloucester Yachts; Cardinal Yachts; Nickels Boatworks; WindRider LLC
- Role: One-design racer
- Name: Buccaneer 18

Boat
- Displacement: 500 lb (227 kg)
- Draft: 3.83 ft (1.17 m) with centerboard down

Hull
- Type: Monohull
- Construction: Fiberglass
- LOA: 18.00 ft (5.49 m)
- LWL: 16.67 ft (5.08 m)
- Beam: 6.00 ft (1.83 m)

Hull appendages
- Keel: centerboard
- Rudder: transom-mounted rudder

Rig
- Rig type: Bermuda rig

Sails
- Sailplan: Fractional rigged sloop
- Mainsail area: 114 sq ft (10.6 m^{2})
- Jib/genoa area: 61 sq ft (5.7 m^{2})
- Spinnaker area: 178 sq ft (16.5 m^{2})
- Total sail area: 175 sq ft (16.3 m^{2})

Racing
- D-PN: 87.9

The Buccaneer 18, also called the Buccaneer dinghy and the Gloucester 18, is an American planing sailing dinghy that was designed in 1966 by Rod Macalpine-Downie and Dick Gibbs as a one-design racer and day sailer. The prototype was first shown in 1967 at Yachting's "One of a Kind" Regatta, in which it placed second.

== Production ==
The design was built by a long line of companies in the United States. About 5,000 boats had been built by the time production ended in 2020.

The design was initially built by Chrysler Marine, a division of the Chrysler Corporation, in Plano, Texas, starting in 1968. The company completed just over 4,000 boats, during the period 1968-1980. As a result of a government bailout of Chrysler Marine's car manufacturing parent company, the marine division was sold in 1980 to a consortium of six former Chrysler Marine executives who formed Texas Marine International Inc. (Texas Marine Industries), retaining the location in Plano, Texas. Texas Marine built about 700 boats in 1981-1982.

Wellcraft Marine Corporation's Starwind division built the design from 1982-1984, completing about 250 boats.

From 1985-1986 Gloucester Yachts, part of Lockley Newport Boats, built 59 boats under the name Gloucester 18, before the company went out of business in 1988. Cardinal Yachts took over production from 1987-2000, building 28 boats over 13 years.

In 2008 Nickels Boatworks became the official builder. That company merged with WindRider LLC in 2015 and production continued at their Burton, Michigan plant, under the WindRider. The Buccaneer 18 Class Association is currently pursuing new manufacturing partnerships to meet ongoing demand from multiple sailors and fleets who have expressed documented readiness to purchase new boats

== Design ==
The Buccaneer 18 is a recreational sailboat, built predominantly of vinylester resin fiberglass, with wooden trim. It has a fractional sloop rig with foam-filled anodized aluminum spars. The hull has a spooned raked stem, a slightly reverse transom, a transom-hung, kick-up rudder controlled by a tiller and a kick-up centerboard. It displaces 500 lb (227 kg) and has positive flotation for safety. The boat was sold alongside the smaller Mutineer 15, which shared many common design characteristics.

The boat has a draft of 3.83 ft (1.17 m) with the centerboard extended and 7 in (18 cm) with it retracted, allowing beaching or ground transportation on a trailer.

For sailing the design may be equipped with a spinnaker of 178 sq ft (16.5 m^{2}). It has adjustable jib fairleads and jib roller furling. A boom vang, jib hauler and spinnaker launching tube are optional. For stowage it has a lazarette and compartment under the covered foredeck.

The design has a Portsmouth Yardstick racing average handicap of 87.9 and is raced with a minimum crew of two sailors, although it can accommodate six people.

== Operational history ==
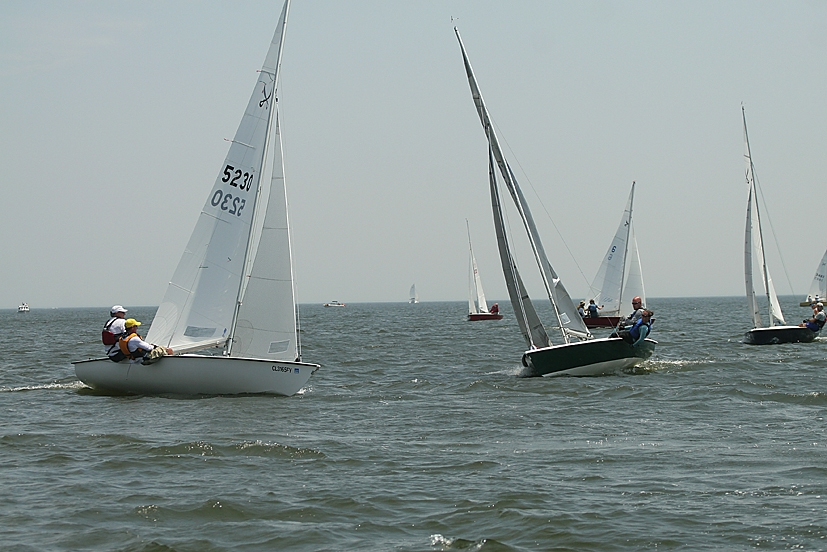
Buccaneer sailboats racing

The type is supported by a type club, the Buccaneer 18 Class Association, that regulates the boat design and holds races.

In a 1994 review Richard Sherwood wrote that the, "Buccaneer, originally built by Chrysler, is a big boat with a 7-foot 3-inch cockpit, seating six. The boat was designed to be easy to sail and maintain. The hull is planing, with the wide beam well aft and a lean bow."

== See also ==
- List of sailing boat types
