= Pacific Catamaran =

The Pacific Catamaran or Pacific Cat is a sailing catamaran capable of high speeds across open water.

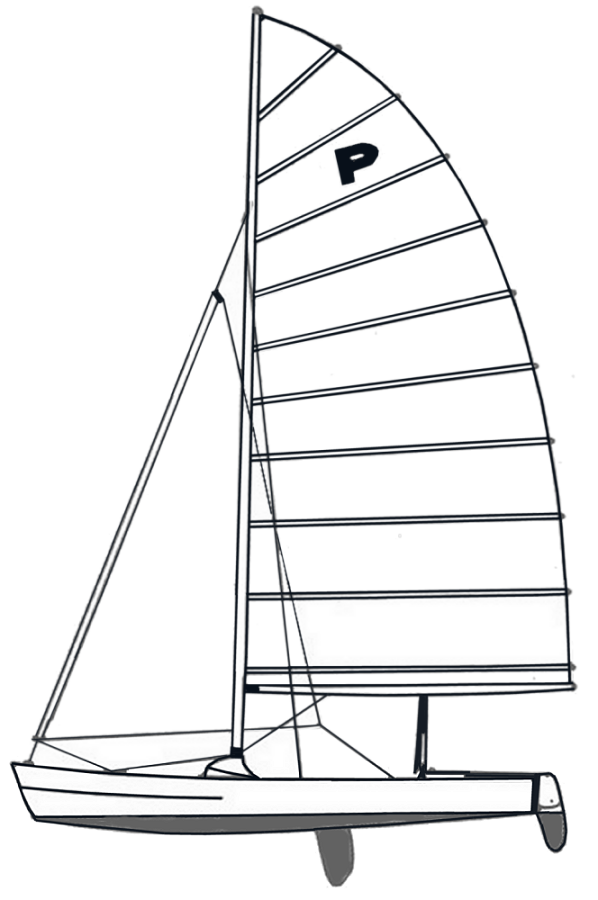
Pacific Catamaran PC-19

== PC-19 ==
Newport Boats and Mobjack Manufacturing began building the Pacific Cat PC-19 in 1960. It has a fiberglass hull with fractional sloop standing rigging and running rigging. This sailboat did not have a cabin but rather a well for the comfort and safety of passengers.

- Length: 18.75 feet (5.72 m)
- Beam: 7 feet 11 inches
- Draft: 2 feet 11 inches
- Sail area: 267 square feet (24.8 m^{2})
- Displacement: 540 pounds

== See also ==
- List of multihulls
