= Quickstep music =

- Music for the ballroom dance of quickstep
- Quickstep (march music) A lively style of march music
