= Gloucester 27 =

Sailboat class

Development
- Designer: Stuart Windley and Harry R. Sindle
- Location: United States
- Year: 1983
- Builder: Gloucester Yachts
- Role: Cruiser
- Name: Gloucester 27

Boat
- Displacement: 5,500 lb (2,495 kg)
- Draft: 3.50 ft (1.07 m)

Hull
- Type: monohull
- Construction: fiberglass
- LOA: 26.67 ft (8.13 m)
- LWL: 21.50 ft (6.55 m)
- Beam: 8.00 ft (2.44 m)
- Engine: inboard motor

Hull appendages
- Keel: fin keel
- Ballast: 2,500 lb (1,134 kg)
- Rudder: internally-mounted spade-type rudder

Rig
- Rig type: Bermuda rig
- I foretriangle height: 30.00 ft (9.14 m)
- J foretriangle base: 11.25 ft (3.43 m)
- P mainsail luff: 28.25 ft (8.61 m)
- E mainsail foot: 10.50 ft (3.20 m)

Sails
- Sailplan: fractional rigged sloop
- Mainsail area: 148.31 sq ft (13.778 m^{2})
- Jib/genoa area: 168.75 sq ft (15.677 m^{2})
- Total sail area: 317.06 sq ft (29.456 m^{2})

The Gloucester 27 is an American sailboat that was designed by Stuart Windley and Harry R. Sindle as a cruiser and first built in 1983.

The Gloucester 27 is a development of the 1979 Lockley-Newport LN-27.

== Production ==
The design was built by Gloucester Yachts in the United States, starting in 1983, but it is now out of production.

== Design ==
The Gloucester 27 is a recreational keelboat, built predominantly of fiberglass, with wood trim. It has a fractional sloop rig, a raked stem, a reverse transom, an internally mounted spade-type rudder controlled by a tiller and a fixed fin keel. It displaces 5,500 lb (2,495 kg) and carries 2,500 lb (1,134 kg) of ballast.

The boat has a draft of 3.50 ft (1.07 m) with the standard keel.

The design has a hull speed of 6.21 kn (11.50 km/h).

== See also ==
- List of sailing boat types

Related development

- Lockley-Newport LN-27
