= Gloucester 22 =

1980s US recreational keelboat

Development
- Designer: Stuart Windley and Harry R. Sindle
- Location: United States
- Year: 1983
- No. built: 100
- Builder: Gloucester Yachts
- Role: Cruiser

Boat
- Displacement: 2,400 lb (1,089 kg)
- Draft: 4.92 ft (1.50 m) with centerboard down

Hull
- Type: monohull
- Construction: fiberglass
- LOA: 21.67 ft (6.61 m)
- LWL: 18.67 ft (5.69 m)
- Beam: 8.00 ft (2.44 m)
- Engine: outboard motor

Hull appendages
- Keel: stub keel and centerboard
- Ballast: 800 lb (363 kg)
- Rudder: transom-mounted rudder

Rig
- Rig type: Bermuda rig
- I foretriangle height: 25.50 ft (7.77 m)
- J foretriangle base: 8.50 ft (2.59 m)
- P mainsail luff: 24.00 ft (7.32 m)
- E mainsail foot: 9.00 ft (2.74 m)

Sails
- Sailplan: fractional rigged sloop
- Mainsail area: 108.00 sq ft (10.034 m^{2})
- Jib/genoa area: 108.38 sq ft (10.069 m^{2})
- Total sail area: 216.38 sq ft (20.102 m^{2})

Racing
- PHRF: 186

The Gloucester 22 is a recreational keelboat built by Gloucester Yachts in the United States from 1983 until 1988, with 100 examples built.

== Design ==
It is a development of the 1978 Lockley-Newport LN 23. It was developed into the Classic 22 (Windley) in 1990 and built by Classic Yachts of Chanute, Kansas, until 2000.

The fiberglass hull has a raked stem, a plumb transom, a transom-hung rudder controlled by a tiller and a fixed stub keel, with a retractable centerboard. The boat has a draft of 4.92 ft (1.50 m) with the centerboard extended and 1.67 ft (0.51 m) with it retracted. It has a hull speed of 5.8 kn (10.7 km/h).

The design has sleeping accommodation for four people, with a double "V"-berth in the bow cabin and a two straight settee berths in the main cabin. The slide-out galley is located on the starboard side just aft of the companionway ladder. The galley is equipped with a two-burner stove. Cabin headroom is 52 in (130 cm).

It has a fractional sloop rig.

== Reception ==
In a 2010 review Steve Henkel wrote, "This vessel ... represents a genre of relatively lightweight and bare-bones designs that can be produced and sold relatively cheaply. Best features: She has the lowest minimum draft with board up compared with her comp[etitor]s, good for exploring shoal waters under power—though ... her stub keel keeps her from being in the easiest group for trailer launching and retrieving. Her high-aspect centerboard drops down to give her a draft of almost five feet, giving good performance to windward. She has six opening ports plus a small ventilation hatch forward, an advantage in sultry weather. Worst features: Construction is only so-so, as the boat is targeted to a thrifty audience. The low cost is obtained partly by offering what is usually standard equipment as optional. A pivoting rudder is optional, but should have been standard; there is danger of clipping it off as it extends below the board-up keel draft."
