= Lockley Newport Boats =

Sailboat manufacturer

- Company type: Privately held company
- Industry: Boat building
- Founded: 1964
- Defunct: 1988
- Headquarters: Newport Beach, California, United States
- Products: Sailboats

Lockley Newport Boats was an American boat builder based in Newport Beach, California. The company specialized in the design and manufacture of fiberglass sailboats.

The company was founded in 1964 and went through several name changes and changes of ownership prior to going out of business in 1988.

== History ==
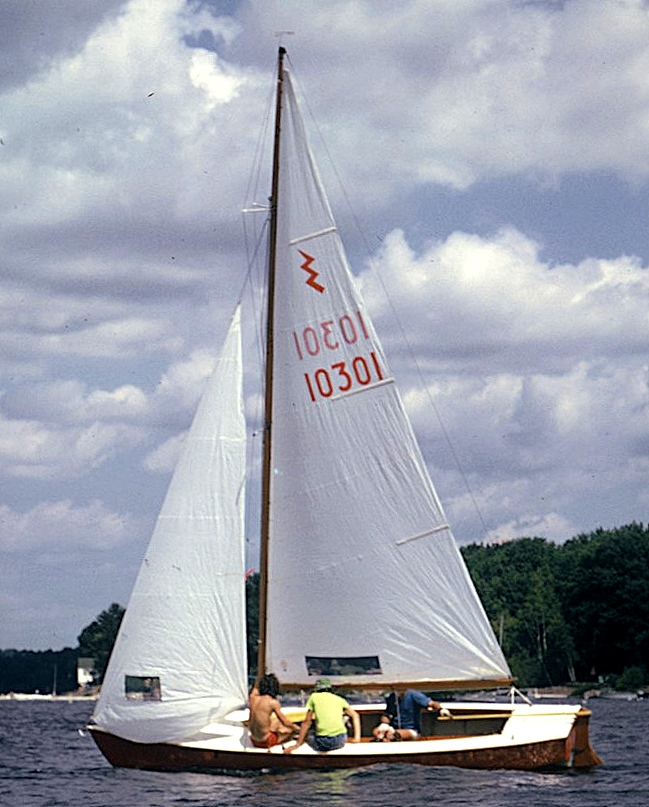
Lightning

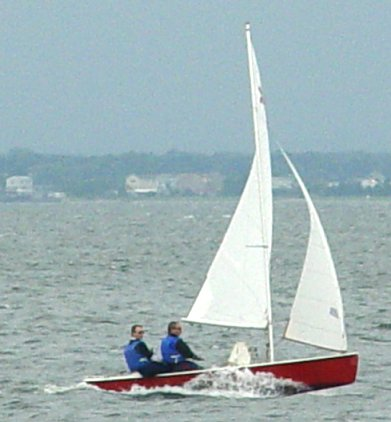
Windmill

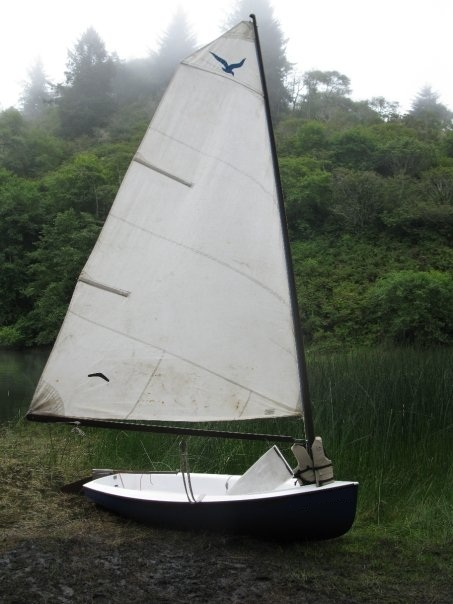
Kite

The company was founded as Newport Boats in 1964, building a line of sailing dinghies and small daysailers. An east coast factory was established in Gloucester, Virginia to provide boats for that market.

The company was acquired by the Browning Arms Company, a firearms manufacturer and later by Elgin International. In 1976 the company was bought by Lockley Manufacturing and was renamed Lockley Newport Boats. In 1981 the name was changed again to Gloucester Yachts. The company went out of business in 1988.

The molds for a number of the designs built by the company were later bought by Classic Yachts of Chanute, Kansas and produced, including the Gloucester 22 and the Lockley-Newport LN-23, which were built until 2000.

In a series of 2010 boat reviews Steve Henkel criticized the company's work, calling the quality of construction "so-so", noting that they were aimed at a budget market and that "the low cost is obtained partly by offering what is usually standard equipment as optional".

== Boats ==
Summary of boats built by Newport Boats, Lockley Newport Boats and Gloucester Yachts:

- Albacore (dinghy) - 1964
- Finn (dinghy) - 1964
- Flying Dutchman - 1964
- Lightning (dinghy) - 1964
- Mobjack (dinghy) - 1964
- Pacific Catamaran - 1964
- Windmill (sailing dinghy) - 1964
- Kite (sailboat) - 1965
- Newport 16 - 1965
- Skipjack 15 - 1965
- Buccaneer 18 - 1968
- Flipper (US dinghy) - 1968
- Newport 20 - 1968
- Surprise 15 - 1969
- Blue Crab 11 - 1971
- Bullet 14 - 1971
- Newport 212 - 1972
- Holiday 20 - 1973
- Newport 17 - 1974
- Newport 214 - 1975
- Harmony 22 - 1977
- Lockley-Newport LN-23 - 1978
- Lockley-Newport LN-27 - 1979
- Gloucester 20 - 1981
- Gloucester 19 - 1983
- Gloucester 22 - 1983
- Gloucester 27 - 1983
- Gloucester 18 (Whitecap) - 1984
- Gloucester 18 - 1985
- Gloucester 16 - 1986
- Gloucester 15 - 1987

== See also ==
- List of sailboat designers and manufacturers
