= Quickstep (march music) =

Type of march music

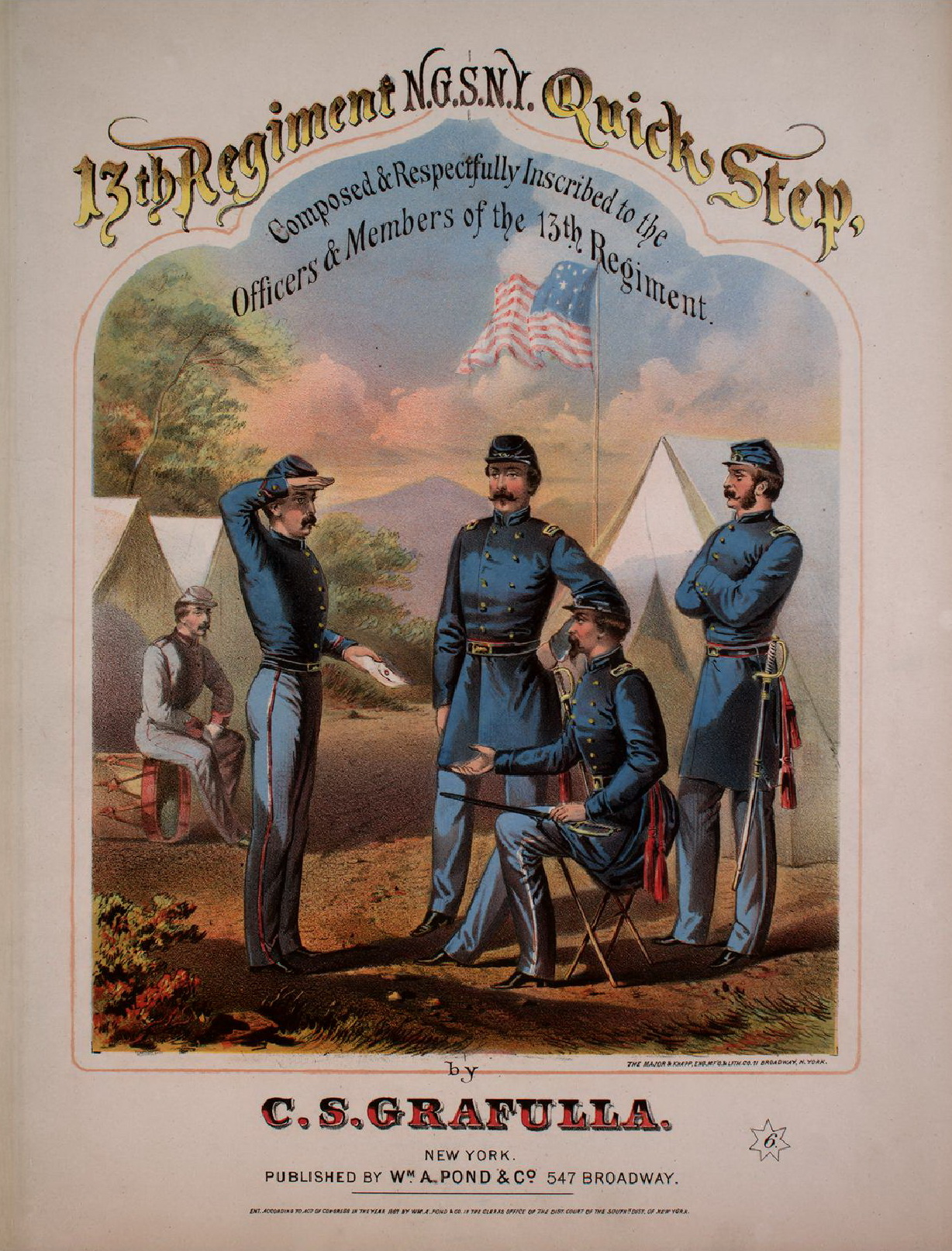
13th Regiment Quickstep

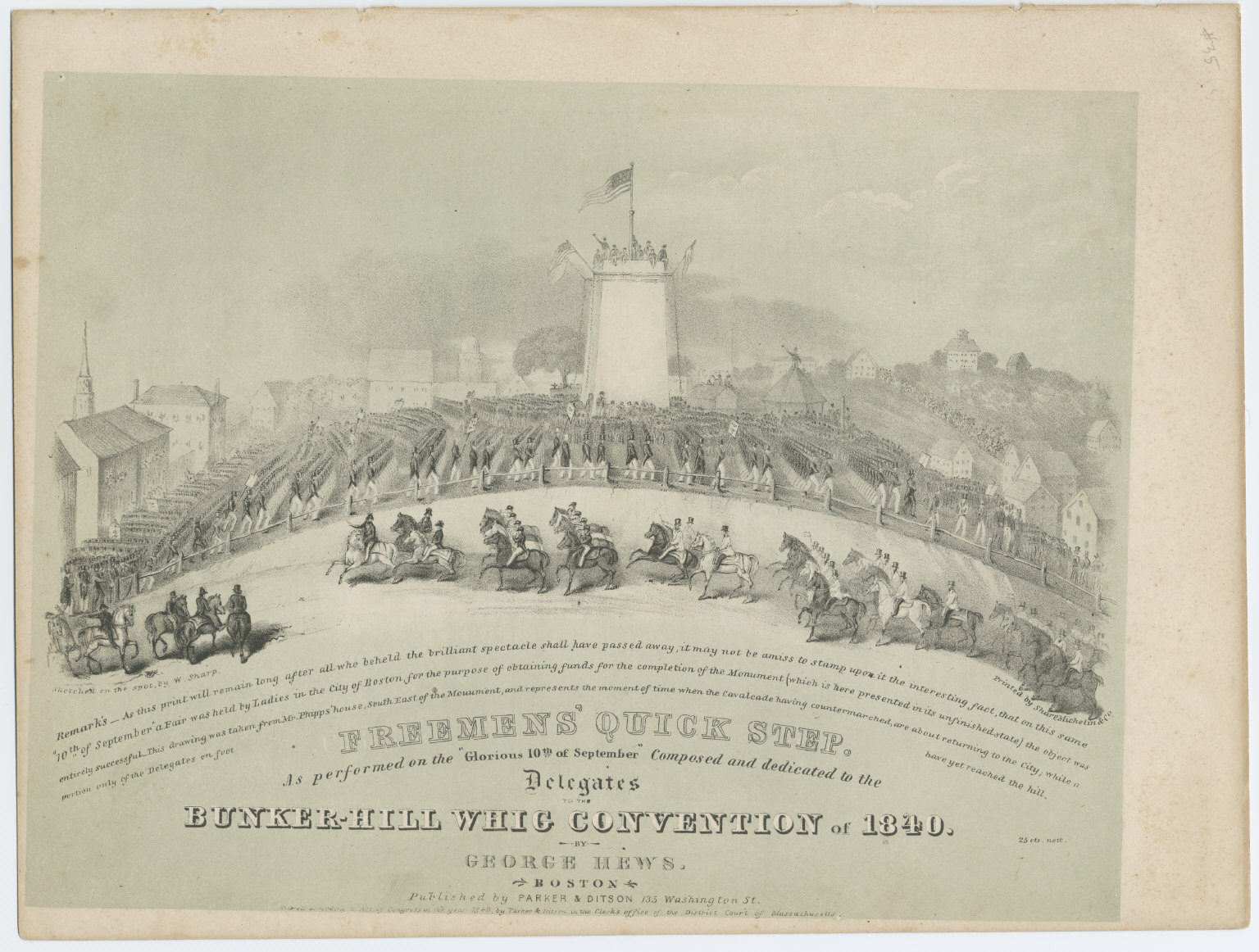

Quickstep (also given as quick-step, quick step or quick march and known by its German name Geschwindmarsch and its French name pas redoublé) is a lively style of the march music to accompany marches in quick time. Like all marches, quick marches are part of the standard repertory of military bands but they are utilized in a different fashion than the standard slower marches. The slower tempo of the standard march makes it ideal for executing military exercises, reviews and parades. In contrast the tempo of the quick march, twice as fast as the slow march, make it ideal for executing military manoeuvers.

== History ==
Evidence of the use of music within a military context dates back to Ancient history where advancing armies from a variety of cultures were spurred on by the sounds of musical instruments. Little military music from this period survives. In the Middle Ages European armies had their own unique drum calls, and later writings about European military advances and maneuvers during the 16th and 17th centuries indicate that armies were not only using marches, but that armies were often associated with their own particular marches and march rhythms.

It's not clear when exactly the quick march developed within this historical progression, because most military music was not written down before the 17th-century. However, given the practical nature of adopting faster tempos for executing certain military objectives, its likely that a concept of a faster tempo march dates back to the Ancient world. The first extant quickstep music is from 17th-century France with several French pas redoublé being commissioned and written down for use by the military bands of Louis XIV; including quick marches by Jean-Baptiste Lully and André Danican Philidor the elder.

The quickstep is a common march style in Western Music. It has been a part of American march music since the early 19th century where it was initially used as an accompaniment to military cadenced step, which is faster than a ceremonial march. The 1908 Grove's Dictionary of Music and Musicians writes that it is the English name for the music of the quick march in the army, in which there are 116 steps of 30 inches per minute, as compared to 75 steps of 30 inches in slow march and 165 of 33 inches in the double time march.

== Description ==
An 1875 article in English Mechanic and World of Science gives the following description:

The military quickstep is formed according to certain strict rules which need not be observed by ordinary arrangers it will suffice for them to remember that it is divided into two portions an "initial march" and a "trio". The former consists of two or three strains in two four or six eight time each of which may be repeated according to the required length of the march the latter of a smoothly flowing melody in key of the subdominant. The latter of a smoothly flowing melody in the key of the sub dominant. <...> The trio should be as distinct as possible in form and time from the former portions of the march and on it the arranger may lavish all his care. It may be made a solo for cornet or euphonion, a duet for cornet and tenor or it may be harmonised as a concerted piece for the principal instruments with a staccato accompaniment for the subordinates.

See Ternary form § Compound ternary or trio form for the explanation of the term "trio" in this context.

In addition to an initial march and a trio, quicksteps often included an introduction and a closing section.

Quickstep has become a dominant march form in the second half of the 19th century.
