= Quickstep 24 =

Sailboat class

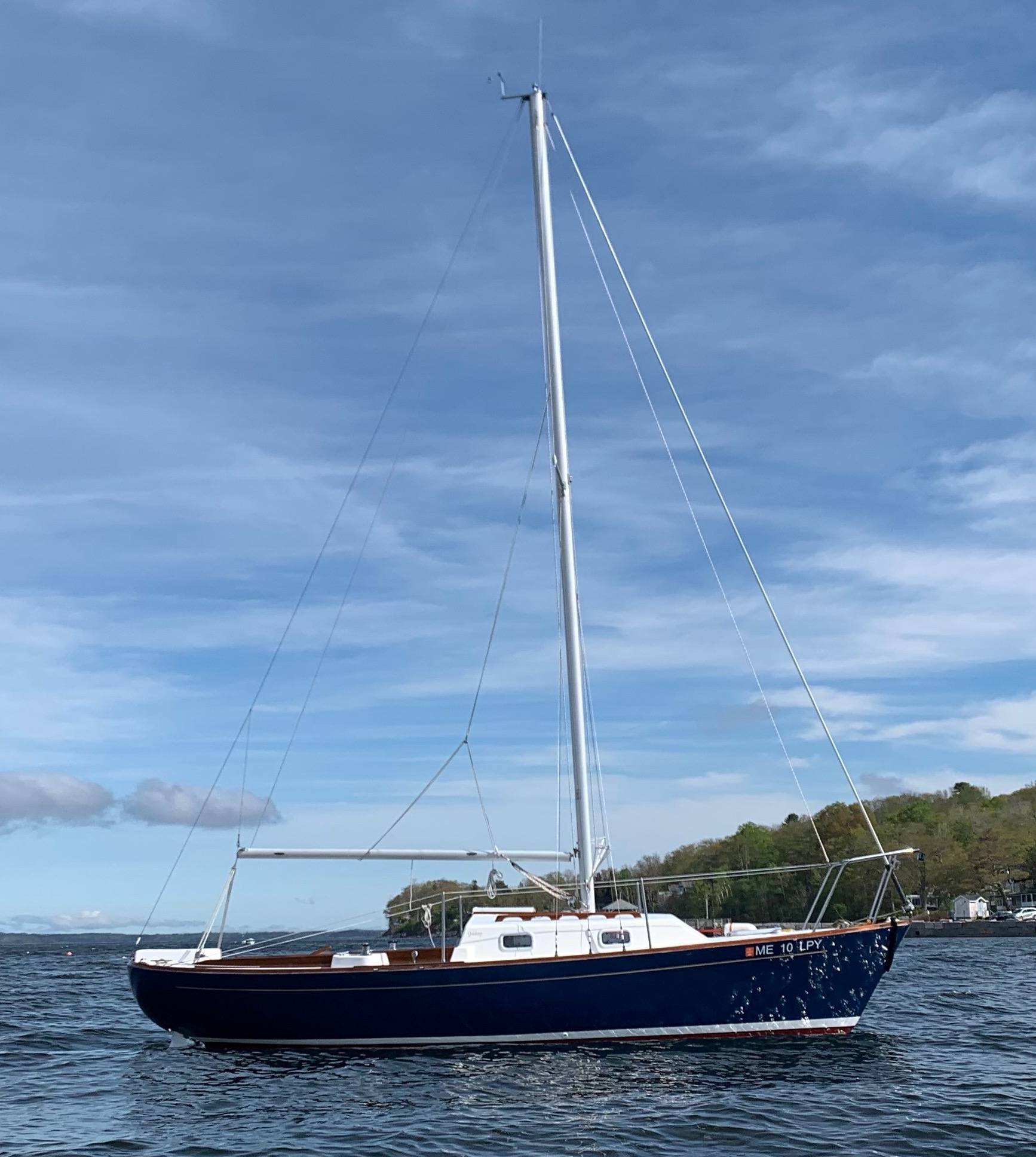

Development
- Designer: Edward S. Brewer
- Location: United States
- Year: 1976
- No. built: 200
- Builders: Stannard Boat Works; C.E. Ryder; The Anchorage; Shannon Yachts; Quickstep Sailboats
- Role: Cruiser
- Name: Quickstep 24

Boat
- Displacement: 4,000 lb (1,814 kg)
- Draft: 3.37 ft (1.03 m)

Hull
- Type: monohull
- Construction: fiberglass
- LOA: 23.92 ft (7.29 m)
- LWL: 19.00 ft (5.79 m)
- Beam: 7.92 ft (2.41 m)
- Engine: outboard motor

Hull appendages
- Keel: fin keel
- Ballast: 1,900 lb (862 kg)
- Rudder: skeg-mounted rudder

Rig
- Rig type: Bermuda rig
- I foretriangle height: 28.30 ft (8.63 m)
- J foretriangle base: 9.50 ft (2.90 m)
- P mainsail luff: 25.00 ft (7.62 m)
- E mainsail foot: 10.00 ft (3.05 m)

Sails
- Sailplan: masthead sloop
- Mainsail area: 125.00 sq ft (11.613 m^{2})
- Jib/genoa area: 134.43 sq ft (12.489 m^{2})
- Total sail area: 259.43 sq ft (24.102 m^{2})

Racing
- PHRF: 258

The Quickstep 24 is a recreational keelboat with a masthead sloop rig. About 200 boats were completed by several builders from 1976 to 1989.

== Design ==
It was designed by Edward S. Brewer to be built with an aluminum hull, but production hulls were built of fiberglass with a raked stem, a rounded transom, a skeg-mounted rudder controlled by a tiller and a fixed fin keel.

It displaces 4,000 lb (1,814 kg) and carries 1,900 lb (862 kg) of cast lead ballast. The boat has a draft of 3.37 ft (1.03 m) with the standard keel.

The boat is normally fitted with a small 4 to 6 hp (3 to 4 kW) outboard motor mounted in a stern well, for docking and maneuvering.

The design has sleeping accommodation for either two or four people, depending on version. Early production boats had just a double "V"-berth in the bow cabin and a main cabin seat with the head located underneath it. On these early configuration boats the galley is located on the port side just forward of the companionway ladder and is equipped with a single-burner stove, a built-in icebox and a sink. Later boats added two main cabin quarter berths, at the expense of the gallery space and moved the head under the bow "V"-berth insert. On later boats the galley is just aft of the bow cabin and has a sink on the starboard side and ice box to port. In all cases, the cabin headroom is 53 in (135 cm).

The design has a PHRF racing average handicap of 258 and a hull speed of 5.8 kn (10.7 km/h).

In a 2010 review Steve Henkel wrote, "this good-looking vessel made the rounds among several builders ... The boats were (with some exceptions) well built and well finished. Early accommodations were finished [with only a bow cabin, while] later production added quarter berths, which squeezed the galley space. Best features: With her longish keel and attached rudder, she wants to track a straight course and can be made to self-steer fairly easily, helping to make her a good singlehander. She is reported to handle a chop and a fresh breeze better than the average 24-footer. Her cockpit is large and comfortable. Worst features: Making a quick sharp turns may require an assist from the outboard (the other side of the coin from good tracking ability). Some owners (the ones with the quarter berths) complain of cramped accommodations."
