= Newport, California =

Unincorporated community in California, United States

Newport
- Unincorporated community
- Location in California Newport (the United States)
- Coordinates: 39°34′39″N 123°46′29″W
- Country: United States
- State: California
- County: Mendocino
- Elevation: 135 ft (41 m)

Newport is an unincorporated community in Mendocino County, California, United States. It is located on California State Route 1 near the Pacific Ocean, 4.25 miles (6.8 km) south of Westport, at an elevation of 135 feet (41 m).

Newport shipped lumber in prior times.

== Notable people ==
- Steve Birnbaum (b. 1991) – soccer player
- Dakota Prukop (b. 1993) – gridiron football player
