= Day sailer =

Small boat designed for sailing

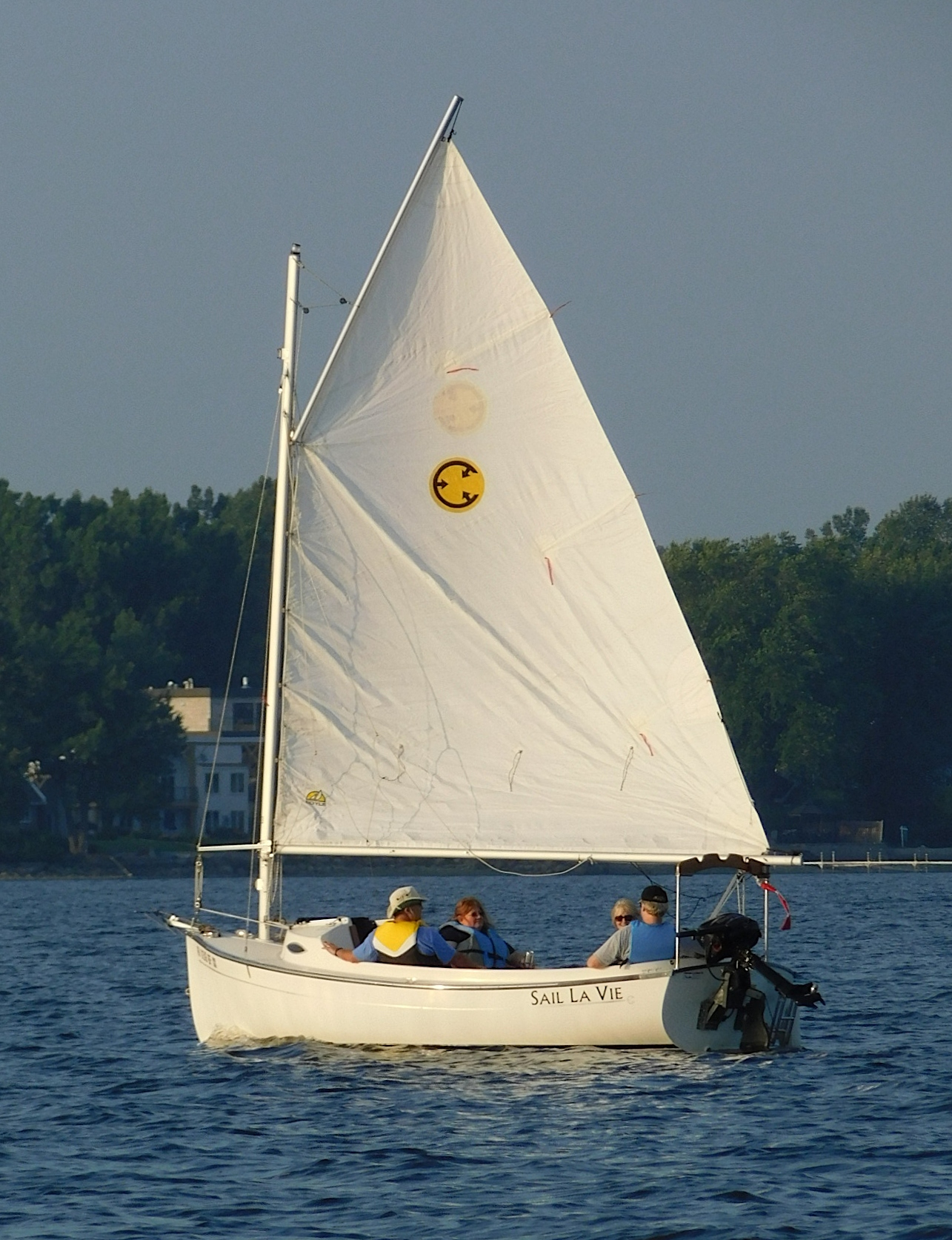
Com-Pac Sunday Cat daysailer

A daysailer, day sailer, or dayboat is a small compact sailboat with or without sleeping accommodations but which is larger than a dinghy. Dayboats can be monohull or multihull, and are typically trailer-able. Many dayboats have a small cabin or "cuddy" for storage and to provide shelter, or for sleeping in, but which is not always large enough to stand erect in.

Dayboats' greater stability also distinguishes them from dinghies and are generally sailed more like a small yacht than a dinghy. For example, although crew weight may well be shifted to increase performance, this is not crucial to stability, as it is in a dinghy. The distinction between keelboats and day sailers is not always clear. Generally a keelboat is a large boat (over 27 feet (8.2m) and usually not trailer-able) used for longer trips, whereas daysailers, as the name implies, are used for trips less than 48 hours, often only a single day.
