= Boat trailer =

Device that moves a boat

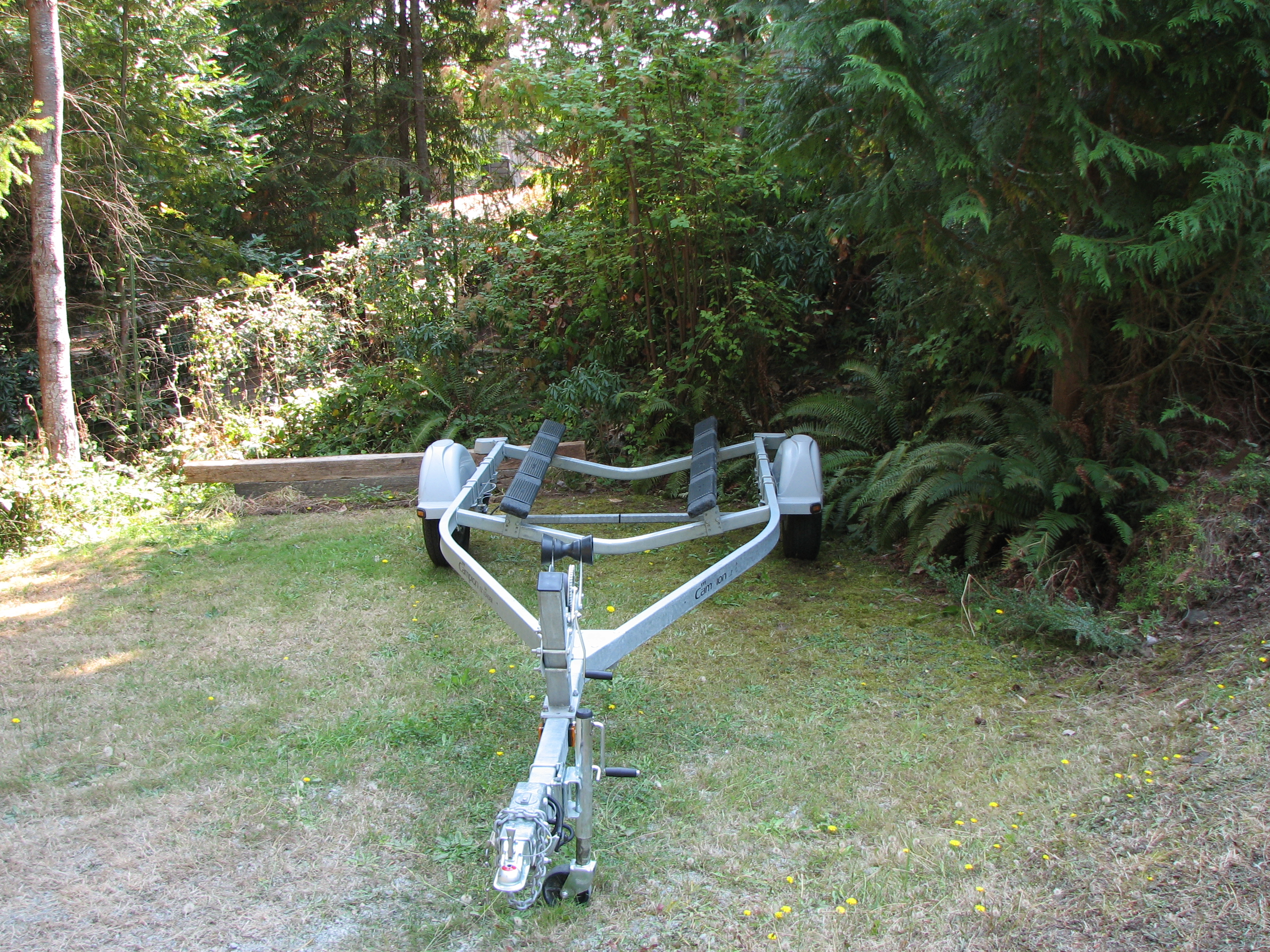
An empty boat trailer

A boat trailer is a trailer designed to launch, retrieve, carry and sometimes store boats, so the boat can be road-transported around by towing behind a motor vehicle. When launching and retrieving the boat, the trailer is often submerged in water via a boat ramp, so the boat can winched on and off the trailer in a controlled fashion by still maintaining buoyancy while changing the draught. As of 2024, the cost of a boat trailer can be anywhere between $700 and $8000, depending on the size and number of axles the trailer has.

== Commercial boat trailers ==
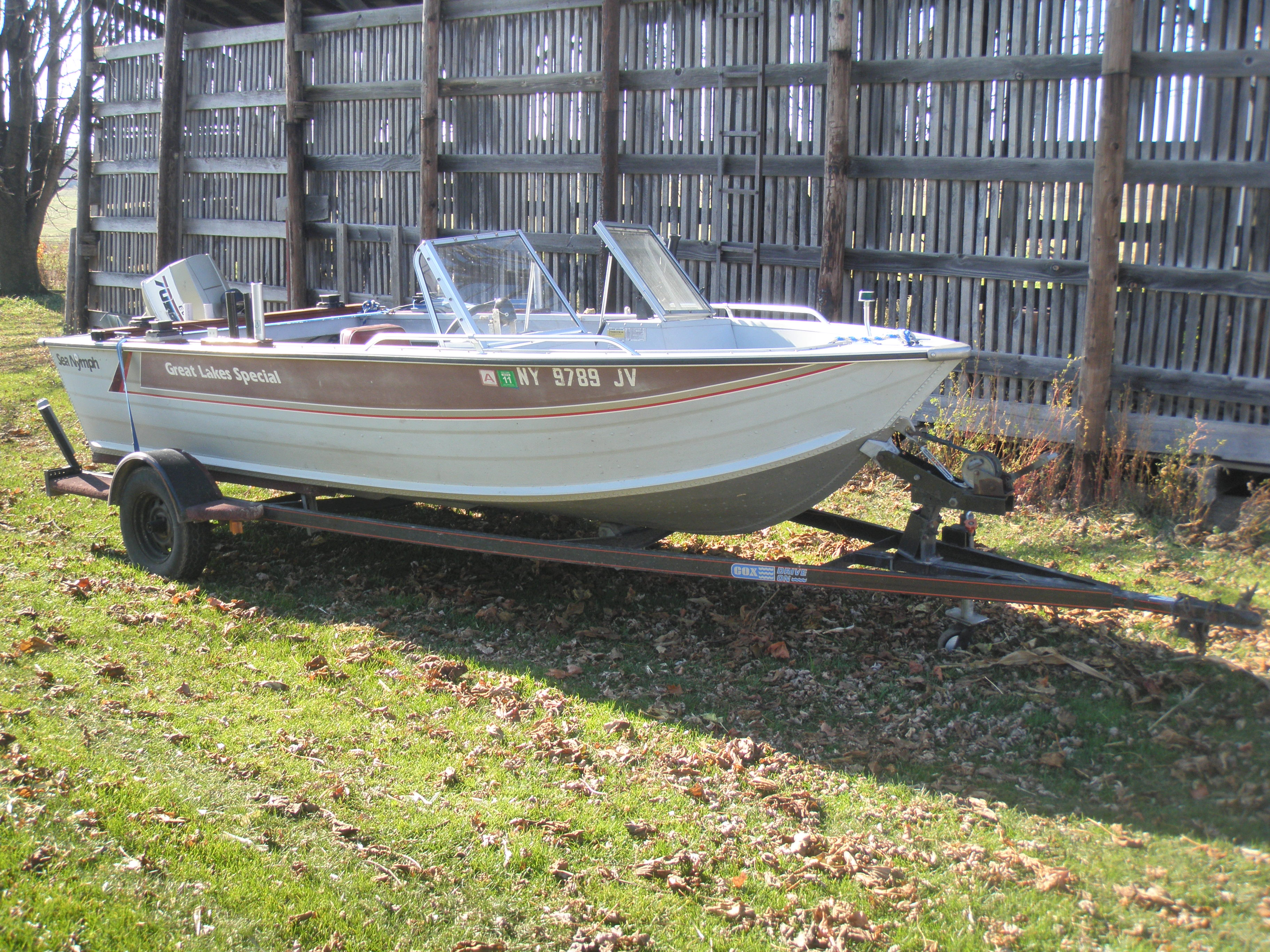
Lowe Boats Sea Nymph Great Lakes Special 16 foot recreational fishing boat

Commercial hydraulic boat trailers are used by marinas, boat yards, boat haulers, boat dealers and boat builders. Generally, this type of trailer is not used for boat storage.

=== Self-propelled ===
Self-propelled boat movers are not strictly trailers, but hydraulically operated boat movers, with their own tractor unit. They share all of the features of hydraulic boat trailers.

== Non-commercial boat trailers ==
This type of trailer is usually used by the boat owner/operator. The trailer is also used for storage.

- Roll-on, also known as a "Roller style trailer", uses rubber and/or polyurethane rollers for ease of launching and loading a boat.
- Glide-path, also known as a "Float-on style trailer", allows the boat to float onto the trailer; after the trailer has been partially submerged (usually 3/4 of the trailer). Since its inception, it has become quite popular compared to the "Roller style trailer".

== See also ==
- Boat dolly, a device for launching small boats not suitable for towing.
- Dolly (trailer)
- Flatbed trolley
- Maritime shipping Roll trailer
- Trailer sailer
