= Montgomery 17 =

1970s US recreational keelboat

- M17

Development
- Designer: Lyle Hess
- Location: United States
- Year: 1973
- Builders: Montgomery Marine Products; Nor'Sea Yachts; Montgomery Boats
- Role: Day sailer-cruiser
- Name: Montgomery 17

Boat
- Displacement: 1,400 lb (635 kg)
- Draft: 3.50 ft (1.07 m) with swing keel down

Hull
- Type: monohull
- Construction: fiberglass
- LOA: 17.08 ft (5.21 m)
- LWL: 15.83 ft (4.82 m)
- Beam: 7.33 ft (2.23 m)
- Engine: outboard motor

Hull appendages
- Keel: shoal keel and centerboard
- Ballast: 550 lb (249 kg)
- Rudder: transom-mounted rudder

Rig
- Rig type: Bermuda rig

Sails
- Sailplan: masthead sloop
- Total sail area: 154.00 sq ft (14.307 m^{2})

Racing
- PHRF: 294

The Montgomery 17 is a recreational keelboat built by Montgomery Marine Products, Nor'Sea Yachts and Montgomery Boats in the United States.

The boat was built in conventional cruiser and flush deck daysailer models.

== Design Overview ==
The Montgomery 17 is built predominantly of fiberglass, with wood trim. It has a masthead sloop rig, a nearly-plumb stem, a vertical transom, a transom-hung rudder controlled by a tiller. A few early boats had a fixed keel or a swing keel, while the standard production boats featured a shoal keel and centerboard combination.

Early cast iron fixed keel boats were ballasted at 400 lb (181 kg). The shoal keel with cast iron centerboard versions have 550 lb (249 kg) of combined ballast. The boats with lead ballast in shoal keel and centerboard have 600 lb (272 kg) of ballast.

The boat has a draft of 3.50 ft (1.07 m) with the keel extended and 1.75 ft (0.53 m) with it retracted, allowing operation in shallow water or ground transportation on a trailer.

The boat is normally fitted with a small 2 to 6 hp (1 to 4 kW) outboard motor for docking and maneuvering.

The conventional design has sleeping accommodation for three people, with a double "V"-berth in the cabin bow and a straight settee berth on the starboard side of the main cabin stretching below the cockpit. The galley is located on the port side just forward of the companionway. The galley cabinet is equipped with a moulded sink, a shelf for a stove and storage below. The head is located in under aft port side of the "V"-berth. Cabin headroom is 54 in (137 cm). In the late 1970s a factory option allowed installation of a fourth cabin berth in place of the galley

For sailing downwind the design may be equipped with a symmetrical spinnaker.

The design has a PHRF racing average handicap of 294 and a hull speed of 5.3 kn (9.8 km/h).

== Design history ==
Jerry Montgomery wrote that, "When I had Lyle Hess design the 17 I gave him about 6 months worth of sketches, indicating what I wanted the boat to be like. In my sketches I drew it both as a fixed keel, similar to the Cal 20, which was a very popular boat in Southern California at that time, and as a keel centerboarder. Lyle Hess talked me out of the keel centerboard concept and wanted a drop keel [swing keel], similar to the Ventures, Catalina 22, and the Balboa 20, and designed a threaded rod setup to raise it rather than the trailing wire like the others. His motivation was that he thought of the Montgomery 17 as a smaller, cheaper version of the Balboa 20, which is a good boat, but I was not excited about making a price boat. He wasn't excited about the keel/centerboard because of concerns about righting moment, and the knowledge that the drop keel would sit a bit lower on the trailer, which was a help in launching. The drop[swing] keel doesn't have the ballast weight as low as a typical drop keel but it's close enough that the advantages far outweigh the disadvantage, at least in my mind. That's why we initially went with the drop[swing] keel.

"We first built the 17 with the cast iron fixed keel, then finished the tooling for the drop[swing] keel version and made about 20 of those, but I really wasn't happy with it. It took a lot of muscle and too much time to raise, and at speed there was a lot of sound and a lot of drag coming from the void (for the keel) in the bottom of the boat. I browbeat Lyle into refining the keel/CB that I had originally intended and retooled again. The shoal keel centerboard version was a real success."

== Variants ==
Montgomery 17 - keel with centerboard
This model was designed by Lyle Hess and introduced in 1973. It has a length overall of 17.08 ft (5.2 m), a waterline length of 15.83 ft (4.8 m), displaces 1,400 lb (635 kg) and carries 400 to 600 lb (181 to 272 kg) of ballast. The boat has a draft of 3.50 ft (1.07 m) with the keel down and 1.75 ft (0.53 m) with it retracted.
Montgomery 17 - fixed fin keel
A few of the early boats were designed with a deep fin cast iron keel with a bulb. A fiberglass fin keel version was built in the late 1980s and early 1990s. As with the early cast iron fin boats only a few were manufactured. The fin keel hull, deck and cabin are identical to the shoal keel with centerboard boats.
Montgomery 17 - swing keel
Another early version of the 17 had a heavy swing keel with no shoal keel. The keel is raised/lowered using a worm gear with a crank in the cabin. A trunk in the cabin houses the keel.
Montgomery 17 Flush Deck
This flush deck model was designed by Lyle Hess and Jerry Montgomery and introduced in 1975. Only nine were built. The FD boats have a tall mast 1.75 feet longer. The hull is identical to the standard 17 with the length overall of 17.08 ft (5.2 m), a waterline length of 15.83 ft (4.8 m), displaces 1,350 lb (612 kg) and carries 500 lb (227 kg) of ballast. The boat has a draft of 3.50 ft (1.07 m) with the swing keel down and 1.75 ft (0.53 m) with it retracted.

== Reception ==
Montgomery 17s are recognized as safe and seaworthy pocket cruisers with yearly coastal passages on both the Eastern and Western United States. Common locations are Washington State's San Juan Islands, Canada's Gulf Islands, California's Channel and Catalina Islands and the Florida Keys. One highly modified M17, Strawanza, sailed from California across the Pacific to the island of Vanuatu in the South Pacific.

In a 2010 review Steve Henkel wrote of the design, "best features: As with her little 15-foot sister [the Montgomery 15], we like her looks. She displays a good level of attention to detail in her construction, Worst features: With the same under body design as the Montgomery 15, compared to her comp[etitor]s she will have the same penalties. That is, she'll be harder to handle at the launching ramp and give poorer performance upwind."
