= Nor'Sea 27 =

Sailboat class

Development
- Designer: Lyle Hess
- Location: United States
- Year: 1976
- No. built: 450
- Builder: Nor'Sea Marine
- Role: Cruiser
- Name: Nor'Sea 27

Boat
- Displacement: 8,100 lb (3,674 kg)
- Draft: 3.50 ft (1.07 m)

Hull
- Type: monohull
- Construction: fiberglass
- LOA: 27.00 ft (8.23 m)
- LWL: 23.00 ft (7.01 m)
- Beam: 8.00 ft (2.44 m)
- Engine: Faryman 9 hp (7 kW) diesel engine

Hull appendages
- Keel: modified long keel
- Ballast: 3,100 lb (1,406 kg)
- Rudder: keel/transom-mounted rudder

Rig
- Rig type: Bermuda rig
- I foretriangle height: 29.50 ft (8.99 m)
- J foretriangle base: 12.50 ft (3.81 m)
- P mainsail luff: 30.80 ft (9.39 m)
- E mainsail foot: 11.80 ft (3.60 m)

Sails
- Sailplan: masthead sloop
- Mainsail area: 181.72 sq ft (16.882 m^{2})
- Jib/genoa area: 184.38 sq ft (17.129 m^{2})
- Total sail area: 366.10 sq ft (34.012 m^{2})

The Nor'Sea 27, or Norsea 27, is an American trailerable sailboat that was designed by Lyle Hess as cruiser and first built in 1976.

== Production ==
The design was built by Heritage Marine, later renamed Nor'Sea Marine, in Dana Point, California, United States. Production was started in 1976, with 450 boats built, but it is now out of production.

The boats were sold complete and ready to sail and also as kits for amateur completion.

== Design ==
Hess designed the boat in response to a specification by Dean Wixom, president of Heritage Marine, who was looking for a trailerable boat that could handle almost any ocean weather. Hess based the configuration on the traditional lines of the Norwegian Spitzgatter.

The Nor'Sea 27 is a recreational keelboat, built predominantly of fiberglass, with wood trim and a plywood-cored deck. It has a masthead sloop rig with a bowsprit, a spooned raked stem, a rounded transom, a keel and transom-hung rudder controlled by a tiller and a fixed long keel with a cutaway forefoot. It displaces 8,100 lb (3,674 kg). Until 1980 a choice of 2,500 or 3,000 lb (1,134 or 1,361 kg) of ballast was available. After 1980 ballast was standardized at 3,100 lb (1,406 kg).

The hull design is 27.00 ft (8.23 m) long or 31.00 ft (9.45 m) with the bowsprit.

A tall mast of 34.5 ft (10.5 m) with 376 sq ft (34.9 m^{2}) of sail, as well as a short mast of 30.5 ft (9.3 m) and 335 sq ft (31.1 m^{2}) of sail, were available.

The boat has a draft of 3.50 ft (1.07 m) with the standard long keel.

The boat is fitted with a Faryman diesel engine of 9 hp (7 kW) or a Yanmar 2GM diesel of 20 hp (15 kW) for docking and maneuvering. The fuel tank holds 27 U.S. gallons (100 L; 22 imp gal) and the fresh water tank has a capacity of 50 U.S. gallons (190 L; 42 imp gal).

The design has two cabin configurations, both with sleeping accommodation for four people. The center cockpit-aft cabin version has a double berth aft and a drop down dinette table that converts to a double berth in the bow. The aft cockpit configuration has a bow cabin and two berths aft, under the cockpit. Both have a galley located on the starboard side just forward of the companionway ladder, equipped with a two-burner stove and a sink. The head is located opposite the galley on the port side. The cabin has 71 in (180 cm) of headroom.

== Operational history ==
A review in Blue Water Boats noted, "the Nor'Sea 27 is a small but rugged pocket-cruiser with live-aboard comfort and seaworthiness at the heart of her design. Designer Lyle Hess was approached with the challenging brief to design a heavy weather, long distance cruiser which could be legally trailerable. Unfazed, Hess came up with this tough and traditionally styled 27-foot double-ender which is transportable between oceans if not strictly trailerable."

== See also ==
- List of sailing boat types

Related development

- Bristol Channel Cutter
- Falmouth Cutter 26
- Nor'Sea 37
