= Lin and Larry Pardey =

American sailors

Lin Pardey (born 1944) and Larry Pardey (1939–2020) are sailors and writers, known for their small boat sailing. They coined the phrase, "Go Small, Go Simple, but Go Now", and have been called the "Enablers" as their example encouraged many others to set sail despite limited incomes. The Pardeys sailed over 200,000 miles together, circumnavigating the world both east-about and west-about, and have published numerous books on sailing. The boats they sailed during these circumnavigations were engine-free.

== Early life ==
Larry was born October 31, 1939, in Victoria, British Columbia, and Lin was born 1944 in Detroit, Michigan. Larry Pardey met Lin Zatkin in May 1965 in California. The couple married in 1968.

== Sailing voyages ==
The Pardeys have sailed, contrary to the prevailing wind, past all the great southern capes, including Cape Horn. Larry and Lin built the two boats they used for two circumnavigations; both were under 30 feet and were designed by Lyle Hess. Neither boat had an engine.

Larry also was one of the first people to sail across the Sahara in 1967. In an expedition organized by the French Colonel de Buchett and sponsored by National Geographic among others, he captained a North American team of three, including Richard Arthur and Warren Zeibarth, as they sailed land yachts from Colum Bechar in Algeria to Noachott in Mauritania, a distance of approximately 1700 miles. For this, each was awarded the Mauritanian Legion of Honor. In 1974, he joined 67-year-old Leslie Dyball to take handicap honors in the bi-annual Round Britain and Ireland two-handed race on board the 30-foot S&S sloop Chough.

== Later life ==
In 2009, the Pardeys made their last ocean passage together from California to Tonga and New Zealand. Larry had already developed Parkinson's disease by this time. Thus, their cruising was confined to the coast of New Zealand. In 2016, with Larry no longer able to move without assistance, Lin sold their 29'9" Hess cutter, Taleisin, to a young New Zealand couple who, within two years, voyaged to Tonga and continued to live on board her once back in New Zealand. Larry went into an assisted living facility in 2017. Lin continued sailing as crew of Sahula, a steel Van de Stadt cutter owned by David Haigh, an Australian retired environmental law lecturer who was, at the time of their meeting, completing an 11-year circumnavigation. During the next three years, between visits back to ensure Larry was getting the best possible care, she logged another 20,000 miles voyaging to Fiji, Vanuatu and along the coast of Australia and south of Tasmania to return to her home in New Zealand.

Larry died on July 27, 2020.

Friends of Larry Pardey contributed to a fund to create a Memorial Observatory and Shelter area at Camp Bentzon, directly across the cove from the home Larry and Lin built on Kawau Island. Each year, over 5,000 school children visit this non-denominational outdoor recreation facility for week-long adventure programs. This was dedicated in April 2022 with a plaque that reads:

Larry's place – outdoors, warm and friendly

Made possible by friends of Larry Pardey

In 2023 as she approached her 80th year, Lin continued voyaging with David Haigh, sailing from New Zealand to New Caledonia then on to Vanuatu during the southern hemisphere winter of 2023. During that voyage she completed work on her newest book, Passages: Cape Horn and Beyond. The book was published in late 2024, the 7th in her cruising narrative series, and 13th book of her career.

== Publications ==
In January 2014, As Long as It's Fun: The Epic Voyages and Extraordinary Times of Lin and Larry Pardey, a biography written by Herb McCormick, was released by Paradise Cay Publications.

== Awards ==
The Cruising Club of America awarded their 2009 Far Horizon Award to Lin and Larry in recognition of their combined voyaging on board many boats covering mileage totaling more than 200,000 for Larry and about 194,000 for Lin and doing so in a manner that is consistent with the goals of the CCA. They were presented with the SSCA award from the Seven Seas Cruising Association in recognition of their contributions to the sport of sailing and the cruising community – only the 16th time in the club's 60-year history the award has been presented.

- Mauritanian Legion of Honour, as Captain of first American team to sail across the Sahara Desert in a land yacht 1967.
- Outstanding Sailor of the year – West Vancouver Yacht Club 1978
- French Sailing Federation – Silver medal, Landyachting 1967
- Cruising Sailors to contribute most to the sport of Sailing – voted by readers of Sail Magazine 1990.
- International Oceanic Award – presented by Royal Institute of Navigation sponsored by Little Ship Club 1995 - in recognition of Larry's voyaging using traditional methods of navigation.
- Larry won the International Oceanic Award from the Royal Institute of Navigation in 1996, and was presented this honour by the Princess Royal, Princess Anne in 1997.
- Ocean Cruising Club Award – for contributions to Seamanship for small boat sailing. Presented to Lin Pardey 1996.
- Geoff Pac Memorial Award – to both Lin and Larry for fostering and encouraging ocean cruising in small yachts 1998 and 2001
- Cruising World Hall of Fame – 2000
- Ocean Cruising Club Merit Award – To Lin and Larry for inspiring voyages including a west-about rounding of Cape Horn 2003
- Seven Seas Cruising Club Service Award – To Lin and Larry for their lifetime voyaging achievements 2004
- Cruising Club of America Far Horizons Award – To Lin and Larry for lifetime achievements and contributions to seamanship 2009
- Sail Magazines Top 40 Sailors who made a Difference–2010- Citation – As America's first couple of cruising, Lin and Larry have inspired countless sailors.
- Yachting Monthly – 25 Cruising Heroes Only non-British sailors chosen. March 2012
- Seven Seas Cruising Association – SSCA Award for contributions to the sailing community October 2015
- BoatUS – Leaders and Legends 2016 – Named among 50 people who made a difference to the world of boating
- Ocean Cruising Club 2019 – lifetime achievement award
- 2022 Inducted into the U.S. National Sailing Hall of Fame
- 2024 - International Cruisers Awards - Lifetime achievement award presented by Young Cruisers Association

== Bibliography ==
=== Books ===
- Cruising in Seraffyn ISBN 0-901281-04-2
- Seraffyn's European Adventure ISBN 0-9646036-4-0
- Seraffyn's Mediterranean Adventure ISBN 0-924486-15-5
- Seraffyn's Oriental Adventure ISBN 0-9646036-3-2
- Storm Tactics Handbook ISBN 978-1-929214-47-1
- The Cost Conscious Cruiser ISBN 0-9646036-5-9
- The Self Sufficient Sailor ISBN 0-9646036-7-5
- The Capable Cruiser ISBN 0-9646036-2-4
- The Care and Feeding of Sailing Crew ISBN 0-9646036-0-8
- Details of Classic Boat Construction: The Hull ISBN 0-9646036-8-3
- Bull Canyon, a Boatbuilder, a Writer and Other Wildlife ISBN 978-1-929214-67-9 Willa Cather Literary Award, Creative non-fiction 2012 - finalist Indie Book Awards - General Non-Fiction, also Memoirs
- Taleisin's Tales, Cruising Towards the Southern Cross ISBN 978-1-929214-11-2
- Passages: Cape Horn and Beyond ISBN 978-1-929214-80-8

=== VHS tapes ===
- Cruising Coral Seas
- Cruising with Lin and Larry Pardey
- Voyaging with Lin and Larry Pardey
- The Care and Feeding of Sailing Crew
- Storm Tactics

=== DVD ===
- Cruising Has No Limits ISBN 1-929214-17-0
- Get Ready to Cruise
- Get Ready to Cross Oceans
- Storm Tactics
- Cost Control While You Cruise
