= SSCA =

SSCA may refer to:

== Organisations ==
- Safe Schools Coalition Australia, a former national network of organisations working with school communities
- Seven Seas Cruising Association, an international organization for cruisers based in the US
- State Secretariat of Civil Aviation, the civil aviation agency of Cambodia
- Shining Stone Community Action, a Beijing-based organization whose mission is to engage citizens in public decision making
- Springdale School Community Association, of the Springdale School, a building in Springdale, Oregon, US
- Safe Sane Consensual Adults, which merged with the National Leather Association International

== Other uses ==
- Single-strand conformation analysis, see bisulfite sequencing
