= Amphibi-Con 25 =

Sailboat class

Development
- Designer: E. Farnham Butler and Cyrus Hamlin
- Location: United States
- Year: 1954
- No. built: 125
- Builders: Mount Desert Yachts; Sailstar Boat Company; Burr Brothers Boats
- Role: Racer-Cruiser
- Name: Amphibi-Con 25

Boat
- Displacement: 3,500 lb (1,588 kg)
- Draft: 4.25 ft (1.30 m) with centerboard down

Hull
- Type: monohull
- Construction: wood strip or fiberglass
- LOA: 25.42 ft (7.75 m)
- LWL: 21.67 ft (6.61 m)
- Beam: 7.75 ft (2.36 m)
- Engine: outboard motor

Hull appendages
- Keel: modified long keel and centerboard
- Ballast: 1,100 lb (499 kg)
- Rudder: keel-mounted rudder

Rig
- Rig type: Bermuda rig
- I foretriangle height: 24.00 ft (7.32 m)
- J foretriangle base: 9.50 ft (2.90 m)
- P mainsail luff: 26.75 ft (8.15 m)
- E mainsail foot: 12.17 ft (3.71 m)

Sails
- Sailplan: fractional rigged sloop
- Mainsail area: 162.77 sq ft (15.122 m^{2})
- Jib/genoa area: 114.00 sq ft (10.591 m^{2})
- Total sail area: 276.77 sq ft (25.713 m^{2})

Racing
- PHRF: 234

The Amphibi-Con 25, often just called the Amphibi-Con, is a recreational keelboat that was designed by E. Farnham Butler and Cyrus Hamlin as a racer-cruiser and first built in 1954. The design was one of the first "trailer sailers" and helped popularize this class of boat.

== Production ==
The design was built by Butler's Mount Desert Yachts, Sailstar Boat Company and Burr Brothers Boats in the United States, starting in 1954. Some were also built in Finland. A total of 125 boats were completed, but it is now out of production.

== Design ==
The Amphibi-Con 25 was initially built predominantly of glued wooden strip construction. In 1964 the Sailstar Boat Company constructed a mold and built some from fiberglass, with wood trim and these were sold as kits, semi-finished or ready-to-sail.

The boat has a fractional sloop rig, with a masthead sloop rig optional. The hull has a raked stem, a plumb transom, reverse sheer, a keel-mounted rudder controlled by a tiller and a fixed long keel with a cutaway forefoot, plus a retractable centerboard. The wooden version displaces 3,500 lb (1,588 kg) and carries 1,100 lb (499 kg) of lead ballast, while the fiberglass version displaces 4,000 lb (1,814 kg).

The boat has a draft of 4.25 ft (1.30 m) with the centerboard extended and 2.33 ft (0.71 m) with it retracted, allowing ground transportation on a trailer.

The boat is normally fitted with a small 6 to 10 hp (4 to 7 kW) outboard motor mounted in an aft lazarette well, for docking and maneuvering. The fuel tank is a portable type, while the fresh water tank has a capacity of 20 U.S. gallons (76 L; 17 imp gal).

The design includes a canvas-covered cabin that allows sunshine and fresh air in fine weather or covering in inclement weather. The boat has sleeping accommodation for four people, with a double "V"-berth in the bow cabin and two straight settees in the main cabin. The galley is located on both sides, just aft of the forward cabin. The galley is equipped with a two-burner stove on the starboard side and a sink and icebox on the port side. The head is located just aft of the bow cabin on the port side. Cabin headroom is 68 in (170 cm).

For sailing the design is equipped with a topping lift that runs from a V-shaped boomkin and may also be fitted with a spinnaker for downwind sailing.

The design has a PHRF racing average handicap of 234 and a hull speed of 6.2 kn (11.5 km/h).

== Operational history ==
The boat is supported by an active class club that organizes racing events, the Amphibi-con Association.

In a 2010 review Steve Henkel wrote, "among her comp[etitor]s, the A/C 25 is the lightest boat with the least ballast and close to the highest SA/D ratio, indicating that she will be among the liveliest in light air, but with her relatively low Motion Index, will tend to be jumpy in a seaway. We recall spending some time on one of these boats with another couple, and we found it to be comfortable, light, and airy."
