= Balboa 20 =

Sailboat class

Development
- Designer: Lyle C. Hess
- Location: United States
- Year: 1967
- Builders: Arthur Marine; Coastal Recreation, Inc
- Role: Cruiser
- Name: Balboa 20

Boat
- Displacement: 1,700 lb (771 kg)
- Draft: 4.42 ft (1.35 m) with keel down

Hull
- Type: monohull
- Construction: fiberglass
- LOA: 20.00 ft (6.10 m)
- LWL: 17.50 ft (5.33 m)
- Beam: 7.08 ft (2.16 m)
- Engine: outboard motor

Hull appendages
- Keel: swing keel
- Ballast: 450 lb (204 kg)
- Rudder: transom-mounted rudder

Rig
- Rig type: Bermuda rig
- I foretriangle height: 20.70 ft (6.31 m)
- J foretriangle base: 8.80 ft (2.68 m)
- P mainsail luff: 21.00 ft (6.40 m)
- E mainsail foot: 8.70 ft (2.65 m)

Sails
- Sailplan: masthead sloop
- Mainsail area: 91.35 sq ft (8.487 m^{2})
- Jib/genoa area: 91.08 sq ft (8.462 m^{2})
- Total sail area: 182.43 sq ft (16.948 m^{2})

Racing
- PHRF: 276

The Balboa 20 is an American trailerable sailboat that was designed by Lyle C. Hess as a cruiser, at the request of Richard Arthur and first built in 1967.

The success of the Balboa 20 allowed Hess to become a sailboat designer on a full-time basis.

The Balboa 20 hull design was used for two 1972 raised deck boats, the Ensenada 20 and the RK 20.

== Production ==
The design was built by Arthur Marine and Coastal Recreation, Inc in the United States, starting in 1967, but it is now out of production.

== Design ==
The design goals for the boat were low cost and good seaworthiness.

The Balboa 20 is a recreational keelboat, built predominantly of fiberglass, with wood trim. It has a fractional sloop rig, a spooned raked stem, an angled transom, with a lazarette, a transom-hung rudder controlled by a tiller and a lifting keel. It displaces 1,700 lb (771 kg) and carries 450 lb (204 kg) of cast iron ballast.

The boat has a draft of 4.42 ft (1.35 m) with the keel extended and 1.58 ft (0.48 m) with it retracted, allowing beaching or ground transportation on a trailer.

The boat is normally fitted with a small 3 to 6 hp (2 to 4 kW) outboard motor for docking and maneuvering.

The design has sleeping accommodation for four people, with a double "V"-berth in the bow cabin and two quarter berths in the main cabin. The galley is located on the starboard side just forward of the companionway ladder. The head is located under the bow cabin berth. Cabin headroom is 48 in (120 cm).

The design has a PHRF racing average handicap of 276 and a hull speed of 5.6 kn (10.4 km/h).

== Operational history ==
In 1977 it was reported that the designer's personal boat was a Balboa 20, named Genesis.

In a 2010 review Steve Henkel wrote, "Lyle Hess’s designs are usually thought to be prettier (or handsomer?) than most, but in this early design it is hard to see a clear distinction from many other trailer-sailers of the era. Worst features: The cast iron swing keel, weighing more than a quarter of the total boat and controlled by a winch in the cabin, is at best a maintenance headache and at worst could cause serious leakage in the hull due to strain."

== See also ==
- List of sailing boat types

Related development

- Balboa 16
- Balboa 21
- Balboa 22
- Balboa 23
- Balboa 24
- Ensenada 20
- RK 20
