= Falmouth Cutter 22 =

Sailboat class

Development
- Designer: Lyle C. Hess
- Location: United States
- Year: 1980
- No. built: 40
- Builders: Cape George Marine Works; Sam L. Morse Co.
- Name: Falmouth Cutter 22

Boat
- Displacement: 7,400 lb (3,357 kg)
- Draft: 3.50 ft (1.07 m)

Hull
- Type: Monohull
- Construction: Fiberglass
- LOA: 22.0 ft (6.7 m)
- LWL: 20.83 ft (6.35 m)
- Beam: 8.00 ft (2.44 m)
- Engine: Yanmar 7 hp (5 kW) diesel engine

Hull appendages
- Keel: long keel
- Ballast: 2,500 lb (1,134 kg)
- Rudder: transom-mounted rudder

Rig
- Rig type: Bermuda rig
- I foretriangle height: 28.17 ft (8.59 m)
- J foretriangle base: 12.83 ft (3.91 m)
- P mainsail luff: 25.17 ft (7.67 m)
- E mainsail foot: 11.92 ft (3.63 m)

Sails
- Sailplan: Cutter rig
- Mainsail area: 150.01 sq ft (13.936 m^{2})
- Jib/genoa area: 180.71 sq ft (16.789 m^{2})
- Total sail area: 330.72 sq ft (30.725 m^{2})

The Falmouth Cutter 22 (often just referred to as the Falmouth Cutter) is an American sailboat that was designed by Lyle C. Hess as a cruiser and first built in 1980. The design is based on the traditional British Falmouth work boat.

== Production ==
The design was built by Cape George Marine Works of Port Townsend, Washington and Sam L. Morse Co. of Costa Mesa, California, both in the United States. A total of 40 examples were completed, but it is now out of production.

== Design ==
The Falmouth Cutter 22 was derived from a boat called Renegade, which was larger and had a gaff rig. Larry Pardey asked Hess to design a similar, but smaller boat, with a Marconi rig and the prototype was named Seraffyn. This was followed by the larger Bristol Channel Cutter design.

The Falmouth Cutter 22 is a recreational keelboat, built predominantly of fiberglass, with wood trim. It has a cutter rig, a spooned plumb stem, a near-vertical transom, a transom-hung rudder controlled by a tiller and a fixed long keel. It displaces 7,400 lb (3,357 kg) and carries 2,500 lb (1,134 kg) of lead ballast.

While the design has a hull length on deck of 22.00 ft (6.71 m), the length with the bowsprit and boomkin is 30.50 ft (9.30 m). The boat has a draft of 3.50 ft (1.07 m) with the standard long keel.

The boat is fitted with a Japanese Yanmar diesel engine of 7 hp (5 kW). The fuel tank holds 15 U.S. gallons (57 L; 12 imp gal) and the fresh water tank has a capacity of 40 U.S. gallons (150 L; 33 imp gal).

Accommodations include two quarter berths which double as seats for the dinette table. The table can be slid aft under the cockpit when not required. The port-side galley includes a gimballed kerosene two-burner stove. The ice box is on the starboard side, as is the navigation station. The navigation station seat is a quarter berth. A double berth is found in the bow, along with the head. The design includes a forward opening hatch and fix bronze opening portlights.

The wood is all mahogany except the bowsprit, which is made from fir. The bowsprit protrudes 4.0 ft (1.2 m), allows headsail reefing and can be retracted to shorten the boat length.

Two halyard winches are fitted to the mast and four sheet winches are located in the cockpit for the jib and staysail.

The design has a hull speed of 6.12 kn (11.33 km/h).

== Operational history ==
In a review, Richard Sherwood described the boat, "this cutter is designed and built for cruising ... Beam is wide and displacement heavy. The keel is full and bilges are firm. Because of the wide beam there is a remarkable amount of space below."

In a review Peter Reuter wrote, "Her seaworthiness in heavy weather is legendary and the bowsprit allows the use of cruising spinnakers and large genoas which gives her remarkable light air performance for such a traditional boat ... Of course there are several downsides to all this. The Falmouth Cutter is expensive for such a small boat, used boats are also expensive and only a few come onto the market each year."

In a 2010 review Steve Henkel wrote, "one feature seen as a plus by owners is the boat’s trailerability, but with a towing package of 10,800 pounds a big truck is needed, which may not fit everyone's concept of feasibility ... All that wood, mostly varnished, will take a heap of loving care to maintain in the style most owners desire."

A 2015 review in Blue Water boats stated, "It’s said the best way to describe the performance of this diminutive cutter is to prepare yourself for a vessel that’s only 21 feet on the waterline, then be pleasantly surprised by the relative turn of speed, with the key word being "relative". True to design her seaworthiness in a blow is remarkable and, like most heavy displacement boats, she retains a slow easy motion in trade wind type sailing. She’ll also track well down the face of large swells. In lighter conditions, the bowsprit can be used to fly a cruising spinnaker or a large genoa which gives this tradition boat a surprising performance in light airs."

== See also ==
- List of sailing boat types

Related development

- Falmouth work boat
- Falmouth Cutter 26
- Falmouth Cutter 34
