= Falmouth working boat =

Cornish sailing craft

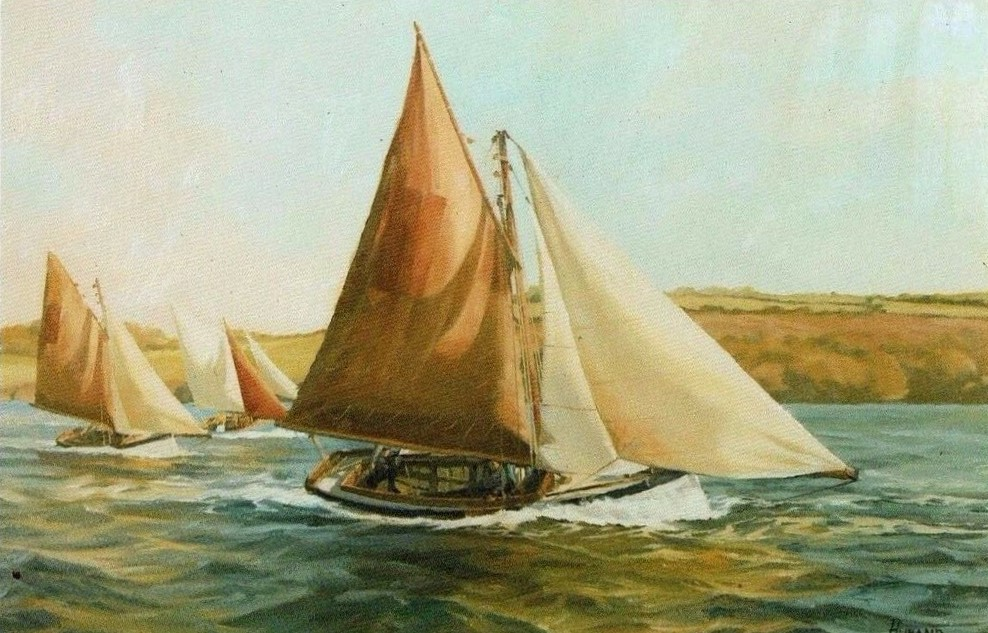
Falmouth Oyster Boats

The Falmouth Working Boat is a type of small traditional sailing craft that evolved for fishing in the waters of Falmouth, Cornwall.

Falmouth working boats have a gaff cutter rig and a long keel hull. As well as being general purpose fishing boats they have a specific function of dredging the native oysters (Ostrea edulis).

In the summer months they are intensively raced, forming a colourful spectacle in the Cornish inshore waters.

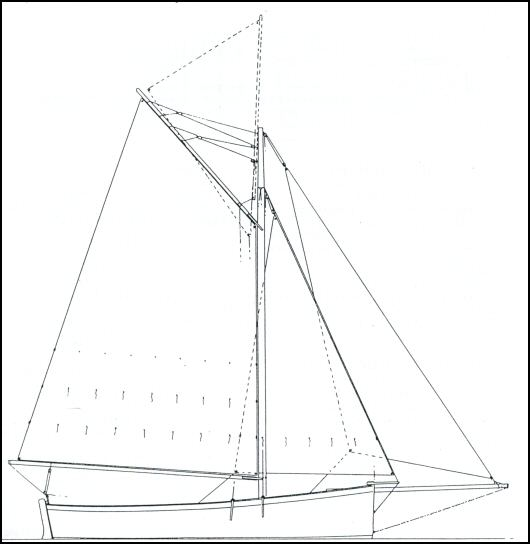
Sail Plan of a Falmouth Working Boat

== Design ==
Falmouth working boats range from about 22 feet (7 m) to 32 feet (10 m) long.

In its traditional form the boats have a hull with a plumb stem and almost vertical transom, with a long straight keel. Typically they are internally ballasted. The working boats have a three-quarter deck, with a small cuddy forward. The single mast is keel-stepped.

== Sails and rig ==
The mainsail is raised on a gaff. The staysail may be rigged to a bumkin which extends its foot past the stem head. The jib is hauled out on a long bowsprit, which is often tightened downwards with the bobstay giving it a slight curve. A topsail is frequently employed, which is raised on a yard rather than a topmast.

== Oyster fishery ==
Local bylaws prohibit the use of engines when dredging for oysters. The Falmouth fishing fleet is thus one of very few fleets in the world that routinely fish under sail alone.

Oysters are dredged from the sea bed using a small trawl or drudge, which is a weighted net that is towed along the bottom. Under sail this is accomplished by using the mainsail with a small jib slightly aback.

The boat's speed can be controlled by slacking or tightening the jib, while the skipper handles the drudges, and sorts out the recovered oysters.

== Races ==
In the summer months the oyster boats are raced against each other. The boats have brightly coloured topsails.

The overall season's winner receives the "Silver Oyster" prize.

== Notable Boats ==
- Alf Smythers - the most recent wooden working boat, designed by Percy Dalton.
- Shadow - the oldest working boat, built in 1884

== Yachts ==
Many Falmouth working boats have been converted for use as yachts, and the type has inspired many successful yacht designs.

The hull shape has good seakeeping qualities, and the size of the boat is practical for short handed cruising.

The Heard 23 and 28 designs were based on a Falmouth working boat designed by Percy Dalton, and these have become popular yachts, while the same GRP hulls are also used for fishing and racing in Falmouth.

== See also ==
- Falmouth Cutter 22
- Falmouth Quay Punt
- Polperro Gaffer
