= Montgomery Marine Products =

Sailboat manufacturer

- Company type: Privately held company
- Industry: Boat building
- Founded: 1969
- Founder: Jerry Montgomery
- Defunct: 1995
- Headquarters: Costa Mesa, California; Dana Point, California; Rancho Cordova, California; Sacramento, California, United States
- Key people: President: Jerry Montgomery
- Products: Sailboats and Dinghies

Montgomery Marine Products was an American boat builder based in California. The company specialized in the design and manufacture of fiberglass sailboats and dinghies.

The company was founded by Jerry Montgomery in 1969.

== History ==
The first design produced was the Montgomery 12 a sailing dinghy introduced in 1972. The largest boat built was the Lyle Hess-designed Montgomery 23. Reviewer Steve Henkel reported in 2010 that the company's quality of workmanship was "fairly high" and "above average" with a "good level of attention to detail". He described the 23 as "admirably shippy". The final design, the 1980 Montgomery 15, Henkel described as "graceful".

The company ceased operations in 1995, although many of its designs were taken up by other companies, in particular Nor'Sea Yachts and Montgomery Boats. Jerry Montgomery went on to form a sailboat rigging, racing kayak and outrigger canoe design company, which is now no longer in business. He also designed the Sage 17, Sage 15, and Sage Cat for Sage Marine in 2009–2018.

== Boats ==
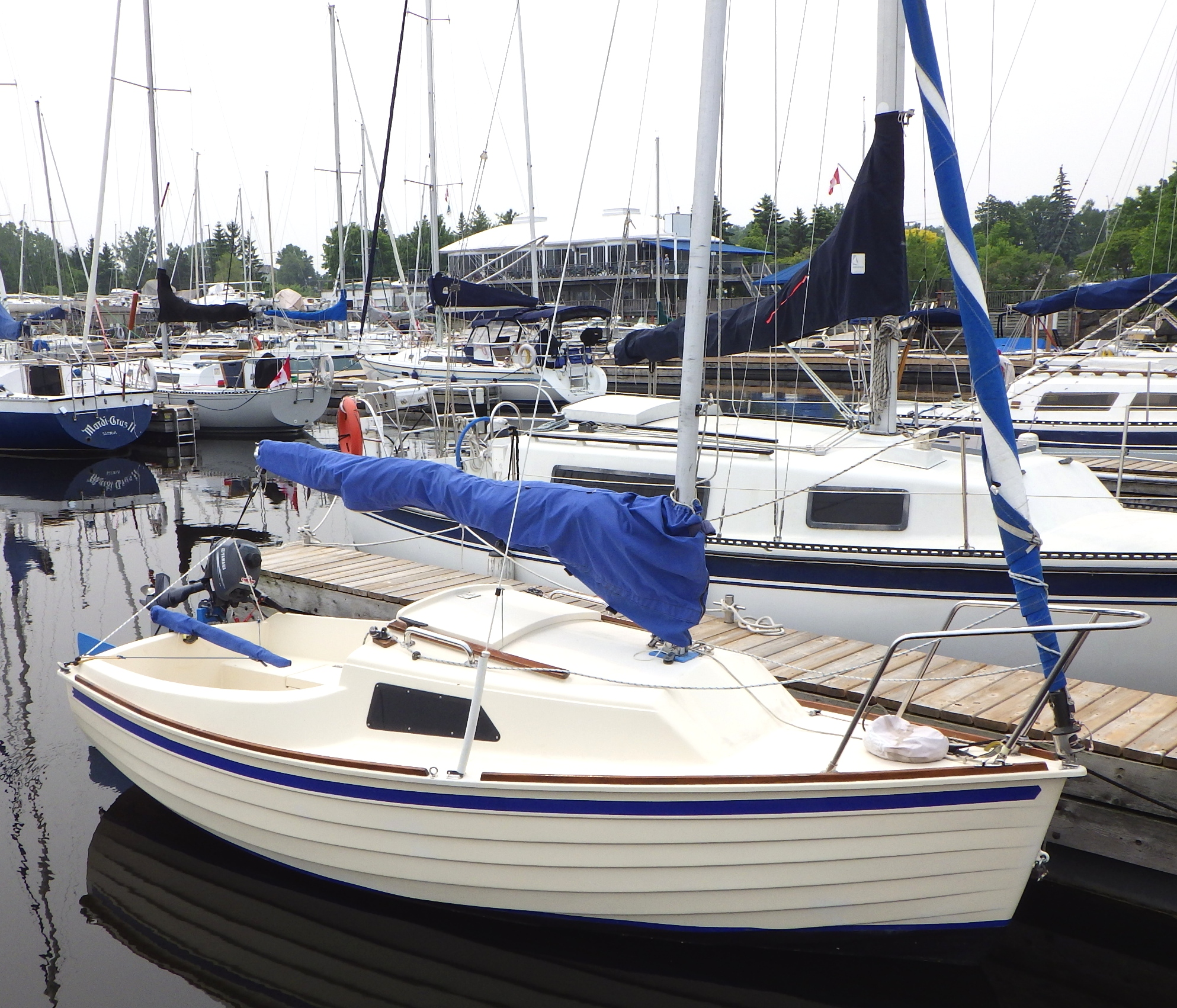
Montgomery 15

Summary of boats built by Montgomery Marine Products:

- Mongtomery 5'8" - unknown year
- Montgomery 6'8" - unknown year
- Montgomery 7-11 - unknown year
- Montgomery 10 - unknown year
- Montgomery 12 - 1972
- Montgomery Panther - unknown year
- Montgomery 17 - 1973
- Montgomery 17 FD - 1975
- Montgomery 23 - 1979
- Montgomery 15 - 1980

== See also ==
- List of sailboat designers and manufacturers
