= Bristol Channel Cutter =

Sailboat class

Development
- Designer: Lyle Hess
- Location: United States/Canada
- Year: 1976
- No. built: 129 (US), 30-45 (Canada)
- Builders: Sam L. Morse Co. Cape George Marine Works; Steveston Fiberglass/G & B Woodworks
- Role: Cruiser
- Name: Bristol Channel Cutter

Boat
- Displacement: 14,000 lb (6,350 kg)
- Draft: 4.83 ft (1.47 m)

Hull
- Type: monohull
- Construction: fiberglass
- LOA: 28.08 ft (8.56 m)
- LWL: 26.25 ft (8.00 m)
- Beam: 10.08 ft (3.07 m)
- Engine: Volvo MD 7A 13 hp (10 kW) diesel engine

Hull appendages
- Keel: long keel
- Ballast: 4,600 lb (2,087 kg)
- Rudders: transom and keel-mounted rudder

Rig
- Rig type: Cutter rig

Sails
- Sailplan: Cutter rigged sloop
- Total sail area: 673.00 sq ft (62.524 m^{2})

The Bristol Channel Cutter, also called the Bristol Channel Cutter 28, is an American sailboat that was designed by Lyle Hess as a "character boat" cruiser and first built in 1976.

The boat is based upon Hess's earlier Renegade design.

== Production ==
The design was built by Sam L. Morse Co. of Costa Mesa, California, United States, who completed 128 boats between 1976 and 2007. In 2011 one boat was built by Cape George Marine Works in Port Townsend, Washington. Between 30 and 45 boats were also built in Vancouver, British Columbia, Canada, by two companies. The hulls were built by Steveston Fiberglass and the finish work performed by G & B Woodworks.

There are reports of royalties not being paid to Lyle Hess and Sam L. Morse for the construction of the Canadian hulls.

The rumor is a result of confusion over Hull Identification Numbers (HIN). At the time the Canadian Bristol Channel Cutter hulls were built, Canada did not require HINs and this resulted in a number of Bristol Channel Cutters without HINs. This lack of accountability for the hulls led to disagreements with Sam L. Morse, which amongst other reasons, led to them rescinding their license to Steveston Fiberglass and Canadian production was then stopped.

The company often mentioned in these rumors, Channel Cutter Yachts, has never produced a Bristol Channel Cutter, but the owner, Bryan Gittins, is the G from G & B Woodworks who originally finished the Canadian hulls. G & B Woodworks dissolved with the ending of Bristol Channel Cutter production. Sometime after this Gittens purchased the rights to Lyle Hess's Falmouth Cutter 34 design and setup shop as Channel Cutter Yachts in order to produce this new design.

== Design ==
The Bristol Channel Cutter is a recreational keelboat, built predominantly of fiberglass, with wood trim. It has a cutter rig, a spooned plumb stem, an angled transom, a keel and transom-hung rudder controlled by a tiller and a fixed long keel. It displaces 14,000 lb (6,350 kg) and carries 4,600 lb (2,087 kg) of lead ballast.

The hull length is 28.08 ft (8.56 m), but including the bowsprit and boomkin it is 37.75 ft (11.51 m)

The boat has a draft of 4.83 ft (1.47 m) with the standard keel.

The boat is fitted with a Swedish Volvo MD 7A diesel engine of 13 hp (10 kW) or a Japanese Yanmar diesel of 27 hp (20 kW) for docking and maneuvering. The fuel tank holds 30 U.S. gallons (110 L; 25 imp gal).

The design has sleeping accommodation for four people, with two straight settee berths and a pilot berth in the main cabin and an aft quarter berth on the starboard side. The galley is located on the port side at the companionway ladder. The galley is L-shaped and is equipped with a stove and a sink. A navigation station is opposite the galley, on the starboard side. The head is located in the bow and includes an optional shower. The fresh water tank has a capacity of 64 U.S. gallons (240 L; 53 imp gal) and the holding tank has a capacity of 15 U.S. gallons (57 L; 12 imp gal). Cabin headroom is 75 in (190 cm).

The design has a hull speed of 6.9 kn (12.8 km/h).

== Operational history ==
A Blue Water Boats review noted that the design, "represents a pinnacle of ruggedness and practicality while retaining respectable performance. Few boats can take the abuse of extended voyaging as well as the Bristol Channel Cutter and I guess it's become something of a Lyle Hess masterpiece."

== See also ==
- List of sailing boat types

Related development

- Falmouth Cutter 22
- Falmouth Cutter 26
- Falmouth Cutter 34

Similar sailboats

- Aloha 28
- Beneteau First 285
- Cal 28
- Catalina 28
- Grampian 28
- J/28
- Laser 28
- O'Day 28
- Pearson 28
- Sabre 28
- Sirius 28
- Tanzer 28
- TES 28 Magnam
- Viking 28
- Westsail 32
