= Balboa 27 8.2 =

Sailboat class

Development
- Designer: Lyle C. Hess
- Location: United States
- Year: 1976
- Builder: Coastal Recreation
- Role: Cruiser

Boat
- Displacement: 4,900 lb (2,223 kg)
- Draft: 5.50 ft (1.68 m) with swing keel down

Hull
- Type: monohull
- Construction: fiberglass
- LOA: 26.50 ft (8.08 m)
- LWL: 23.00 ft (7.01 m)
- Beam: 8.00 ft (2.44 m)
- Engine: Petters Limited 9 hp (7 kW) diesel inboard motor

Hull appendages
- Keel: swing keel
- Ballast: 2,600 lb (1,179 kg)
- Rudder: transom-mounted rudder

Rig
- Rig type: Bermuda rig
- I foretriangle height: 32.00 ft (9.75 m)
- J foretriangle base: 10.60 ft (3.23 m)
- P mainsail luff: 27.30 ft (8.32 m)
- E mainsail foot: 11.00 ft (3.35 m)

Sails
- Sailplan: masthead sloop
- Mainsail area: 150.15 sq ft (13.949 m^{2})
- Jib/genoa area: 169.60 sq ft (15.756 m^{2})
- Total sail area: 319.75 sq ft (29.706 m^{2})

The Balboa 27 8.2 is a recreational keelboat first built in 1976 by Coastal Recreation in the United States, starting in 1976. It is now out of production.

== Design ==
The Balboa 27 8.2 is a development of the Balboa 26.

Designed by Lyle C. Hess the fiberglass hull has a raked stem, a plumb transom, a transom-hung rudder controlled by a tiller and a retractable swing keel. It displaces 4,900 lb (2,223 kg) and carries 2,600 lb (1,179 kg) of ballast.

The boat has a draft of 5.50 ft (1.68 m) with the swing keel extended and 2.42 ft (0.74 m) with it retracted, allowing operation in shallow water or ground transportation on a trailer.

It has a masthead sloop rig.

The boat is fitted with a 9 hp (7 kW) British Petters Limited diesel engine or a small outboard motor for docking and maneuvering. The fresh water tank has a capacity of 21 U.S. gallons (79 L; 17 imp gal) and the cabin has 73 in (190 cm) of headroom.

In a 1977 article Chuck Malseed described the boat as, "a comfortable 27' trailerable."
