= Lyle Hess =

American sailboat designer

- Born: 1912; Blackfoot, Idaho
- Died: 2002 (aged 89–90)
- Occupation: Naval architect
- Known for: sailboat designs
- Spouse: Jean "Doodle" Searing
- Father: Frank Hess

Lyle C. Hess (1912–2002) was an American naval architect, particularly known for his Aquarius and Balboa series of boats, built by Coastal Recreation.

== Early life ==
Hess was born in 1912, in Blackfoot, Idaho, one of 12 children in his family. As a child Hess carved many toy, wooden boats. His father, Frank Hess, was a general construction contractor. Frank Hess helped build the Patterson Canal in Jackson Hole, Wyoming and also did railway construction. Frank Hess then moved his family to California to pursue work.

Hess's first boat was designed and built in 1928, when he was 16 years old. It was a cruiser with a hard chine hull, named Viajera, with a length overall of 16 ft (4.9 m), a cuddy cabin and 400 lb (180 kg) of lead ballast. It carried Hess and his brother, Lee Hess, to Catalina Island, which lies 29 mi (47 km) off shore, more than 40 times in the three years he had the boat.

Viajera was kept on a mooring offshore from the Chalker and Whiting Boatyard, run by George Chalker and Bill Whiting. These two master shipwrights taught Hess much of the finer points of wooden boat construction. Hess also got to know designer Edson B. Schock, and gained an understanding of boat design. Hess never had any formal training in boat design.

In 1938, at age 23, Hess married Jean "Doodle" Searing, a partner who shared his love of sailing. They went on to have four children together.

== Second World War ==
During the Second World War, Hess became a shipwright for Harbor Boatworks of San Pedro, Los Angeles where he was part of a team building wooden motor torpedo boats and minesweepers for the Royal Navy.

== Design career ==
Following the end of the war, Hess moved his family to Eureka, California where he worked for the Humbolt Bay Boat Co., constructing wooden fishing boats. He moved back to southern California and spend a year on the construction of 168 ft (51 m) steam-driven tugboats for customers in Australia and Singapore.

In 1946 he went on to found the LA Yacht Yard along with his business partner, Roy Barteaux. The yard was located in Harbor City, California. The first two boats built at the yard were Hess's designs, Westward Ho, a 36 ft (11 m) cutter-rigged boat and Lady Elizabeth, a 40 ft (12 m) motorsailer for cinematographer Ernest Palmer.

A customer named Hale Field commissioned a 28 ft (8.5 m) "character boat" cutter for cruising, based on the lines of British working sailboats, but the post-war scarcity of wood caused Field to ask for a reduced sized mode of just under 25 ft (7.6 m). The boat was completed and launched as Renegade of Newport. The design was reminiscent of Hess's Viajera and caused Hess to consider the concept of small cruising sailboats for people of average incomes.

By the early 1950s, with high costs of materials and labor, boat contracts were harder to find and it was not easy to earn a living to support his family. Hess left the business and sold his share to his business partner Barteaux, moving to house construction instead with his brother, Ray Hess, to take advantage of the post-war boom in housing demand, while still designing yachts in his spare time.

Canadian Larry Pardey started construction of a boat based on Hess's Renegade design, as Pardey was looking for a boat to circumnavigate the globe with his wife, Lin. Pardey introduced Hess to Richard Arthur, who owned Arthur Marine in Costa Mesa, California. Arthur asked Hess to design a small, budget cruising sailboat in a new material, fiberglass and the result was the Balboa 20 design, Arthur put it into production in 1967. That was followed in 1969 by production of Hess's Balboa 26 design also at Arthur Marine. The success of the Balboa 20 allowed Hess to move to designing yachts on a full-time basis and the Ensenada 20, based upon the Balboa 20 hull with a new coach house top, soon followed.

Coastal Recreation assumed production of the designs in the mid-1970s.

Reviewer David Liscio described the Balboa 26 in a 2017 Sailing Magazine review, as "a trailerable, stoutly-constructed, economical cruising boat ideal for a couple or small family planning to gunkhole or sail the open sea."

The success of the modified Renegade design for Larry Pardee, the Seraffyn, resulted in a number of articles about the boat, as Pardee and his wife sailed it around the world and this brought Hess a degree of fame. The design was developed into the Bristol Channel Cutter "character boat" in 1976 and production by the Sam L. Morse Company which was formed in Costa Mesa, California to build the boat.

Hess quickly became an expert in the design of seaworthy trailer sailers and, as a result, was a designer in demand through the 1970s and 1980s. He considered the Falmouth Cutter 34 his best design.

In the late 1970s Hess owned a Balboa 20 of his own, named Genesis, which he and his wife regularly sailed to Catalina Island.

In one 1977 interview Hess stated, "as for me, even though there are many easier ways to earn a living, all I that ever wanted to do was design boats."

== Death ==
Hess died in July 2002, at age 90.

== Designs ==
Sailboats designed by Hess include:

- Balboa 20 (1967)
- Balboa 26 (1969)
- Kona 14 (1971)
- Ensenada 20 (1972)
- Montgomery 12 (1972)
- RK 20 (1972)
- La Paz 25 (1973)
- Montgomery 17 (1973)
- Montgomery 17 FD (1975)
- Balboa 27 8.2 (1976)
- Bristol Channel Cutter (1976)
- Nor'Sea 27 (1976)
- Aquarius 24 Pilot Cutter (1979)
- Montgomery 23 (1979)
- Montgomery 7-11
- Falmouth Cutter 22 (1980)
- Falmouth Cutter 26
- Falmouth Cutter 34 (1982)
- Nor'Sea 37 (1992)
- Fatty Knees (2000)

== See also ==
- List of sailboat designers and manufacturers
