= Bumpkin =

Bumpkin may refer to:

- Country bumpkin, a synonym for the term yokel; a foolish, poorly educated person from a rural region
- Boomkin, also known as a bumpkin, part of a sailboat

== See also ==
- Bumpkin Island, Boston Harbor, Massachusetts
- "Country Bumpkin", 1974 song by Cal Smith
