= Peter Barrett (sailor) =

American sailor

Medal record

Men's sailing

Representing the United States

Olympic Games
Gold medal – first place	1968 Mexico City	Star
Silver medal – second place	1964 Tokyo	Finn

Peter Jones Barrett (February 20, 1935 – December 17, 2000) was an American sailor and Olympic champion. He competed at the 1968 Summer Olympics in Mexico City, where he received a gold medal in the star class with the boat North Star, together with Lowell North.

He won the silver medal in the finn class at the 1964 Summer Olympics in Tokyo. He also competed in the Finn event at the 1960 Summer Olympics.

== Career ==
Barrett competed in three Olympic Games and won two medals. He finished 11th in the Finn at the Naples, Italy Games 1960, won a silver medal in the Finn at the 1964 Tokyo Games, and crewing for Lowell North won the Star class gold medal at the 1968 Games in Acapulco, Mexico. Throughout his competitive career Pete won several championships including the 470 Nationals, Finn North Americans, the C-Scow Blue Chip Regatta, and the A-Scow Inlands. He also crewed aboard the winning boat in the 1971 Chicago-Mackinac Race. In addition, Barrett served as a contributing editor to Yacht Racing/Cruising (now Sailing World), and designed several popular sailboats including the Aquarius 21 and Aquarius 23 built by Coastal Recreation, the RK 21, built by RK Industries, and the Mega 30 built by C&C Yachts.

Barrett was inducted into the National Sailing Hall of Fame in 2012.

== Family ==
Peter Barrett was the husband of Laurie Barrett (now a retired accountant) and father of three children: Kevin Barrett, Bruce Barrett, and Tara Barrett.
