= Ensenada 20 =

Sailboat class

Development
- Designer: Lyle C. Hess
- Location: United States
- Year: 1972
- Builder: Coastal Recreation, Inc
- Role: Cruiser

Boat
- Displacement: 1,600 lb (726 kg)
- Draft: 4.00 ft (1.22 m) with keel down

Hull
- Type: monohull
- Construction: fiberglass
- LOA: 20.00 ft (6.10 m)
- LWL: 17.50 ft (5.33 m)
- Beam: 7.08 ft (2.16 m)
- Engine: outboard motor

Hull appendages
- Keel: lifting keel
- Ballast: 550 lb (249 kg)
- Rudder: transom-mounted rudder

Rig
- Rig type: Bermuda rig
- I foretriangle height: 20.71 ft (6.31 m)
- J foretriangle base: 8.79 ft (2.68 m)
- P mainsail luff: 24.93 ft (7.60 m)
- E mainsail foot: 8.67 ft (2.64 m)

Sails
- Sailplan: fractional rigged sloop
- Mainsail area: 108.07 sq ft (10.040 m^{2})
- Jib/genoa area: 91.02 sq ft (8.456 m^{2})
- Total sail area: 199.09 sq ft (18.496 m^{2})

Racing
- PHRF: 288

The Ensenada 20 is an American trailerable sailboat that was designed by Lyle C. Hess as a cruiser and first built in 1972.

The Ensenada 20 is a raised deck development of the 1967 Balboa 20 by the same designer.

== Production ==
The design was built by Coastal Recreation, Inc in the United States, from 1972 until 1981, but it is now out of production.

== Design ==
The Ensenada 20 is a recreational keelboat, built predominantly of fiberglass, with wooden trim. It has a fractional sloop rig, a raked stem, an angled transom, an optional pop-top cabin, a transom-hung rudder controlled by a tiller and a lifting keel. It displaces 1,600 lb (726 kg) and carries 550 lb (249 kg) of ballast.

The boat has a draft of 4.00 ft (1.22 m) with the keel extended and 1.75 ft (0.53 m) with it retracted, allowing operation in shallow water or ground transportation on a trailer.

The boat is normally fitted with a small 3 to 6 hp (2 to 4 kW) outboard motor for docking and maneuvering.

The design has sleeping accommodation for four people, with a double "V"-berth in the bow cabin and two straight settee quarter berths in the main cabin. The galley is located on both sides, just aft of the bow cabin. The galley is equipped with an icebox and a sink. The head is located under the bow "V"-berth. Cabin headroom is 50 in (130 cm).

The design has a PHRF racing average handicap of 288 and a hull speed of 5.6 kn (10.4 km/h).

== Operational history ==
In a 2010 review Steve Henkel wrote, "best features: Optional poptop increases headroom significantly but can be a nuisance underway, as owners report that visibility is affected and the jibsheets can catch. The big foredeck is good for sunbathing. Worst features: ... the heavy swing keel can be a nuisance and even dangerous if it is not locked and pinned ... Most boats produced included kickup rudders, but some were fixed, and those could be damaged going aground. Deck winches as furnished are too small for yeoman duty. Starboard-mounted mainsheet cam cleat is an inconvenience when on starboard tack. Owner must add his own topping lift. There’s no good place to store a portable gas tank."

== See also ==
- List of sailing boat types

Related development

- Balboa 20
- RK 20
