= Coastal Recreation =

Sailboat class

Coastal Recreation, Inc
- Company type: Privately held company
- Industry: Boat building
- Founded: 1968
- Defunct: 1981
- Headquarters: Costa Mesa, California, United States
- Products: Sailboats
- Subsidiaries: RK Industries

Coastal Recreation, Inc was an American boat builder based in Costa Mesa, California. The company specialized in the design and manufacture of fiberglass sailboats designed by well-known naval architects, including Lyle C. Hess, Peter Barrett and W. Shad Turner.

The company was founded in 1968 and remained in business until 1981. The American east coast sailboat builder, RK Industries, was a subsidiary company.

== History ==
The first design produced was the Balboa 20 and this was quickly followed by a series of Balboa and Aquarius boats, all small, cruising boats with an emphasis on road transport by boat trailer.

The company formed a subsidiary sailboat builder, RK Industries, on the US east coast at Strasburg, Virginia, which built the RK 20 and RK 21.

The company was purchased by Laguna Yachts, moved to Laguna's headquarters in Stanton, California and became a subsidiary, before being shut down. Laguna Yachts itself went out of business in 1986, following the early 1980s recession.

== Boats ==
Summary of boats built by Coastal Recreation:

- Balboa 20 - 1968
- Aquarius 21 - 1969
- Aquarius 23 - 1969
- Balboa 21 - 1969
- Balboa 23 - 1969
- Balboa 26 - 1969
- Aquarius 23-2 - 1970
- Ensenada 20 - 1972
- RK 20 - 1972
- RK 21 - 1972
- La Paz 25 - 1973
- Balboa 27 8.2 - 1976
- Balboa 22 - 1977
- Balboa 16 - 1981
- Balboa 24 - 1981

== See also ==
- List of sailboat designers and manufacturers
