= Percy Dalton =

Percival George Dalton (1906–1982) was a noted artist and yacht designer. He spent much of his working life in Falmouth, Cornwall and both aspects of his work were connected to Falmouth and in particular its maritime life.

== Yacht design ==
Percy Dalton designed many small craft These were largely based on the traditional forms of working boats from Cornwall. Notable boats include:

- Hardiesse, the Falmouth sail training vessel
- Chloe May, a Pilot Cutter type yacht
- Lyonesse, a Falmouth work boat type yacht
- Moondance of Rye
- Dormouse
- Heptarchy
- St Melorus, which became the prototype for a range of production yachts
- Alf Smythers, now a working Falmouth work boat
- Doris, a Colin Archer type
- Angharad, now called Annelis, a Falmouth Pilot Cutter type

=== Construction ===
Many of Percy Dalton's boats were designed for construction in ferrocement, as well as wood and glass fiber, including Hardiesse and Moondance of Rye.

== Art ==
Percy Dalton trained at the Plymouth College of Art but rather than taking up an offer to continue his studies in Rome, he found employment at the Devonport dockyard where he was apprenticed. He continued to paint and many of his watercolours adorn the walls of houses in Falmouth, but while his work was popular locally and even ran to prints, he never gained widespread recognition.
