= Falmouth Cutter 26 =

Sailboat class

Development
- Designer: Lyle Hess
- Location: United States
- No. built: 9
- Builder: Russell Yachts
- Role: Cruiser
- Name: Falmouth Cutter 26

Boat
- Displacement: 12,000 lb (5,443 kg)
- Draft: 4.75 ft (1.45 m)

Hull
- Type: monohull
- Construction: fiberglass
- LOA: 26.00 ft (7.92 m)
- LWL: 23.75 ft (7.24 m)
- Beam: 9.58 ft (2.92 m)
- Engine: inboard motor

Hull appendages
- Keel: long keel
- Ballast: 3,708 lb (1,682 kg)
- Rudders: keel and transom-mounted rudder

Rig
- Rig type: Bermuda rig

Sails
- Sailplan: cutter rigged sloop
- Mainsail area: 214 sq ft (19.9 m^{2})
- Jib/genoa area: 173 sq ft (16.1 m^{2})
- Other sails: staysail: 113 sq ft (10.5 m^{2})
- Total sail area: 500.00 sq ft (46.452 m^{2})

The Falmouth Cutter 26 is an American sailboat that was designed by Lyle Hess as a cruiser.

== Production ==
The design was built by Russell Yachts in Morehead City, North Carolina, United States. Nine boats were completed, but it is now out of production.

== Design ==
The Falmouth Cutter 26 is a recreational keelboat, built predominantly of fiberglass, with wood trim. It is a cutter rigged sloop with a plumb stem, an angled transom, a fixed long keel and transom-hung rudder controlled by a tiller. It displaces 12,000 lb (5,443 kg) and carries 3,708 lb (1,682 kg) of lead ballast.

The boat has a draft of 4.75 ft (1.45 m) with the standard keel.

== See also ==
- List of sailing boat types

Related development

- Bristol Channel Cutter
- Falmouth Cutter 22
- Falmouth Cutter 34
- Nor'Sea 27
