= Montgomery 7-11 =

Sailboat class

- M

Development
- Designer: Lyle Hess
- Location: United States
- Builder: Montgomery Marine Products
- Role: Day sailer
- Name: Montgomery 7-11

Boat
- Displacement: 89 lb (40 kg)
- Draft: 2.00 ft (0.61 m) with leeboard down

Hull
- Type: monohull
- Construction: fiberglass
- LOA: 7.92 ft (2.41 m)
- Beam: 4.17 ft (1.27 m)

Hull appendages
- Keel: leeboards
- Rudder: transom-mounted rudder

Rig
- Rig type: cat rig

Sails
- Sailplan: catboat

The Montgomery 7-11 is an American sailing dinghy that was designed by Lyle Hess as a daysailer.

The boat has a length overall of 7 ft 11 in (2.41 m).

== Production ==
The design was built by Montgomery Marine Products in Dana Point, California, United States, but it is now out of production.

== Design ==
The Montgomery 7-11 is a recreational sailboat, built predominantly of fiberglass, with wooden trim. It has a catboat rig with aluminum spars, a spooned plumb stem, a vertical transom, a transom-hung rudder controlled by a tiller and two retractable leeboards. It displaces 89 lb (40 kg).

The boat has a draft of 2.00 ft (0.61 m) with a leeboard extended, allowing beaching or ground transportation on a trailer.

== See also ==
- List of sailing boat types
