= La Paz 25 =

Sailboat class

Development
- Designer: Lyle C. Hess
- Location: United States
- Year: 1973
- Builder: Coastal Recreation, Inc
- Role: Motorsailer
- Name: La Paz 25

Boat
- Displacement: 4,600 lb (2,087 kg)
- Draft: 2.00 ft (0.61 m)

Hull
- Type: monohull
- Construction: fiberglass
- LOA: 25.00 ft (7.62 m)
- LWL: 23.33 ft (7.11 m)
- Beam: 8.00 ft (2.44 m)
- Engine: Pisces 4-107 28 hp (21 kW) diesel engine

Hull appendages
- Keel: shoal draft fin keel
- Ballast: 1,400 lb (635 kg)
- Rudder: internally-mounted spade-type rudder

Rig
- Rig type: Bermuda rig

Sails
- Sailplan: fractional rigged sloop
- Total sail area: 245 sq ft (22.8 m^{2})

The La Paz 25 is an American trailerable sailboat that was designed by Lyle C. Hess as a motorsailer and first built in 1973.

== Production ==
The design was built by Coastal Recreation, Inc of Costa Mesa, California, United States starting in 1973, but it is now out of production.

== Design ==
The La Paz 25 is a recreational keelboat, built predominantly of fiberglass, with wood trim. It has a fractional sloop rig, a raked stem, a plumb transom, an internally mounted spade-type rudder controlled by a port-side wheel and a fixed fin, shoal-draft keel. It displaces 4,600 lb (2,087 kg) and carries 1,400 lb (635 kg) of ballast.

The boat has a draft of 2.00 ft (0.61 m) with the standard shoal-draft keel.

The boat is fitted with a Pisces diesel engine of 28 hp (21 kW) or another gasoline or diesel engine of 20 to 28 hp (15 to 21 kW). The fuel tank holds 20 U.S. gallons (76 L; 17 imp gal) and the fresh water tank has a capacity of 25 U.S. gallons (95 L; 21 imp gal).

The design has sleeping accommodation for six people, with a double "V"-berth in the bow cabin, two straight settee berths in the main cabin, with upper berths above them. The galley is located on both sides just forward of the companionway ladder. The galley is equipped with a three-burner stove and a sink. The head is located just aft of the bow cabin on the port side and includes a shower stall. Cabin headroom is 76 in (193 cm). The cockpit is open for the use of deckchairs in place of fixed seats.

For sailing downwind the design may be equipped with a symmetrical spinnaker.

The design has a hull speed of 6.5 kn (12.0 km/h).

== Operational history ==
In a 2010 review Steve Henkel wrote, "you can almost imagine the client talking to the designer, laying out his needs: “I want a fast, shallow draft, trailerable motorsailer I can easily tow with my pickup to Mexico—say La Paz—to launch off the beach and cruise for a few weeks with my wife, occasionally inviting a couple of my grown children to join us for a few days, maybe even with grandkids. I need good standing headroom below, a place for comfortable deck chairs in a spacious cockpit, and a stall shower. Oh, and ny wife is a gourmet cook who likes to bake bread, so we'll need space for a big stove with an oven. She'll spend a lot of time in the galley, so make it bright and airy down below.” That's a lot to ask, but Lyle Hess made a valiant attempt to satisfy the customer's needs. About the only thing missing is an inside steering station for sailing in inclement weather. Best features: She beats her comp[etitor]s in the space department—especially on headroom—and also on maximum speed (important under power, which motorsailors usually do a lot.) Worst features: With no centerboard and only two feet of draft, one shouldn't expect good upwind performance."

== See also ==
- List of sailing boat types
