= RK 20 =

Sailboat class

- ЯK

Development
- Designer: Lyle C. Hess
- Location: United States
- Year: 1972
- Builder: RK Industries
- Role: Cruiser

Boat
- Displacement: 1,950 lb (885 kg)
- Draft: 4.00 ft (1.22 m) with swing keel down

Hull
- Type: monohull
- Construction: fiberglass
- LOA: 20.00 ft (6.10 m)
- LWL: 17.50 ft (5.33 m)
- Beam: 7.08 ft (2.16 m)
- Engine: outboard motor

Hull appendages
- Keel: swing keel
- Ballast: 550 lb (249 kg)
- Rudder: transom-mounted rudder

Rig
- Rig type: Bermuda rig
- I foretriangle height: 23.50 ft (7.16 m)
- J foretriangle base: 8.80 ft (2.68 m)
- P mainsail luff: 21.00 ft (6.40 m)
- E mainsail foot: 8.20 ft (2.50 m)

Sails
- Sailplan: masthead sloop
- Mainsail area: 103.40 sq ft (9.606 m^{2})
- Jib/genoa area: 86.10 sq ft (7.999 m^{2})
- Total sail area: 189.50 sq ft (17.605 m^{2})

Racing
- PHRF: 264

The RK 20 is an American trailerable sailboat that was designed by Lyle C. Hess as a cruiser and first built in 1972.

The RK 20 is a development of the Hess-designed Balboa 20, as is the Ensenada 20.

== Production ==
The design was built by RK Industries, a subsidiary of Coastal Recreation, in the United States. It was built between 1972 and 1981, but it is now out of production.

== Design ==
The RK 20 is a recreational keelboat, built predominantly of fiberglass, with wood trim. It has a masthead sloop rig; a spooned, raked stem; an angled transom; a transom-hung rudder controlled by a tiller and a swing keel or fixed fin keel. The swing keel version displaces 1,950 lb (885 kg) and carries 550 lb (249 kg) of ballast, while the fin keel version displaces 2,220 lb (1,007 kg) and carries 820 lb (372 kg) of ballast.

Two cabin designs were available, a trunk cabin and a raised deck version.

The fin keel-equipped version of the boat has a draft of 3.25 ft (0.99 m), while the swing keel-equipped version has a draft of 4.00 ft (1.22 m) with the keel extended and 1.75 ft (0.53 m) with it retracted, allowing operation in shallow water, or ground transportation on a trailer.

The boat is normally fitted with a small 3 to 6 hp (2 to 4 kW) outboard motor for docking and maneuvering.

The design has sleeping accommodation for four people, with a double "V"-berth in the bow cabin and two straight settee berths in the main cabin. Cabin headroom is 45 in (114 cm). The fresh water tank has a capacity of 7 U.S. gallons (26 L; 5.8 imp gal).

The design has a PHRF racing average handicap of 264 and a hull speed of 5.6 kn (10.4 km/h).

== Operational history ==
In a 2010 review Steve Henkel noted, "the RK20 fixed-keel version would seem preferable, since it eliminates the mechanical problems some owners have experienced with the swing keel."

== See also ==
- List of sailing boat types

Related development

- Balboa 20
- Ensenada 20
