= RK 21 =

Sailboat class

- ЯK

Development
- Designer: Peter Barrett
- Location: United States
- Year: 1972
- Builder: RK Industries
- Role: Cruiser
- Name: RK 21

Boat
- Displacement: 2,000 lb (907 kg)
- Draft: 4.58 ft (1.40 m) with swing keel down

Hull
- Type: monohull
- Construction: fiberglass
- LOA: 21.00 ft (6.40 m)
- LWL: 18.25 ft (5.56 m)
- Beam: 7.92 ft (2.41 m)
- Engine: outboard motor

Hull appendages
- Keel: swing keel
- Ballast: 665 lb (302 kg)
- Rudder: transom-mounted rudder

Rig
- Rig type: Bermuda rig

Sails
- Sailplan: masthead sloop
- Total sail area: 206.00 sq ft (19.138 m^{2})

The RK 21 is an American trailerable sailboat that was designed by Peter Barrett as a cruiser and first built in 1972.

== Production ==
The design was built by RK Industries, a subsidiary of Coastal Recreation, Inc, in the United States. It was built starting in 1972, but it is now out of production.

== Design ==
The RK 21 is a recreational keelboat, built predominantly of fiberglass. It has a masthead sloop rig; a spooned, raked stem; a slightly angled transom; a transom-hung rudder controlled by a tiller and a swing keel. The design displaces 2,000 lb (907 kg) and carries 665 lb (302 kg) of ballast.

The boat has a draft of 4.58 ft (1.40 m) with the swing keel extended and 12 in (30 cm) with it retracted, allowing operation in shallow water, beaching or ground transportation on a trailer. The boat is normally fitted with a small outboard motor for docking and maneuvering.

The design has sleeping accommodation for two people, with two straight settee berths in the main cabin.

== See also ==
- List of sailing boat types
