= Aquarius 24 Pilot Cutter =

Sailboat class

Development
- Designer: Frank Parish
- Location: United States
- Year: 1979
- No. built: 33
- Builder: Top Sail Yachts
- Name: Aquarius 24 Pilot Cutter

Boat
- Displacement: 8,900 lb (4,037 kg)
- Draft: 4.00 ft (1.22 m)

Hull
- Type: monohull
- Construction: fiberglass
- LOA: 24.00 ft (7.32 m)
- LWL: 20.00 ft (6.10 m)
- Beam: 9.00 ft (2.74 m)
- Engine: Volvo MD 7 13 hp (10 kW) diesel engine or an outboard motor

Hull appendages
- Keel: long keel
- Ballast: 3,200 lb (1,451 kg)
- Rudder: keel-mounted rudder

Rig
- Rig type: Bermuda rig

Sails
- Sailplan: cutter rigged sloop
- Total sail area: 410.00 sq ft (38.090 m^{2})

Racing
- PHRF: 258

The Aquarius 24 Pilot Cutter, also called the Aquarius Pilot Cutter 24, Aquarius 24 Cutter and the Topsail Pilot Cutter, is a recreational keelboat that was designed by Frank Parish as a cruiser and first built in 1979.

== Production ==
The design was built by Top Sail Yachts in Portsmouth, Rhode Island, United States. The company built 33 of the boats from 1979 to 1984, but it is now out of production.

== Design ==
The Aquarius 24 Pilot Cutter was intended as a limited production ocean cruising boat and was inspired by 19th century working boat designs. The design goals were ease of handling, comfort and safety.

The design is built predominantly of hand-laid solid fiberglass with polyester resin, with wood trim. The deck and coach house are made from fiberglass cored 0.50 in (13 mm) marine plywood. It has a cutter rig with a Gunter topsail gaff rig optional. Spars are all aluminum. It has a spooned plumb stem, an angled transom, a keel-mounted rudder controlled by a tiller, a wooden bowsprit, a V-shaped boomkin and a fixed long keel. Although described as a trailerable boat, it displaces 8,900 lb (4,037 kg) and carries 3,200 lb (1,451 kg) of lead encapsulated ballast. The trailering weight is estimated to be 13,400 lb (6,078 kg).

Even though the hull length is 24.00 ft (7.32 m), with the bowsprit the length overall is 30.00 ft (9.14 m) or 32.00 ft (9.75 m) for the gaff-rigged model, as it has a longer bowsprit.

The boat has a draft of 4.00 ft (1.22 m) with the standard keel.

The boat is fitted with a Swedish Volvo MD 7 diesel engine of 13 hp (10 kW) for docking and maneuvering. It could also be fitted with a small 8 to 18 hp (6 to 13 kW) outboard motor and at least some were so equipped.

The design was factory delivered with a choice of at least four different interior arrangements and each boat was custom finished. Each of these layouts has sleeping accommodation for six people, with a double slant berth in the bow cabin, a U-shaped settee or aft berth on the port side in the main cabin and an aft cabin with a double berth on the starboard side. The galley is located amidships on the starboard side. The head is located just aft of the bow cabin on the starboard side. Cabin headroom is 75 in (190 cm) and the fresh water tank has a capacity of 40 U.S. gallons (150 L; 33 imp gal).

The design was sold as a "character boat", with features that were reminiscent of the late 19th century, such as ten opening bronze ports as well as bronze turnbuckles, chainplates and winches, as well as tanbark sails. For sailing the design is equipped with lazyjacks, with all lines led to the cockpit.

The design has a PHRF racing average handicap of 258 and a hull speed of 6.0 kn (11.1 km/h).

== Operational history ==
The boat is supported by an active class club, the Aquarius Pilot Cutters Owners Group.

In a 2010 review Steve Henkel wrote, "this is a compact character boat conceived in the 1970s, but designed to look like something from the 1920s or 1930s, and having the same general characteristics: heavy scantlings, lots of bronze hardware ... and tanbark sails ... Her displacement of 8,900 lbs. is more than any of her comp[etitor]s by over 10 percent and stretches the limit of practicality for a 24-foot boat, so her comp[etitor]s are probably all better performers in light air."

A review in Blue Water Boats noted that the boats are "overbuilt", "with a hull thickness varying from 3/8” at the minimum to 5/8" at the turn of the bilge and as much as 3/4" in the keel sections".
