= Falmouth Cutter 34 =

Sailboat class

Development
- Designer: Lyle Hess
- Location: Canada
- Year: 1982
- Builder: Channel Cutter Yachts
- Role: Cruiser
- Name: Falmouth Cutter 34

Boat
- Displacement: 19,000 lb (8,618 kg)
- Draft: 5.08 ft (1.55 m)

Hull
- Type: monohull
- Construction: fibreglass
- LOA: 43.00 ft (13.11 m)
- LWL: 30.83 ft (9.40 m)
- Beam: 11.58 ft (3.53 m)
- Engine: Yanmar 40 hp (30 kW) diesel engine

Hull appendages
- Keel: long keel
- Ballast: 6,600 lb (2,994 kg)
- Rudders: keel and transom-mounted rudder

Rig
- Rig type: Cutter rig
- I foretriangle height: 46.50 ft (14.17 m)
- J foretriangle base: 18.75 ft (5.72 m)
- P mainsail luff: 41.50 ft (12.65 m)
- E mainsail foot: 19.00 ft (5.79 m)

Sails
- Sailplan: Cutter rigged sloop
- Mainsail area: 394.25 sq ft (36.627 m^{2})
- Jib/genoa area: 435.94 sq ft (40.500 m^{2})
- Total sail area: 830.19 sq ft (77.127 m^{2})

The Falmouth Cutter 34 is a Canadian sailboat that was designed by American naval architect Lyle Hess as a global blue water cruiser and first built in 1982.

Hess considered it the best boat he designed.

== Production ==
The design was initially built in South Africa by Ed McNeil, but production ended after about six boats had been built. The rights were acquired in 2003 by Bryan Gittins, who had done wood work for McNeil. Gittins established Channel Cutter Yachts to build the boat in Ladysmith, British Columbia, Canada, where it remains in production. Rather than ship the large and fragile moulds from South Africa to British Columbia, Gittins had McNeil build one last hull and ship that before destroying the moulds. Gittins then built new moulds from that hull.

== Design ==
The Falmouth Cutter 34 is a recreational keelboat, built predominantly of fibreglass, with extensive wooden decks and trim. It has a cutter rig, with an optional gaff rigged mainsail. The hull has a plumb stem, an angled transom, a fixed long keel and transom-hung rudder controlled by a tiller. It displaces 19,000 lb (8,618 kg) and carries 6,600 lb (2,994 kg) of lead ballast.

The length overall, including the bowsprit and aft boomkin, is 43.00 ft (13.11 m), while the length on deck is 34.00 ft (10.36 m). The boat has a draft of 5.08 ft (1.55 m) with the standard keel.

The boat is fitted with a Japanese Yanmar diesel engine of 40 hp (30 kW) for docking and manoeuvring. The fuel tank holds 60 U.S. gallons (230 L; 50 imp gal) and the fresh water tank has a capacity of 75 U.S. gallons (280 L; 62 imp gal).

The cabin arrangements and accommodation are all custom-built and vary from boat to boat. Depending on the interior finish, the cabin has 71 to 77 in (180 to 200 cm) of headroom.

== Operational history ==
In a 2010 review by Alvah Simon in Cruising World described sailing the boat, "we tacked effortlessly through mere zephyrs and, with the help of an extended waterline due to the near-plumb stem, held impressive speeds of five knots in very light airs. The FC 34 should dash off very respectable noon-to-noon runs under normal passage conditions."

== See also ==
- List of sailing boat types

Related development

- Falmouth Cutter 22
- Falmouth Cutter 26
