= Fatty Knees =

Fibreglass sailing dinghies

Development
- Designer: Lyle Hess
- Name: Fatty Knees

Boat
- Crew: 1 (7' version); 2 (8' version); 2/3 (9' version)
- Trapeze: No

Hull
- Type: Monohull
- Construction: Fibreglass
- Hull weight: 90 lb (41 kg) (7' version); 110 lb (50 kg) (8' version); 110 lb (50 kg) (9' version)
- LOA: 7 ft (2.1 m); 8 ft (2.4 m); 9 ft (2.7 m)
- Beam: 4 ft (1.2 m) (7' version); 4 ft 3 in (1.30 m) (8' version); 4 ft 6 in (1.37 m) (9' version)

Hull appendages
- Keel: Daggerboard

Sails
- Total sail area: 40 sq ft (3.7 m^{2}) (7' version); 50 sq ft (4.6 m^{2}) (8' version); 60 sq ft (5.6 m^{2}) (9' version)

The Fatty Knees fibreglass sailing dinghies were designed by Lyle Hess (1912–2002). Produced in 7' (2.1m), 8' (2.4m) and 9' (2.7m) long models. The 8' model has a 4' (1.2m) beam. Primarily designed as a yacht tender with good rowing and towing characteristics, the boat can be sailed, with enough width in the beam to provide stability.

The hull has a lapstrake appearance. The thwarts and dagger-board trunk are fiberglass inserts glassed into the hull and are watertight. It is cat rigged with a Bermuda mainsail. A transom notch allows sculling. Equipped with oarlocks for rowing. A small outboard motor can be mounted to port. Sailing gear is designed to be stored inside the hull. About 2000 dinghies have been produced.
