= C&C Mega 30 One Design =

Sailboat class

Mega 30 One Design
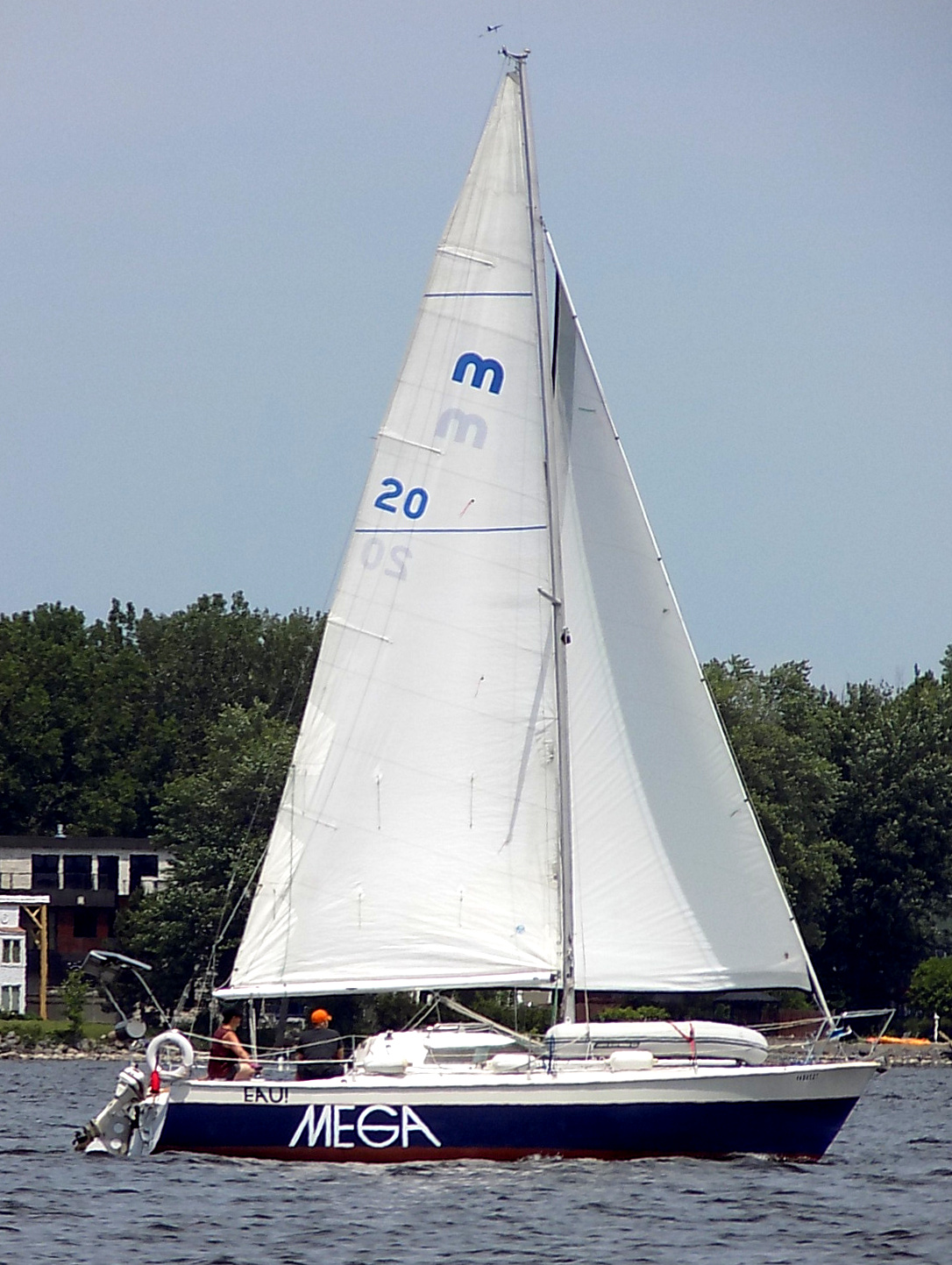

Development
- Designer: Peter Barrett
- Location: Canada
- Year: 1977
- No. built: 115 (plus 27 fixed keel)
- Builder: C&C Yachts
- Name: Mega 30 One Design

Boat
- Displacement: 4,500 lb (2,041 kg)
- Draft: 5.00 ft (1.52 m) with keel down

Hull
- Type: Monohull
- Construction: Fiberglass
- LOA: 29.92 ft (9.12 m)
- LWL: 27.33 ft (8.33 m)
- Beam: 7.92 ft (2.41 m)
- Engine: Outboard motor

Hull appendages
- Keel: lifting keel with weighted bulb
- Ballast: 2,250 lb (1,021 kg)
- Rudder: transom-mounted rudder

Rig
- General: Fractional rigged sloop
- I foretriangle height: 33.30 ft (10.15 m)
- J foretriangle base: 11.00 ft (3.35 m)
- P mainsail luff: 35.70 ft (10.88 m)
- E mainsail foot: 13.70 ft (4.18 m)

Sails
- Mainsail area: 244.55 sq ft (22.719 m^{2})
- Jib/genoa area: 183.15 sq ft (17.015 m^{2})
- Total sail area: 427.70 sq ft (39.735 m^{2})

Racing
- PHRF: 147 (average)

The C&C Mega 30 One Design is a Canadian sailboat, that was designed by American Peter Barrett as a one design racer and first built in 1977.

== Production ==
The boat was built by C&C Yachts in Canada and also in the United States and Kiel, Germany, but it is now out of production.

== Design ==
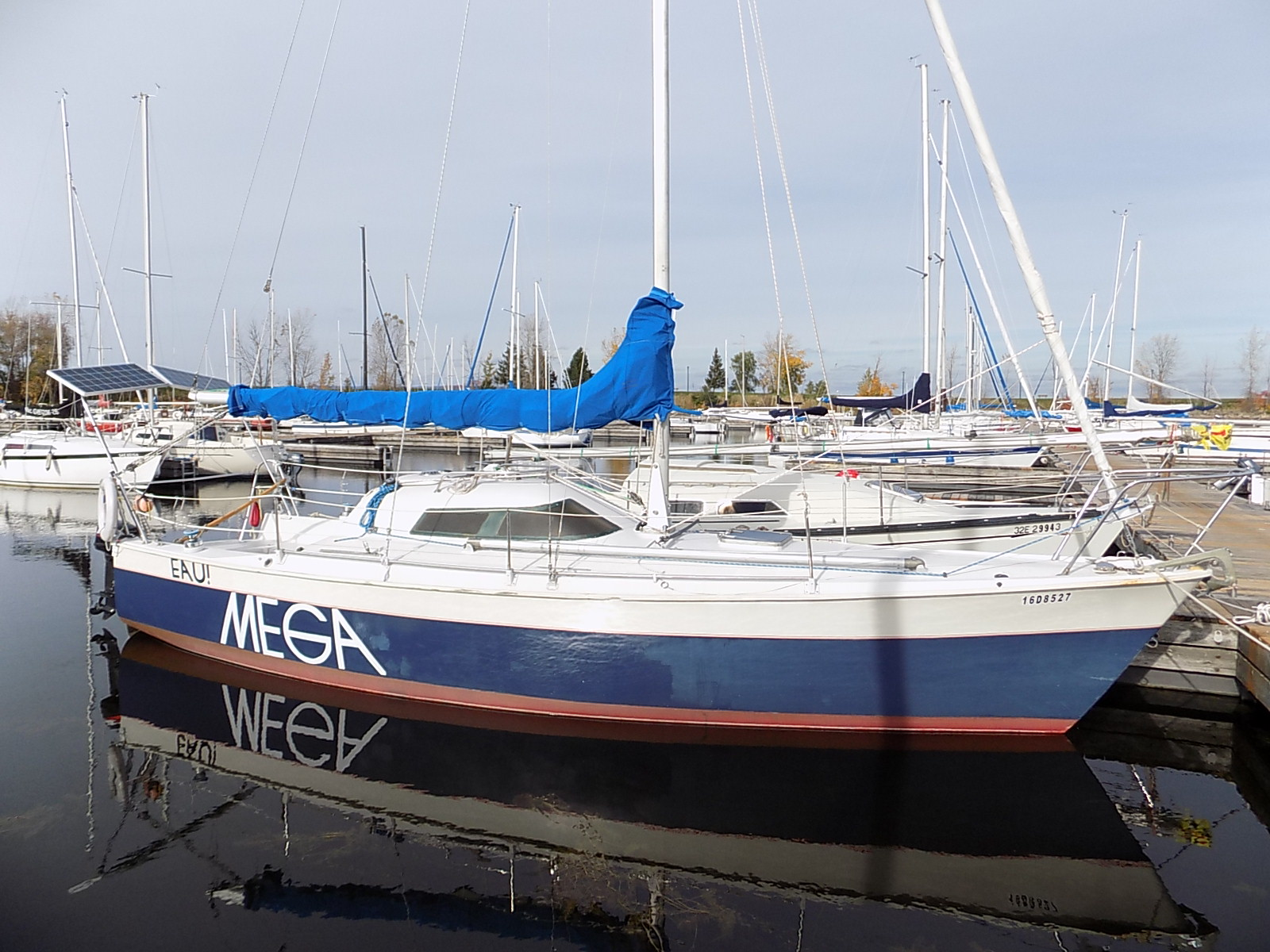
C&C Mega 30 One Design

The Mega 30 is a small recreational keelboat, built predominantly of fiberglass. It has a fractional sloop rig, a transom-hung rudder and a lifting or fixed fin keel.

The boat is normally fitted with a small outboard motor for docking and maneuvering.

The boat has a PHRF racing average handicap of 147 with a high of 171 and low of 132. It has a hull speed of 7.01 kn (12.98 km/h).

== Variants ==
Mega 30 One Design
The initial model was designated as the Mega 30 One Design and features a lifting keel with a weighted bulb. It has a draft of 5.00 ft (1.52 m) with the keel extended and 1.75 ft (0.53 m) with it retracted, allowing ground transportation on a trailer. It displaces 4,500 lb (2,041 kg) and carries 2,250 lb (1,021 kg) of ballast. A total of 115 of this model were built in Canada, the US and Germany. It was marketed in a number of countries under several names. In Sweden it was sold as the Runn Racer 912.

Mega 30 FK
The second model was designated as the Mega 30 FK and features a fixed keel with a draft of 5.20 ft (1.58 m). All 27 examples of this type were built in the US and were last of the series built. It displaces 6,589 lb (2,989 kg) and carries 2,860 lb (1,297 kg) of ballast.

== See also ==
- List of sailing boat types
