= Montgomery 23 =

1970s US recreational keelboat

- M23

Development
- Designer: Lyle Hess
- Location: United States
- Year: 1979
- No. built: 20
- Builder: Montgomery Marine Products
- Role: Cruiser

Boat
- Displacement: 3,600 lb (1,633 kg)
- Draft: 4.92 ft (1.50 m) with swing keel down

Hull
- Type: monohull
- Construction: fiberglass
- LOA: 23.00 ft (7.01 m)
- LWL: 21.83 ft (6.65 m)
- Beam: 8.00 ft (2.44 m)
- Engine: outboard motor

Hull appendages
- Keel: shoal keel with centerboard
- Ballast: 1,530 lb (694 kg)
- Rudder: transom-mounted rudder

Rig
- Rig type: Bermuda rig

Sails
- Sailplan: masthead sloop
- Total sail area: 249.00 sq ft (23.133 m^{2})

Racing
- PHRF: 234

The Montgomery 23 is a recreational keelboat built by Montgomery Marine Products in the United States starting in 1979, with 20 boats completed. Boats were sold complete and ready-to-sail or as kits, with the interior left for amateur completion.

== Design ==
The Montgomery 23 is built predominantly of fiberglass, with wood trim. The hull is molded with simulated wooden lapstrake construction, to make it look like a wooden boat. It has a masthead sloop rig, a nearly-plumb stem, a slightly angled transom, a transom-hung rudder controlled by a tiller and a fixed stub keel with a swing keel. It displaces 3,600 lb (1,633 kg) and carries 1,530 lb (694 kg) of ballast.

The boat has a draft of 4.92 ft (1.50 m) with the keel extended and 2.42 ft (0.74 m) with it retracted, allowing operation in shallow water or ground transportation on a trailer.

The boat is normally fitted with a small 3 to 6 hp (2 to 4 kW) outboard motor for docking and maneuvering.

The design has sleeping accommodation for four people, with a double "V"-berth in the bow cabin and two straight settee berths in the main cabin. The galley is located on the starboard side at the companionway ladder. The galley is L-shaped and is equipped with a two-burner stove and a sink. The head is located just aft of the bow cabin on the port side. Cabin headroom is 64 in (163 cm).

The design has a PHRF racing average handicap of 234 and a hull speed of 6.1 kn (11.3 km/h).

== Reception ==
In a 2010 review Steve Henkel wrote, "This is an unusual fiberglass boat, partly because her hull is lapstraked (that is, simulated overlapping planks are molded right into the hull), and partly because she has one of the tallest rigs (33' 6" bridge clearance) of all the 23-footers ... The M23 was available either factory-finished or sold without the usual fiberglass interior liner for finishing by owner. If you're buying one of these boats used, check the finish to see if it is up to the factory standard (which was fairly high), or was homebuilt ... Best features: The boat looks admirably 'shippy.' Worst features: Her trailering weight of 5,400 pounds means a hefty truck is needed to tow her."
