= Kona 14 =

Sailboat class

Development
- Designer: Lyle Hess
- Location: United States
- Year: 1971
- Builder: Fiberform
- Role: Racer
- Name: Kona 14

Boat
- Displacement: 150 lb (68 kg)
- Draft: 0.67 ft (0.20 m)

Hull
- Type: catamaran
- Construction: fiberglass
- LOA: 14.08 ft (4.29 m)
- Beam: 6.58 ft (2.01 m)

Hull appendages
- Keel: no keel or daggerboards
- Rudder: transom-mounted rudder

Rig
- Rig type: Bermuda rig

Sails
- Sailplan: fractional rigged sloop
- Total sail area: 120.00 sq ft (11.148 m^{2})

The Kona 14 is an American catamaran sailing dinghy that was designed by Lyle Hess as a racer and first built in 1971.

== Production ==
The design was built by Fiberform in the United States, starting in 1971, but it is now out of production.

== Design ==
The Kona 14 is a recreational catamaran, built predominantly of fiberglass. It has a fractional sloop rig. The two hulls each have raked stems, a plumb transoms and transom-hung rudders controlled by a tiller. The hulls have no keel or daggerboards, instead they are curved to provide a keel-effect and to reduce leeway when sailing to windward.

The boat has a draft of 0.67 ft (0.20 m) allowing operation in shallow water, beaching or ground transportation on a trailer.

A trapeze may be fitted.

== See also ==
- List of sailing boat types

Similar sailboats

- Hobie 14
