= Falmouth Quay Punt =

The Falmouth Quay Punt was a type of working sailing vessel in the port of Falmouth, Cornwall in the 19th and early 20th century. They would be hired by merchant ships anchored in Carrick Roads – to carry stores, mail and passengers. Falmouth, with a good deep water harbour situated near the Western entrance to the English Channel, was a popular port for merchant sailing ships to call "for orders". Before the days of radio, captains would often not know which port their cargo would be destined for before they arrived in the country, and needed to collect instructions before continuing.

The Falmouth Quay Punt got its name from operating from Falmouth's Custom House Quay, where shipping agent's had their offices. The term "punt" was commonly used around the British coast for a smaller version of the local working craft, often an open boat, propelled by oar and/or sail. (Note: This meaning of the word "punt" is additional to that found in the Oxford English Dictionary, which only describes the pleasure craft propelled with a pole. There were a number of working craft that had the name "punt" in their proper name. Also, a smack or other small sailing vessel would commonly describe the boat they carried for communication with the shore as "the punt" - it would be used in the same way as a yachtsman's dinghy.)

== Functions ==
Ships coming to anchor in the Carrick Roads would employ a Falmouth Quay Punt to be a runabout while they were in port. Traditionally, the first punt to come in contact with a ship as it came into the channel would get the job of looking after her while she was in port, so the punts would often range far to the west in the hope of finding a ship and getting custom.

Typical jobs while in port would include running fresh provisions or mail out to the ship, and taking passengers ashore.

== Characteristics ==
The early Falmouth Quay Punts were clinker built open boats, about 18 ft. in length, rigged with a standing lug on the mainmast and a jib-headed mizzen. With large numbers of ships coming in to Carrick Roads, there was not much need to seek business outside the confines of the harbour.

With the coming of steam, (Note: c. 1840—1860) the newer punts were of a very different design. They were gaff-rigged yawls, carvel built and deep-keeled, with substantial deadrise. They had short, stumpy mainmasts and did not set a top-sail – this was so that their rig did not foul the yards and braces of square-rigged vessels as they came alongside. They were half-decked, with an open well aft. Length increased to between 20 and 30 ft as the type continued to evolve through the 1870s. These were the craft that would prospect for new arrivals outside the harbour, and so needed better sea-keeping abilities than the earlier types. The handy arrangement of the rig allowed the Quay Punt to be operated single-handed with ease.

== End of an era ==
The arrival of the radio, and engines, together spelt the end of an era for these seaworthy craft shortly after the end of the First World War. Many were turned into yachts, and a few survive to this day. Chas Peters, the wife of Maurice Griffiths, the well-known yachting author, owned the working boat Juanita for a number of years, and she features in one of Maurice Griffiths' books.

== Survivors ==
Curlew is perhaps the best-known Quay Punt surviving today. Tim and Pauline Carr circumnavigated the world in the 28-foot engineless boat, from the Arctic to the Antarctic Peninsula and explored with her around the remote Antarctic island of South Georgia, before donating her to the National Maritime Museum Cornwall. The even smaller Quay Punt Teal - originally built as Little Pal for the writer Percy Woodcock, and also operated without an engine, recently undertook a long voyage to the Baltic Sea.

== See also ==
- Falmouth work boat
