= Montgomery 12 =

Sailboat class

- M12

Development
- Designer: Lyle Hess
- Location: United States
- Year: 1972
- Builder: Montgomery Marine Products
- Role: Day sailer

Boat
- Displacement: 145 lb (66 kg)
- Draft: 3.00 ft (0.91 m) with centerboard down

Hull
- Type: monohull
- Construction: fiberglass
- LOA: 12.20 ft (3.72 m)
- LWL: 10.00 ft (3.05 m)
- Beam: 4.83 ft (1.47 m)

Hull appendages
- Keel: centerboard
- Rudder: transom-mounted rudder

Rig
- Rig type: Bermuda rig

Sails
- Sailplan: fractional rigged sloop
- Total sail area: 91.00 sq ft (8.454 m^{2})

The Montgomery 12 is an American sailing dinghy that was designed by Lyle Hess as a daysailer and first built in 1972.

== Production ==
The design was the first boat built by Montgomery Marine Products in Dana Point, California, United States, but it is now out of production.

== Design ==
The Montgomery 12 is a recreational sailboat, built predominantly of fiberglass, with wooden trim. It has a fractional sloop rig with aluminum spars, a spooned plumb stem, a vertical transom, a transom-hung rudder controlled by a tiller and a retractable centerboard. It displaces 145 lb (66 kg).

The boat has a draft of 3.00 ft (0.91 m) with the centerboard extended and 10 in (25 cm) with it retracted, allowing beaching or ground transportation on a trailer.

The design has a hull speed of 4.24 kn (7.85 km/h).

== See also ==
- List of sailing boat types
