= Montgomery 15 =

1980s US recreational keelboat

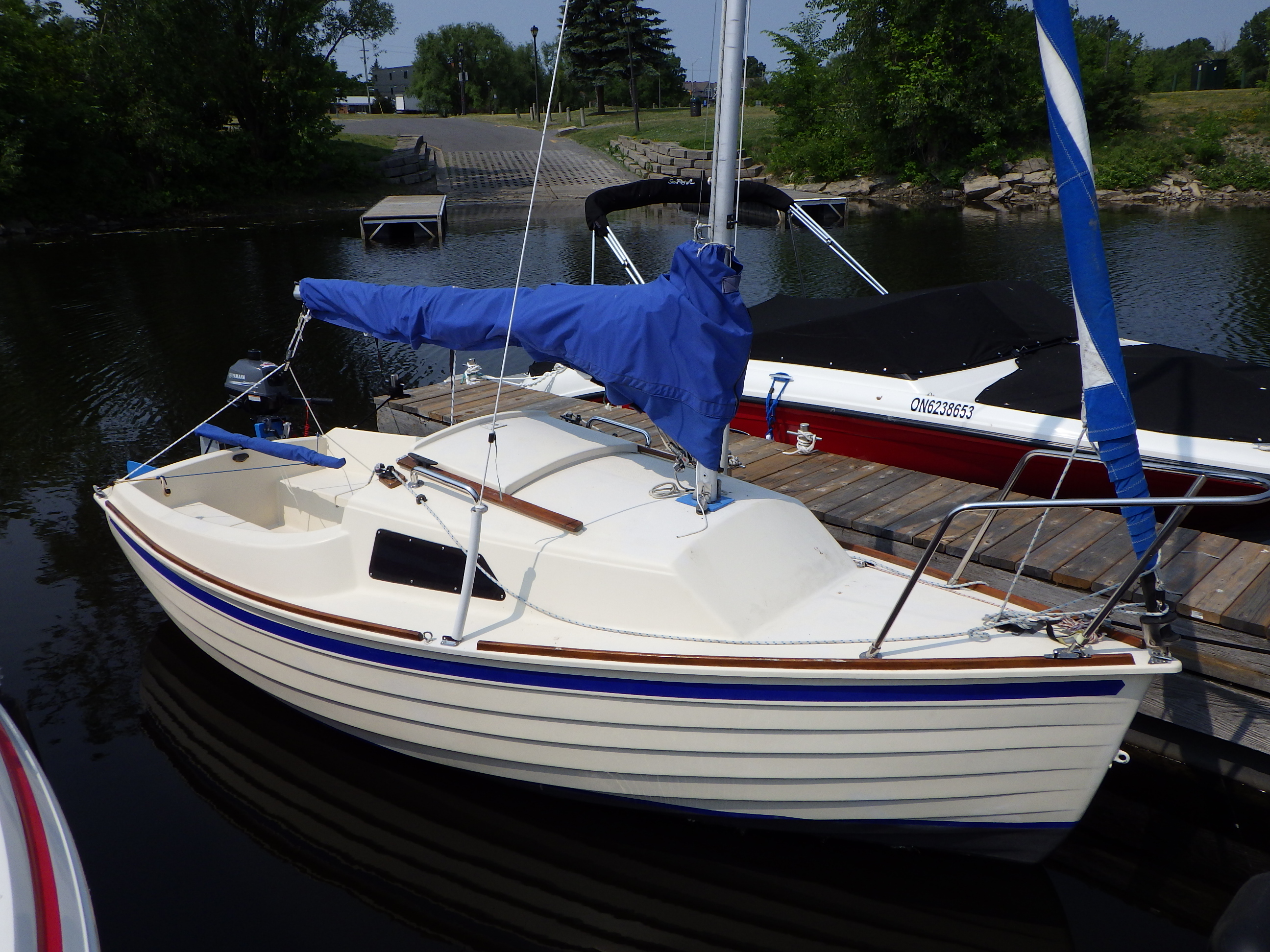
- M15

Development
- Designer: Jerry Montgomery
- Location: United States
- Year: 1980
- No. built: 500
- Builders: Montgomery Marine Products; Nor'Sea Yachts; Montgomery Boats
- Role: Cruiser
- Name: Montgomery 15

Boat
- Displacement: 750 lb (340 kg)
- Draft: 2.04 ft (0.62 m) with centerboard down

Hull
- Type: monohull
- Construction: fiberglass
- LOA: 15.00 ft (4.57 m)
- LWL: 13.25 ft (4.04 m)
- Beam: 6.16 ft (1.88 m)
- Engine: outboard motor

Hull appendages
- Keel: shoal keel and centerboard
- Ballast: 275 lb (125 kg)
- Rudder: transom-mounted rudder

Rig
- Rig type: Bermuda rig

Sails
- Sailplan: fractional rigged sloop
- Total sail area: 122 sq ft (11.3 m^{2})

The Montgomery 15 is a recreational keelboat first built in 1980 by Montgomery Marine Products, Nor'Sea Yachts and Montgomery Boats in the United States, with 500 boats completed, but it is now out of production.

== Design ==
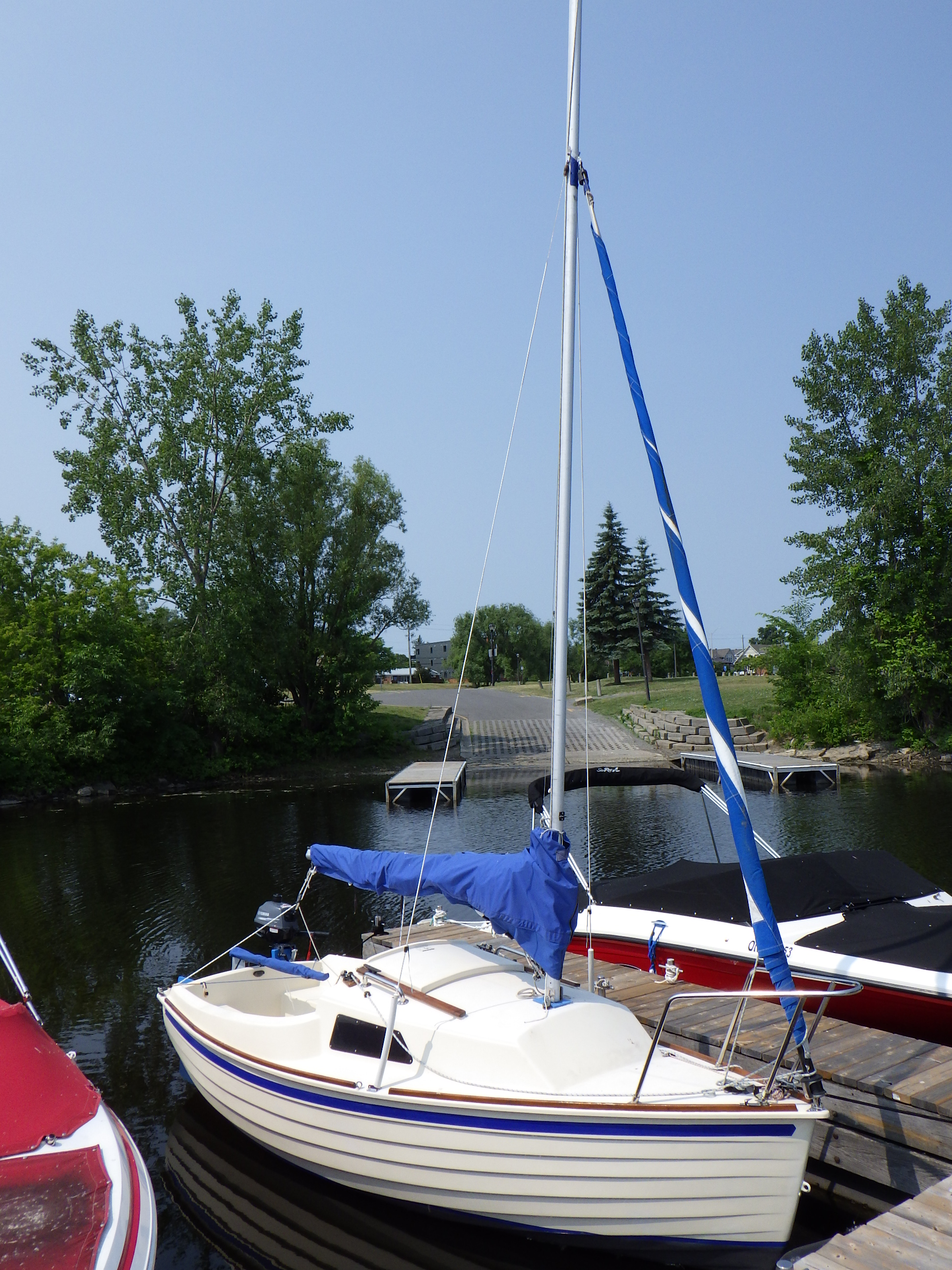
Montgomery 15

The Montgomery 15 is built predominantly of fiberglass, with simulated lapstrake construction molded in. It has a fractional sloop rig, a nearly plumb stem, a vertical transom, a transom-hung rudder controlled by a tiller and a fixed stub keel with a retractable centerboard. It displaces 750 lb (340 kg) and carries 275 lb (125 kg) of ballast.

The boat has a draft of 2.04 ft (0.62 m) with the centerboard extended and 1.25 ft (0.38 m) with it retracted, allowing operation in shallow water or ground transportation on a trailer.

The boat is normally fitted with a small 2 to 5 hp (1 to 4 kW) outboard motor for docking and maneuvering.

The design has sleeping accommodation for two people. Cabin headroom is 48 in (122 cm).

The design has a hull speed of 4.9 kn (9.1 km/h).

== Reception ==
In a 2010 review Steve Henkel wrote, "several hundred of these little boats were built and sold by Montgomery Marine over a period of 14 years, and in 1999 production recommenced, under the wing of Nor’Sea Yachts. Now the boats are being built under yet another name, Montgomery Boats. Best features: With her springy sheer and simulated lapstrake hull, she looks very graceful despite the relatively high freeboard ... Attention to detail in her construction is above average. Her ballast and displacement are high enough to give her good stability for a 15-footer. Worst features: She has the shallowest maximum draft (2' 6" with board down), making for somewhat poorer upwind performance compared to other comp[etitor]s, which all have drafts in the 3' to 4' range."
