= Balboa 26 =

Sailboat class

Development
- Designer: Lyle C. Hess
- Location: United States
- Year: 1969
- Builders: Arthur Marine; Coastal Recreation
- Role: Cruiser

Boat
- Displacement: 3,600 lb (1,633 kg)
- Draft: 5.00 ft (1.52 m) with swing keel down

Hull
- Type: monohull
- Construction: fiberglass
- LOA: 25.58 ft (7.80 m)
- LWL: 20.83 ft (6.35 m)
- Beam: 7.96 ft (2.43 m)
- Engine: outboard motor

Hull appendages
- Keel: swing keel
- Ballast: 1,200 lb (544 kg)
- Rudder: internally-mounted spade-type

Rig
- Rig type: Bermuda rig
- I foretriangle height: 30.00 ft (9.14 m)
- J foretriangle base: 10.80 ft (3.29 m)
- P mainsail luff: 24.80 ft (7.56 m)
- E mainsail foot: 10.80 ft (3.29 m)

Sails
- Sailplan: masthead sloop
- Mainsail area: 133.92 sq ft (12.442 m^{2})
- Jib/genoa area: 162.00 sq ft (15.050 m^{2})
- Total sail area: 295.92 sq ft (27.492 m^{2})

The Balboa 26 is a recreational keelboat initially built by Arthur Marine starting in 1969. It was then built by Coastal Recreation in the United States, between about 1972 and 1976. It is now out of production.

== Design ==
Designed by Lyle C. Hess the fiberglass hull is all solid laminate fiberglass, with the deck plywood cored. a raked stem, a slightly angled transom, an internally mounted spade-type rudder controlled by a tiller and a lifting keel or optional fixed fin keel. The keel is actuated by a 12:1 mechanical advantage winch. The rudder can be removed from the transom from the cockpit. The boat displaces 3,600 lb (1,633 kg) and carries 1,200 lb (544 kg) of ballast.

The boat has a masthead sloop rig.

The fixed keel-equipped version of the boat has a draft of 5.0 ft (1.5 m), while the lifting keel-equipped version has a draft of 5.00 ft (1.52 m) with oh the keel extended and 1.83 ft (0.56 m) with it retracted, allowing operation in shallow water or ground transportation on a trailer.

The boat is normally fitted with a small outboard motor for docking and maneuvering.

The design has sleeping accommodation for five people, with a double "V"-berth in the bow cabin, a straight settee in the main cabin on the starboard side and drop-down dinette table that converts to a double berth on the port side. The galley is located on both sides of the companionway ladder. The galley is equipped with a two-burner stove to starboard and an ice box and sink to port. The head is located just aft of the bow cabin on the port side. The standard cabin deck was shag carpet, with teak optional. Cabin headroom is 65 in (170 cm).

For sailing downwind the design may be equipped with a symmetrical spinnaker.

In a 2008 review in Cruising World Matt Djos wrote, "Under sail, the Balboa 26 is quite stiff. The boat is fast and maneuverable, but it's a handful for a novice sailor. The 26 has noticeable weather helm, and the tiller requires constant attention. As with most boats of this type, the swing keel has a tendency to rumble at hull speed, which is a little more than 6 knots."

David Liscio, writing for Sailing Magazine in 2017, noted, "the Balboa 26 is a trailerable, stoutly-constructed, economical cruising boat ideal for a couple or small family planning to gunkhole or sail the open sea."
