= Aquarius 21 =

Keelboat first built in 1969

- A 21

Development
- Designer: Peter Barrett
- Location: United States
- Year: 1969
- Builder: Coastal Recreation, Inc
- Role: Cruiser
- Name: Aquarius 21

Boat
- Displacement: 1,900 lb (862 kg)
- Draft: 4.50 ft (1.37 m), with centerboard down

Hull
- Type: monohull
- Construction: fiberglass
- LOA: 21.00 ft (6.40 m)
- LWL: 18.25 ft (5.56 m)
- Beam: 7.82 ft (2.38 m)
- Engine: outboard motor

Hull appendages
- Keel: centerboard
- Ballast: 665 lb (302 kg)
- Rudder: transom-mounted rudder

Rig
- Rig type: Bermuda rig
- I foretriangle height: 18.20 ft (5.55 m)
- J foretriangle base: 7.20 ft (2.19 m)
- P mainsail luff: 19.50 ft (5.94 m)
- E mainsail foot: 10.00 ft (3.05 m)

Sails
- Sailplan: fractional rigged sloop
- Mainsail area: 97.50 sq ft (9.058 m^{2})
- Jib/genoa area: 65.52 sq ft (6.087 m^{2})
- Total sail area: 163.02 sq ft (15.145 m^{2})

Racing
- PHRF: 273

The Aquarius 21 is a recreational keelboat first built in 1969 by Coastal Recreation, Inc in the United States, and now out of production.

The design was also sold in slightly modified form as the Aquarius Pelican from about 1978 and, later, the Balboa 21.

== Design ==
Designed by Peter Barrett, the fiberglass hull has a spooned raked stem, an angled transom, a "pop-top" cabin, a transom-hung rudder controlled by a tiller and a retractable centerboard.

The boat is normally fitted with a small 3 to 6 hp (2 to 4 kW) outboard motor for docking and maneuvering.

The design has sleeping accommodation for two people, with a double "V"-berth in the bow cabin and two quarter berths in the main cabin, under the cockpit. The galley is located on the port side just forward of the companionway ladder. The galley is equipped with a stove and a sink. The head is located under the bow cabin "V" berth, on the port side. Cabin headroom is 54 in (140 cm), or 69 in (180 cm) with the "pop-top" open.

The design has a PHRF racing average handicap of 273 and a hull speed of 5.7 kn (10.6 km/h).

It has a fractional sloop rig.

== Variants ==
Aquarius 21
This model was introduced in 1969 and built until 1977. It has a length overall of 21.00 ft (6.4 m), a waterline length of 18.25 ft (5.6 m), displaces 1,900 lb (862 kg) and carries 665 lb (302 kg) of ballast, with the centerboard weighing 165 lb (75 kg) of that. The boat has a draft of 4.50 ft (1.37 m) with the centerboard down and 1.00 ft (0.30 m) with the centerboard up.
Aquarius Pelican
This model was introduced in 1978 and incorporated minor changes.
Balboa 21
This later model has a length overall of 21.00 ft (6.4 m), a waterline length of 18.25 ft (5.6 m), displaces 2,000 lb (907 kg) and carries 665 lb (302 kg) of ballast. The boat has a draft of 4.58 ft (1.40 m) with the centerboard down and 1.00 ft (0.30 m) with the centerboard up.
