= Sage 17 =

2010s US recreational keelboat

Development
- Designer: Jerry Montgomery
- Location: United States
- Year: 2011
- Builder: Sage Marine
- Role: Day sailer-cruiser
- Name: Sage 17

Boat
- Displacement: 1,300 lb (590 kg)
- Draft: 3.50 ft (1.07 m) with centerboard down

Hull
- Type: monohull
- Construction: fiberglass and carbon fiber
- LOA: 16.83 ft (5.13 m)
- LWL: 15.58 ft (4.75 m)
- Beam: 6.75 ft (2.06 m)
- Engine: outboard motor

Hull appendages
- Keel: shoal keel and centerboard
- Ballast: 520 lb (236 kg)
- Rudder: transom-mounted rudder

Rig
- Rig type: Bermuda rig

Sails
- Sailplan: fractional rigged sloop
- Mainsail area: 98 sq ft (9.1 m^{2})
- Jib/genoa area: 54–87 sq ft (5.0–8.1 m^{2})

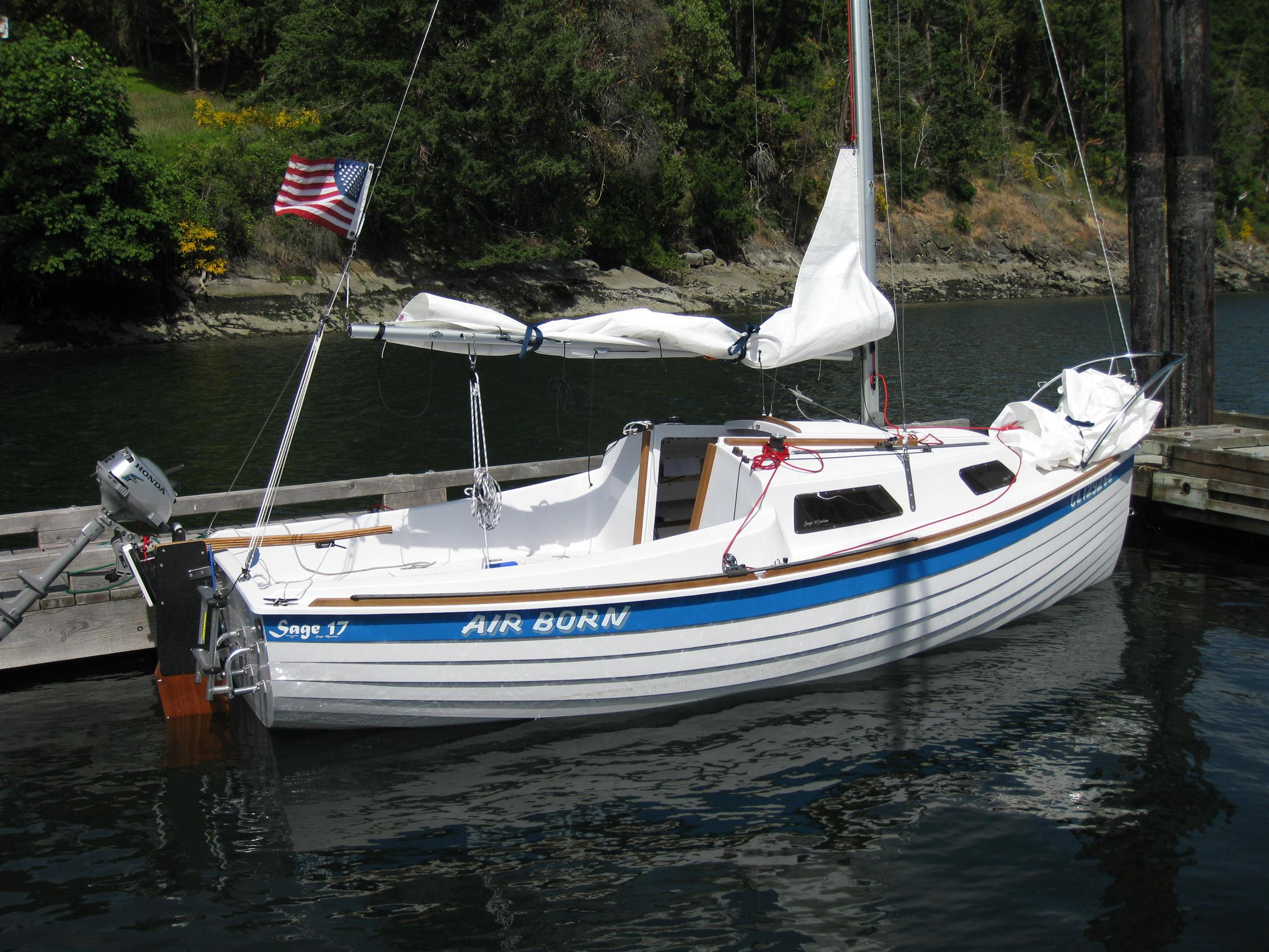

Sage 17 is a recreational keelboat built by Sage Marine in Golden, Colorado, United States beginning in 2011, and production ceased after being suspended in 2020 due to the COVID-19 pandemic.

== Design ==
Sage 17 is built predominantly of carbon fiber, fiberglass with vinylester resin, with teak wood trim. The deck, coach house and transom have a balsa core.

The sailplan is a 7/8 fractional sloop with a single set of spreaders. The hull has a plumb stem, vertical transom, transom-hung kick-up rudder controlled by a tiller and an underbody with a shoal keel containing a centerboard.

Displacement is 1,300 lb (590 kg) and carries 120 lb (54 kg) of ballast in the centerboard, with an additional 400 lb (181 kg) of ballast in the keel.

Sage 17 has a draft of 3.50 ft (1.07 m) with the centerboard extended and 1.75 ft (0.53 m) retracted, allowing beaching and simplifying transportation on a trailer.

The boat is normally fitted with a two horsepower outboard motor for docking and maneuvering.

The cabin has sleeping accommodation for two people with a double "V"-berth in the cabin. Interior seating is port and starboard just aft of the "V"-berth at the companionway. A head is located under the aft end of the "V"-berth.

The 98 sq ft (9.1 m^{2}) main was offered with one or two reef points. Multiple headsails were available:

- 54 sq ft (5.0 m^{2}) working jib
- 65 sq ft (6.0 m^{2}) 'lapper'
- 87 sq ft (8.1 m^{2}) genoa
- 16 sq ft (1.5 m^{2}) storm jib.

Roller reefing/furling headsail hardware was an option.

== Reception ==
Sail magazine named the design one of its Best Boats of 2013, describing it as, "a pretty, seamanlike little thing that’s sure to draw admiring looks way out of proportion to its size."

In Sail magazine's 2013 review Kimball Livingston wrote, "It's easy to like this boat. Anyone looking for a pocket cruiser more or less like this little one should ask for a dance."
