= Aquarius 23 =

22-foot American keelboat

- A 23

Development
- Designer: Peter Barrett & Stan Miller
- Location: United States
- Year: 1969
- Builder: Coastal Recreation, Inc
- Role: Cruiser
- Name: Aquarius 23

Boat
- Displacement: 2,280 lb (1,034 kg)
- Draft: 4.58 ft (1.40 m) with swing keel down

Hull
- Type: monohull
- Construction: fiberglass
- LOA: 22.67 ft (6.91 m)
- LWL: 21.17 ft (6.45 m)
- Beam: 7.92 ft (2.41 m)
- Engine: outboard motor

Hull appendages
- Keel: swing keel
- Ballast: 815 lb (370 kg)
- Rudder: internally-mounted spade-type rudder

Rig
- Rig type: Bermuda rig
- I foretriangle height: 22.00 ft (6.71 m)
- J foretriangle base: 8.70 ft (2.65 m)
- P mainsail luff: 23.70 ft (7.22 m)
- E mainsail foot: 10.30 ft (3.14 m)

Sails
- Sailplan: fractional rigged sloop
- Mainsail area: 122.06 sq ft (11.340 m^{2})
- Jib/genoa area: 95.70 sq ft (8.891 m^{2})
- Total sail area: 217.76 sq ft (20.231 m^{2})

Racing
- PHRF: 282

The Aquarius 23 is a recreational keelboat built from 1969 to 1981 by Coastal Recreation, Inc in the United States.

== Design ==
Designed by Peter Barrett and Stan Miller, it was developed into several derivative models, the Aquarius 23-2, the Aquarius 7.0 and the Balboa 23.

It has a fiberglass hull and balsa-cored decks. The hulls all have a slightly raked stems, slightly angled transoms, rudders controlled by a tiller and cabin "pop-tops".

The boat is normally fitted with a small 3 to 6 hp (2 to 4 kW) outboard motor for docking and maneuvering.

The design has sleeping accommodation for five people, with a double "V"-berth in the bow cabin and two straight settees in the main cabin. The starboard settee is almost 14 ft (4.3 m) long and can accommodate two people. There is a drop leaf table located at the long berth. The galley is located on the port side just forward of the companionway ladder. The head is located just aft of the bow cabin on the port side. Cabin headroom is 59 in (150 cm) or 71 in (180 cm) with the pop-top up.

The design has a PHRF racing average handicap of 282 and a hull speed of 6.2 kn (11.5 km/h).

In a 2010 review Steve Henkel faulted the boat's aesthetics, writing, "because the freeboard is very high, partly to provide more than usual headroom for a 23-foot boat, she looks high and boxy."

== Variants ==
Aquarius 23
This base model was introduced in 1969 and produced until 1976. It has a swing keel, a fractional sloop, tall rig or optional masthead sloop rig. It has a length overall of 22.67 ft (6.9 m), a waterline length of 21.17 ft (6.5 m), displaces 2,280 lb (1,034 kg) and carries 815 lb (370 kg) of lead ballast, including 165 lb (75 kg) in the keel. The rudder is a retractable spade-type. The boat has a draft of 4.58 ft (1.40 m) with the keel down and 1.08 ft (0.33 m) with the keel up.
Balboa 23
This model was introduced in 1969. It has a swing keel and a fractional rig. It has a length overall of 22.67 ft (6.9 m), a waterline length of 21.17 ft (6.5 m), displaces 2,500 lb (1,134 kg) and carries 815 lb (370 kg) of lead ballast. The boat has a draft of 4.58 ft (1.40 m) with the keel down and 1.08 ft (0.33 m) with the keel up.
Aquarius 23-2
This model was introduced in 1970, was produced until 1977. It has fixed fin keel, fractional rig, or optional masthead sloop rig. It has a length overall of 22.67 ft (6.9 m), a waterline length of 21.17 ft (6.5 m), displaces 2,580 lb (1,170 kg). The rudder is a spade-type. The boat has a draft of 3.70 ft (1.13 m) with the standard fin keel.
Aquarius 7.0
This model was introduced in 1976 and production had ended by the time the company went out of business in 1981. This version brought a number of modifications, including a transom-mounted rudder.
