= Seven Seas Cruising Association =

The Seven Seas Cruising Association, or SSCA, is an international organization for cruisers based in the United States. It was founded in 1952. The SSCA Corporate Bylaws state the purpose of the organization is "to provide an association of persons having a common interest in living aboard and cruising seagoing craft and to exchange experiences and information in connection with their common interest for the mutual comfort, safety and pleasure of all".

It has an online website at www.ssca.org, with many programs such as CONNECT, ADVOCACY, and more; publishes a monthly bulletin and promotes environmentally conscious yachting amongst their approximately 2,000 member boats. Social and educational program focuses on events such as conventions or "GAMS", that are gatherings of the membership in cruising grounds around the world, plus an annual meeting being held in Florida in November. SSCA hosts multiple webinars focused on cruisers and with attendees from around the word where our cruiser are. The organization is active in providing the cruising community's point of view with respect to laws (such as anchoring ordinances) that affect boaters.

A major benefit to the members are "Cruising Station Hosts." These are individuals at various cruising destinations around the world. They act as local ambassadors for visiting cruisers providing ""local knowledge:" where to shop, procure repair parts, fuel, water etc.

The organization also operates a video/webinar program with live and recorded presentations as part of the "Seven Seas University." www.ssca.org/ssu as well as YouTube programs on the Seven Seas Cruising Association YouTube Channel. The Cruiser Summit is one such feature. This provides instruction on topics of interest to cruising sailors.

The SSCA is incorporated as a tax-exempt non-profit organization under IRS Section 501(c)(7) - "Recreational and Social Clubs". It has an associated foundation, the SSCA Foundation, Inc. that is a 501(c)(3) corporation primarily for educational purposes.

== Bulletin ==
The monthly Cruisers' Bulletin published by the SSCA focuses on sharing information among cruisers on topics ranging from navigation to customs procedures in various countries. Members submit letters and local information to the Bulletin about where they are cruising.

=== Social media ===
The club also maintains an open Facebook page with over 13,000 members to share experiences and ideas.

== Website ==
The SSCA www.ssca.org site has a large knowledge base with:

- Areas to CONNECT with other users and happenings/events
- Advocacy Boater Rights and Destination Information
- Member Directory, Forums, and Publications
- Hot spot links dynamic maps to info by country/area,
- Member tracking and maps - find other members and cruising families,
- Over 120 worldwide cruising stations or Cruising Station Hosts,
- Guides for destinations and ports
- Mobile App for Android and IOS with website, meets and chats functions

Other services include a self-updating membership roster including boat name, crew names and hailing port. Online programs for current events, and features such as Advocacy, Clean Wake, Cruising Hosts, webinars and live online events, and more. Members have sponsor/partner discounts featuring marine products and services.

Members can keep in touch, learn new skills, renew and update their email addresses, and access all SSCA programs. Other web features include online content in both PDF and searchable content.

== History ==
The SSCA was founded in 1952 in Coronado, California, United States, and was based the idea that cruising sailors enjoy hearing from and about each other and that their experiences and discoveries can benefit all. The focus of the SSCA was for members to share cruising information by sending letters about their experiences to the Commodores’ Bulletin(now the 'Cruisers Bulletin), and to recommend others for membership.

Towards the end of 1975, after moving permanently to south Florida, SSCA was incorporated as a Florida ‘Not for Profit’ Corporation under the IRS Section 501(c)(7) - "Recreational and Social Clubs". Although the SSCA still depends on volunteers for all of its events and activities, there a staff to support members as well, our Homebase. The SSCA Foundation has been formed, a 501(c)(3) as a non-profit to support SSCA humanitarian efforts, www.ssca.org/foundation

On an annual basis, members hold meetings/conventions/GAMS in Trinidad, Florida's West Coast, Maine and Annapolis, an Annual Convention and Meeting in Florida, plus online events several times a month. SSCA has monthly meetings for lunches for local members.
