= Boomkin =

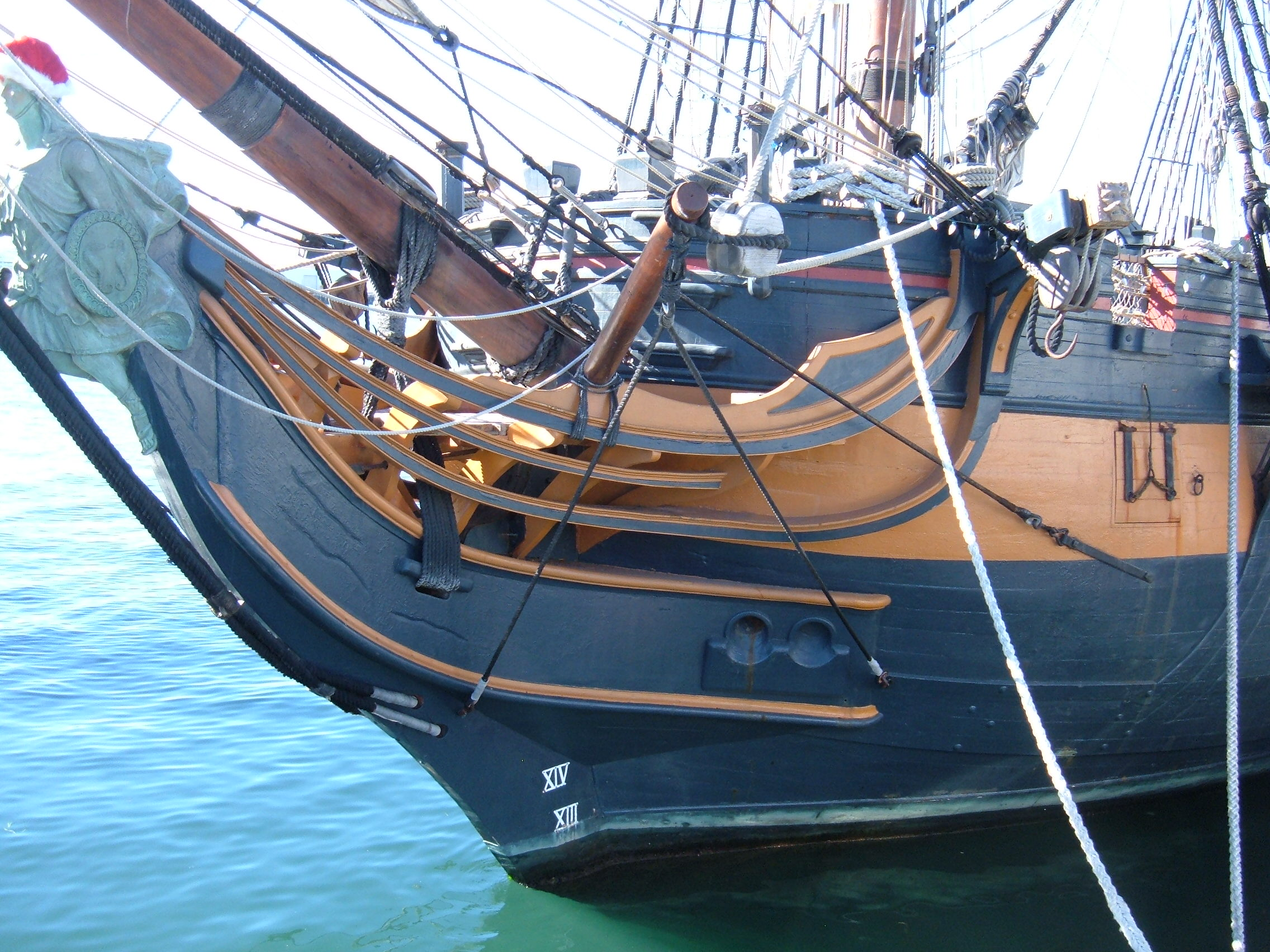
A boomkin projecting from the bow of HMS Surprise (in center of image)

A boomkin, bumkin, or bumpkin is a short spar that may project either fore or aft on a sailing vessel, depending on its function. Traditionally, it was a strong, usually wooden spar extending forward over the bow of a Western sailing ship holding a block through which the tack of the foresail was passed; on some modern sailing yachts with long main booms it is a short spar extending aft from the stern anchoring a central backstay.

Historically, boomkins were employed in pairs, one on either side of the vessel, often canted downwards over the main head-rail. Originally butted at their inboard ends against a knighthead, bolting prevailed since the end of the 18th century.

They are not to be confused with catheads, heavy wooden beams on either side of a traditional vessel's bow angled forward at roughly 45 degrees which support the ship's anchors when being raised or lowered.

== History ==
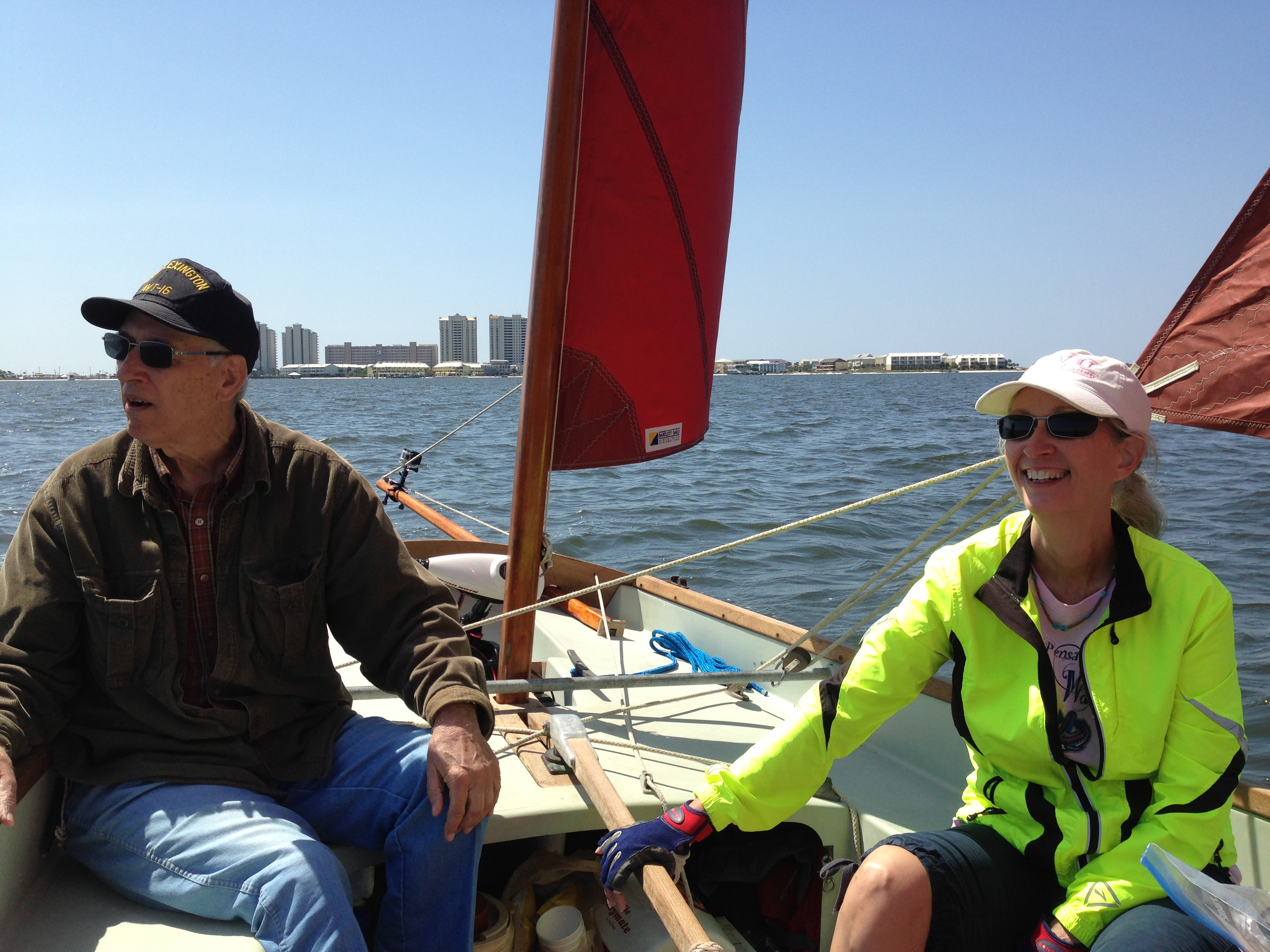
Photo of the mizzen sail boomkin on 1980 Drascombe Lugger Onkahye sliding gunter rig yawl

Traditional boomkins found on English sailing vessels gradually evolved from 1710 until around 1850.

- 1710–1730 CE: The first boomkins were generally 6 feet (1.8 m) to 8 feet (2.4 m) long, usually square in cross section, untapered, at one inch in width per foot of length.
- 1730–1780 CE: The boomkin grew longer, with an octagonal inboard end and a circular outboard end tapering to 3/4 its initial diameter by its tip.
- 1780–1805 CE: The boomkin often became circular in cross section from base to tip.
- 1805 CE: The boomkin's inboard end was made half-round and generally bolted to rather than butted against the knighthead. An iron band with eyelets for (typically three) boomkin shrouds was also introduced.
- 1825 CE: The boomkin reverted to being square-edged, usually one inch wider than it was high. It also gained an additional eyelet for securing a slip.
- 1850 CE and beyond: The boomkin began to appear at a vessel's stern to provide either an attachment point for a backstay or the sheet of sail flown from a mizzen mast.
- 1967: Drascombe Lugger yawls designed with boomkins as an attachment point for sail flown from the mizzen.
