= Leeward 16 =

Sailboat class

Development
- Designer: Luger Industries
- Location: United States
- Year: 1962
- Builder: Luger Industries
- Role: Sailing dinghy
- Name: Leeward 16

Boat
- Displacement: 650 lb (295 kg)
- Draft: 2.92 ft (0.89 m) with the centerboard down

Hull
- Type: Monohull
- Construction: Fiberglass
- LOA: 16.00 ft (4.88 m)
- LWL: 15.00 ft (4.57 m)
- Beam: 6.25 ft (1.91 m)

Hull appendages
- Keel: centerboard
- Rudder: transom-mounted rudder

Rig
- Rig type: Bermuda rig

Sails
- Sailplan: Fractional rigged sloop
- Mainsail area: 95 sq ft (8.8 m^{2})
- Jib/genoa area: 73 sq ft (6.8 m^{2})
- Total sail area: 168 sq ft (15.6 m^{2})

Racing
- D-PN: 112.3

The Leeward 16 is an American sailing dinghy that was designed by Luger Industries and first built in 1962.

== Production ==
The design was built by Luger Industries in Burnsville, Minnesota, United States starting in 1962. The company produced it as a kit boat for amateur construction, which the building time estimated at 10–15 hours. The company went out of business in 1987 and the boat is now out of production.

== Design ==
The Leeward 16 is a recreational sailboat, built predominantly of fiberglass, with wood trim. It has a fractional sloop rig with anodized aluminum spars. The hull features a spooned raked stem, a conventional transom, a rounded, transom-hung rudder controlled by a tiller and a retractable centerboard. It displaces 650 lb (295 kg) and has an angular cuddy cabin for stowage.

The boat has a draft of 2.92 ft (0.89 m) with the centerboard extended and 1.50 ft (0.46 m) with it retracted. With the non-folding rudder removed it has a draft of 4 in (10 cm), allowing beaching. Ground transportation on a trailer is facilitated by a hinged tabernacle that permits easy lowering of the mast by easing the forestay.

A motor mount was a factory option, allowing fitting a small outboard motor of 2 to 7 hp (1 to 5 kW) for docking and maneuvering. Other factory options included sails, trim molding and running lights for night operation. Foam for hull buoyancy was recommended to make the boat unsinkable.

For sailing the design is equipped with mainsail roller reefing around the boom. The jib sheets, mainsheet and the centerboard raising and lowering lines are all controlled from the cockpit. The supplied assembly kit included stainless steel and anodized aluminum fittings.

The design has a Portsmouth Yardstick racing average handicap of 112.3 and is normally raced with a crew of two sailors.

== Operational history ==
In a 1994 review Richard Sherwood wrote, "Luger Industries buil[t] kit boats [that] rang[e] in length from 8 feet to 30 feet. The Leeward 16 is typical."

Sailrite describes the design, "the Luger Leeward 16 has plenty of cockpit space for the family and enough room in the small cuddy cabin for a picnic basket and cooler. With a modest sail plan the Luger Leeward 16 is an excellent boat for those learning to sail."

== See also ==
- List of sailing boat types

Similar sailboats

- Balboa 16
- Catalina 16.5
- DS-16
- Laguna 16
- Martin 16
- Nordica 16
- Tanzer 16
