= DS-16 =

Sailboat class

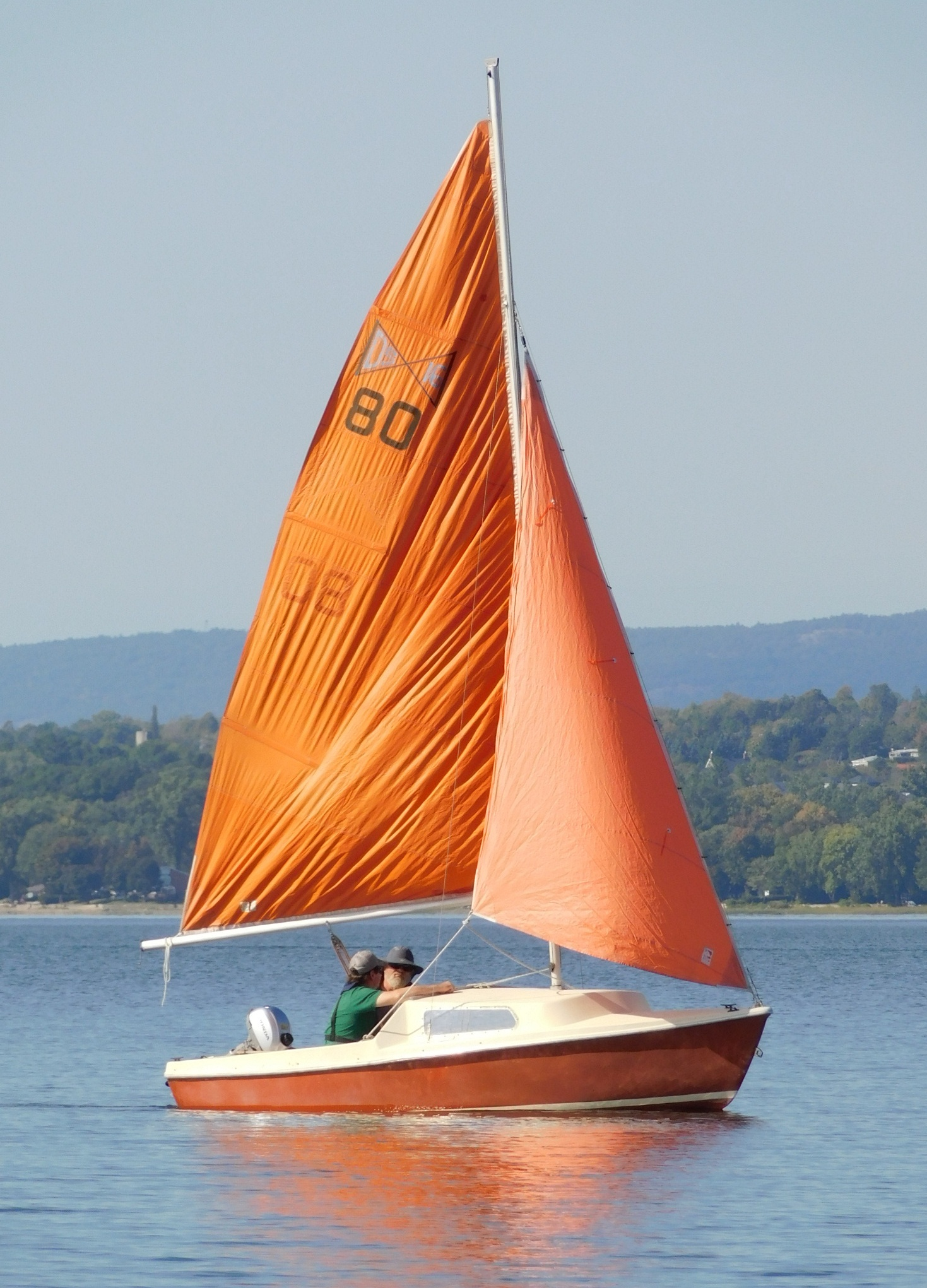

Development
- Designer: G. Diller & Herman Schwill
- Location: Canada
- Year: 1970
- Builder: Diller-Schwill
- Name: DS-16

Boat
- Displacement: 500 lb (227 kg)
- Draft: 4.00 ft (1.22 m) centreboard down

Hull
- Type: Monohull
- Construction: Fiberglass
- LOA: 16.00 ft (4.88 m)
- LWL: 14.33 ft (4.37 m)
- Beam: 6.00 ft (1.83 m)
- Engine: Outboard motor

Hull appendages
- Keel: shallow draft fixed keel or centreboard
- Ballast: 135 lb (61 kg)
- Rudder: transom-mounted rudder

Rig
- General: Fractional rigged sloop

Sails
- Total sail area: 155 sq ft (14.4 m^{2})

The DS-16 is a Canadian trailerable sailboat, that was designed by G. Diller and Herman Schwill and first built in 1970.

== Production ==
The boat was built by Diller-Schwill (DS Yachts) in Odessa, Ontario Canada, but it is now out of production.

== Design ==
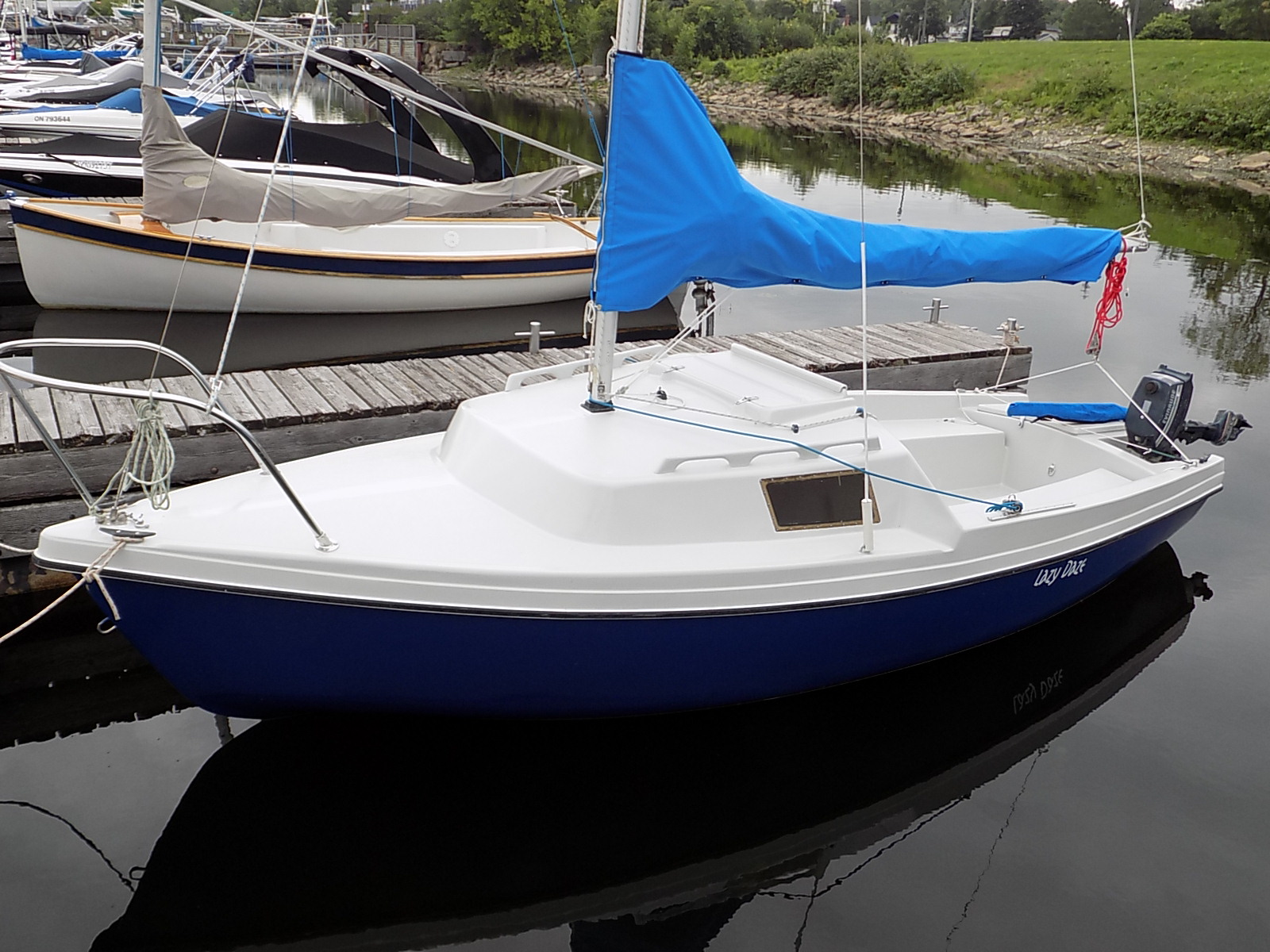
DS-16

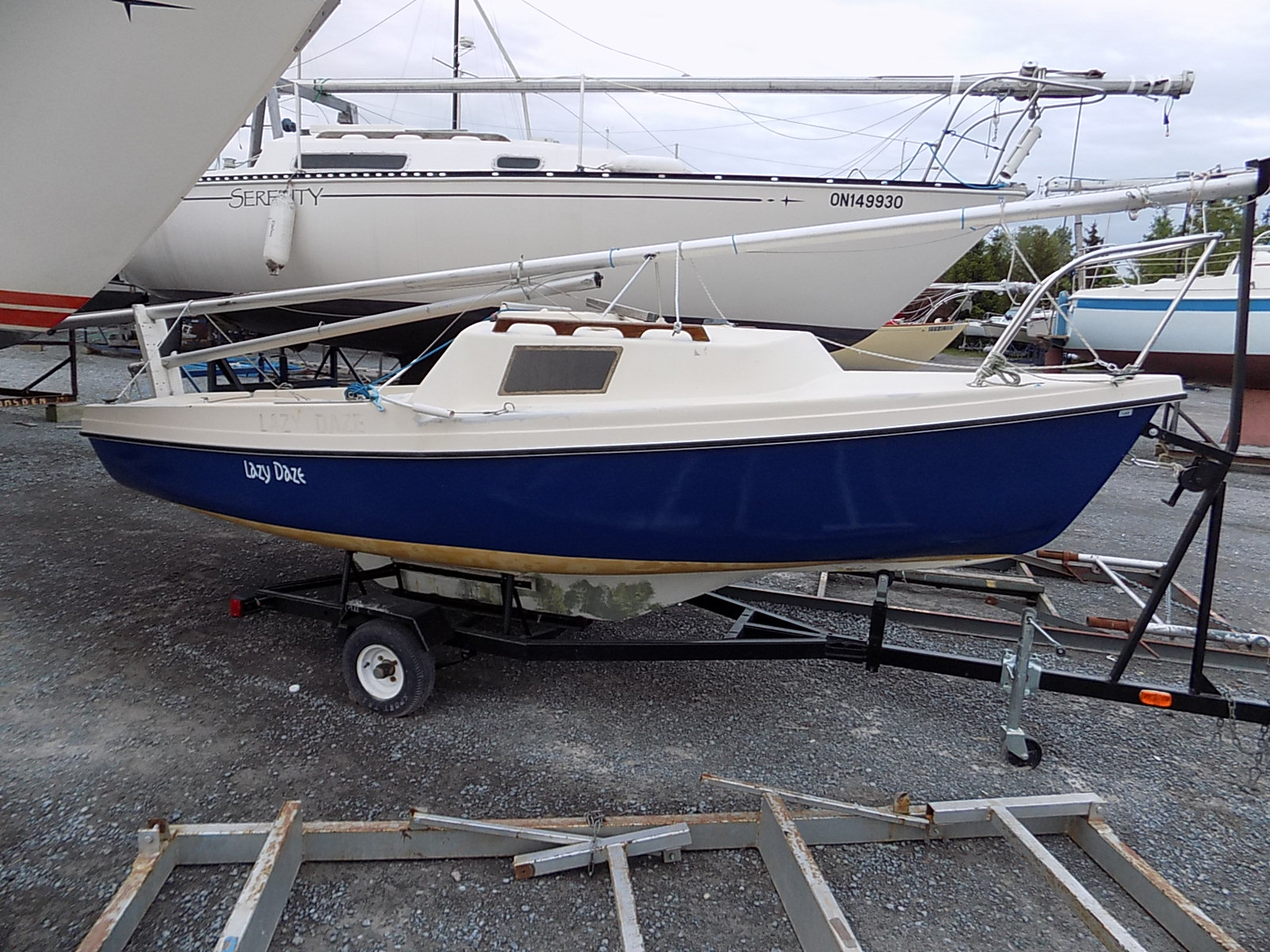
DS-16 with the shallow draft fixed keel, on its road trailer.

The DS-16 is a small recreational keelboat, built predominantly of fiberglass, with wood trim. It has a fractional sloop rig, a transom-hung rudder and a fixed shallow draft keel or optionally a centreboard. It displaces 500 lb (227 kg) and carries 135 lb (61 kg) of ballast.

The centreboard version has a draft of 4.00 ft (1.22 m) with the centreboard extended and 0.58 ft (0.18 m) with it retracted, allowing beaching or ground transportation on a trailer.

The boat is normally fitted with a small outboard motor for docking and maneuvering.

The design has a hull speed of 5.07 kn (9.39 km/h).

== Operational history ==
In a review Michael McGoldrick wrote, "The DS 16 is probably the smallest sailboat with lockable cuddy cabin that you'll find... The cabin has a little over 3 feet (1 metre) of sitting headroom and is supposed to have enough space for a double berth, although it's likely to be extremely cramped for two adults... With a total length of 16 feet (4.88 m) and weight of only 650 pounds (295 kg), it should be possible to trailer the DS 16 with almost any car."

== See also ==
- List of sailing boat types

Related development

- DS-22

Similar sailboats

- Balboa 16
- Bombardier 4.8
- Catalina 16.5
- Laguna 16
- Leeward 16
- Martin 16
- Nordica 16
- Sirocco 15
- Tanzer 16
- Watkins 17
