= Catalina 16.5 =

Series of American sailboats

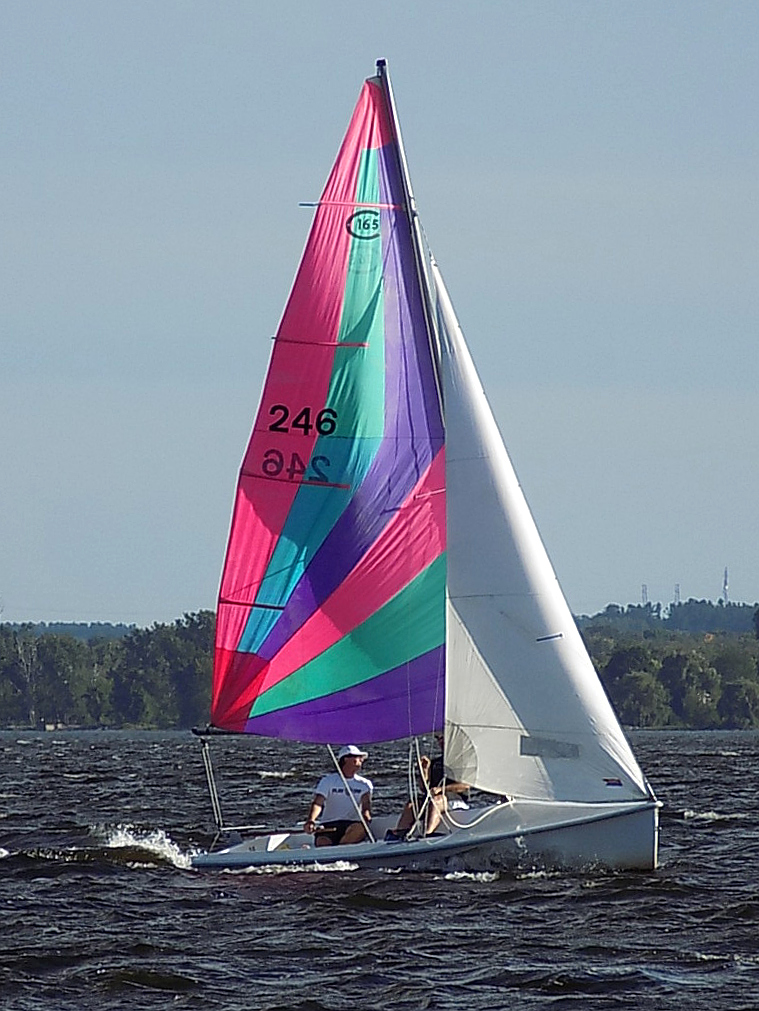

Development
- Designer: Catalina Design Team
- Location: United States
- Year: 1994
- Builder: Catalina Yachts
- Name: Catalina 16.5

Boat
- Crew: 1-4 adults
- Displacement: 430 lb (195 kg)
- Draft: 4.42 ft (1.35 m) centerboard down

Hull
- Type: Monohull
- Construction: Fiberglass
- LOA: 16.33 ft (4.98 m)
- LWL: 15.67 ft (4.78 m)
- Beam: 7.00 ft (2.13 m)
- Engine: Outboard motor

Hull appendages
- Keel: centerboard
- Rudder: transom-mounted rudder

Rig
- General: Fractional rigged sloop
- I foretriangle height: 18.9 ft (5.8 m)
- J foretriangle base: 5.5 ft (1.7 m)
- P mainsail luff: 20.3 ft (6.2 m)
- E mainsail foot: 9.0 ft (2.7 m)

Sails
- Mainsail area: 91.5 sq ft (8.50 m^{2})
- Jib/genoa area: 58.5 sq ft (5.43 m^{2})
- Total sail area: 150 sq ft (14 m^{2})

The Catalina 16.5 is a series of American sailboats, that was designed by the Catalina Design Team and first built in 1994.

The boat is built by Catalina Yachts in the United States, and remained in production in 2017.

== Design ==
The Catalina 16.5 is a small recreational sailing dinghy, built predominantly of fiberglass. It has a fractional sloop rig, a transom-hung rudder and a centerboard or fixed fin keel. All models in the series have a length overall of 16.33 ft (5.0 m), a waterline length of 15.67 ft (4.8 m).

The design can accommodate up to four adults.

The boat comes equipped from the factory with hiking straps, roller furling jib, built-in flotation, a self-bailing cockpit and an anodized mast and boom.

The boat can be fitted with a small outboard motor for docking and maneuvering.

== Variants ==
Capri 16.5
This centerboard-equipped model was introduced in 1994. It displaces 430 lb (195 kg) and carries no ballast. The boat has a draft of 4.42 ft (1.35 m) with the centerboard down and 0.42 ft (0.13 m) with centerboard retracted.
Capri 16.5K
This fixed keel model was introduced in 1995. It displaces 650 lb (295 kg) and carries 250 lb (113 kg) of cast lead ballast. The boat has a draft of 3.00 ft (0.91 m) with the standard fin keel.
Catalina 16.5
This centerboard-equipped model was a renamed Capri 16.5. It displaces 430 lb (195 kg) and carries no ballast. The boat has a draft of 4.42 ft (1.35 m) with the centerboard down and 0.42 ft (0.13 m) with centerboard retracted.
Catalina 16.5K
This fixed keel model was a renamed Capri 16.5K. It displaces 650 lb (295 kg) and carries 250 lb (113 kg) of cast lead ballast. The boat has a draft of 3.00 ft (0.91 m) with the standard fin keel.

== See also ==
- List of sailing boat types

Similar sailboats

- Balboa 16
- Bombardier 4.8
- DS-16
- Laguna 16
- Laser 2
- Leeward 16
- Martin 16
- Nordica 16
- Sirocco 15
- Tanzer 16
