= Tanzer 16 =

Canadian sailboat by Tanzer

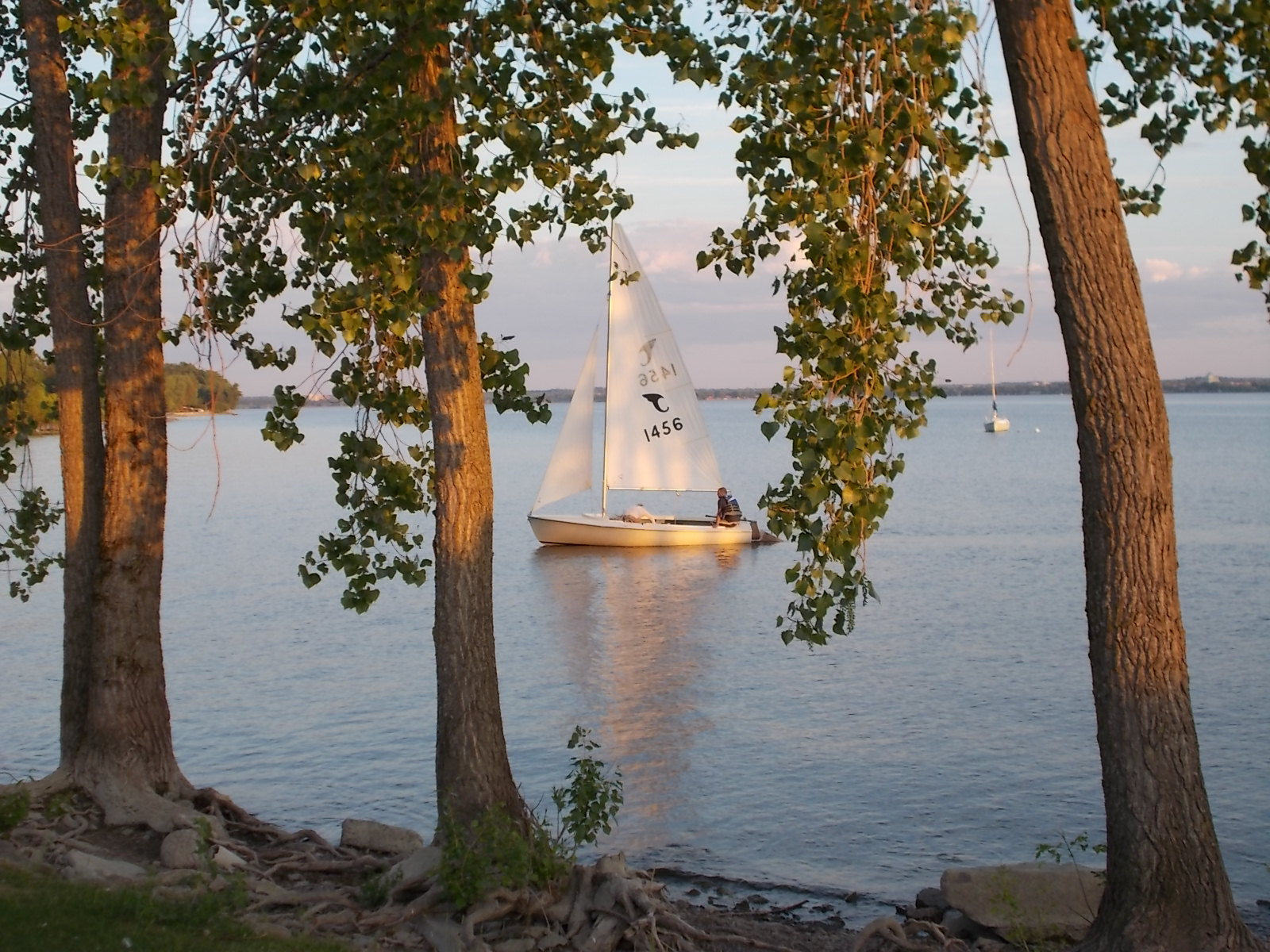

Development
- Designer: Johann Tanzer
- Location: Canada
- Year: 1963
- Builder: Tanzer Industries
- Name: Tanzer 16

Boat
- Crew: Two
- Draft: 2.75 ft (0.84 m)

Hull
- Type: Fractional rigged sloop
- Construction: Fibreglass
- LOA: 16.33 ft (4.98 m)
- LWL: 15.58 ft (4.75 m)
- Beam: 6.17 ft (1.88 m)

Hull appendages
- Keel: centreboard keel

Sails
- Mainsail area: 100 sq ft (9.3 m^{2})
- Jib/genoa area: 35 sq ft (3.3 m^{2})
- Spinnaker area: 205 sq ft (19.0 m^{2})
- Upwind sail area: 135 sq ft (12.5 m^{2})

Racing
- D-PN: 98.3

The Tanzer 16 is a Canadian sailboat, that was designed by Johann Tanzer and first built in 1963. The design is out of production.

Derived from the similar 1963 Constellation 16, the Tanzer 16 design was developed into the Overnighter 16 in 1964, by the addition of a cuddy cabin.

== Production ==
The boat was built by Tanzer Industries in Canada and remained in production until the company went out of business in 1986.

The boat's class association acquired the tooling for the design after Tanzer Industries closed down, but it is unknown if more examples have been produced since then.

== Design ==
The Tanzer 16 is a small recreational sailing dinghy, built predominantly of fibreglass, aluminum spars and oiled teak wood trim. It has a fractional sloop rig, with a roller-reefing boom, a transom-hung kick-up rudder, a spooned stem and a kick-up centreboard keel. It displaces 450 lb (204 kg) and has foam flotation.

The boat has a hull speed of 5.29 kn (9.80 km/h) and is capable of planing. Its broad beam and low centre-of-gravity result in increased stability.

The design has a Portsmouth Yardstick racing average handicap of 98.3.

== Variants ==
Constellation 16
Original Johann Tanzer design of 1963. Length overall 16.33 ft (4.98 m), displacement 450 lb (204 kg).
Tanzer 16
Renamed Constellation 16, 1900 examples were completed. In production 1963–86. Length overall 16.33 ft (4.98 m), displacement 450 lb (204 kg). It has storage available in the lazarette and in the cockpit side compartments, as well as on a shelf under the foredeck.
Overnighter 16
Development of the Tanzer 16, with the addition of sleeping accommodations in the form of a cuddy cabin, with two bunks. 550 examples were built, starting in 1964. Length overall 16.33 ft (4.98 m), displacement 450 lb (204 kg).

== See also ==
- List of sailing boat types

Similar sailboats

- Balboa 16
- Bombardier 4.8
- Catalina 16.5
- DS-16
- Laguna 16
- Leeward 16
- Nordica 16
- Sirocco 15
- Wayfarer (dinghy)
