= Balboa 16 =

Sailboat class

Development
- Designer: W. Shad Turner
- Location: United States
- Year: 1981
- Builder: Coastal Recreation, Inc
- Role: Day sailer
- Name: Balboa 16

Boat
- Displacement: 1,000 lb (454 kg)
- Draft: 2.42 ft (0.74 m)

Hull
- Type: Monohull
- Construction: Fiberglass
- LOA: 16.00 ft (4.88 m)
- LWL: 14.67 ft (4.47 m)
- Beam: 7.50 ft (2.29 m)
- Engine: Outboard motor

Hull appendages
- Keel: fin keel
- Ballast: 400 lb (181 kg)
- Rudder: transom-mounted rudder

Rig
- Rig type: Bermuda rig
- I foretriangle height: 20.00 ft (6.10 m)
- J foretriangle base: 6.50 ft (1.98 m)
- P mainsail luff: 16.00 ft (4.88 m)
- E mainsail foot: 6.60 ft (2.01 m)

Sails
- Sailplan: Masthead sloop
- Mainsail area: 52.00 sq ft (4.831 m^{2})
- Jib/genoa area: 65.00 sq ft (6.039 m^{2})
- Total sail area: 117.00 sq ft (10.870 m^{2})

The Balboa 16 is an American trailerable sailboat that was designed by W. Shad Turner as a day sailer and first built in 1981.

== Production ==
The design was built by Coastal Recreation, Inc in Costa Mesa, California, United States starting in 1981. The company was bought out by Laguna Yachts of Stanton, California and became a subsidiary. Laguna Yachts developed the design into the Laguna 16 in 1984, but went out of business in 1986. The boat is no longer in production.

== Design ==
The Balboa 16 is a small recreational keelboat intended for beginner sailors. It is built predominantly of fiberglass, with wood trim. It has a masthead sloop rig with anodized aluminum spars and a transom-sheeted mainsheet. The hull features a raked stem, a plumb transom, a transom-hung rudder controlled by a tiller, a self-bailing cockpit and a fixed, shallow-draft fin keel. It displaces 1,000 lb (454 kg) and carries 400 lb (181 kg) of ballast.

The boat has a draft of 2.42 ft (0.74 m) with the standard keel fitted. It is normally fitted with a small outboard motor of up to 6 hp (4 kW) for docking and maneuvering.

The design has sleeping accommodation for four people, with a double "V"-berth in the bow cabin, plus two quarter berths. To facilitate ground transportation on a trailer the design has a hinged mast step. Factory standard equipment included an ice box, cabin carpeting and a plexiglass sliding hatch. It is normally raced with a crew of two sailors.

== Operational history ==
In a 1994 review Richard Sherwood wrote, "This day sailer is designed for recreation rather than racing, and it offers overnight accommodation for four in one double and two quarter berths ... The manufacturer suggests the Balboa 16 for beginners."

In a 2010 review Steve Henkel wrote, "the Balboa’s relatively wide beam may help stability a bit, and also provides extra stowage space below. highest of her comp group. Her fixed keel may appeal to novice sailors who don't want to fuss with a centerboard or swing keel and with a relatively high B/D ratio and low SA/D, she may be relatively stable in a breeze. Worst features: Her low SA/D and shallow keel also make her a poor bet for sailing fast or close to the wind in light air. Her shallow (2' 5") fixed keel will make it harder to slide off a trailer, especially on shallow-sloped launching ramps. And because the keel is steel, it will be more difficult and time-consuming to maintain properly, particularly in salt water."

== See also ==
- List of sailing boat types

Related Development

- Balboa 20
- Balboa 21
- Balboa 22
- Balboa 23
- Balboa 24

Similar sailboats

- Catalina 16.5
- DS-16
- Leeward 16
- Martin 16
- Nordica 16
- Tanzer 16
