= Laguna 16 =

Sailboat class

Development
- Designer: W. Shad Turner
- Location: United States
- Year: 1984
- Builder: Laguna Yachts
- Role: Day sailer
- Name: Laguna 16

Boat
- Displacement: 1,000 lb (454 kg)
- Draft: 2.42 ft (0.74 m)

Hull
- Type: Monohull
- Construction: Fiberglass
- LOA: 16.00 ft (4.88 m)
- LWL: 14.67 ft (4.47 m)
- Beam: 7.42 ft (2.26 m)
- Engine: Outboard motor

Hull appendages
- Keel: fin keel
- Ballast: 400 lb (181 kg)
- Rudder: transom-mounted rudder

Rig
- Rig type: Bermuda rig

Sails
- Sailplan: Masthead sloop
- Total sail area: 117.00 sq ft (10.870 m^{2})

The Laguna 16 is an American trailerable sailboat that was designed by W. Shad Turner as a day sailer and first built in 1984.

== Production ==
The design was built by Laguna Yachts in Stanton, California, United States starting in 1981. The company had bought out Coastal Recreation, Inc of Costa Mesa, California and made it a subsidiary. Coastal Recreation's 1981 Balboa 16 design was developed into the Laguna 16 in 1984. Laguna went out of business in 1986 and the design is no longer in production.

== Design ==
The Laguna 16 is a small recreational keelboat. It is built predominantly of fiberglass, with wood trim. It has a masthead sloop rig with anodized aluminum spars and a transom-sheeted mainsheet. The hull features a raked stem, a plumb transom, a transom-hung rudder controlled by a tiller and a fixed, shallow-draft fin keel. It displaces 1,000 lb (454 kg) and carries 400 lb (181 kg) of ballast.

The boat has a draft of 2.42 ft (0.74 m) with the standard keel. It is normally fitted with a small outboard motor for docking and maneuvering.

The design has a hull speed of 5.13 kn (9.50 km/h).

== See also ==
- List of sailing boat types

Similar sailboats

- Catalina 16.5
- DS-16
- Leeward 16
- Martin 16
- Nordica 16
- Tanzer 16
