= Lynx 16 =

Sailboat class

Development
- Designer: Tony Davis
- Location: United States
- Year: 1997
- Builder: Arey's Pond Boat Yard
- Role: Cruiser
- Name: Lynx 16

Boat
- Displacement: 1,800 lb (816 kg)
- Draft: 4.50 ft (1.37 m) with centerboard down

Hull
- Type: monohull
- Construction: fiberglass or wood
- LOA: 16.50 ft (5.03 m)
- LWL: 16.00 ft (4.88 m)
- Beam: 7.92 ft (2.41 m)
- Engine: outboard motor

Hull appendages
- Keel: centerboard
- Ballast: 200 lb (91 kg)
- Rudder: transom-mounted rudder

Rig
- Rig type: Catboat

Sails
- Sailplan: gaff rigged catboat
- Total sail area: 200 sq ft (19 m^{2})

The Lynx 16 is an American trailerable sailboat that was designed by Tony Davis as an daysailer and pocket cruiser, and first built in 1997.

== Production ==
The design has been built since 1997 by Arey's Pond Boat Yard in South Orleans, Massachusetts, United States and remains available as a custom-built boat. The designer is also the owner of the boatyard.

The boat is built in both open cockpit and cuddy cabin configurations.

== Design ==
The Lynx 16 is a recreational centerboard boat, built predominantly of fiberglass, with wooden trim of teak, mahogany or oak. Optionally the hull can be made entirely of cold-molded cedar strip and fir wood. It is a gaff rigged catboat with Sitka spruce spars. The hull has a plumb stem, a slightly angled transom, a transom-hung, "barn door" rudder controlled by an ash wood and mahogany tiller and a retractable centerboard. It displaces 1,800 lb (816 kg) and carries 200 lb (91 kg) of ballast. The boat has foam flotation for positive buoyancy.

The boat has a draft of 4.50 ft (1.37 m) with the centerboard extended and 1.17 ft (0.36 m) with it retracted, allowing operation in shallow water, beaching or ground transportation on a trailer.

The boat is normally fitted with a small 2 to 6 hp (1 to 4 kW) outboard motor for docking and maneuvering. It may also been fitted with a 48v electric motor, such as a direct drive 3.7 kW (5 hp).

The cuddy cabin design has sleeping accommodation for two people, with two 76 in (193 cm) berths and a portable type head. Cabin headroom is 40 in (102 cm).

The design has a hull speed of 5.4 kn (10.0 km/h).

== Operational history ==
In a 2003 review naval architect Robert Perry wrote, "this cat was designed by G. Anthony Davis. Mr. Davis should feel lucky that I am not going to show his hand-drafted drawings to my junior high school mechanical drawing teacher Mr. Kibby. Shame, Mr. Davis. You should take more pride with your drafting. The finished boat is a gem, but I like to see well-crafted drawings. It is clear that the hull lines were developed on a computer ... This boat is built to last. Trim and detailing are beautiful and add to the traditional charm of this boat ... The Lynx has distinctive catboat character - exciting and fun to sail."

In a 2010 review Steve Henkel wrote, "this small catboat is from the board of Tony Davis, a relatively new designer who also happens to be owner and operator of Arey’s Pond Boat Yard in South Orleans on Cape Cod. Arey’s Pond builds the boat—but only a few have been built so far, so the jury is still out on how she stacks up against the competition. Best features: This is a good-looking catboat, particularly if she is dolled up with the optional (but, alas, extravagantly expensive) mahogany or oak trim, tanbark sail, nine coats of varnish on the wood (the varnish being a thousand-dollar-plus extra all by itself), teak centerboard enclosure with louvered doors (another $1,000), etc ... Worst features: Compared with her comp[etitor]s, her lower displacement will make her less stable and bouncier. She has less space below, and is relatively expensive. Our guess is that she won't perform as well as the huskier Marshall Sanderling or Menger Cat, particularly in heavy air, and may not do as well in light air either, due to her 20% smaller mainsail. But she sure is pretty."

== See also ==
- List of sailing boat types
