= Classic 26 =

Sailboat class

Development
- Designer: W. Shad Turner
- Location: United States
- Year: 1991
- No. built: 41
- Builder: Laguna Yachts
- Role: Cruiser
- Name: Classic 26

Boat
- Displacement: 3,900 lb (1,769 kg)
- Draft: 4.30 ft (1.31 m)

Hull
- Type: monohull
- Construction: fiberglass
- LOA: 25.75 ft (7.85 m)
- LWL: 21.50 ft (6.55 m)
- Beam: 8.33 ft (2.54 m)
- Engine: outboard motor

Hull appendages
- Keel: fin keel
- Ballast: 1,500 lb (680 kg)
- Rudder: transom-mounted rudder

Rig
- Rig type: Bermuda rig
- I foretriangle height: 29.50 ft (8.99 m)
- J foretriangle base: 9.75 ft (2.97 m)
- P mainsail luff: 25.50 ft (7.77 m)
- E mainsail foot: 10.50 ft (3.20 m)

Sails
- Sailplan: masthead sloop
- Mainsail area: 133.88 sq ft (12.438 m^{2})
- Jib/genoa area: 143.81 sq ft (13.360 m^{2})
- Total sail area: 277.69 sq ft (25.798 m^{2})

The Classic 26 is an American sailboat that was designed by W. Shad Turner as a cruiser and first built in 1991.

== Production ==
The design was built by Classic Yachts in Chanute, Kansas, United States, starting in 1991. A total of 41 boats were completed, but it is now out of production.

The Classic 26 is a development of the Laguna 26 and the similar Windrose 26 and was built from the same hull molds acquired by Classic after Laguna Yachts went out of business.

== Design ==
The Classic 26 is a recreational keelboat, built predominantly of fiberglass, with wood trim. It has a masthead sloop rig, a raked stem, a plumb transom, a transom-hung rudder controlled by a tiller and a fixed fin keel. It displaces 3,900 lb (1,769 kg) and carries 1,500 lb (680 kg) of ballast.

The boat has a draft of 4.30 ft (1.31 m) with the standard keel and is normally fitted with a small outboard motor for docking and maneuvering.

The design has a hull speed of 6.21 kn (11.50 km/h).

== See also ==
- List of sailing boat types
