= Classic Yachts =

Sailboat builder

- Company type: Privately held company
- Industry: Boat building
- Founded: 1988
- Founder: John Heaton
- Defunct: 2000
- Fate: Out of business following a factory fire
- Headquarters: Chanute, Kansas, United States
- Key people: President: John Heaton
- Products: Sailboats

Classic Yachts was an American boat builder based in Chanute, Kansas. The company specialized in the manufacture of fiberglass sailboats.

The company was founded by John Heaton in 1988 and went out of business in 2000.

== History ==
Heaton started out as a dealer for Laguna Yachts based in Stanton, California and for Gloucester Yachts of Newport Beach, California. Laguna had also bought out a competitor, Coastal Recreation of Costa Mesa, California, in 1981. Laguna Yachts went out of business in 1986 and Gloucester Yachts in 1988, leaving Heaton with no companies to represent. He bought the molds and tooling for some of the designs and produced three of his own boats as "Classics" until a factory fire in 2000 ended the business.

The first design produced was the Classic 22 (Windley) in 1989, followed by the Classic 26 in 1991 and the larger Classic 33 in 1996.

The Classic 22 (Windley) sailboat design is a development of the Gloucester 22, that had been built by Gloucester Yachts from 1983 to 1988. The Classic 26 was based on the Laguna 26 and also the similar Windrose 26, both built by Laguna Yachts from 1982 to 1988. The Classic 33 used the Laguna 33 molds. The Laguna 33 had been produced by Laguna in 1986, just before that company went out of business.

== Boats ==
Summary of boats built by Classic Yachts:

- Classic 22 (Windley) - 1989
- Classic 26 - 1991
- Classic 33 - 1996

== See also ==
- List of sailboat designers and manufacturers
