= Classic 33 =

Sailboat class

Development
- Designer: W. Shad Turner
- Location: United States
- Year: 1995
- Builder: Classic Yachts
- Role: Cruiser
- Name: Classic 33

Boat
- Displacement: 9,590 lb (4,350 kg)
- Draft: 4.00 ft (1.22 m)

Hull
- Type: monohull
- Construction: fiberglass
- LOA: 32.92 ft (10.03 m)
- LWL: 27.50 ft (8.38 m)
- Beam: 10.67 ft (3.25 m)
- Engine: Yanmar 18 hp (13 kW) diesel engine

Hull appendages
- Keel: fin keel
- Ballast: 3,050 lb (1,383 kg)
- Rudder: internally-mounted spade-type rudder

Rig
- Rig type: Bermuda rig
- I foretriangle height: 41.00 ft (12.50 m)
- J foretriangle base: 11.50 ft (3.51 m)
- P mainsail luff: 36.00 ft (10.97 m)
- E mainsail foot: 12.00 ft (3.66 m)

Sails
- Sailplan: masthead sloop
- Mainsail area: 216.00 sq ft (20.067 m^{2})
- Jib/genoa area: 235.75 sq ft (21.902 m^{2})
- Total sail area: 451.75 sq ft (41.969 m^{2})

The Classic 33 is an American sailboat that was designed by W. Shad Turner as a cruiser and first built in 1995.

The design is a development of the Laguna 33, using the same molds, which Classic Yachts acquired after Laguna Yachts went out of business.

== Production ==
The design was built by Classic Yachts in Chanute, Kansas, United States, starting in 1995, but it is now out of production. It is not known how many were completed before Classic Yachts closed down in 2000.

== Design ==
The Classic 33 is a recreational keelboat, built predominantly of fiberglass, with wood trim. It has a masthead sloop rig, a raked stem, a reverse transom, an internally mounted spade-type rudder controlled by a wheel and a fixed fin keel. It displaces 9,590 lb (4,350 kg) and carries 3,050 lb (1,383 kg) of ballast.

The boat has a draft of 4.00 ft (1.22 m) with the standard keel.

The boat is fitted with a Japanese Yanmar diesel engine of 18 hp (13 kW) for docking and maneuvering.

The design has a hull speed of 7.03 kn (13.02 km/h).

== See also ==
- List of sailing boat types
