= Balboa 22 =

Sailboat class

Development
- Designer: W. Shad Turner and William M. Downing
- Location: United States
- Year: 1977
- Builder: Coastal Recreation, Inc
- Role: Cruiser
- Name: Balboa 22

Boat
- Displacement: 1,980 lb (898 kg)
- Draft: 5.50 ft (1.68 m) with swing keel down

Hull
- Type: monohull
- Construction: fiberglass
- LOA: 21.58 ft (6.58 m)
- LWL: 19.00 ft (5.79 m)
- Beam: 8.00 ft (2.44 m)
- Engine: outboard motor

Hull appendages
- Keel: swing keel
- Ballast: 600 lb (272 kg)
- Rudder: transom-mounted rudder

Rig
- Rig type: Bermuda rig

Sails
- Sailplan: fractional rigged sloop
- Total sail area: 206.00 sq ft (19.138 m^{2})

Racing
- PHRF: 246

The Balboa 22 is an American trailerable sailboat that was designed by W. Shad Turner and William M. Downing as a cruiser and first built in 1977.

The design was developed into the Windrose 22 and, with a new deck, the hull was reused for the Laguna 22 in 1983.

== Production ==
The design was built by Coastal Recreation, Inc in the United States, starting in 1977, with production ending in 1979. Laguna Yachts purchased Coastal Recreation, renamed some models, and reused hull molds for other designs, including the Balboa 22's molds.

== Design ==
The Balboa 22 is a recreational keelboat, built predominantly of fiberglass, with wood trim. It has a fractional sloop rig, a raked stem, plumb transom, a transom-hung rudder controlled by a tiller, a "pop-top" cabin and a swing keel or fixed shoal-draft fin keel. The swing keel model displaces 1,980 lb (898 kg) and carries 600 lb (272 kg) of ballast. The fixed keel model displaces 2,280 lb (1,034 kg).

The keel-equipped version of the boat has a draft of 2.92 ft (0.89 m), while the centreboard-equipped version has a draft of 5.50 ft (1.68 m) with the swing keel extended and 1.25 ft (0.38 m) with it retracted, allowing beaching or ground transportation on a trailer.

The boat is normally fitted with a small 3 to 6 hp (2 to 4 kW) outboard motor for docking and maneuvering.

The design has sleeping accommodation for four people. The cabin headroom is 52 in (130 cm) or 72 in (180 cm) with the "pop-top" open.

The Balboa 22 has a PHRF racing average handicap of 246 and a hull speed of 5.8 kn (10.7 km/h).

== Operational history ==
In a 2010 review Steve Henkel wrote of the Balboa 22, "best features: Poptop gives six-foot headroom when erected. Worst features: Construction is below average—definitely not 'yacht quality.'"

== See also ==
- List of sailing boat types

Related development

- Balboa 16
- Balboa 20
- Balboa 21
- Balboa 23
- Balboa 24
