= Challenged Sailors San Diego =

Nonprofit disabled sailing organization

Challenged Sailors San Diego (CSSD) is a California not-for-profit corporation that provides weekly adaptive sailing opportunities for adults and children living with disabilities. The organization offers sailing for free from ten specially adaptive sailboats. For its work enabling people with disabilities to engage in adaptive sailing CSSD earned the 2022 Robie Pierce award from US Sailing.

== Programs ==
CSSD is the only reported adaptive sailing program in the United States which sails every weekend, year-round.

CSSD operates out of Harbor Island on San Diego Bay and focuses on supporting constituent residents of San Diego County. Training, sailing and direct on-the-water support is provided for free to individuals living with Multiple Sclerosis, Cerebral Palsy, Cognitive Impairment, Stroke, ALS, Spinal Cord Injury, Amputation, Traumatic Brain Injury, Vision Impairment or Blindness, Hearing Impairment or Deafness, PTSD and Muscular Dystrophy.

CSSD is an all-volunteer operated program with no paid staff. In 2022 a total of 4,700 volunteer hours served over 150 unique disabled sailors.

CSSD uses a fleet of ten Martin 16 sailboats. Controls within the boat are laid out for access by disabled sailors. For sailors with limited hand & arm capability, a Power Assist system is available. Boats can be steered and sails trimmed using an electric joystick similar to those on power wheelchairs.

In partnership with the KMAC Foundation, CSSD hosts the annual Kyle McArthur memorial regatta. CSSD organizes dedicated group sails for organizations which include Paralyzed Veterans of America, Spinal Network Organization, TRACE, SoCal Adaptive Sports, and Braille Club.

== History ==
CSSD has operated continuously since 2014. In 1995, the Martin 16 sailboat was developed by Vancouver yacht designer Don Martin. The Martin 16 can be controlled conventionally, or by joystick, or through the sip n’ puff interface. CSSD is one of two one-design Martin 16 fleets in the world.

== Awards ==
The 2022 Robie Pierce Award was awarded to CSSD by US Sailing, the national governing body for sailing in the United States. The Robie Pierce Award recognizes each year a single outstanding program for sailors with disabilities. It is given to an organization that has made notable contributions to promote public access sailing for sailors with disabilities.
