= Bombardier 4.8 =

Sailboat class

Development
- Designer: Bombardier Research
- Location: Canada
- Year: 1982
- Builder: Bombardier Limited
- Role: Day sailer

Boat
- Displacement: 300 lb (136 kg)
- Draft: 3.83 ft (1.17 m)

Hull
- Type: Monohull
- Construction: Fibreglass
- LOA: 15.83 ft (4.82 m)
- Beam: 5.00 ft (1.52 m)
- Engine: none

Hull appendages
- Keel: centreboard
- Ballast: none
- Rudders: flip-up, transom-mounted rudder

Rig
- Rig type: Bermuda rig

Sails
- Sailplan: Fractional rigged sloop
- Mainsail area: 82 sq ft (7.6 m^{2})
- Jib/genoa area: 56 sq ft (5.2 m^{2})
- Downwind sail area: 268 sq ft (24.9 m^{2})
- Total sail area: 128 sq ft (11.9 m^{2})

The Bombardier 4.8 is a Canadian sailing dinghy that was designed by Bombardier Research as a day sailer and first built in 1982.

== Production ==
The design was built by Bombardier Limited in Canada, but it is now out of production.

== Design ==
The Bombardier 4.8 is a recreational sailboat, built predominantly of fibreglass, with polyurethane flotation and aluminum spars. It has a fractional sloop rig, a raked stem, a vertical transom, a flip-up, transom-hung rudder controlled by a tiller and a flip-up centreboard keel. It displaces 300 lb (136 kg) and can accommodate four people.

The design features an adjustable outhaul, boom vang, Cunningham and a roller furling genoa. It is also fitted with adjustable hiking straps. There is a small stowage compartment in the bow.

The design employs a vacuum cockpit self-bailer that can be left open when the boat is stationary.

The boat has a draft of 3.83 ft (1.17 m) with the centreboard extended and 0.50 ft (0.15 m) with it retracted, allowing beaching or ground transportation on a trailer.

The design can also mount a spinnaker of 140 sq ft (13 m^{2}).

== See also ==
- List of sailing boat types

Similar sailboats

- Catalina 16.5
- Wayfarer (dinghy)
- DS-16
- Nordica 16
- Tanzer 16
