= Speedball 14 =

Sailboat class

Development
- Designer: W. Shad Turner
- Location: United States
- Year: 1980
- Builder: Laguna Yachts
- Role: Sailing dinghy

Boat
- Displacement: 225 lb (102 kg)
- Draft: 3.00 ft (0.91 m) with centerboard down

Hull
- Type: monohull
- Construction: fiberglass
- LOA: 14.25 ft (4.34 m)
- LWL: 13.50 ft (4.11 m)
- Beam: 5.75 ft (1.75 m)

Hull appendages
- Keel: centerboard
- Rudder: transom-mounted rudder

Rig
- Rig type: Bermuda rig

Sails
- Sailplan: fractional rigged sloop
- Total sail area: 128.00 sq ft (11.892 m^{2})

The Speedball 14 is an American sailing dinghy that was designed by W. Shad Turner and first built in 1980.

== Production ==
The design was built by Laguna Yachts in the United States, starting in 1980, but it is now out of production.

== Design ==
The Speedball 14 is a recreational sailboat, built predominantly of fiberglass. It has a fractional sloop rig, a raked stem, a plumb transom, a transom-hung rudder controlled by a tiller and a retractable centerboard. It displaces 225 lb (102 kg).

The boat has a draft of 3.00 ft (0.91 m) with the centerboard extended and 4 in (10 cm) with it retracted, allowing operation in shallow water, beaching or ground transportation on a trailer.

The design has a hull speed of 4.92 kn (9.11 km/h).

== See also ==
- List of sailing boat types
