= Laguna 24S =

Sailboat class

Development
- Designer: W. Shad Turner
- Location: United States
- Year: 1980
- No. built: 350
- Builder: Laguna Yachts
- Role: Cruiser
- Name: Laguna 24S

Boat
- Displacement: 2,600 lb (1,179 kg)
- Draft: 2.92 ft (0.89 m)

Hull
- Type: monohull
- Construction: fiberglass
- LOA: 23.58 ft (7.19 m)
- LWL: 20.00 ft (6.10 m)
- Beam: 8.33 ft (2.54 m)
- Engine: outboard motor

Hull appendages
- Keel: fin keel
- Ballast: 900 lb (408 kg)
- Rudder: transom-mounted rudder

Rig
- Rig type: Bermuda rig
- I foretriangle height: 24.00 ft (7.32 m)
- J foretriangle base: 8.75 ft (2.67 m)
- P mainsail luff: 23.00 ft (7.01 m)
- E mainsail foot: 10.00 ft (3.05 m)

Sails
- Sailplan: fractional rigged sloop
- Mainsail area: 115.00 sq ft (10.684 m^{2})
- Jib/genoa area: 105.00 sq ft (9.755 m^{2})
- Total sail area: 220.00 sq ft (20.439 m^{2})

The Laguna 24S is an American trailerable sailboat that was designed by W. Shad Turner as a cruiser and first built in 1980.

The same basic design was used for the Balboa 24 in 1981.

== Production ==
The design was built by Laguna Yachts in the United States, from 1980 to 1987 with 350 boats completed, but it is now out of production.

== Design ==
The Laguna 24S is a recreational keelboat, built predominantly of fiberglass, with wood trim. It has a fractional sloop rig, a raked stem, a plumb transom, a transom-hung rudder controlled by a tiller and a fixed fin keel. It displaces 3,600 lb (1,633 kg) and carries 900 lb (408 kg) of ballast.

The Laguna 24ST model has a mast that is about 1.6 ft (49 cm) taller.

The boat has a draft of 2.92 ft (0.89 m) with the standard shoal draft keel and is normally fitted with a small outboard motor for docking and maneuvering.

The design has a hull speed of 5.99 kn (11.09 km/h).

== Variants ==
Laguna 24S
This model was introduced in 1980. It displaces 2,600 lb (1,179 kg) and carries 900 lb (408 kg) of ballast.
Laguna 24ST
This tall mast model has a mast about 1.6 ft (49 cm) taller, 200 lb (91 kg) more ballast and was introduced in 1984. It displaces 2,800 lb (1,270 kg) and carries 1,100 lb (499 kg) of ballast.

== See also ==
- List of sailing boat types
