= DS-22 =

Sailboat class

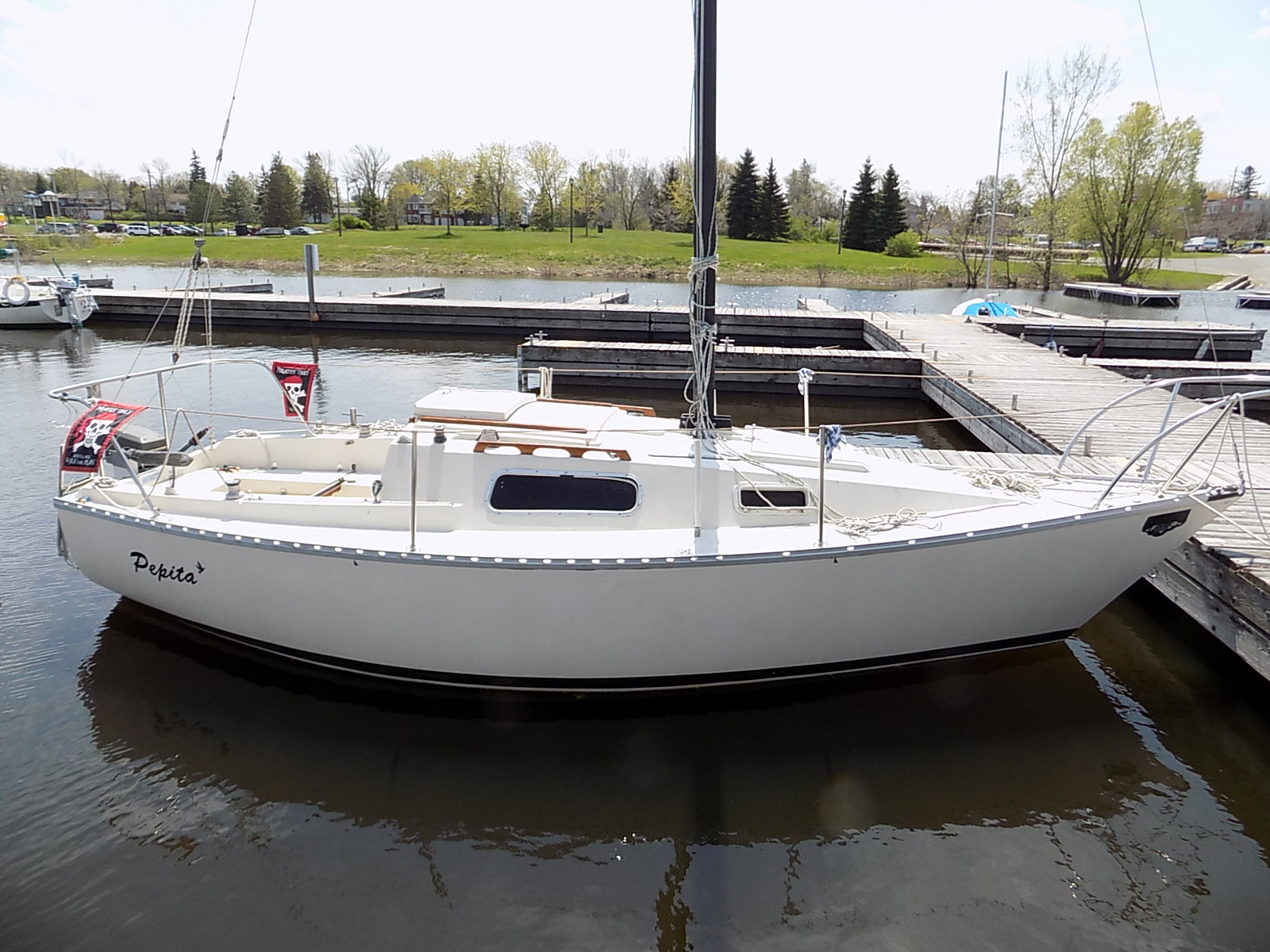

Development
- Designer: Bruce Kirby
- Location: Canada
- Year: 1983
- Builder: Diller-Schwill
- Name: DS-22

Boat
- Displacement: 2,400 lb (1,089 kg)
- Draft: 4.50 ft (1.37 m) with centreboard down

Hull
- Type: Monohull
- Construction: Fiberglass
- LOA: 21.67 ft (6.61 m)
- LWL: 18.50 ft (5.64 m)
- Beam: 8.00 ft (2.44 m)
- Engine: Outboard motor

Hull appendages
- Keel: fin keel with centreboard
- Ballast: 890 lb (404 kg)
- Rudder: Transom-mounted rudder

Rig
- General: Masthead sloop
- I foretriangle height: 27.00 ft (8.23 m)
- J foretriangle base: 9.30 ft (2.83 m)
- P mainsail luff: 22.80 ft (6.95 m)
- E mainsail foot: 7.80 ft (2.38 m)

Sails
- Mainsail area: 88.92 sq ft (8.261 m^{2})
- Jib/genoa area: 125.55 sq ft (11.664 m^{2})
- Total sail area: 214.47 sq ft (19.925 m^{2})

Racing
- PHRF: 255 (average)

The DS-22 is a Canadian trailerable sailboat, that was designed by Bruce Kirby and first built in 1983.

The DS-22 is a development of the 1976 Vision 660.

== Production ==
The boat was built by Diller-Schwill in Odessa, Ontario, Canada, but it is now out of production.

== Design ==
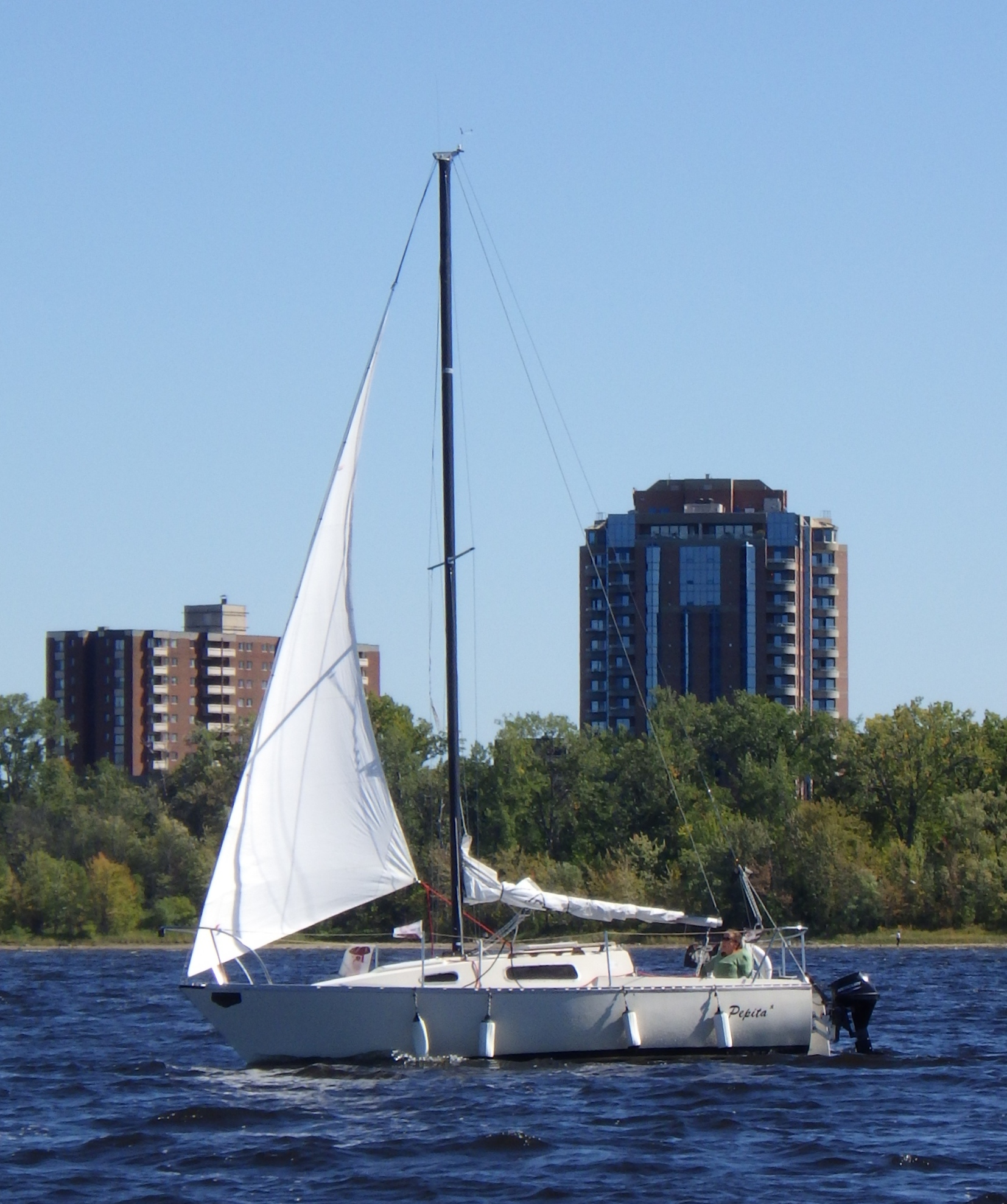
A DS-22 sailing with jib-only.

The DS-22 is a small recreational keelboat, built predominantly of fiberglass, with wood trim. It has a masthead sloop rig, a transom-hung rudder and a fixed keel with a centreboard. It displaces 2,400 lb (1,089 kg) and carries 890 lb (404 kg) of ballast.

The boat has a draft of 4.50 ft (1.37 m) with the centreboard extended and 2.0 ft (0.61 m) with it retracted.

The boat is normally fitted with a small outboard motor for docking and maneuvering.

The boat has a PHRF racing average handicap of 255 with a high of 252 and low of 258. It has a hull speed of 5.76 kn (10.67 km/h).

== Operational history ==
In a review Michael McGoldrick wrote, "The DS 22 is good looking boat with a swing keel and sensible cabin layout. Some of these boat were built with a main hatch which lifted to provide over 6 feet (1.9m) of headroom in the cabin."

== See also ==
- List of sailing boat types

Related development

- DS-16
