= Windrose 24 =

American trailer sailer built 1974–1983

Development
- Designer: W. Shad Turner
- Location: United States
- Year: 1974
- Builder: Laguna Yachts
- Role: Cruiser

Boat
- Displacement: 2,400 lb (1,089 kg)
- Draft: 5.08 ft (1.55 m)

Hull
- Type: monohull
- Construction: fiberglass
- LOA: 24.00 ft (7.32 m)
- LWL: 21.42 ft (6.53 m)
- Beam: 7.82 ft (2.38 m)
- Engine: outboard motor

Hull appendages
- Keel: swing keel
- Ballast: 700 lb (318 kg)
- Rudder: transom-mounted rudder

Rig
- Rig type: Bermuda rig
- I foretriangle height: 22.00 ft (6.71 m)
- J foretriangle base: 8.75 ft (2.67 m)
- P mainsail luff: 25.00 ft (7.62 m)
- E mainsail foot: 10.25 ft (3.12 m)

Sails
- Sailplan: fractional rigged sloop
- Mainsail area: 128.13 sq ft (11.904 m^{2})
- Jib/genoa area: 96.25 sq ft (8.942 m^{2})
- Total sail area: 224.38 sq ft (20.846 m^{2})

Racing
- PHRF: 252

The Windrose 24 is a recreational keelboat built by Laguna Yachts in the United States between 1974 and 1983.

Designed by W. Shad Turner, THE fiberglass hull has a cabin "pop-top" for increased headroom, a spooned raked stem, a plumb transom, a transom-hung rudder controlled by a tiller and a retractable swing keel.

It has a fractional sloop rig.

The boat has a draft of 5.08 ft (1.55 m) with the keel extended and 1.50 ft (0.46 m) with it retracted.

The design has sleeping accommodation for four people, with a double "V"-berth in the bow cabin and a drop-down dinette table on the port side that forms a double berth. The optional sliding galley is located on the starboard side and is equipped with a two-burner stove, ice box and a sink. The head is located just aft of the bow cabin on the port side. Cabin headroom is 52 in (132 cm) or 70 in (178 cm) with the cabin pop-top open.

The design has a hull speed of 6.3 kn (11.7 km/h).

== Reception ==
In a 2010 review Steve Henkel wrote, "Shad Turner, who in the 1970s and 1980s also designed sailboats for W. D. Schock and Lancer, drew a whole series of boats for Laguna Yachts, including various Windroses, Lagunas, and Balboas. The result was usually, as in this case, a lightweight cruiser, not especially fast or stable, but designed for trailering and easy beaching for a picnic. Best features: Like her comp[etitor]s, the Windrose 24 has a modestly sized sailplan, in keeping with her low (25%) ballast-to-displacement ratio and swing keel of only 600 pounds. She has a poptop, which the builder claimed in brochures gives 6' 2" headroom, but at least one owner measured and got 5' 10". Ah well, either is better than the 4' 4" stooping headroom without the poptop. Worst features: The rudder, which is not retractable when traversing rocky shoals with the board up, is therefore vulnerable to damage. The winch used to raise and lower the 600-pound keel needs frequent maintenance to prevent binding and seizing. Forward V-berth is only big enough for kids."
