= Windrose 18 =

1970s American recreational keelboat

Development
- Designer: W. Shad Turner
- Location: United States
- Year: 1974
- Builder: Laguna Yachts
- Role: Cruiser

Boat
- Displacement: 1,500 lb (680 kg)
- Draft: 4.00 ft (1.22 m) with keel down

Hull
- Type: monohull
- Construction: fiberglass
- LOA: 18.50 ft (5.64 m)
- LWL: 15.83 ft (4.82 m)
- Beam: 7.00 ft (2.13 m)
- Engine: outboard motor

Hull appendages
- Keel: swing keel
- Ballast: 400 lb (181 kg)
- Rudder: transom-mounted rudder

Rig
- Rig type: Bermuda rig
- I foretriangle height: 21.00 ft (6.40 m)
- J foretriangle base: 7.75 ft (2.36 m)
- P mainsail luff: 20.00 ft (6.10 m)
- E mainsail foot: 7.00 ft (2.13 m)

Sails
- Sailplan: fractional rigged sloop
- Mainsail area: 70.00 sq ft (6.503 m^{2})
- Jib/genoa area: 81.38 sq ft (7.560 m^{2})
- Total sail area: 151.38 sq ft (14.064 m^{2})

Racing
- PHRF: 288

The Windrose 18 is a recreational keelboat first built in 1974 by Laguna Yachts in the United States, but it is now out of production.

Designed by W. Shad Turner, it was developed into the Windrose 5.5 in 1977.

The fiberglass hull has a raked stem, a plumb transom, a transom-hung rudder controlled by a tiller and a retractable swing keel.

It has a fractional sloop rig.

The boat has a draft of 4.00 ft (1.22 m) with the keel extended and 1.00 ft (0.30 m) with it retracted, allowing operation in shallow water, beaching or ground transportation on a trailer.

The design has sleeping accommodation for four people, with a double "V"-berth in the bow cabin and two straight settee berths in the main cabin. The optional galley is located on the starboard side and slides under the cockpit when not in use. The head is located in the bow cabin under the "V"-berth. Cabin headroom is 45 in (114 cm).

The design has a hull speed of 5.3 kn (9.8 km/h).

In his 2010 book, The Sailor's Book of Small Cruising Sailboats, author Steve Henkel praised the Windrose 18 as "a showpiece" of Shad Turner's California sailboat design aesthetic, that emphasized "avante garde" modernist styling.
