= Windrose 20 =

1970s American recreational keelboat

Development
- Designer: Ron Holder
- Location: United States
- Year: 1977
- Builder: Laguna Yachts
- Role: Cruiser

Boat
- Displacement: 1,650 lb (748 kg)
- Draft: 4.50 ft (1.37 m)

Hull
- Type: monohull
- Construction: fiberglass
- LOA: 20.00 ft (6.10 m)
- LWL: 16.00 ft (4.88 m)
- Beam: 7.50 ft (2.29 m)
- Engine: outboard motor

Hull appendages
- Keel: stub keel and centerboard
- Rudder: transom-mounted rudder

Rig
- Rig type: Bermuda rig
- I foretriangle height: 21.00 ft (6.40 m)
- J foretriangle base: 8.00 ft (2.44 m)
- P mainsail luff: 21.00 ft (6.40 m)
- E mainsail foot: 8.00 ft (2.44 m)

Sails
- Sailplan: fractional rigged sloop
- Mainsail area: 84.00 sq ft (7.804 m^{2})
- Jib/genoa area: 84.00 sq ft (7.804 m^{2})
- Total sail area: 168.00 sq ft (15.608 m^{2})

The Windrose 20 is a recreational keelboat first built in 1977 by Laguna Yachts in the United States, and now out of production.

== Design ==
Designed by Ron Holder, the fiberglass, hull has a raked stem, a plumb transom, a transom-hung rudder controlled by a tiller and a fixed stub keel and retractable centerboard. It displaces 1,650 lb (748 kg).

The boat has a draft of 4.50 ft (1.37 m) with the centerboard extended and 1.00 ft (0.30 m) with it retracted, allowing operation in shallow water, beaching or ground transportation on a trailer.

The design has sleeping accommodation for four people, with a double "V"-berth in the bow cabin and two straight settee berths in the main cabin. The galley is located on the starboard side amidships. The head is located in the bow cabin on the port side under the "V"-berth.

It has a fractional sloop rig.

The design has a hull speed of 5.36 kn (9.93 km/h).
