= Windrose 5.5 =

1970s recreational keelboat

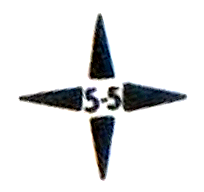

Development
- Designer: W. Shad Turner
- Location: United States
- Year: 1977
- Builder: Laguna Yachts
- Role: Cruiser
- Name: Windrose 5.5

Boat
- Crew: two to four
- Displacement: 1,500 lb (680 kg)
- Draft: 2.25 ft (0.69 m)

Hull
- Type: monohull
- Construction: fiberglass
- LOA: 18.00 ft (5.49 m)
- LWL: 16.00 ft (4.88 m)
- Beam: 8.00 ft (2.44 m)
- Engine: Outboard motor

Hull appendages
- Keel: fin keel
- Ballast: 500 lb (227 kg)
- Rudder: transom-mounted rudder

Rig
- Rig type: Bermuda rig
- I foretriangle height: 21.00 ft (6.40 m)
- J foretriangle base: 6.50 ft (1.98 m)
- P mainsail luff: 20.00 ft (6.10 m)
- E mainsail foot: 8.25 ft (2.51 m)

Sails
- Sailplan: fractional rigged sloop
- Mainsail area: 82.50 sq ft (7.665 m^{2})
- Jib/genoa area: 68.25 sq ft (6.341 m^{2})
- Gennaker area: 92.4 sq ft (8.58 m^{2})
- Total sail area: 150.75 sq ft (14.005 m^{2})

Racing
- PHRF: 288

The Windrose 5.5 is a recreational keelboat first built in 1977 by Laguna Yachts in Stanton, California, United States, but it is now out of production. It was developed from the Windrose 18 and was developed into the Laguna 18 in 1983.

== Design ==
Designed by W. Shad Turner the fiberglass hull has a raked stem, a plumb transom, a transom-hung rudder controlled by a tiller and a fixed fin shoal-draft keel. It displaces 1,500 lb (680 kg) and carries 500 lb (227 kg) of ballast.

The boat has a draft of 2.25 ft (0.69 m) with the standard keel allowing ground transportation on a trailer.

The boat is normally fitted with a small 3 to 6 hp (2 to 4 kW) outboard motor for docking and maneuvering.

The design has sleeping accommodation for four people, with a double "V"-berth in the bow cabin and two quarter berths under the cockpit. The head is located just aft of the companionway steps and is a portable type. Ventilation is provided by a hatch on the foredeck. Cabin headroom is 45 in (114 cm).

The design has a PHRF racing average handicap of 288 and a hull speed of 5.4 kn (10.0 km/h).

It has a fractional sloop rig with a deck-stepped mast and aluminum spars.

== Operational history ==
In a 1994 review Richard Sherwood wrote that the, "Windrose is designed as a little cruiser and has bunks for four, with a double berth forward and two quarter berths. Space remains for cabin seating, shelf storage, and a head. This shoal-draft boat has 500 pounds of ballast in the keel. The manufacturer claims that the special shape of the keel makes Windrose track unusually well."

In a 2010 review Steve Henkel wrote, "by 1980 the design trend was toward wider boats, for extra stability as well as cabin space. Laguna Yachts and Shad Turner responded by widening the six-year-old Windrose 18 ... from seven feet to eight feet, and introducing a number of other changes. Principal among these were (a) eliminating the potentially troublesome steel centerboard and substituting instead a shallow iron-filled keel, and (b) rearranging the cabin space for more elbow room. For example, the portable head was moved aft where its use wouldn't interfere with V-berth sleepers; the settee berths in the '18' were replaced by wider quarter berths and a central seating area. Best features: The new design eliminates worry over centerboard difficulties, and provides more elbow room. Worst features: The fixed keel is too shallow to give good sailing performance compared to the Windrose 18's (despite the fact that PHRF rating for both the 18 and the 5.5 is—unfairly—identical at 288), and the keel makes launching and retrieving at a launching ramp considerably more difficult than with her comps or with the shallower-draft '18'."
