= Laguna 26 =

Sailboat class

Development
- Designer: W. Shad Turner
- Location: United States
- Year: 1982
- No. built: 400
- Builder: Laguna Yachts
- Role: Cruiser

Boat
- Displacement: 3,900 lb (1,769 kg)
- Draft: 3.08 ft (0.94 m)

Hull
- Type: monohull
- Construction: fiberglass
- LOA: 25.75 ft (7.85 m)
- LWL: 21.50 ft (6.55 m)
- Beam: 8.33 ft (2.54 m)

Hull appendages
- Keel: fin keel
- Ballast: 1,500 lb (680 kg)
- Rudder: transom-mounted rudder

Rig
- Rig type: Bermuda rig
- I foretriangle height: 29.50 ft (8.99 m)
- J foretriangle base: 9.80 ft (2.99 m)
- P mainsail luff: 25.00 ft (7.62 m)
- E mainsail foot: 10.50 ft (3.20 m)

Sails
- Sailplan: masthead sloop
- Mainsail area: 131.25 sq ft (12.194 m^{2})
- Jib/genoa area: 144.55 sq ft (13.429 m^{2})
- Total sail area: 275.80 sq ft (25.623 m^{2})

The Laguna 26 is an American sailboat that was designed by W. Shad Turner as a cruiser and first built in 1982.

== Production ==
The design was built by Laguna Yachts in the United States, starting in 1982, with 400 boats completed by the time production ended.

The Windrose 26 is a similar Turner design that was produced by Laguna concurrently. The Classic 26 was built starting in 1991 by Classic Yachts using the old Laguna Yachts tooling.

== Design ==
The Laguna 26 is a recreational keelboat, built predominantly of fiberglass, with wood trim. It has a masthead sloop rig, a raked stem, a plumb transom, a transom-hung rudder controlled by a tiller and a fixed fin keel. It displaces 3,900 lb (1,769 kg) and carries 1,500 lb (680 kg) of ballast.

The boat has a draft of 3.08 ft (0.94 m) with the standard keel.

The design has a hull speed of 6.21 kn (11.50 km/h).

== See also ==
- List of sailing boat types
