= Laguna 18 =

Sailboat class

Development
- Designer: W. Shad Turner
- Location: United States
- Year: 1983
- Builder: Laguna Yachts
- Role: Day sailer-cruiser
- Name: Laguna 18

Boat
- Displacement: 1,500 lb (680 kg)
- Draft: 2.25 ft (0.69 m)

Hull
- Type: monohull
- Construction: fiberglass
- LOA: 18.99 ft (5.79 m)
- LWL: 14.67 ft (4.47 m)
- Beam: 8.00 ft (2.44 m)
- Engine: outboard motor

Hull appendages
- Keel: fin keel
- Ballast: 500 lb (227 kg)
- Rudder: transom-mounted rudder

Rig
- Rig type: Bermuda rig
- I foretriangle height: 21.00 ft (6.40 m)
- J foretriangle base: 6.58 ft (2.01 m)
- P mainsail luff: 20.00 ft (6.10 m)
- E mainsail foot: 8.25 ft (2.51 m)

Sails
- Sailplan: fractional rigged sloop
- Mainsail area: 82.50 sq ft (7.665 m^{2})
- Jib/genoa area: 69.09 sq ft (6.419 m^{2})
- Total sail area: 151.59 sq ft (14.083 m^{2})

The Laguna 18 is an American trailerable sailboat that was designed by W. Shad Turner as a cruiser and daysailer, and first built in 1983.

The Laguna 18 is a development of the Windrose 5.5.

== Production ==
The design was built by Laguna Yachts in the United States, between 1983 and 1987, but it is now out of production.

== Design ==
The Laguna 18 is a recreational keelboat, built predominantly of fiberglass, with wood trim. It has a fractional sloop rig, a raked stem, a plumb transom, a transom-hung rudder controlled by a tiller and a fixed fin keel. It displaces 1,500 lb (680 kg) and carries 500 lb (227 kg) of ballast.

An open cockpit version was also produced for daysailing.

The boat has a draft of 2.25 ft (0.69 m) with the standard shoal draft keel, is normally fitted with a small outboard motor for docking and maneuvering and may be equipped with a series of jibs or genoas.

The design has sleeping accommodation for four people, with a double "V"-berth in the bow cabin and two aft quarter berths under the cockpit.

The boat has a hull speed of 5.13 kn (9.50 km/h).

== See also ==
- List of sailing boat types
