= Windrose 22 =

American recreational keelboat

Development
- Designer: W. Shad Turner
- Location: United States
- Year: 1977
- Builder: Laguna Yachts
- Role: Cruiser
- Name: Windrose 22

Boat
- Displacement: 1,980 lb (898 kg)
- Draft: 5.50 ft (1.68 m) with keel down

Hull
- Type: monohull
- Construction: fiberglass
- LOA: 21.58 ft (6.58 m)
- LWL: 19.00 ft (5.79 m)
- Beam: 8.00 ft (2.44 m)
- Engine: outboard motor

Hull appendages
- Keel: swing keel
- Ballast: 600 lb (272 kg)
- Rudder: transom-mounted rudder

Rig
- Rig type: Bermuda rig
- I foretriangle height: 24.00 ft (7.32 m)
- J foretriangle base: 8.75 ft (2.67 m)
- P mainsail luff: 23.00 ft (7.01 m)
- E mainsail foot: 8.75 ft (2.67 m)

Sails
- Sailplan: fractional rigged sloop
- Mainsail area: 100.63 sq ft (9.349 m^{2})
- Jib/genoa area: 105.00 sq ft (9.755 m^{2})
- Total sail area: 205.63 sq ft (19.104 m^{2})

Racing
- PHRF: 246

The Windrose 22 and Laguna 22 are a series of recreational keelboats. The Windrose 22 was built by Laguna Yachts in the United States, with model years from 1977 and 1987 and the Laguna 22 between 1983 and 1987. The Balboa 22 was originally designed for Coastal Recreation, but the company was bought out by Laguna Yachts in 1981 and many of its boat designs were adapted into new models. Designer W. Shad Turner drew boats for both California-based companies and did adaptations after the buy-out.

The Windrose 22 and Laguna 22 are developments of the Balboa 22, using the same hull molds.

The fiberglass hulls have raked stems, plumb transoms and transom-hung rudders, controlled by a tiller.

They have fractional sloop rigs,

The designs have sleeping accommodation for four people, with a double "V"-berth in the bow cabin and two straight settee berths in the main cabin. The optional sliding galley is located on the starboard side and slides under the cockpit for stowage. The head is located in the bow cabin under the "V"-berth. Cabin headroom is 52 in (132 cm).

The designs have a hull speed of 5.6 kn (10.4 km/h).

== Variants ==
Windrose 22
This swing keel model was introduced in 1977 and built until 1987. It has a length overall of 21.08 ft (6.4 m), a waterline length of 19.00 ft (5.8 m), displaces 1,980 lb (898 kg) and carries 600 lb (272 kg) of ballast. The boat has a draft of 5.50 ft (1.68 m) with the keel down and 1.40 ft (0.43 m) with it retracted.
Windrose 22S
This fixed, shoal-draft, fin model was introduced in 1977 and built until 1987. It has a length overall of 21.08 ft (6.4 m), a waterline length of 19.00 ft (5.8 m), displaces 2,280 lb (1,034 kg) and carries 900 lb (408 kg) of ballast. The boat has a draft of 2.92 ft (0.89 m) with the shoal draft keel.
Laguna 22
This fixed, shoal-draft, fin model has a new cabin top design, made with a new deck mold. It was introduced in 1983 and built until 1987. It has a length overall of 21.58 ft (6.6 m), a waterline length of 19.00 ft (5.8 m), displaces 2,280 lb (1,034 kg) and carries 900 lb (408 kg) of ballast. The boat has a draft of 2.92 ft (0.89 m) with the shoal draft keel.

== Reception ==
In a 2010 review Steve Henkel wrote, "Many skippers like to think of both the Windrose 22 and the Balboa 22 swing keel versions as very similar to both the Catalina 22 ... and the Venture 22 ... There is some merit in this appraisal, except that, while all four of the boats have roughly the same total displacement (about 1,800 to 2,300 pounds), the Windrose and Balboa have considerably more ballast and less structural materials. Best features: These were boats built for economy; used boat prices are lower than average. Worst features: Because the boats were built for economy, workmanship and quality is so-so at best."
