= Windrose 26 =

Sailboat class

Development
- Designer: W. Shad Turner
- Location: United States
- Year: 1982
- Builder: Laguna Yachts
- Role: Cruiser

Boat
- Displacement: 3,600 lb (1,633 kg)
- Draft: 3.08 ft (0.94 m)

Hull
- Type: monohull
- Construction: fiberglass
- LOA: 25.75 ft (7.85 m)
- LWL: 21.50 ft (6.55 m)
- Beam: 8.33 ft (2.54 m)

Hull appendages
- Keel: fin keel
- Ballast: 1,200 lb (544 kg)
- Rudder: transom-mounted rudder

Rig
- Rig type: Bermuda rig
- I foretriangle height: 29.50 ft (8.99 m)
- J foretriangle base: 9.75 ft (2.97 m)
- P mainsail luff: 25.00 ft (7.62 m)
- E mainsail foot: 10.50 ft (3.20 m)

Sails
- Sailplan: masthead sloop
- Mainsail area: 131.25 sq ft (12.194 m^{2})
- Jib/genoa area: 143.81 sq ft (13.360 m^{2})
- Total sail area: 275.06 sq ft (25.554 m^{2})

The Windrose 26 is an American sailboat that was designed by W. Shad Turner as a cruiser and first built in 1982.

== Production ==
The design was built by Laguna Yachts in the United States, starting in 1982, but it is now out of production.

The Windrose 26 is a related design to the Laguna 26 which was produced by the company at the same time. Both designs led to the Classic 26, which was produced by Classic Yachts starting in 1991, using the Laguna molds, after Laguna Yachts went out of business.

== Design ==
The Windrose 26 is a recreational keelboat, built predominantly of fiberglass, with wood trim. It has a masthead sloop rig, a raked stem, a plumb transom, a transom-hung rudder controlled by a tiller and a fixed fin keel. It displaces 3,600 lb (1,633 kg) and carries 1,200 lb (544 kg) of ballast.

The boat has a draft of 3.08 ft (0.94 m) with the standard keel.

The cabin headroom is 6.17 in (16 cm).

For sailing downwind the design may be equipped with a symmetrical spinnaker.

The design has a hull speed of 6.21 kn (11.50 km/h).

== See also ==
- List of sailing boat types
