= Laguna 30 =

Sailboat class

Development
- Designer: W. Shad Turner
- Location: United States
- Year: 1983
- Builder: Laguna Yachts
- Role: Cruiser
- Name: Laguna 30

Boat
- Displacement: 8,700 lb (3,946 kg)
- Draft: 4.00 ft (1.22 m)

Hull
- Type: monohull
- Construction: fiberglass
- LOA: 29.96 ft (9.13 m)
- LWL: 26.00 ft (7.92 m)
- Beam: 10.67 ft (3.25 m)
- Engine: Universal 18 hp (13 kW) diesel engine

Hull appendages
- Keel: fin keel
- Ballast: 2,800 lb (1,270 kg)
- Rudder: internally-mounted spade-type rudder

Rig
- Rig type: Bermuda rig
- I foretriangle height: 39.00 ft (11.89 m)
- J foretriangle base: 11.50 ft (3.51 m)
- P mainsail luff: 34.00 ft (10.36 m)
- E mainsail foot: 12.25 ft (3.73 m)

Sails
- Sailplan: masthead sloop
- Mainsail area: 208.25 sq ft (19.347 m^{2})
- Jib/genoa area: 224.25 sq ft (20.834 m^{2})
- Total sail area: 432.50 sq ft (40.181 m^{2})

The Laguna 30 is an American sailboat that was designed by W. Shad Turner as a cruiser and first built in 1983.

The Laguna 30 design was developed into the Laguna 33 in 1986, with the addition of a reverse transom.

== Production ==
The design was built by Laguna Yachts in the United States, between 1983 and 1987, but it is now out of production.

== Design ==
The Laguna 30 is a recreational keelboat, built predominantly of fiberglass, with wood trim. It has a masthead sloop rig, a raked stem, a plumb transom, an internally mounted spade-type rudder controlled by a wheel and a fixed fin keel. It displaces 8,700 lb (3,946 kg) and carries 2,800 lb (1,270 kg) of ballast.

The boat has a draft of 4.00 ft (1.22 m) with the standard keel.

The boat is fitted with a Universal diesel engine of 18 hp (13 kW) for docking and maneuvering. The fuel tank holds 16 U.S. gallons (61 L; 13 imp gal) and the fresh water tank has a capacity of 31 U.S. gallons (120 L; 26 imp gal).

The design has sleeping accommodation for seven people, with a double "V"-berth in the bow cabin, an U-shaped settee around a drop-down dinette table and a straight settee in the main cabin, plus an aft cabin with a double berth on the starboard side. The galley is located on the port side at the companionway ladder. The galley is U-shaped and is equipped with a two-burner stove, an ice box and a double sink. A navigation station is opposite the galley, on the starboard side. The head is located just aft of the bow cabin on the port side. Cabin headroom is 75 in (191 cm).

The design has a hull speed of 7.09 kn (13.13 km/h).

== See also ==
- List of sailing boat types
