= Laguna 33 =

Sailboat class

Development
- Designer: W. Shad Turner
- Location: United States
- Year: 1986
- Builder: Laguna Yachts
- Role: Cruiser
- Name: Laguna 33

Boat
- Displacement: 9,590 lb (4,350 kg)
- Draft: 4.00 ft (1.22 m)

Hull
- Type: monohull
- Construction: fiberglass
- LOA: 32.92 ft (10.03 m)
- LWL: 27.50 ft (8.38 m)
- Beam: 10.67 ft (3.25 m)
- Engine: Universal 23 hp (17 kW) diesel engine

Hull appendages
- Keel: fin keel
- Ballast: 3,050 lb (1,383 kg)
- Rudder: internally-mounted spade-type rudder

Rig
- Rig type: Bermuda rig
- I foretriangle height: 41.00 ft (12.50 m)
- J foretriangle base: 11.75 ft (3.58 m)
- P mainsail luff: 36.00 ft (10.97 m)
- E mainsail foot: 12.00 ft (3.66 m)

Sails
- Sailplan: masthead sloop
- Mainsail area: 216.00 sq ft (20.067 m^{2})
- Jib/genoa area: 240.88 sq ft (22.378 m^{2})
- Total sail area: 456.88 sq ft (42.446 m^{2})

The Laguna 33 is an American trailerable sailboat that was designed by W. Shad Turner as a cruiser and first built in 1986.

The Laguna 33 is a development of the Laguna 30 with the addition of a reverse transom. It was later developed into the Classic 33 in 1995.

== Production ==
The design was built by Laguna Yachts in the United States, starting in 1986, but the company went out of business the same year and it is now out of production.

== Design ==
The Laguna 33 is a recreational keelboat, built predominantly of fiberglass, with wood trim. It has a masthead sloop rig, a raked stem, a reverse transom, an internally mounted spade-type rudder controlled by a wheel and a fixed fin keel. It displaces 9,590 lb (4,350 kg) and carries 3,050 lb (1,383 kg) of ballast.

The boat has a draft of 4.00 ft (1.22 m) with the standard keel.

The boat is fitted with a Universal diesel engine of 23 hp (17 kW) for docking and maneuvering.

The design has the interior lay-out as the Laguna 30, with sleeping accommodation for seven people, with a double "V"-berth in the bow cabin, an U-shaped settee around a drop-down dinette table and a straight settee in the main cabin, plus an aft cabin with a double berth on the starboard side. The galley is located on the port side at the companionway ladder. The galley is U-shaped and is equipped with a two-burner stove, an ice box and a double sink. A navigation station is opposite the galley, on the starboard side. The head is located just aft of the bow cabin on the port side. Cabin headroom is 75 in (191 cm). The fresh water tank has a capacity of 40 U.S. gallons (150 L; 33 imp gal).

The design has a hull speed of 7.03 kn (13.02 km/h).

== See also ==
- List of sailing boat types
