= Balboa 24 =

Sailboat class

Development
- Designer: W. Shad Turner & William Downing
- Location: United States
- Year: 1981
- Builders: Coastal Recreation, Inc; Laguna Yachts
- Role: Racer-Cruiser
- Name: Balboa 24

Boat
- Crew: two
- Displacement: 2,600 lb (1,179 kg)
- Draft: 2.92 ft (0.89 m)

Hull
- Type: monohull
- Construction: fiberglass
- LOA: 23.58 ft (7.19 m)
- LWL: 20.00 ft (6.10 m)
- Beam: 8.33 ft (2.54 m)
- Engine: Outboard motor

Hull appendages
- Keel: fin keel
- Ballast: 900 lb (408 kg)
- Rudder: transom-mounted rudder

Rig
- Rig type: Bermuda rig
- I foretriangle height: 24.00 ft (7.32 m)
- J foretriangle base: 8.80 ft (2.68 m)
- P mainsail luff: 23.00 ft (7.01 m)
- E mainsail foot: 10.00 ft (3.05 m)

Sails
- Sailplan: fractional rigged sloop
- Mainsail area: 115.00 sq ft (10.684 m^{2})
- Jib/genoa area: 105.60 sq ft (9.811 m^{2})
- Spinnaker area: 360 sq ft (33 m^{2})
- Total sail area: 220.60 sq ft (20.494 m^{2})

Racing
- D-PN: 99.0
- PHRF: 186

The Balboa 24 is a keelboat first built in 1981. It is a development of the similar 1980 Laguna 24S.

== Production ==
The design was built in the United States by Coastal Recreation, Inc in Costa Mesa, California and Laguna Yachts of Stanton, California, which bought out Coastal Recreation. The boat is now out of production.

== Design ==
The Balboa 24 is a recreational trailerable sailboat designed by W. Shad Turner and William Downing as a racer-cruiser, built predominantly of fiberglass, with wood trim. It has a 7/8 fractional sloop rig with anodized aluminum spars. A masthead rig was optional. The hull has a raked stem, a plumb transom, a transom-hung rudder controlled by a tiller and a fixed fin shoal draft keel. The cabin is equipped with a "pop-top". It has a 26.50 ft (8.08 m) mast, displaces 2,600 lb (1,179 kg) and carries 900 lb (408 kg) of ballast. An optional tall rig version with a 28.00 ft (8.53 m) mast and a masthead rig displaces 2,800 lb (1,270 kg) and carries 1,100 lb (499 kg) of ballast.

The boat has a draft of 2.92 ft (0.89 m) with the standard shoal draft keel. It is normally fitted with a small outboard motor for docking and maneuvering.

The design has sleeping accommodation for five people, with a double "V"-berth in the bow cabin, a straight settee in the main cabin and an aft berth on the port side. The galley is located on the starboard side just forward of the companionway ladder. The galley is L-shaped and is equipped with a two-burner, alcohol-fired stove, an ice box and a sink. The head is located just aft of the bow cabin on the starboard side. The interior is trimmed with teak.

Ventilation is provided by a plexiglass hatch on the foredeck and a cabin pop-top that also provides 6 ft (180 cm) of headroom when in the open position.

For sailing the design is equipped with a spinnaker of 360 sq ft (33 m^{2}) or 462 sq ft (42.9 m^{2}) for the tall rig version.

The design has a Portsmouth Yardstick DP-N racing average handicap of 99.0, a PHRF of 186 and is raced with a crew of two sailors.

In a 1994 review Richard Sherwood wrote, "Two rigs are available for this sloop. The first has a 26 1/2-foot mast; the taller rig has a 28-foot mast and 200 additional pounds of ballast. The latter is the better rig for racing."

In a 2010 review Steve Henkel noted that the boat has only 47 in (119 cm) of cabin headroom and a short keel that may reduce upwind performance.
