= Sirocco 15 =

Canadian keelboat first built in 1970

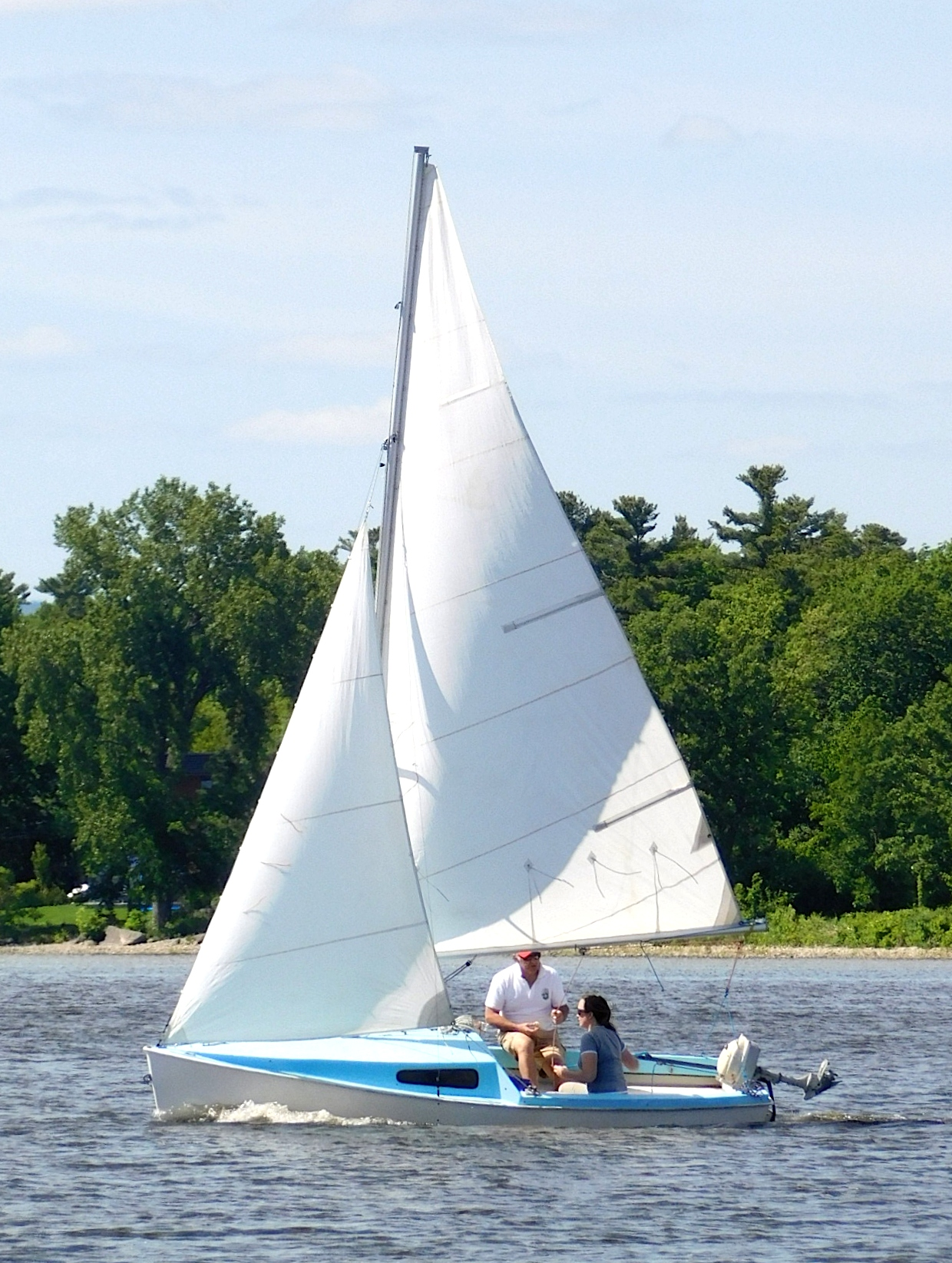

Development
- Location: Canada
- Year: 1970
- No. built: 350
- Builder: Sirocco Boatworks

Boat
- Displacement: 470 lb (213 kg)
- Draft: 3.83 ft (1.17 m) keel down

Hull
- Type: Monohull
- Construction: Fibreglass
- LOA: 15.33 ft (4.67 m)
- LWL: 14.25 ft (4.34 m)
- Beam: 5.92 ft (1.80 m)
- Engine: Outboard motor

Hull appendages
- Keel: swing keel
- Ballast: 75 lb (34 kg)
- Rudder: transom-mounted rudder

Rig
- Rig type: Bermuda rig
- I foretriangle height: 14.75 ft (4.50 m)
- J foretriangle base: 4.33 ft (1.32 m)
- P mainsail luff: 20.08 ft (6.12 m)
- E mainsail foot: 9.66 ft (2.94 m)->

Sails
- Sailplan: Fractional rigged sloop
- Total sail area: 147.00 sq ft (13.657 m^{2})

The Sirocco 15, is a recreational keelboat of which 350 were built starting in 1970 by Sirocco Boatworks in Canada.

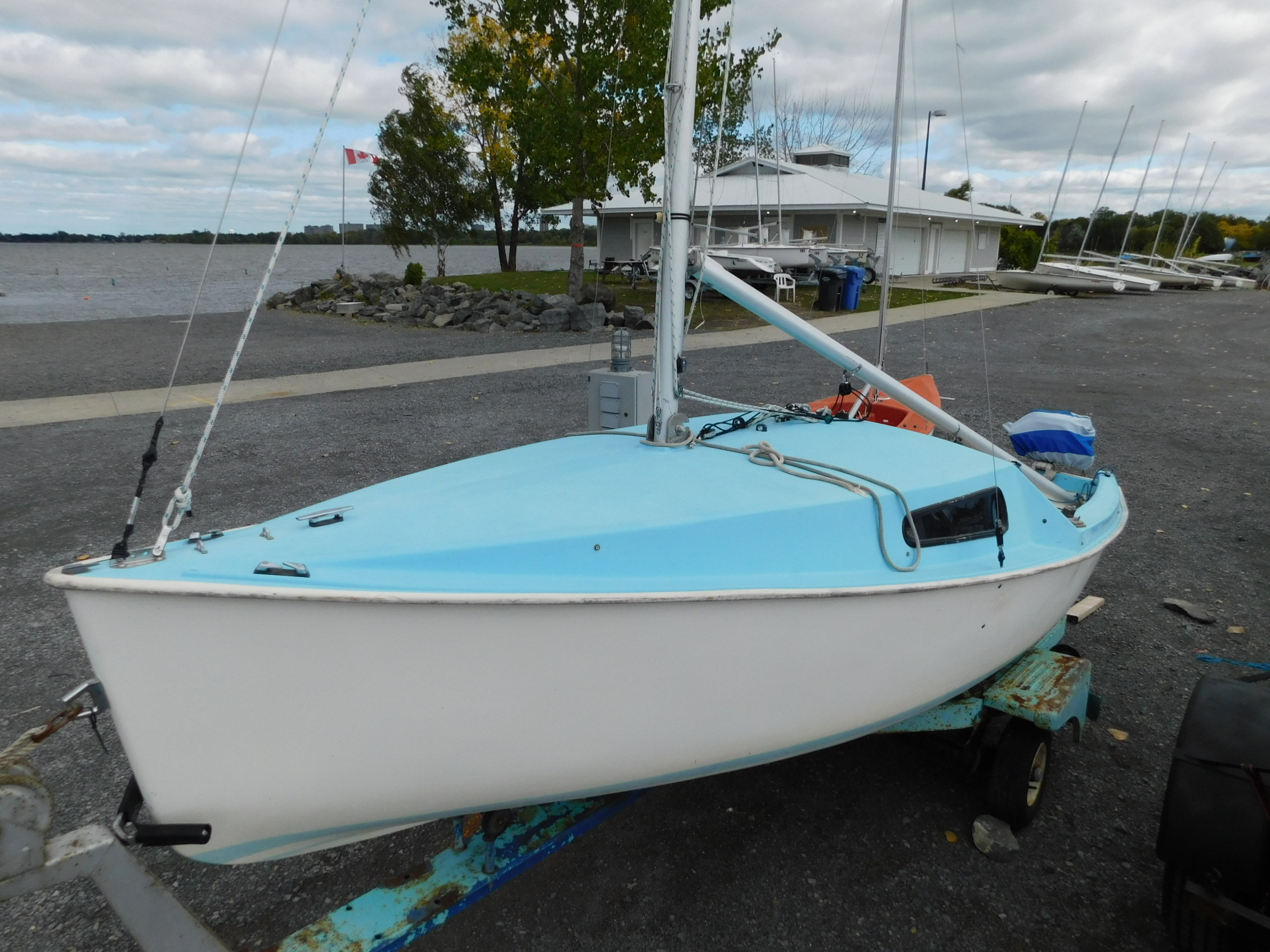
Sirocco 15 on its trailer

The fibreglass hull has a nearly plumb stem, a vertical transom, a transom-hung rudder controlled by a tiller and an iron swing keel. The boat has a cuddy cabin. It displaces 470 lb (213 kg) and carries 75 lb (34 kg) of iron ballast.

The boat has a draft of 3.83 ft (1.17 m) with the keel extended and 0.67 ft (0.20 m) with it retracted, allowing beaching or ground transportation on a trailer.

It has a fractional sloop rig, and may be equipped with a symmetrical spinnaker.

The design has a hull speed of 5.06 kn (9.37 km/h).
