= Laguna Yachts =

Sailboat builder

- Company type: Privately held company
- Industry: Boat building
- Founded: 1973
- Founder: Bill Downing
- Defunct: 1986
- Headquarters: Stanton, California, United States
- Products: Sailboats

Laguna Yachts was an American boat builder based in Stanton, California. The company specialized in the design and manufacture of fiberglass sailboats.

The company was founded by Bill Downing in 1973.

== History ==
The first designs produced were the Windrose 18 and the Windrose 24, both as 1974 models.

In his 2010 book, The Sailor's Book of Small Cruising Sailboats, author Steve Henkel praised Laguna Yacht's Windrose 18 in particular as "a showpiece" of Shad Turner's California sailboat design aesthetic, that emphasized "avante garde" modernist styling, something that was not seen on east coast boats in the same period.

In 1981 the company bought out Coastal Recreation Inc. of Costa Mesa, California. It continued to builder some Coastal Recreation models, adapted others into new models and ceased production of other models.

Laguna Yachts ceased business in 1986, although some of its designs were later built by Classic Yachts of Chanute, Kansas.

== Boats ==
Summary of boats built by Laguna Yachts:

- Windrose 18 - 1974
- Windrose 24 - 1974
- Balboa 22 - 1977
- Windrose 5.5 - 1977
- Windrose 20 - 1977
- Windrose 22 - 1977
- Windrose 22S - 1977
- Laguna 24S - 1980
- Speedball 14 - 1980
- Balboa 16 - 1981
- Balboa 24 - 1981
- Laguna 26 - 1982
- Windrose 26 - 1982
- Laguna 18 - 1983
- Laguna 22 - 1983
- Laguna 30 - 1983
- Laguna 16 - 1984
- Laguna 24ST - 1984
- Laguna 33 - 1986

== See also ==
- List of sailboat designers and manufacturers
