= Cuddy (cabin) =

Small room, particularly on a boat

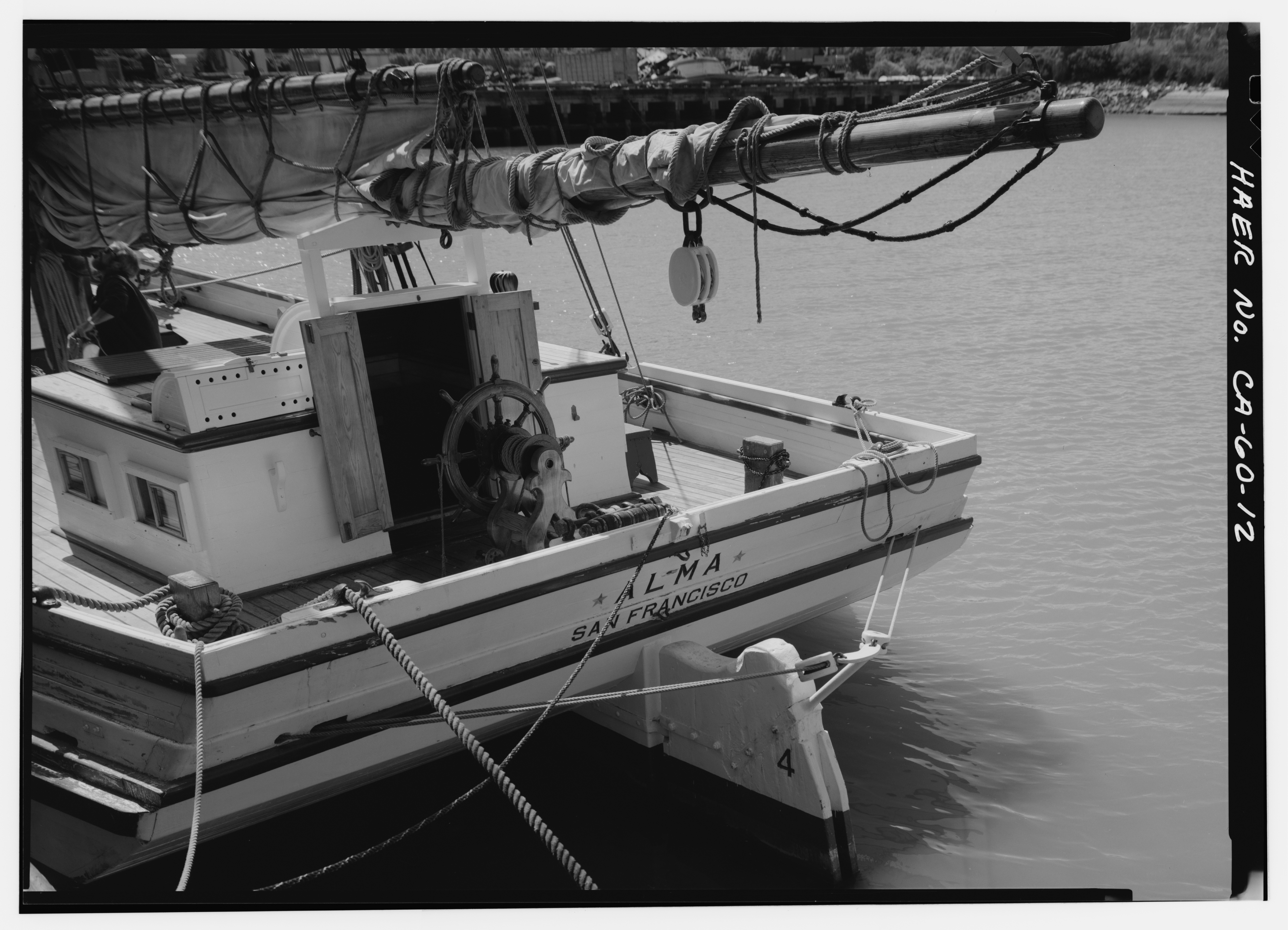
Entrance to the cuddy of a scow

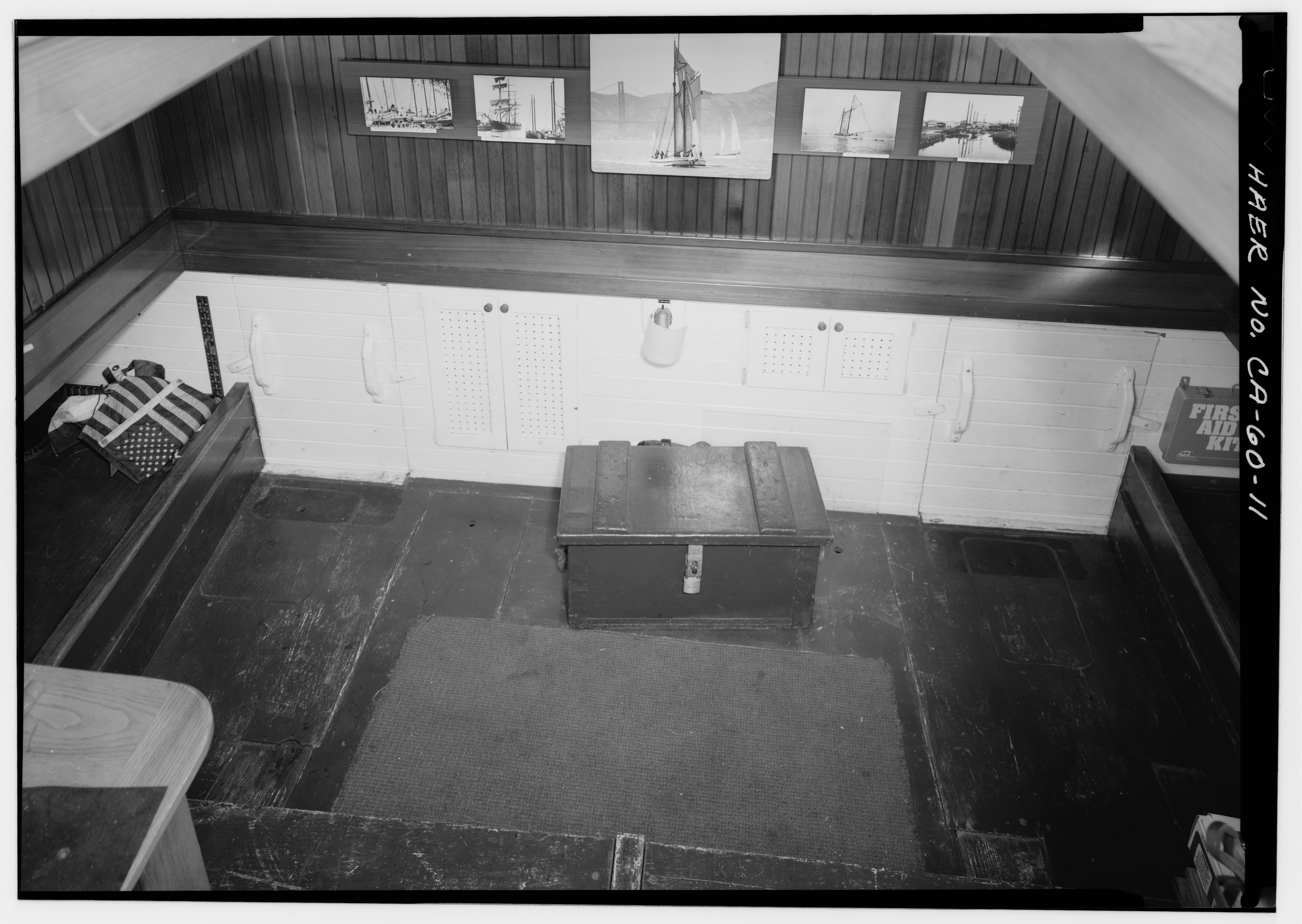
Inside the cuddy of the scow above

A cuddy is a small room or cupboard, especially on a boat. It can also refer to a small, cozy hut. The term's origin is uncertain, but it was used in colonial America as early as 1655. The term may derive from the Dutch kajuit, meaning a small cabin, or from the French cahute, meaning a hut.

== Nautical uses ==
The term cuddy is used particularly in nautical contexts. In the 19th century, it referred to a saloon cabin at the stern of immigrant ships, where wealthy immigrants could travel in greater comfort than the steerage passengers below.

A cuddy boat is a boat with a small shelter cabin with maybe a small head. It may have a small berth also. The cuddy on cuddy boats is usually not tall enough to stand in. Typical lengths of cuddy boats range from 18 to 28 feet (5.5 to 8.5 m). The term "cuddy cabin" is still somewhat used (cuddy itself can mean cabin) and is a common term among small boaters. Cuddy boats are popular as recreational boats with people who want a little shelter and storage space but do not want to upgrade to a full cabin boat. Cuddy cabin fishing boats are also used as near-shore fishing boats.
