= Martin 16 =

Sailboat used for disabled sailor programs

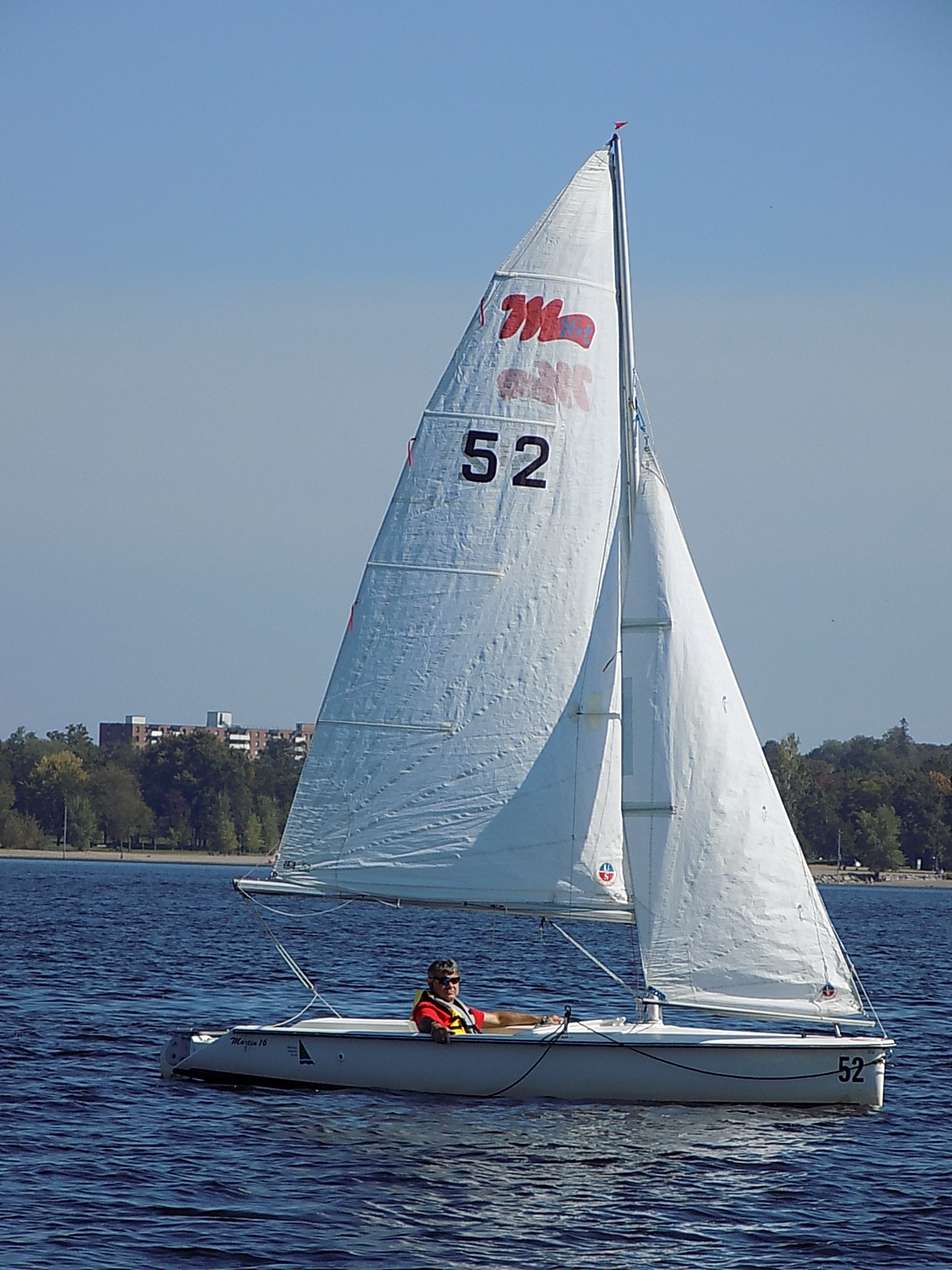

Development
- Designer: Don Martin
- Location: Canada
- Year: 1995
- No. built: 113
- Builders: Martin Yachts; Abbott Boats; KAPE Boatworks
- Name: Martin 16

Boat
- Displacement: 730 lb (331 kg)
- Draft: 3.33 ft (1.01 m) with keel down

Hull
- Type: Monohull
- Construction: Fiberglass
- LOA: 16.00 ft (4.88 m)
- LWL: 16.00 ft (4.88 m)
- Beam: 4.33 ft (1.32 m)
- Engine: none

Hull appendages
- Keel: lifting keel
- Ballast: 330 lb (150 kg)
- Rudder: transom-mounted rudder

Rig
- General: Fractional rigged sloop

Sails
- Total sail area: 100 sq ft (9.3 m^{2})

The Martin 16 is a small Canadian keelboat designed specifically for adaptive and accessible sailing. It was first built in 1995 by Martin Yachts, who completed 58. Production then passed to Abbott Boats, who built 55 boats. The original molds were destroyed in a fire in 2006, but a new set were built in 2009 and production was restarted by KAPE Boatworks. The design remains in production.

== Design ==
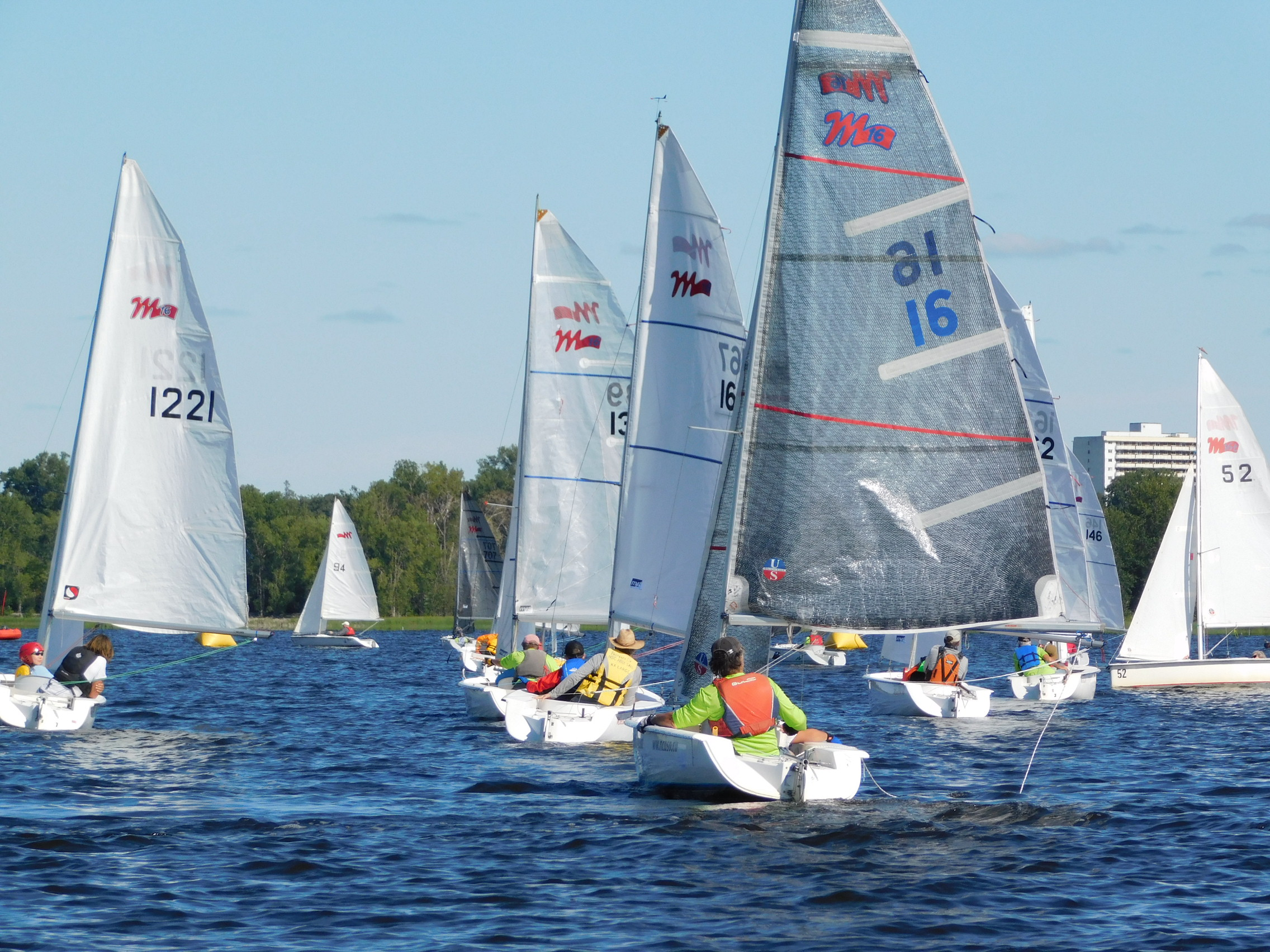
Martin 16s racing in the Mobility Cup 2019

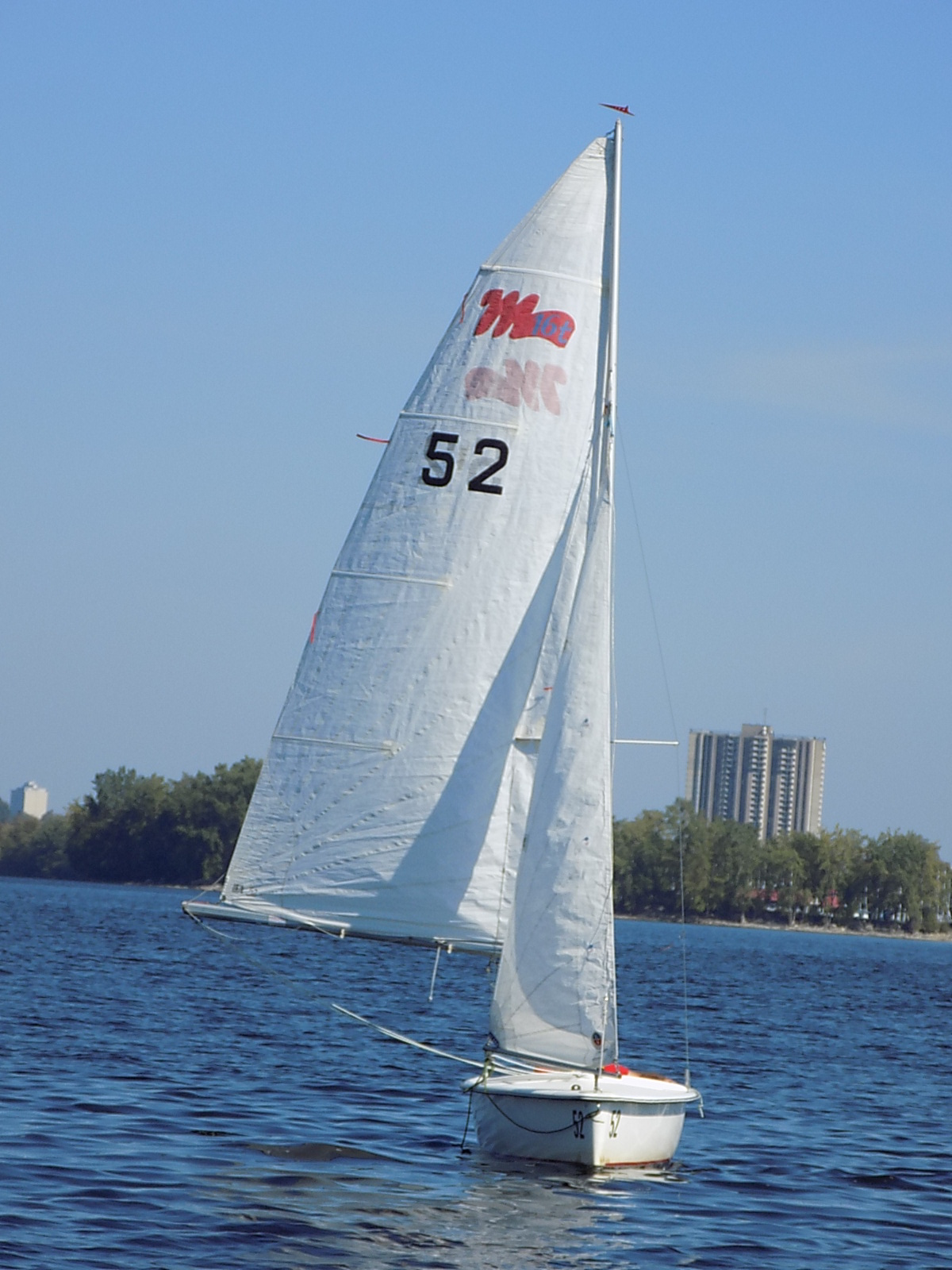
Martin 16

The fiberglass hull has a hull speed of 5.36 kn (9.93 km/h). There is no motor.

It has a fractional sloop rig. Both the mainsail and the jib are mounted with booms. It can fly a spinnaker of 194 sq ft (18.0 m^{2}).

Martin 16 sailors sit on a seat facing forward and all controls and lines are led to the cockpit to allow sailing without having to leave the seat. The rudder is controlled with a joystick. There is a second seat aft for a passenger or instructor.

It has a lifting bulb keel and carries 330 lb (150 kg) of lead ballast. With the keel extended it cannot be tipped. The boat has a draft of 3.33 ft (1.01 m) with the keel extended and 1.33 ft (0.41 m) with it retracted.

== Operational history ==
A fleet of Martin 16s is operated by Nepean Sailing Club in Ottawa, Ontario, Canada and used as the training and racing boat for their Able Sail program for disabled sailors.

A similar fleet of Martin 16s has been used by Challenged Sailors San Diego from Harbor Island for their disabled sailor programming.
