= Nordica 16 =

1970s Canadian sailboat

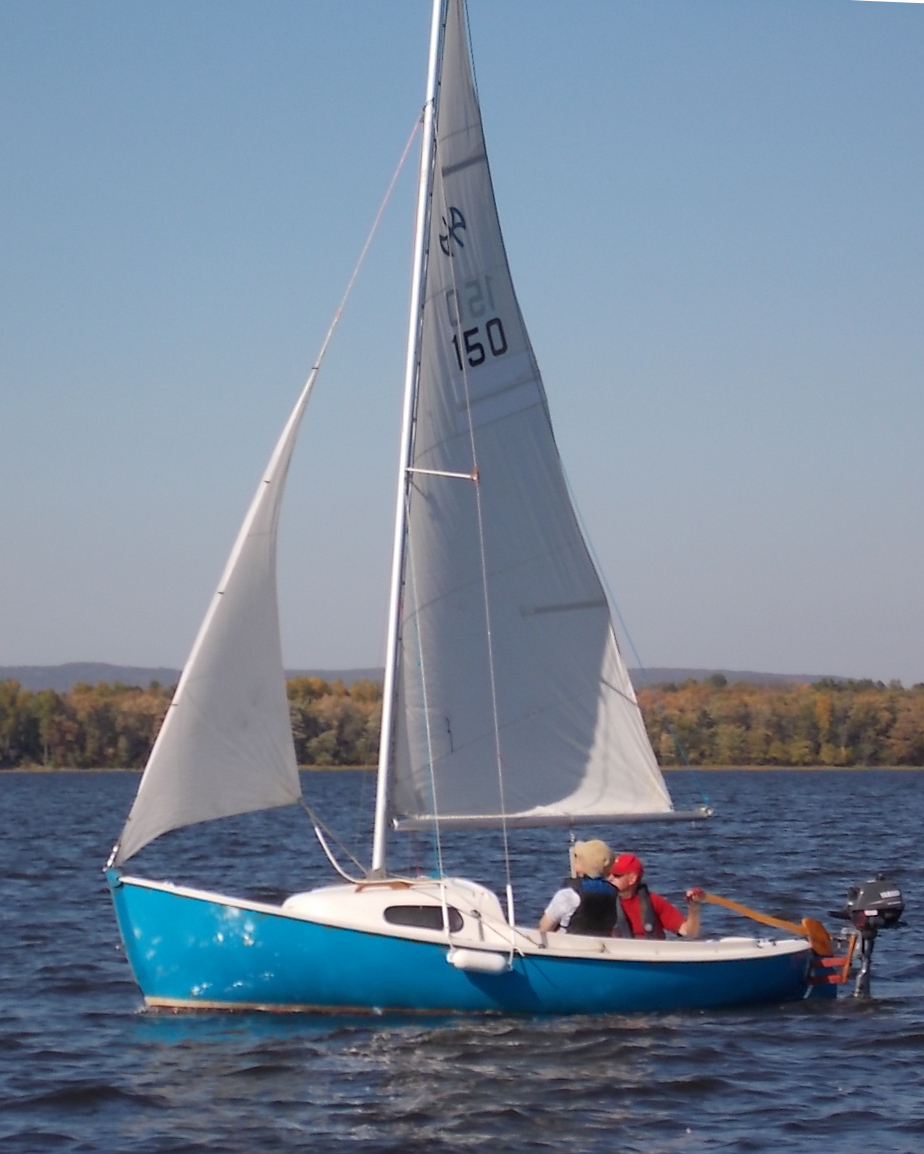

Development
- Designer: Ole Jensen
- Location: Canada
- Year: 1975
- No. built: 400
- Builder: Exe Fibercraft
- Name: Nordica 16

Boat
- Displacement: 925 lb (420 kg)
- Draft: 1.83 ft (0.56 m)

Hull
- Type: Monohull
- Construction: Fiberglass
- LOA: 16.00 ft (4.88 m)
- LWL: 14.00 ft (4.27 m)
- Beam: 6.17 ft (1.88 m)
- Engine: Outboard motor

Hull appendages
- Keel: long keel
- Ballast: 430 lb (195 kg)
- Rudder: transom-mounted rudder

Rig
- General: Fractional rigged sloop
- I foretriangle height: 15.50 ft (4.72 m)
- J foretriangle base: 5.50 ft (1.68 m)
- P mainsail luff: 18.00 ft (5.49 m)
- E mainsail foot: 8.33 ft (2.54 m)

Sails
- Mainsail area: 74.97 sq ft (6.965 m^{2})
- Jib/genoa area: 42.63 sq ft (3.960 m^{2})
- Total sail area: 117.60 sq ft (10.925 m^{2})

Racing
- PHRF: 390 (average)

The Nordica 16 is a sailboat based on the Lynaes 14, a 1820 design by Swede Ole Jensen. The boat was built by Exe Fibercraft in Canada starting in 1975, with 400 examples completed, but it is now out of production.

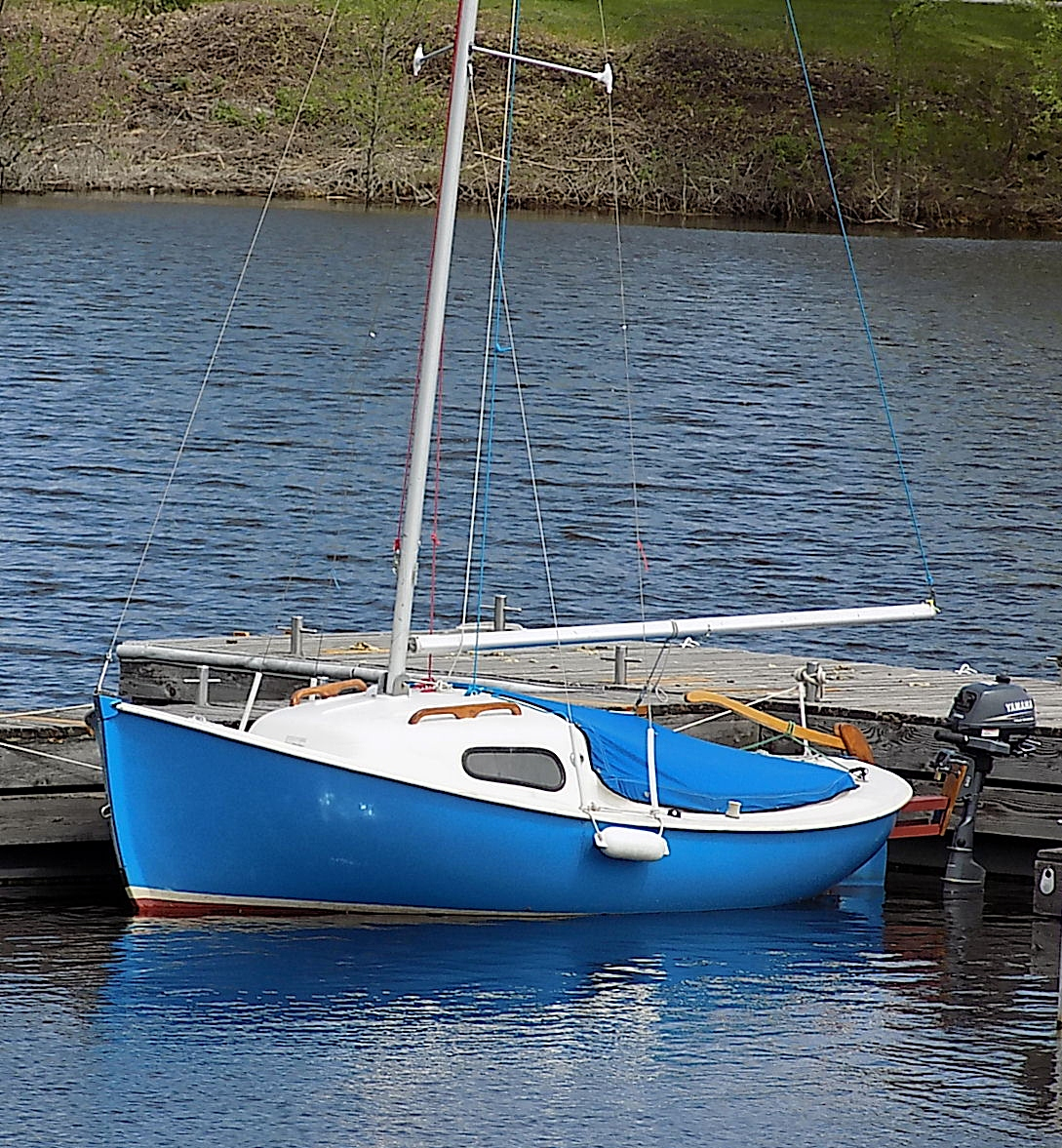
Nordica 16

It is built predominantly of fiberglass, with wood trim. It has a fractional sloop rig, a transom-hung rudder and a fixed long keel. It displaces 925 lb (420 kg) and carries 430 lb (195 kg) of ballast.

The boat has a draft of 1.83 ft (0.56 m) with the standard full-length keel.

The boat is normally fitted with a small outboard motor for docking and maneuvering.

The boat has a PHRF racing average handicap of 390. It has a hull speed of 5.01 kn (9.28 km/h; 5.77 mph).
