= Alfred Blake =

Sir Alfred Blake KCVO MC DL
- Born: 6 October 1915; Gosport, Hampshire, England
- Died: 17 November 2013 (aged 98); Port Royal, South Carolina, U.S.
- Education: University of London
- Occupation: Solicitor
- Years active: 1948–1999
- Known for: Director of the Duke of Edinburgh's Award Scheme
- Awards: Knight Commander of the Royal Victorian Order; Military Cross
- Military career
- Allegiance: United Kingdom
- Branch: Royal Marines
- Service years: 1939–1946
- Rank: Lieutenant colonel

Sir Alfred Lapthorn Blake, KCVO, MC, DL (6 October 1915 – 17 November 2013) was a British solicitor, Royal Marines officer and councillor. He was Lord Mayor of Portsmouth City Council from 1958 to 1959 and director of the Duke of Edinburgh's Award Scheme from 1966 to 1978.

== Early life ==
Blake was born on 6 October 1915 in Gosport, Hampshire, England. He was educated from 1926 to 1932 at Dauntsey's School, a private school in Wiltshire. He read law at the University of London, graduating Bachelor of Laws (LLB) in June 1938. He qualified as a solicitor in 1938.

== Military service ==
On the outbreak of World War II, Blake volunteered for military service. He was one of the first 14 civilians to be commissioned into the Royal Marines during the war. He attended and passed the Army Staff Course at Staff College, Camberley. In 1943, he was posted to Italy as brigade major to Brigadier Tom Churchill of the 2nd Special Service Brigade. He relinquished the rank of acting temporary major on 5 October 1943. He took part in the Allied landings at Anzio in January 1944. On 17 January 1944, he was once more made an acting temporary major. He landed in Albania and was involved in the capture of Sarandë on 9 October 1944, and the liberation of Corfu on 14 October 1944.

In December 1944, he was appointed second-in-command of 45 Commando based in the Netherlands. In January 1945, his unit came under heavy attack from Germans holding the Montforterbeek Canal. In March 1945, his commanding officer was wounded. On 23 March, he was made acting temporary lieutenant colonel, and took over command of 45 Commando. He led them over the Maas, Rhine, Weser, Aller and Elb rivers. In April 1945, he returned to the United Kingdom to command the Commando holding unit at Wrexham, North Wales. He was made acting temporary lieutenant colonel again on 4 September 1945.

Blake was demobilised in February 1946.

== Career ==
Upon returning to civilian life, Blake was involved in creating the Royal Marines Association. It supports past and present Marines and their families. In 1948, he joined Blake Lapthorn, a Portsmouth law firm founded by his grandfather in 1869. He became a partner in 1949. He retired from the firm as Senior Partner in 1985 but continued as a consultant until 1999.

Blake was an elected councillor of Portsmouth City Council. He served as chairman of the Education Committee. He was Lord Mayor of Portsmouth from 1958 to 1959.

Outside of his main career he gave his time to a number of activities. From 1 January 1966 to 30 June 1978, he was the director of the Duke of Edinburgh's Award Scheme. He was a school governor of Portsmouth Girls' High School, where he rose to be chair, and Dauntsey's School. He was an active member of the Rotary Club, marking his sixtieth year of involvement in 2009.

Blake died in Port Royal, South Carolina on 17 November 2013, at the age of 98.

== Honours and decorations ==
In June 1945, Black was awarded the Military Cross (MC) "for courage, tenacity, and skill whilst serving with the Allied Armies in the Mediterranean". He was appointed Commander of the Royal Victorian Order (CVO) in 1975 and promoted to Knight Commander of the Royal Victorian Order (KCVO) in 1979 for his services to the Duke of Edinburgh Award Scheme. In 1991, he was appointed Deputy Lieutenant (DL) of Hampshire.

In 2003, he was made a Freeman of the City of Portsmouth.

Non-profit organization positions
Preceded by Sir John Hunt	Director of the Duke of Edinburgh's Award Scheme; 1966–1978	Succeeded by
