= Lutine =

Lutine may refer to:

- HMS Lutine, a frigate of the Royal Navy, formerly of the French navy
  - HMS Lutine's bell (Lutine Bell) preserved at Lloyd's of London
- Yacht Lutine, various yachts of the Lloyd's of London Yacht Club
- Lutine, a female imp in French folklore, variation of "Lutin"
- Lutein, a carotenoid
