= List of vessels of Royal Navy Coastal Forces =

Coastal Forces of the Royal Navy operated Motor Launches (ML), Motor Torpedo Boats (MTB) and Motor Gun Boats (MGB) during Second World War and after.

The vessels were made by several manufactures and the designs varied.

MTBs were intended for attacking enemy shipping while MGBs were armed for combat with other fast attack craft. Motor Launches were used for harbour defence and anti-submarine operations.

== Motor Torpedo Boats ==
List of MTBs
Vessel	Type	Builder	In service	Notes
MTB 1	60ft BPB	British Power Boat Company (BPB)	June 1936	
MTB 2	60ft BPB	British Power Boat Company (BPB)	June 1936	
MTB 3	60ft BPB	British Power Boat Company (BPB)		
MTB 4	60ft BPB	British Power Boat Company (BPB)		
MTB 5	60ft BPB	British Power Boat Company (BPB)		
MTB 6	60ft BPB	British Power Boat Company (BPB)		
MTB 7 - MTB 12	60ft BPB			Lost in December 1941 during Japanese attack on Hong Kong
MTB 13				Pennant not used
MTB 14	60ft BPB	BPB		
MTB 15	60ft BPB			
MTB 16	60ft BPB			hit mine and sank in the Thames estuary, 31 October 1940
MTB 17	60ft BPB			hit mine and sank off Oostende, Belgium, 21 October 1940
MTB 18	60ft BPB			
MTB 19	60ft BPB			
MTB 20	70ft	Vosper		To Romanian Navy
MTB 21	70ft	Vosper		To Romanian Navy
MTB 22	70ft	Vosper		RN
MTB 23	70ft	Vosper		To Romania
MTB 24, MTB 25	74ft	Thornycroft		Prototypes for 75ft design
MTB 26	55 ft CMB	Thornycroft	October 1939	From order for China. MTB 26 sunk December 1941 MTB 27 was scuttled in December 1941 during the Japanese attack on Hong Kong
MTB 27	55 ft CMB	Thornycroft	October 1939	From order for China. MTB 26 sunk December 1941 MTB 27 was scuttled in December 1941 during the Japanese attack on Hong Kong
MTB 28,	70 ft	Vosper (sub contracted to Thornycroft)	July 1940	Replacements for MTBs 20, 21, and 23. MTB 28 burned out 7 March 1941 MTB 29 sank after colliding with a German MTB, 6 October 1942. MTB 30 lost to mine in North Sea, December 1942
MTB 29, 30	70 ft	Vosper (sub contracted to Camper and Nicholsons)	June 1940 July 1940	Replacements for MTBs 20, 21, and 23. MTB 28 burned out 7 March 1941 MTB 29 sank after colliding with a German MTB, 6 October 1942. MTB 30 lost to mine in North Sea, December 1942
MTB 31-40	70ft	Vosper	From September 1940	changed to Hall Scott Defender engines from No. 35 onwards. MTB 33, 37, 39 and 40 were lost to a bombing raid during construction, January 1941. MTB 35 out of service in 1943MTB 32 became a target boat ("Controlled Target) CT 24 in 1942 MTB 31 and MTB 34 were converted to CT 22 and CT 23 in 1943
MTB 41-48	Vosper 72ft	J S White	From September 1940	
MTB 49 -56	75ft	Thornycroft		
MTB 57-66		Vosper		ordered 26 February 1940.
MTB 67-68		Vosper		
MTB 69-70	70 ft	Vosper		Intended for Greek Navy (as T3 and T4). Two engines instead of three limited top speed to 27 knots
MTB 71-72	60ft	Vosper		originally built for Norway (as No.7 and No.8)
MTB 73-99	72ft 6 in (Note: Fitted with Type 286 radar in 1941. 20mm Oerlikon mounted ahead of the bridge late in the war.)	Vosper	delivered January 1941 to January 1942	Ordered 14 May 1940. Construction subcontracted to various yards. Packard engines. Six supplied to Free French forcesMTB 74 Special modification, 70 ft long with torpedo tubes on fo'castle. to fire over anti-torpedo nets. Used in St Nazaire raid MTB 75 destroyed in German bombing raid while being built MTB 90, 91, 92, 94, 96, and 98 trasnferred to Free French in 1942
MTB 102	68ft	Vosper	Built 1936-37	Private venture with Isotta Fraschini engines, designed by Peter du Cane. Acted as flagship during Dunkirk evacuation (Operation Dynamo). Preserved since 1995.
MTB 103				experimental 70ft, used as target tow
MTB 108	MTB 'small type'			Destroyed by bombing before complete
MTB 201-212		J. Samuel White		Built to Vosper design
MTB 218-221	70ft Vosper	Vosper		Ordered for Greek Navy in 1940. Requestioned be UK in 1941 Same design as MTBs 69-70 MTB 218 sunk by mine and "German surface craft" in the Dover Strait 18 August 1942.
MTB 222-245	72ft 6 in	Vosper		Similar to MTB 73 series but with 20mm cannon added. Two to Free French and two to Royal Netherlands Navy MTB 242 to 245 built by J Samuel White as replacements for MTBs 33, 37, 39, and 40
MTB 246-257	73ft White			Vosper design. MTB 248 lost following collision June 1944
MTB 258				
MTB 259-268	70ft Elco	Elco	1941	Supplied under Lend-lease. Armed with two 21-inch torpedo tubes Formerly USN PT-10 to 19
MTB 275-282		Vosper design built by Annapolis Yacht Yard in USA		Lend-Lease production
MTB 307-316	77ft Elco			
347 - 362	70ft	Vosper		ordered April 1942
MTB 363-370	72ft 6in Vosper	Vosper built by Annapolis Yacht Yard		Transferred to USSR
MTB 371-378	72ft 6in Vosper	Vosper built by Annapolis Yacht Yard		British use
MTB 379				70ft scale test of 73 ft design for MTB/MGB
MTB 380-395	73ft Vosper Type 1	Vosper		73ft Type 1 Four 18-inch torpedo tubes
MTB 396-411	72ft 6in Vosper			
MTB 412-418	72ft BPB	BPB		Initially MGB 74-81
MTB 419-423	78ft Higgins			
MTB 424-429	73ft White			
MTB 430-500	BPB 72 ft			Former MGBs 436,437 and 453 transferred to RCN
MTB 501-509	Camper & Nicholson 117 ft MTB/MGB		February 1941	
MTB 510	Vosper 100ft		December 1943	Experimental 100 ft design to test gearbox, not used in combat
MTB 511-518	Camper & Nicholson 117 ft MTB/MGB		"Summer" 1944	
MTB 519- 522				Pennant numbers assigned but not used.
MTB 523-527	73ft Vosper Type 2		post war	73ft Type II with heavier gun armament (additional 6-pounder (57mm) gun and 20 mm cannon) than the Type 1. Carried two 21-inch torpedo tubes
MTB 528-530	73ft Vosper Type 2			
MTB 532-533	73ft Vosper Type 2			

== Motor Gun Boats ==
List of MGBs
Vessel	Type	Builder	Entered service	Notes
MGB 1-39	60ft and, 70ft	BPB		converted from MA/SBs in 1940. MGB 1, 2, 4, 5, 22-39 converted to Air Sea Rescue launches in 1941-42.
MGB 40-45	60ft	BPB		Dutch navy MTBs converted. MGB 44 and 45 transferred to Polish Navy in 1944
MGB 46	70ft	BPB		
MGB 47, 48	75ft	White		
MGB 49	60ft	White		
MGB 50-67				
MGB 68	81ft	Higgins	April 1941	Formerly USN PT-6
MGB 69-73	70ft	Higgins	June 1940	built for Finland but transferred to UK instead
MGB 74-81				
MGB 82-93	70ft	Elco	1941	USN PTC 1-12 supplied under lend lease from US. Fitted with 20mm Oerlikon and two twin 0.5-inch Vickers heavy machine guns in British service.
MGB 98-99	65ft 7in AC de Loire			Built for France as VTB-11 and 12. Requisitioned
MGB 100-106	70ft	Higgins		built for Finland but transferred to UK instead
MGB 177-192	78ft	Higgins		built for USN but transferred to UK instead
MGB 312–335	Fairmile C	Fairmile Marine	1941 onwards	110 ft design
MGB 336-500	not used			
MGB 501	110ft	Camper and Nicholson	1942	prototype for 502-509 and 511-518
MGB 502 to 509	117 ft	Camper and Nicholson	1941	Under construction for Turkey. Taken over in 1941 503 and 503 completed as MGBs. Five converted (three by Camper and Nicholson and two by Amos and Smith, Hull) to blockade runners to transport ball bearings from Sweden, 504 became Hopewell, 505 became Nonsuch, 506 became Gay Viking, 507 became Gay Corsair and 508 became Master Standfast. Gay Corsair converted back to MGB 507 then renamed HMGB 2007. 509 later MGB 2009 converted post war as gas turbine experiment.
MGB 510	73ft	Vosper	1943	Experimental MGB based on 73ft Vosper Mtb
MGB 511-518	117 ft	Camper and Nicholson	1944	dual MTB/MGB design
MGB 519-600	designation not used			
MGB 601-800	Fairmile D		1942-1945	
MGB 801-2000	designation not used			
MGB 2001	Fairmile F	Fairmile	1943	Single prototype
MGB 2002-5000	designation not used			
MGB 5001-5029	Fairmile D		1944-1945	dual MTB/MGB configuration

== Steam Gun Boat ==
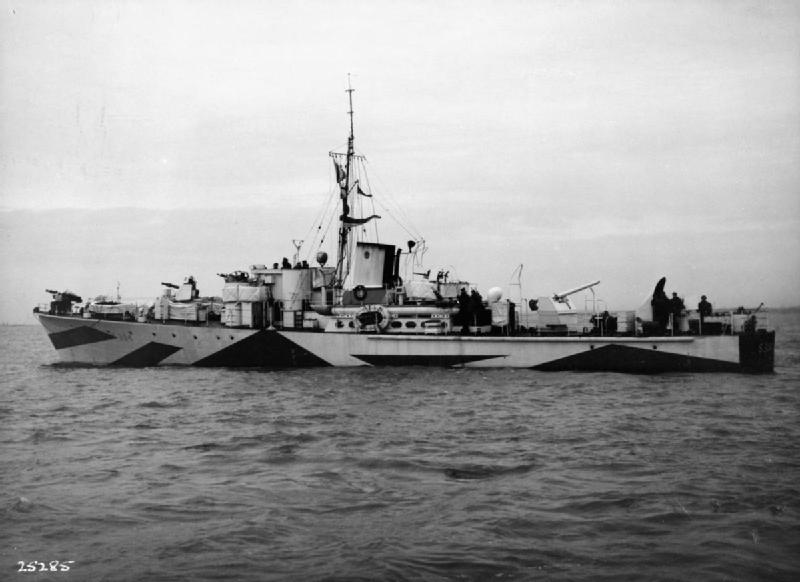
SGB4, later named Grey Fox, was one of the seven Steam Gun Boats completed

The Steam Gun Boats were a class of nine high speed 145 ft (44 m) vessels intended to combine the functions of an MTB and an MGB comparable to a German "E-boat". They were powered by steam turbine engines due to lack of suitable internal combustion engines. Only seven of the nine ordered out of a planned 52 boats were completed.

Operated as a single flotilla in the Channel, SGB7 was lost in the 1942 Dieppe Raid The five remaining were converted to minesweepers in 1944.

Vessel	Builder	In service	Notes
SGB 1 & 2	Thornycroft	Cancelled	Construction stopped after damaged in air raid
SGB 3 to 9	Thornycroft, Yarrow, Hawthorne Leslie, Denny, J Samuel White	1941 onwards.	Later given names starting with 'Grey'
