= Operation Corkscrew =

Military operation

- Part of the Battle of the Mediterranean and the Italian campaign of World War II
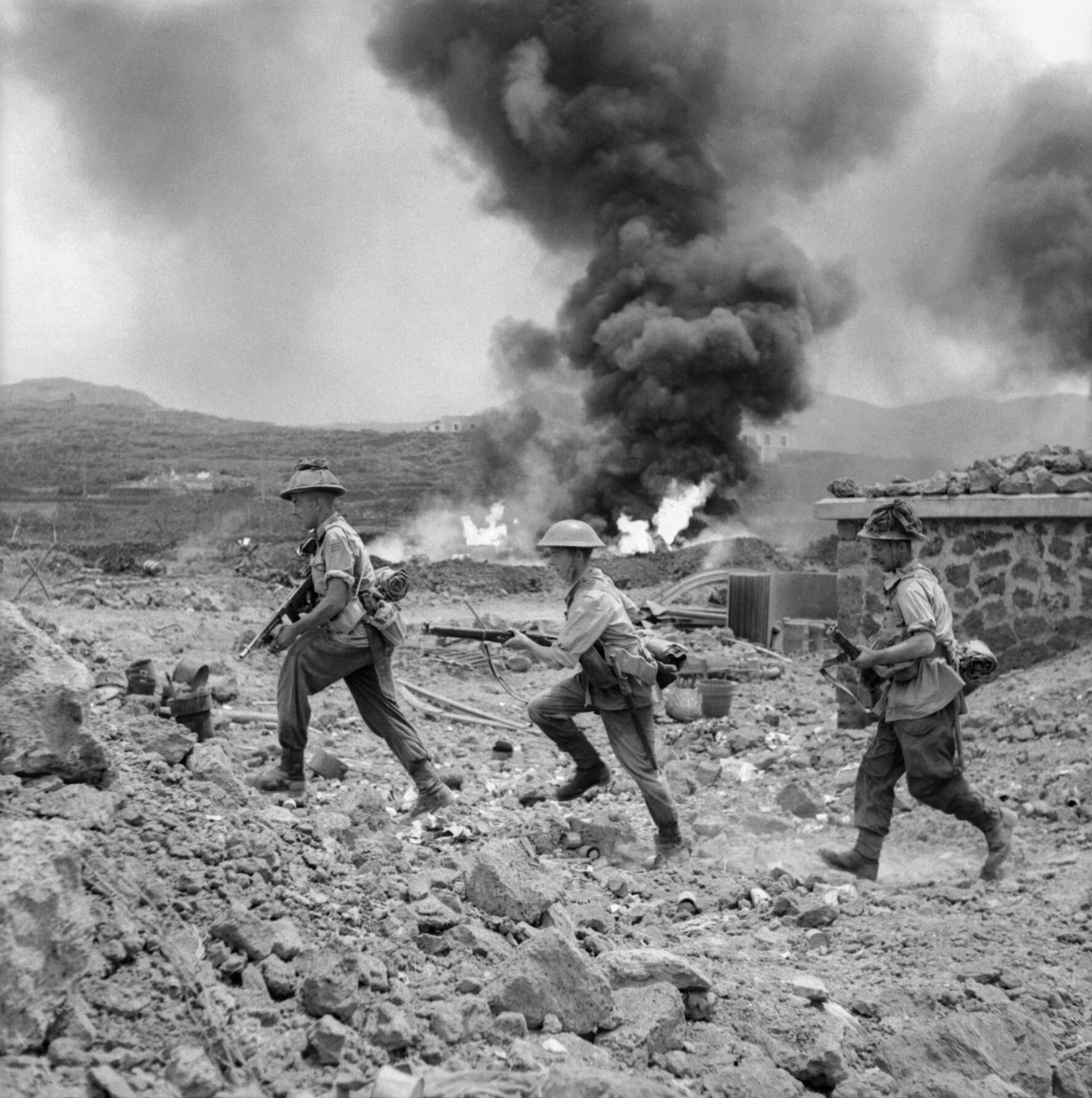
- Men of the 1st Battalion, Duke of Wellington's Regiment, part of the 3rd Infantry Brigade of the 1st Division, advancing inland during Operation Corkscrew.
Date	11 June 1943
Location	Pantelleria island 36°47′15″N 11°59′33″E
Result	Allied victory
Territorial changes	Allied occupation of the islands

Belligerents
United Kingdom	Italy

Commanders and leaders
Walter Clutterbuck	Gino Pavesi (surrendered)

Strength
14,000	11,420

Casualties and losses
15 aircraft shot down	40 killed 150 wounded 11,000 prisoners

Operation Corkscrew was the code name for the Allied invasion of the Italian island of Pantelleria (between Sicily and Tunisia) on 11 June 1943, prior to the Allied invasion of Sicily, during the Second World War. General Dwight D. Eisenhower, Supreme Commander Allied Expeditionary Force of the North African Theater of Operations gave orders for the Allied air forces to conduct an aerial offensive against the island defences, followed, if necessary, by an invasion.

Bombing began in May and on 6 June the tempo increased and from mid-May, 6,400 long tons (6,500 t) of bombs were dropped in 5,218 sorties by bombers and fighter-bombers, the main area attacked being 8 sq mi (21 km^{2}). An Italian airlift began in June from Sicily by Savoia-Marchetti SM.82 transport aircraft delivered supplies at night. An acute water shortage developed on the island and an offer to surrender was broadcast on 11 June as an Allied invasion force waited offshore. Elements of the British 1st Infantry Division landed unopposed but faced sporadic resistance from Italian troops who had not received the order to surrender.

Advocates of air power claimed that the surrender vindicated the theories of air power developed between the wars but analysis of the ruins of the island defences soon led to the more extravagant claims of destruction being discredited and that the bombing had been more effective on the morale of the defenders. Some Royal Air Force officers, like Arthur Tedder, head of the Mediterranean Air Command, became concerned that the army might demand that the RAF repeat the feat as a matter of routine.

== Background ==
=== Pantelleria ===
On the direct route from Tunisia to Sicily, Pantelleria is an island 70 mi (110 km) south-west of Sicily and 150 mi (240 km) north-west of Malta and part of the Pelagian Islands. In 1937, the Italian Prime Minister, Benito Mussolini, had work on fortifications begun to make Pantelleria a strategic equivalent of Malta. Work was started but the entry into the war delayed and in some cases halted it. The main construction was the excavation of two underground hangars 1,115 ft × 85 ft (340 m × 26 m) known as Nervi and Bartoli that were finished in 1939 for fighter aircraft and Mangana airfield. There was a large underground ammunition dump was also but ammunition had to be transported to artillery batteries along roads in the open.

=== Civilians ===
There was a population of over 10,000 civilians, that lacked shelter and food was sufficient for only twenty to fifty days. Food was running short and no supplies had arrived since January. Supermarina proposed in March that the civilian population be evacuated but the Ministry of the Interior rejected this on grounds of public morale, especially in Sicily. Water came from three wells with electric pumps but in 1943 the power station was incomplete. Civilians used rain water run-off from the roofs but when army reinforcements arrived, water use doubled and had to be brought from Sicily in tankers (muli del mare).

The three wells were blocked at the start of the bombing campaign, leaving a few reserve water tanks around the island. Fauno returning from the island on the night of 29/30 April was sunk by two destroyers. Aircraft ferried small amounts of supplies and the Regia Marina sent Arno a tanker, from Trapani to run the blockade. on its second voyage, Arno carried a water purification and distilling plant. After trying to unload the machinery for three days and three nights in the ruins of the harbour amidst the bombing, Arno managed to evade the blockading ship and get back to Sicily.

=== Fortifications ===
The island had a garrison of 11,420 men of the Brigata Mista Pantelleria (Mixed Brigade Pantelleria), part of the 6th Army (Generale Alfredo Guzzoni). The island had been intended to have three coastal batteries with 12 × 152 mm guns each, three batteries with 13 × 120 mm guns each and two with 12 × modern 90 mm guns and 14 batteries of anti-aircraft guns with 76 × 76 mm guns. (Note: In 1957, Bragadin wrote that fortress Pantelleria had seven coastal and fifteen anti-aircraft batteries with obsolete weapons and that around November 1942, concern that the Sicilian Channel might be lost led to attempts to improve the defences but that little was done.) The excavation of caves and protected positions for the artillery had been postponed due to the cost and in 1943 were still in the open. It is not certain that all this artillery, especially the 90 mm guns, were in position.

The Germans had installed three air radar sets and one sea search radar but these had been dismantled and evacuated with the 1,000 German troops at the end of May, further depressing morale. The coastal cliffs had numerous caves from which torpedo boats and submarines could operate and left only the Porto di Pantelleria in the north-west of the island as a feasible landing site, despite its fortifications, that were an unwelcome reminder to the British of the Dieppe Raid disaster of 19 August 1942.

=== Allied plan ===
Operation Workshop was an abortive Allied plan to occupy Pantelleria in late 1940 that was cancelled when the commander of Force H at Gibraltar opposed the idea and because Fliegerkorps X had arrived in Sicily. Not until 1943 could the Allies contemplate another offensive operation. General Dwight D. Eisenhower, Supreme Commander Allied Expeditionary Force of the North African Theater of Operations gave orders that the Allied air forces would undertake an aerial offensive against the island defences, followed by an invasion.

== Bombardments ==
=== Air campaign ===
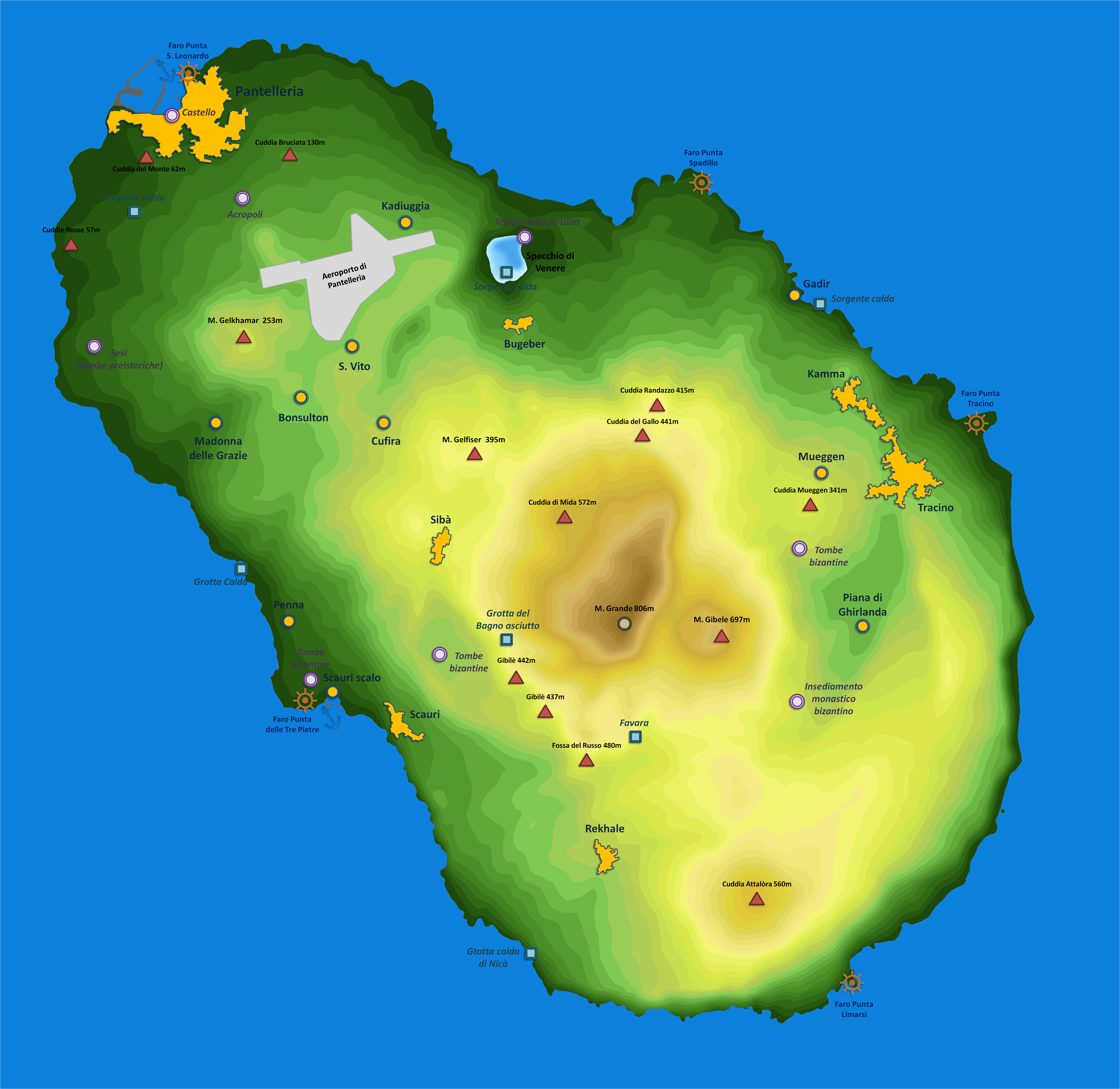
Map of Pantelleria, airfield and port to the north-west

On 8 May, the island was attacked by 122 British and South African Bostons and Baltimore bombers of the Northwest African Air Forces and B-25s of the US 9th Army Air Force. On 9 May another 121 bombers attacked and there were two raids on 10 May, to prevent the Axis using the island for the evacuation of Tunisia. The bombers returned on 18 May and from 29 May bombers dropped flares, illuminating the island at night, making it impossible for repairs to be made. Many of the defence positions became isolated and received no more ammunition, food or water. Keeping alert for twenty-four hours a day, drained the defenders' will and ability to resist. Civilians, mostly women and children took refuge in the only safe places, underground ammunition dumps of the gun batteries and in other underground military installations. Such living conditions, with people crowded together, short of water and food, were squalid. The proximity of the garrison to the civilians added to the pressure on their morale.

From 6 June the tempo increased, the squadrons of the Northwest African Strategic Air Force, Northwest African Tactical Air Force and the XII Air Support Command attacking. On 5 June, the 15th US PT Boat Squadron circumnavigated the island to assess the condition of the defences and watch the raids. From 1 to 10 June about 5,000 long tons (5,100 t) of bombs were dropped by heavy, medium, light bombers and fighter-bombers. On 10 June, the anniversary of the Italian declaration of war, about 1,400 long tons (1,400 t) of bombs were dropped on the island. The bombing campaign was concentrated on Porto di Pantellaria and Margana airfield at first and a considerable number of aircraft were claimed destroyed on the ground. From the middle of May, 6,400 long tons (6,500 t) of bombs were dropped in 5,218 sorties by bombers and fighter-bombers, the main area attacked being 8 sq mi (21 km^{2}). In June an airlift from Sicily by Savoia-Marchetti SM.82 transport aircraft delivered supplies at night.

=== Naval operations ===
Italian MAS boats and German S-boote challenged the Allied blockade but despite many patrols, there were no engagements with Allied ships. The cruiser HMS Orion bombarded the island on the night of 12/13 May and again on 31 May with the destroyers HMS Troubridge and Petard. On 1 June HMS Penelope with the destroyers HMS Paladin and Petard bombarded the island and was hit by return-fire. On the night of 2/3 June Orion, Paladin and Troubridge bombarded Pantellaria again, then on 3 June, the destroyers HMS Ilex and Isis joined in. On 5 June, HMS Newfoundland, Paladin and Troubridge bombarded the island and on 8 June, the cruisers HMS Aurora, HMS Euryalus, Newfoundland, Orion, Penelope, the destroyers HMS Jervis, Laforey, Lookout, Loyal, Nubian, Tartar, Troubridge and Whaddon, with MTB 73, MTB 77 and MTB 84 bombarded Porto de Pantellaria. Two demands for the garrison to surrender on 5 and 9 June went unanswered and on the night of 10/11 June, Force B, comprising the HQ ship HMS Largs, Paladin, Petard, HMS Aphis waited offshore, with a covering force of the cruisers Aurora (with Eisenhower and Cunningham aboard) Newfoundland, Orion, Penelope and Euryalus, the destroyers, Laforey, Lookout, Loyal, Jervis, Tartar, Nubian, Troubridge and Whaddon with eight MTBs.

== Invasion ==
Pavesi had been sending Supermarina daily reports and on 2 June his assessment of the situation noted that there was no hope and that capitulation was only a matter of time. On the evening of 10 July only two anti-aircraft batteries were still operational and these were in the mountains in the middle of the island, useless against a landing. Telephone and road communications had been cut and orders were being delivered by runner. The water supply was down to about four days and many isolated units had run out of water with no hope of supply. On the evening of 10 June, Pavesi reported to Supermarina that the ability of the garrison to resist was almost at an end. Comando Supremo gave Pavesi authority to negotiate an end to the siege.

US and British motor torpedo boats provided defensive screens to the north of the island against attacks by Axis aircraft. Force B, invasion convoys from Sfax and Sousse (Rear-Admiral Rhoderick McGrigor) sat offshore with a brigade of the 1st Infantry Division (Major-General Walter Clutterbuck). After dawn on 11 June the bombing increased again and at 9:00 a.m. Pavesi reported to Supermarina that he would ask for terms. His message crossed with one from Mussolini that ordered Pavesi to request surrender "because of the lack of water".

A white flag was raised over the wireless station but it could not be seen amidst clouds of dust raised by the bombing. At 10:00 a.m., Allied landing craft and naval units appeared out of the dust hanging over the sea. The last operational guns fired a few shots at the landing craft, that kept out of range waiting for the bombers to finish. At 11:00 p.m. Pavesi sent a surrender request by wireless, prevented demolitions from taking place and at 11:30 a.m. British troops landed. For a few hours, there was scattered resistance from isolated units that had not received notice of the end of hostilities and it took until the afternoon to stop the air raids.

== Aftermath ==
=== Analysis ===
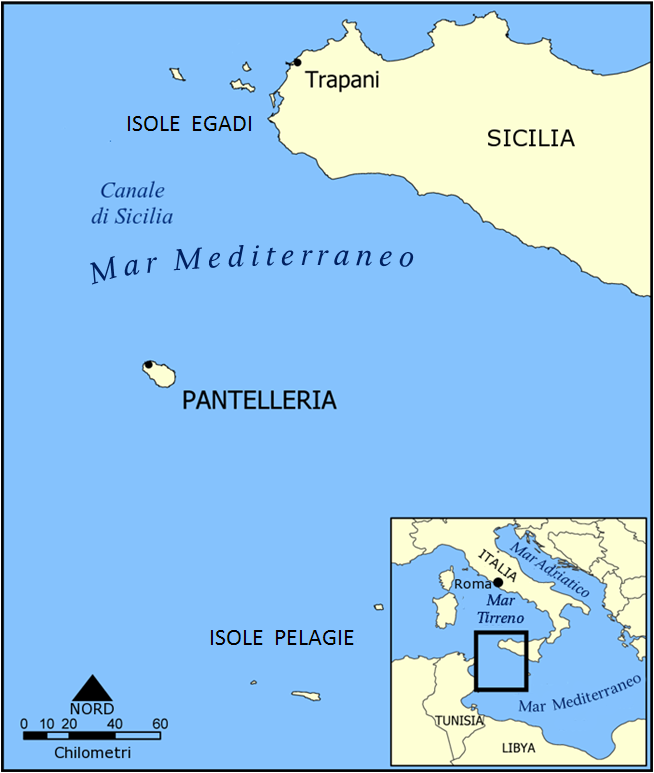
Location map of Pantelleria

A 1947 analysis by Edith Rogers found that the Italian gun positions were reduced to 47 per cent effectiveness by the ten-day air bombardment. Out of 112 guns bombed, 2 had suffered from direct hits, 17 had near misses and 34 were damaged by debris and splinters (10 beyond repair). All control communications were destroyed, along with many gun emplacements and ammunition stores.

Early assumptions of the effect of the bombing were substantially revised by the analysis of Solly Zuckerman the senior scientific adviser at the Air Ministry who, by coincidence, was in the Mediterranean and had experience in the analysis of bombing. Zuckerman found that the weather had been dry and bright, ideal for bombing, yet only 3.3 per cent of the bombs from four-engined bombers fell within 100 yd (91 m) of their targets and the fighter-bombers had been even less accurate. The surface of the island was smashed and the town destroyed but only about 200 casualties were suffered by the garrison; although most of the artillery had to be dug out from the wreckage, nearly all remained operational.

In 2021, Greg Baughen wrote that a third of the bombs dropped fell on 10 June, the day before the invasion, that was accompanied by an air and naval bombardment. The garrison surrendered to the invasion force, in what appeared to be a triumphant vindication of bombing, most being high-altitude attacks by strategic bombers. Air Chief Marshal Sir Arthur Tedder the head of the Mediterranean Air Command wrote that the island defences had been destroyed and that "most of the artillery had been crippled or obliterated". After Zuckerman reported his findings it was certain that the bombing had more effect on the morale of the defenders, this concerned Tedder who saw the result as potentially placing a burden on the RAF that reduced it to the status of army artillery.

=== Casualties ===
According to volume V of the British official history (1973 and 2004) 39 Italian men were killed. The historians Greene and Massignani in 2002 wrote that the Italian garrison suffered 139 casualties. In 2007, Gioannini and Massobrio wrote that the garrison suffered casualties of 40 killed and 150 wounded. In 2014, Bryn Evans wrote that 15 Allied aircraft were shot down.

=== Subsequent operations ===
On 12 June, the island of Lampedusa surrendered after a night bombardment by Aurora, Orion, Penelope and Newfoundland with six destroyers. Linosa surrendered to Nubian on 13 June and Lampione on 14 June. The submarine HMS Ultor bombarded a D/F station on Salina (Aeolian Islands) clearing the way for the Allied invasion of Sicily a month later.

== Bibliography ==
- "Abandoned, Forgotten & little known airfields in Europe". 2010.
- Baughen, Greg (2021). RAF at the Crossroads: The Second Front and the Strategic Bombing Debate 1942−1943. Barnsley: Air World (Pen & Sword). ISBN 978-1-52679-534-2.
- Bragadin, M. (1957) [1948]. Fioravanzo, G. (ed.). The Italian Navy in World War II. Translated by Hoffman, G. (Eng. trans. ed.). Annapolis, Maryland: United States Naval Institute. OCLC 602717421.
- Evans, Bryn (2014). The Decisive Campaigns of the Desert Air Force 1942–1945. Barnsley: Pen & Sword. ISBN 978-1-78-346260-5.
- Chant, Christopher (1986). The Encyclopedia of Codenames of World War II. London: Routledge & Kegan Paul. ISBN 978-0-71-020718-0.
- Gioannini, Marco; Massobrio, Giulio (2007). Bombardate l'Italia. Storia della guerra di distruzione aerea 1940–1945 (in Italian). Rizzoli. ISBN 978-8-81-701585-1.
- Giorgerini, Giorgio (2001). La guerra italiana sul mare. La Marina tra vittoria e sconfitta 1940–1943 [The Italian War at Sea: The Navy between Victory and Defeat 1940–1943]. Collezione Le Scie (in Italian). Milano: Mondadori. ISBN 978-8-80-440581-8.
- Greene, Jack; Massignani, Alessandro (2002) [1998]. The Naval War in the Mediterranean, 1940–1943. Rochester: Chatham. ISBN 978-1-86176-057-9.
- Molony, C. J. C.; Flynn, F. C.; Davies, H. L.; Gleave, T. P. (2004) [1973]. The Mediterranean and Middle East: The Campaign in Sicily 1943 and The Campaign in Italy, 3rd September 1943 to 31st March 1944 (Part I). History of the Second World War, United Kingdom, Military Series. Vol. V (Facs. pbk. Naval & Military Press, Uckfield ed.). London: HMSO. ISBN 978-1-84574-069-6.
- Playfair, I. S. O.; et al. (1957) [1954]. Butler, J. R. M. (ed.). The Mediterranean and Middle East: The Early Successes Against Italy (to May 1941). History of the Second World War, United Kingdom Military Series. Vol. I (4th ed.). HMSO. OCLC 494123451.
- Playfair, I. S. O.; et al. (2004) [1966]. Butler, J. R. M. (ed.). The Mediterranean and Middle East: The Destruction of the Axis Forces in Africa. History of the Second World War United Kingdom Military Series. Vol. IV (pbk. facs. repr. Naval & Military Press, Uckfield ed.). London: HMSO. ISBN 978-1-84574-068-9.
- Richards, Denis; Saunders, H. St G. (1975) [1954]. Royal Air Force 1939–1945: The Fight Avails. Vol. II (pbk. repr. ed.). London: HMSO. ISBN 978-0-11-771593-6.
- Rogers, Anthony (2003). Churchill's Folly Leros and the Aegean: The Last Great British Defeat of World War Two. London: Cassell. ISBN 0-304-36151-8.
- Rogers, Edith C. (1947). The Reduction of Pantelleria and Adjacent Islands, 8 May – 14 June 1943 (PDF) (Report). monograph 52. Air Force Historical Research Agency USAF.
- Rohwer, Jürgen; Hümmelchen, Gerhard (2005) [1972]. Chronology of the War at Sea, 1939–1945: The Naval History of World War Two (3rd rev. ed.). London: Chatham. ISBN 978-1-86176-257-3.
- Shores, Christopher; Massimello, Giovanni (2018). A History of the Mediterranean Air War 1940–1945: Sicily and Italy to the Fall of Rome, 14 May 1943 – 5 June 1944. London: Grub Street. ISBN 978-1-91-162178-2.
- Smith, Peter C. (2011). Critical Conflict: The Royal Navy's Mediterranean Campaign in 1940. Barnsley: Pen & Sword Aviation. ISBN 978-1-84884-513-8. First published as Action Imminent: Three Studies of the Naval War in the Mediterranean Theatre during 1940 (1980) William Kimber, London. ISBN 978-0-7183-0277-1
