= Camper and Nicholsons =

Former British yacht builders

Camper and Nicholson is a yacht design and manufacturing company based in Gosport, England, for over two hundred years, constructing many significant vessels, such as Gipsy Moth IV and Prince Philip's yacht Bloodhound. Its customers included Thomas Sopwith, William Kissam Vanderbilt II and George Spencer-Churchill, 6th Duke of Marlborough. Its yachts competed in The America's Cup, The Fastnet Race, the Olympics, the Ocean Race (Whitbread Round the World Race) and many other yacht races. It also built a number of small warships (for the British Admiralty as well as overseas buyers), notably during the two World Wars, and some as late as the 1950s.

== History ==
=== Origin ===
In 1782 Francis Calense Amos, who had trained as a shipwright in London, founded a shipyard in Gosport, leasing the land from the Royal Naval Dockyard. Initially he built and repaired small boats for local fishermen. In 1809 he took on his great-nephew, William Camper as his apprentice, and in 1824 William took over running the business, inheriting it when Amos died in March 1824.

=== Camper and Nicholson ===
Benjamin Nicholson joined the company as an apprentice in 1842 and by 1855 had taken over much of the design work. The company was renamed to Camper and Nicholson to reflect his contribution. Benjamin's son, Charles Ernest Nicholson, followed in his father's footsteps as a yacht designer. In 1875 the business was registered as a limited company, under the name 'Camper and Nicholsons', reflecting the roles of Benjamin's sons Ben Jr and Charles as directors.

In December 1910 there was a major fire at the Gosport Shipyard, depicted in a painting by William Lionel Wyllie and held in the collection of the National Maritime Museum. This destroyed the offices, including almost all the existing records, and spread to, and destroyed the joiners shop on Quay Lane. Recovery from the fire took until around 1912.

=== Purchase of J.G. Fay & Co. and Southampton yard ===
In December 1912 Camper and Nicholson acquired J.G. Fay & Co., a yacht building and maintenance firm with a shipyard at Northam in Southampton. The larger slipway and other facilities allowed larger boats to be built. Some time after the launch of Shamrock IV in 1914, when the firm was still called 'Camper and Nicholson', the firm was renamed to Camper and Nicholsons, to reflect Ben's sons joining the firm.

=== World War I ===
At the outbreak of the war there was need for conversion of civilian vessels for wartime use, for example converting the 493 ton steam yacht Grianaig, belonging to Lord Dunraven, into a hospital ship, which the 76 year old peer commanded himself, evacuating wounded from France and Gallipoli.

The yard made small naval craft for the Admiralty.

They also built Flying Boats for the Gosport Aircraft Company, hulls being built at Gosport and towed to Northam. Yard numbers 234-238 were F 2 A Flying Boat Hulls,249-264 were F3 Flying Boat Hulls

=== World War II ===
At the start of the war most of the larger Camper and Nicholson built boats were requisitioned by the Admiralty, and served in a variety of roles, generally being refitted at the Northam Yard before entering active service. Despite both yards being bombed several times they continued to build, refit and repair throughout the war.

In 1941 the 'Bounty Class' Motor Yachts Bounty and Llanthony were part of the Dunkirk Evacuation.

Camper and Nicholson were building Motor Gun Boats for Turkey but these were taken over for British use as MGB 502 to MGB 509 in 1941 Five were converted to blockade runners to bring ball bearings out of neutral Sweden. MGB 506 became Gay Viking, and MGB 507 Gay Corsair, .

They also built Motor torpedo boats This included MTB numbers 28 to 30 under subcontract to Vospers.

They converted the passenger steamers PS Southsea and PS Ryde, which had operated at Southern Railway ferries, into minesweepers in February 1940,

As part of the preparation for the Normandy landings the firm designed and built 24 SLUG (Surf Landing Under Girder) boats, for use in the Mulberry harbour. These deployed a 'Kite Anchor' at one side of the floating bridge, and then passed under it (hence the name) to deploy another anchor on the far side. All 24 had Yard Number 678. They also built 10 'Compressor Boats' (Yard Number 680).

They also built large quantities of various types of Landing Craft. They built 96 Landing Craft Assault which were used in the 1943 Allied Landings in North Africa and Europe, and 36 Landing Craft Support (Medium).

=== Postwar activities ===
The firm resumed civilian boat building, and yacht maintenance, while continuing to build Minesweepers and other small Naval craft.

The centre of yachting activity was moving to the Mediterranean, and in 1961 Camper & Nicholsons formed a subsidiary - Camper and Nicholsons International to have a presence in the area.

The shipyard started to build yachts with GRP hulls, with the first Nicholson 36 being built in 1961.

=== Camper and Nicholsons International ===
Formed as a subsidiary in 1961 under the guidance of George Nicholson this remains a Yacht brokerage, charter and management company.

In 1989 Crest Nicholson sold Camper & Nicholsons International to new management, and in 1991 it merged with George Nicholson's company Solidmark.

==== Sinking of superyacht Bayesian ====
On 19 August 2024 the superyacht Bayesian sank in the Mediterranean. Camper and Nicholsons International were the service providers managing the vessel.

=== Acquisition by Crest Securities ===
In August 1972 Crest Securities, which had started as Crest Homes and was diversifying, merged with Camper and Nicholsons to form Crest Nicholson.

Although the quantity of boats, particularly GRP models, was increasing the margins were tight.

The Southampton shipyard closed in 1979, as access to the shipyard had been impacted by construction of the Itchen Bridge.

=== Management buyout ===
Crest Nicholson wished to refocus on the housing business and in April 1991 there was a management buyout and the company became Camper & Nicholsons Yachts Ltd. The firm, now only operating from the Gosport shipyard, and with the workforce cut from 250 to 65, moved from production building to building custom yachts.

=== Acquisition by Nautor's Swan ===
In July 2001 the Nautor's Swan group bought the Gosport yard, bringing it into the Nautor Group.

In 2005 the Gosport Yard was closed, bringing an end to shipbuilding on the site.

Archive material about the firm is preserved in a number of places, including the National Maritime Museum (Note: The Association of Yachting Historians in their journal article on Yachting Collections at the National Maritime Museum rank the Camper and Nicholson manuscript collection alongside that of William Denny, as being particularly noteworthy) and, even though not a Scottish Company, the Scottish Yachting Archives.

== People ==
Several people, some related and with similar names, had key roles in the company over its 200-year history.

=== Founders and first generation ===
Francis Calense Amos (1748-1824)
Born in Stepney, and trained as a shipwright. One of his sisters, Mary, married William Camper (1746-1809), and they had a son, William Camper (1768-1827), who named his son William Camper (1794-1863). Although Francis Amos married, it was his great nephew, William who ended up inheriting the business,

William Camper (1794-1863)
Apprenticed, aged 16, in 1809, to his great uncle, he took over the business when Francis died. He married Mary Murray (1795-18510), and they had two sons and three daughters, but both sons died in infancy. In 1863 William, wishing to ensure continuity of the firm, and the family name, created a document stating that his foreman, Ben Nicholson, would take over management of the firm, provided it be named 'Camper and Nicholson' and would make payments to the retiring William Camper from the profits.

Benjamin Nicholson (1828-1906)
Apprenticed to William Camper, aged 14, in 1842, he married Sarah Ann Watson in 1852. They had five boys and five girls, but one of the boys died in childhood. Three of the boys went on to run the firm after Ben's death. The eldest daughter, Rhoda, married Alfred Starling Blake, future Mayor of Portsmouth, and founder of the Solicitors firm Blake Lapthorn. Two other daughters married sons of Edwin Lapthorn (1834-1918), who ran Lapthorn sailmakers.

=== The second generation ===
Three of Ben Nicholson's sons had important roles in the firm.

Benjamin Watson Nicholson (1852-1927)
Also known as Ben Jr. to distinguish him from his father, he was a director until his retirement in 1924, but not a yacht designer. He married Gertude M. Exley, but they did not have any children.

Charles Ernest Nicholson (1868-1924)
A prolific yacht designer, with boats built at C&N and elsewhere. He married Lucy E Edmonds, and they had 3 sons and 3 daughters.

Arthur William Nicholson (1872-1957)
Like his brother Ben Jr, he was a director, but not a designer. He married Constance Ridgeway, and they had two children, of whom the son, Charles Arthur Nicholson (1906-1993), also joined the firm as a yacht designer.

=== Third generation ===
John Watson Nicholson (1899-1976)
He worked for the firm and became chairman in 1993, following the death of Charles Arthur. He had 3 children, of whom Christopher John Nicholson (1932-2011) worked for the firm.

Charles Arthur Nicholson (1896-1975)
Son of Arthur Wiliam Nicholson. Like his uncle Charles Ernest, Charles Arthur was a yacht designer, notable for several racing yachts in the 1950s, for example several of the Yeomans and the South Coast One Design. He was known as Young Charlie to distinguish him from his uncle. He married Kathleen (Kay) Carr and they had two sons, Peter (1934-) and George (1937-), both keen sailors who worked for the firm.

=== Fourth generation ===
Christopher John Nicholson (1932-2011)
He joined the firm in the 1954, following a technical apprenticeship at John I Thornycroft at Woolson, and work at other shipbuilding firms.

Peter Nicholson (1934-)
As well as working as a manager and designer, for example on the Nicholson 32, he was Commodore of the Royal Yacht Squadron from 1994 to 2001, and chairman of the Royal National Lifeboat Institution from 2000 until 2004, when he was succeeded by Jock Slater.

George Nicholson (1937-2025)
From 1959 he largely worked in Cannes, talking to prospective yacht purchasers, but also qualifying for the 1960 Summer Olympics in the 5.5 Metre class. He left the firm in 1978 to form his own company, Solidmark, which merged in 1991 with Camper & Nicholsons International.

== Shipyards ==
Location of Gosport and Northam Yards

The company operated from two shipyards for much of its history, with some projects being combined efforts, for example with the Gosport Aircraft Company Flying boat hulls were built at Gosport, and then towed to Northam where the assembly was completed.

Gosport

Location of Gosport Yard

This was the original yard, leased by Francis Amos in 1872, and remaining in operation until 2005. It was located around the site of the present Endeavour Quay Boatyard, off Mumby Road, Gosport.

Northam (Southampton)

Location of Northam Yard

This yard was purchased, with J.G. Fay & Co. in December 1912, and remained in operation until 1979.

It was located at Northam on the banks of the River Itchen

== Naval vessels ==
Camper and Nicholson designed two Motor Gun Boats that were used during the Second World War: 117 ft long but preceded by a 110 ft prototype (MGB 501). The first 117ft were being built for the Turkish navy but taken over for RN use as MGB 502-509. They displaced about 95 tons and three Davey Paxman engines gave a top speed of 28 knots except MGB 509 which made 31 knots with Packard engines. They were to be armed with one 2-pdr gun, two twin heavy machine gun turrets, two light machine guns, a Holman projector, two torpedo tubes and 12 depth charges. MGB 502, 503 and 509 were completed with this armament but the others were finished as blockade runners with lighter armament. Late in the war they were refitted with heavier armament.

These MGBs were followed by a modified design with a broader beam for better sea-keeping displacing 115 tons. MGBs 511 to 518 all had Packard engines and a top speed of 31 knots. They were more heavily armed from the outset with a 6-pdr (57mm) gun fore and aft, two 20mm Oerlikon cannon either side of the bridge, four torpedo tubes, two rocket flare projectors and two depth charges. Full crew complement was 30 (including three officers).

Camper and Nicholson built three Ham-class minesweepers, HMS Altham, HMS Arlingham and HMS Felmersham between 1952 and 1954.

In 1961 C&N built HMNS Enugu, a 117 ft Sea Defence Boat, yard number 856 for the Nigerian Navy. She was the first ship to be built specifically for the Royal Nigerian Navy, and was launched on 30 June 1961 by Flora Azikiwe, wife of the Nigerian president, at the Gosport Yard. The plans are held by the National Maritime Museum at Greenwich.

== Motor yachts ==
Although the main interest of the business was on sailing yachts, the yards built hundreds of motor yachts as well.

=== S.Y. Highwayman ===
Designed by Charles E Nicholson, built in 1897 for Reverend Henry G. Watkins, this 62 ton, wooden screw steamer, LWL 75.4 ft was later owned by Lord Howard de Walden

=== Gelyce tenders ===
Designed by Charles E Nicholson in the early 1900s as tenders for larger racing yachts. The name Gelyce comes from the combined first and last letters of the names of the wives of Charles and his brothers. Gertie (married to Benjamin W), Lucy (married to Charles), and Constance (married to Arthur). Camper and Nicholson built nine of these 50 ft motor yachts between 1912 and 1930 as tenders for larger yachts.

=== M.Y. Pioneer ===
Built in 1913 for Paris Singer with a length of 45 m (148 ft) and a displacement of 399 tonnes, as yard number 210. This was the first diesel engine powered boat built at the yard, being powered by a 250 bhp Polar diesel engine. She was hired by the Royal Navy during the First World War as an auxiliary patrol vessel, and sold to the Government of Fiji in 1920, where she was used to convey government officials and inspect lighthouses. She was scuttled off Suva on 24 March 1939.

She is commemorated on a Fiji postage stamp.

=== M.Y. Ara ===
Ordered in 1913 as a Motor Yacht by a Frenchman, Auguste Heriot, but completed as a warship in 1917 for the French Navy, with Yard number 213, the 851-ton Ara was then sold to William K Vanderbilt II. He circumnavigated the globe in her, and she was used, under his captaincy, for voyages to Africa, Asia South America and the Galapagos islands, where he collected scientific specimens, now displayed at the Vanderbilt Museum. He privately published books about his voyages on the Ara, which exceeded 139,000 miles.

=== M.Y. Rhodora II ===
In 1925 Camper and Nicholsons built the 120 ton yacht Rhodora (Yard number 332) for Lionel de Rothschild. In 1929 he replaced it with the 709 ton yacht Rhodora II. This was equipped with an operating theatre and had a space to stow a Rolls-Royce.At the start of World War 2 she was requisitioned and converted into anti-submarine patrol vessel. She sank on 7th September 1940, following a collision with SS Ngataria. Lionel also owned the 25-ton motor launch Nigella, built by Camper and Nicholsons in 1929 (yard number 365).

=== M.Y. Vita/Alastor ===
In 1926 C&N built the 340 ton Motor Yacht Vita for Thomas Sopwith (Yard number 337), who then sold her, in 1929 to Sir John Shelley-Rolls, who renamed her Alastor after the poem Alastor by his relative Percy Bysshe Shelley.

She was requisitioned in 1939, and used to transport supplies to Navy ships anchored at the entrance to Strangford Lough.

On 11 March 1946 a fire in the galley spread, and although the crew escaped she sank, as is now a wreck on the sea bed.

=== M.Y. Crusader (1927) ===
In 1927 Camper and Nicholsons built the 545 ton Crusader (Yard number 341) for A. Kingsley Macomber. She had twin 250 hp 4 cylinder Sulzer diesel engines. He sold her in 1929 and she was renamed Saracen. By 1939, when she was requisitioned, she was owned by Lord Iliffe and called Radiant. She was armed with a 4-inch gun and used for anti-submarine escort duties. In November 1942 she was deployed to Campbeltown as a training vessel for the Anti Submarine Training Flotilla.

=== M.Y. Vita/Viva II ===
In 1929 Thomas Sopwith replaced his previous M.Y. Vita with a new 502 ton yacht (Yard number 360). She was used as the support ship for his yacht Endeavour in the 1934 America's Cup challenge.

T.O.M. Sopworth sold her to his business partner, Fred Sigrist, who renamed her to Viva II.

She was requisitioned September 1939, and on 8 May 1941 was attacked by an HE115 and sunk off Trevose Head with a loss of 19 lives.

=== M.Y. Crusader (1929) ===
In 1929 A. Kingsley Macomber replaced the M.Y. Crusader he purchased in 1927 with the larger 926 ton Crusader (Yard number 361).

She was bombed and sunk in 1941 in Portsmouth but refloated. She finally sank off Cranfield Point on 6 March 1947. Her 30 ft launch, survives.

=== M.Y. Monica ===
Designed by Charles E Nicholson and built in 1928 (Yard number 357) for Santiago E Soulas, who named her after his daughter. Having a steel hull 147 ft long and a 23 ft bean. Four years later she was sold and renamed Rion, then sold again in 1938 to Sir George Tilley (1866-1948, Chairman of Pearl Assurance Company). In 1939 she was requisitioned by the Royal Navy, and, as HMS Rion/HMS Noir, saw active service, including participating in the Dunkirk Evacuation, and, later, the capture of an E-Boat, and sinking of a submarine. Returned to her owner in 1947, she was sold on his death to Aristotle Onasis, in 1951 who renamed her Arion and used her as part of his cruising fleet, until 1956.

She was given, by Aristotle, as a wedding gift, to Prince Rainier and Grace Kelly, who renamed her Deo Juvante and spent their honeymoon on board.

She was sold in 1958, and renamed Daska, and again in 1985 and renamed Zein, again after the owner's daughter.

In 2007 she was sold again, and renamed M.Y. Grace (after Princess Grace), she name she still bears at present.

=== M.Y. Evadne ===
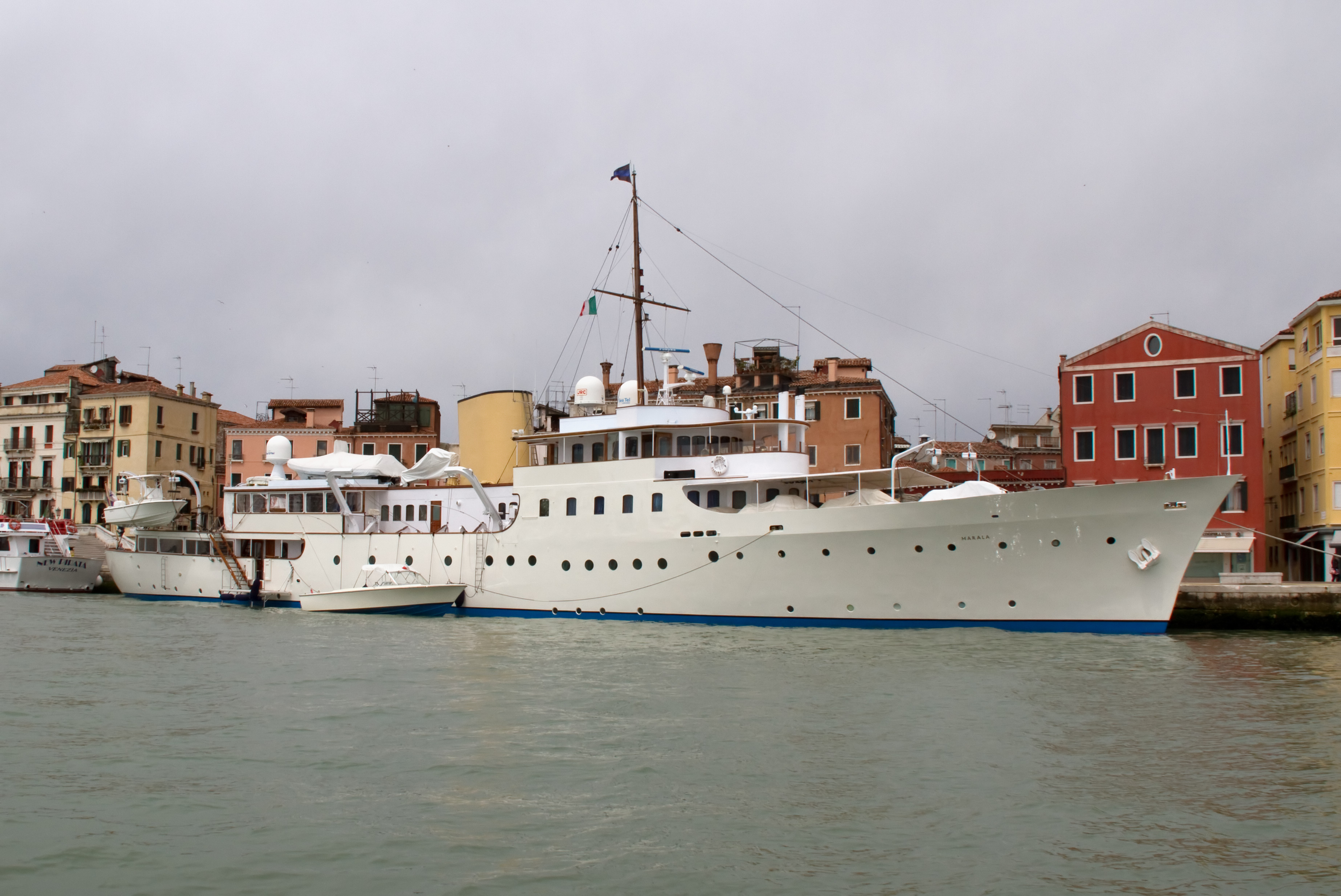
Marala (7248212232)

Built in 1931, with Yard Number 388 for Montague Napier, he died before he could take ownership, and this 193 ft Motor Yacht was sold to Ricard Fairey in December 1931. He lent Evadne to Amelia Earhart in 1932 after weather conditions forced her to end her Transatlantic Solo Flight in Ireland rather than Paris, so she could meet her fans at Cherbourg.

He lent Evadne to the Royal Navy for the duration of World War Two, and sold her in 1950 to R. J. Reynolds Jr. who was having Aries built by Camper and Nicholsons.

Other significant owners include

- Arturo Lopez-Willshaw, who inherited a fortune built on Guano, renamed her to Gaviota IV and had her interior refitted by Georges Geffroy.
- Robert de Balkany, husband of Princess Maria Gabriella of Savoy

She is still sailing today as Marala

=== M.Y. Llanthony ===
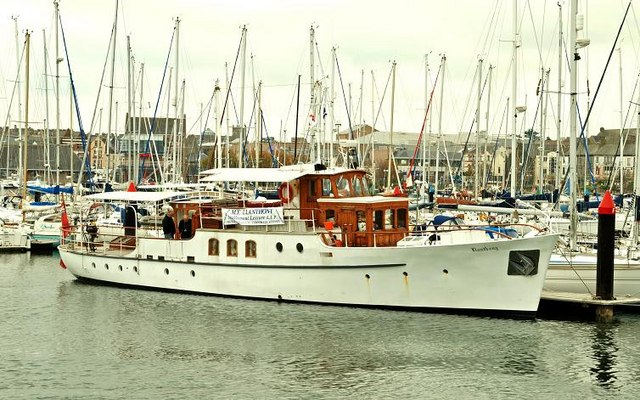
The Llanthony at Bangor

Built in 1934 for Lionel Beaumont-Thomas, with yard number 406 the 62 Thames Measurement ton, 73 ft MY Llanthony was one of the Little Ships of Dunkirk, commanded by Robert Timbrell.

=== MY Philante/HNoMY Norge ===
Philante was ordered by Thomas Sopwith in 1936, and launched in 1937, this 80.6 m motor yacht was used for family cruising and as a base for his interest in sailing J-Class yachts. With the outbreak of the Second World War Philante was acquired by the Royal Navy, and used as a training ship. In 1947 she was bought by Norway as a Royal Yacht and renamed The Royal Yacht Norge.

=== Northwind II ===
In 1966, Camper and Nicholsons built the motor yacht Chambel IV for French industrialist Paulin Richier. She was renamed NorthWind II by her subsequent owner in 1970. Northwind II's interior was decorated by Maison Jansen, and feature Burmese teak panelling banded with 22 carat gold.

=== Hedonist ===
Hedonist, an 83 ft (25 m) luxury yacht was built in 1970 (as yard number 969) for the, then 25 year old, Michael Pearson, 4th Viscount Cowdray, certainly lived up to the name. She carried a Mini Moke and a powerboat, which was a small version of the one which won the 1969 Round Britain Powerboat Race. In the owners cabin was an electronically controlled 7 ft (2.1 m) circular bed, which could be rotated at the touch of a button, and a gimballed record player.

== Sailing yachts ==
The earliest recorded vessel built by Francis Amos was the 30 ft smack Commerce, built in 1821 for Matthias March. This was probably, as the name suggests, used for trading, as the master was not the owner. Records from the time before Ship registration are sparse, and indicate a mixture of commercial and pleasure sail boats.

A few of the more significant yachts are described below.

=== Anonyma ===
This 258 ton wooden brig was designed by William Camper and built in 1839 for Lieutenant Colonel the Honourable R. F. Greville (an early member of the Royal Yacht Squadron, elected in August 1825).

She was sold to Jardine, Matheson & Co, where by 1842 she was used as an Opium Clipper.

She sunk off Swatow on September 21st 1858.

=== Wyvern ===
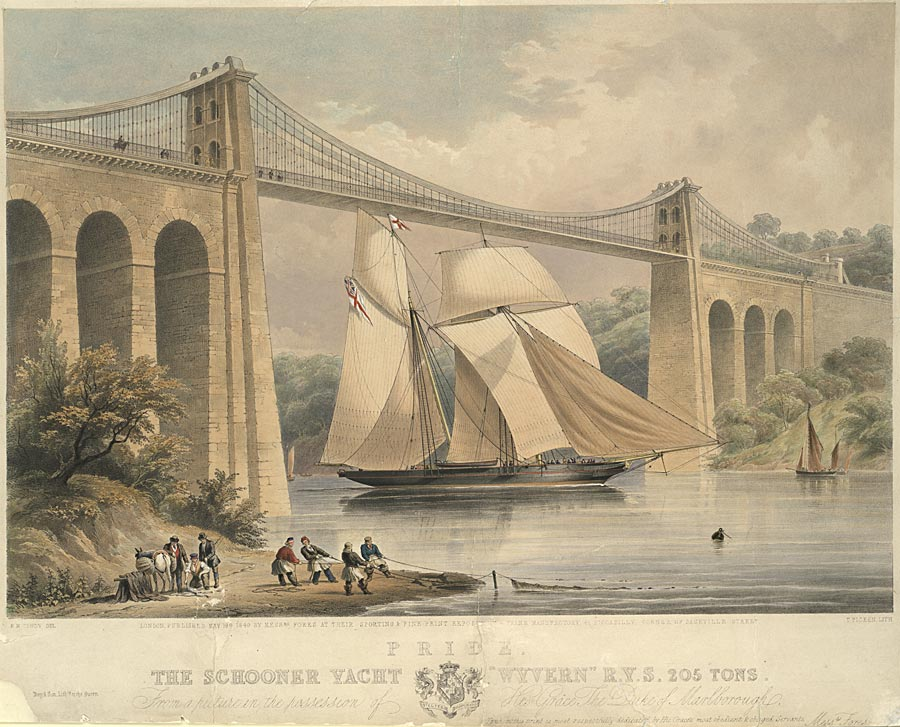
Pride. The Schooner Yacht "Wyvern" R.Y.S. 205 tons

Designed by William Camper and built in 1845 for The Duke of Marlborough, this 127 ton schooner was one of the participants in the first America's Cup.

Of the 19 entrants to the first America's Cup, two others, Fernande and Beatrice, were also designed by William Camper.

The yacht was sailed to Australia in 1854 with Lord Alfred Spencer-Churchill, the son of the Duke of Marlborough, to sell general cargo and possibly to sell the yacht. In September 1855, the Wyvern was sold for £1500 and used to transport cargo, mail, and passengers between Sydney, Australia and Wellington, New Zealand, including immigrants to New Zealand who traveled free on some passages. On July 1st, 1856, she departed Nelson, New Zealand, and is believed to have been lost in a severe gale in the Tasman Sea. Other ships making the same trip within days of the Wyvern experienced severe weather, including the Mountain Maid, who was dismasted in the storm. No survivors are known.

=== Foam ===
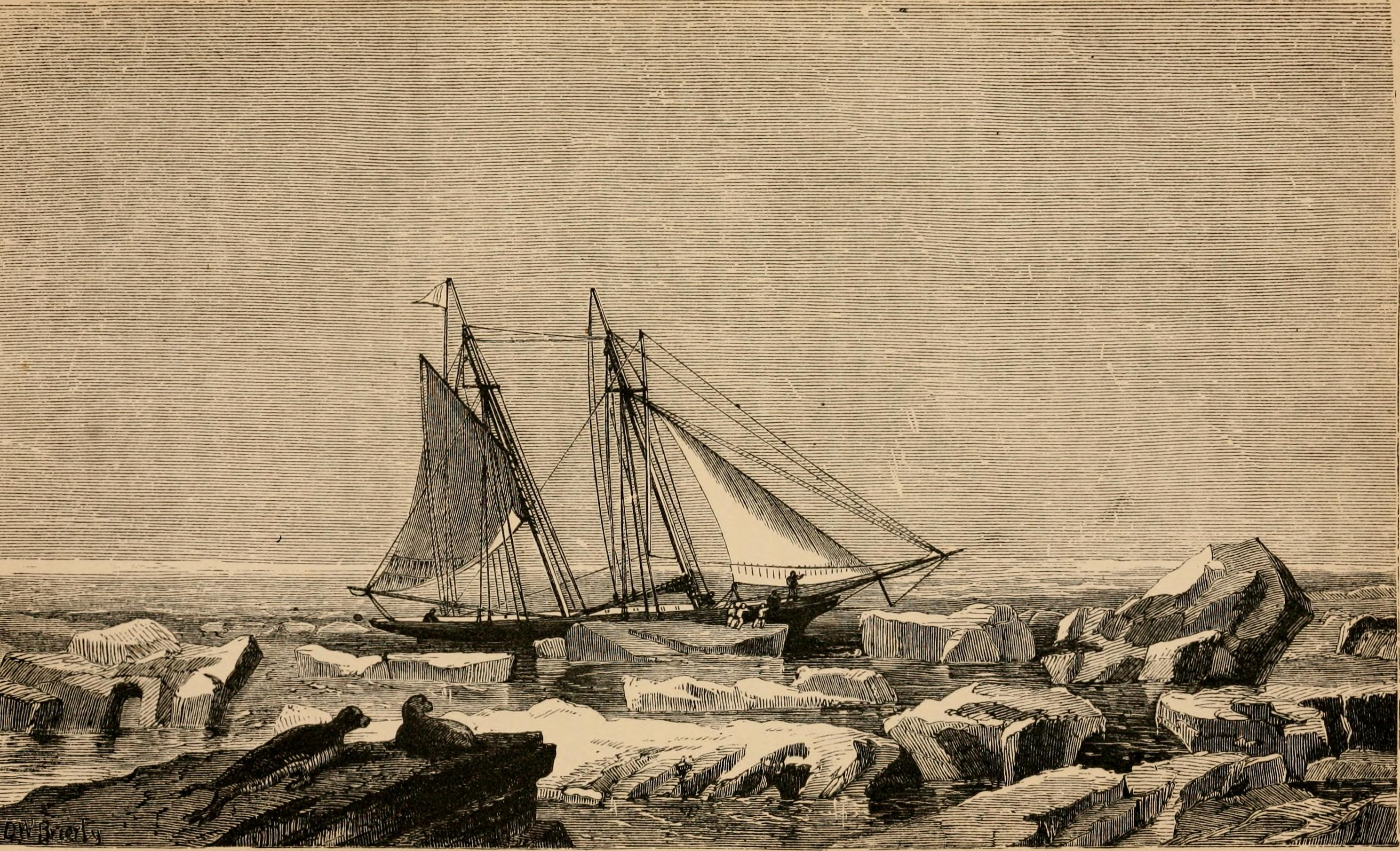
Foam as illustrated in 'Letters from high latitudes'

Built in 1848 from a design by William Campbell for John Thomline this 70 ton schooner was sold on to Lord Dufferin in 1854. He sailed her on a journey around the far Northern Atlantic, which he described in his book Letters from High Latitudes

=== Fernande ===
Designed by William Camper and built in 1849 for Major Francis Mountjoy Martyn, this 127 ton schooner was entered in the first America's cup, but did not participate in the race.

=== Erminia ===
Designed by John Fincham and built in 1849 for the Earl of Ellesmere. In February 1855 this schooner was sailed by his son, Algernon Egerton and Thomas Tower to Balaclava, carrying supplies funded by 'The Crimean Army Fund'. This fund was set up by the Times newspaper in response to reports of the suffering endured by soldiers fighting in the Crimean War

=== Beatrice ===
Designed by William Camper and built in 1851 for Sir Walter Palk Carew (8th Baronet), this 161 ton schooner was one of the participants in the first America's cup.

=== Morna ===
Built for William Houldsworth in 1869 and launched as Morna, then sold to Juliana, Baroness Mayer de Rothschild, and renamed Czarina. She was then sold back to Camper and Nicholsons, possibly in part payment for the larger Czarina (1877). She was then sold to the Royal Navy and commissioned as HMS Undine and used as an anti-slavery ship off the East Coast of Africa in 1881. Transferred to Sydney in 1883 she was sold by the Navy in 1888. Bought to be part of the pearling industry and renamed Ruby, she was wrecked on a reef in March 1890.

=== Waterwitch ===
Built in 1880 for Edward C. Baring, this 159 ton schooner was later owned by Lord Barrymore.

=== Partridge ===
In 1885 Partridge, the world's oldest still fully operational classic racing yacht was built at the Gosport Yard to a design by John Beavor-Webb.

=== Amphitrite ===
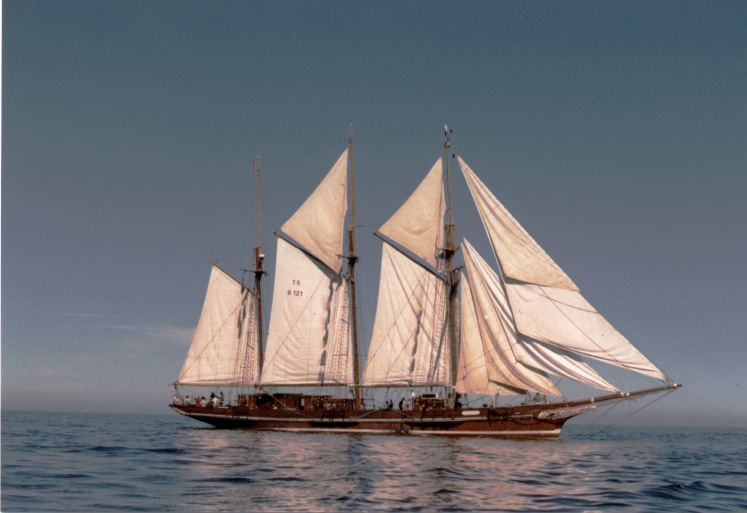
Segelschiff-Amphitrite

The last vessel to be designed by Ben Nicholson, launched in 1887 with yard number 67, and sold to Lieutenant-Colonel A. D. MacGregor, this 121 ton schooner is still sailing today. During the late 1960s she was owned by François Spoerry, architect of Port Grimaud. She was also owned by Horst Film GmbH and used in two films. During her history she has been through various rigs and names (Dolores, Joyfarer, Hinemoa), and is currently a sail training ship based in Hamburg.

=== Dacia ===
Built in 1892 for Hercules Langrishe, this 5-rater made its designer, Charles E Nicholson, famous in the yachting world. Langrishe had already had Camper and Nicholsons build a 20 ft cutter for his yacht Sameona, and found the cutter to be very fast. He developed a taste for small yacht racing and in 1891 had William Fife, one of the leading designers of the time, design the 5-rater Iernia, which was built at Campers, but proved not to be as fast as Langrishe had expected. Hoping to repeat the success of his cutter, Langrishe then commissioned Charles to design, and build Dacia. While still being built, the yard was visited by George Lennox Watson, the other great designer of the time, who seeing her commented 'That'll be a verra fast boat'. This turned out to be the case. In 6 weeks Dacia won all 14 races she entered.

The Earl of Dudley, who had crewed on Dacia in some of these races, was so impressed by her performance that he bought her from Langrishe for over twice the amount Langrishe had paid for her.

Later in 1892, with Charles Nicholson at the helm, she beat Natica the star boat of G. L. Watson, in two races out of 3 in a contest at Torbay, though then disqualified from the third race on a protest.

=== Length and Sail-Area rule era keelboats ===
From 1887 to 1895 the Yacht Racing Association used the Length and Sail Area Rule, which was simply Length x SailArea / 6000. The yard had developed a reputation for quality, as demonstrated by the customers who came to them, in some cases to build a design from an external designer such as J Beavor-Webb, G L Watson, Arthur E Payne and William Fife. Racing smaller yachts, such as the half rater (for example a 15 ft boat with a 200 square foot sail area), which could be sailed by two people became popular. (Note: A description of the popularity of inshore sailing at this time, particularly amongst yachtswomen, can be found in "Cruising and Small Yacht Sailing on the Solent", a chapter by Barbara Hughes in The Sportswoman's Library Volume II. Susan Barbara Hughes was the sister of Grace Atkinson Hughes, who, having married George Alfred Schenley (son of Mary Schenley), is referred to as Mrs. Schenley, but was also a keen yachtswoman.)

=== Avel II ===
This 59.5 ft cutter, designed by Charles E Nicholson was ordered in early 1896 for Rene Calame, a wealthy Frenchman. She was built, with yard number 124, in just four months and launched on May 14. She was named for a wind which blows in Brittany.

By 1927 she was in a poor state, half buried in the mud of a river in SouthEast England, where she lay until 1990 when she was bought by Maurizio Gucci, who restored her, and sailed her together with his larger yacht Creole.

Today she is still sailed by Maurizio's daughters.

=== Gull ===
Built in 1896, with yard number 126, this 18 ton cutter took part in the first Fastnet Race in 1925. By this time she was owned by Harry Donegan of Cork, the presence of an Irish boat allowing this to qualify as in international race.

She had been bought by a member of the Cork Cruising Club in 1920, and then sold to Harry Donegan in 1921. In 1922, during the Irish Civil War, she carried messages (carried by Michael Collin's sister), between Emmet Dalton and Michael Collins, as other means of means of communication had been disrupted by anti-treaty forces.

She was wrecked on the Sussex coast after the Second World War.

=== Redwing class ===
Designed in 1896 by Charles E. Nicholson, as a one-design keelboat class, the first one launched in 1897 was Paroquet, followed by over 20 others. They were all 22.1 ft (6.7 m) LOA, 16 ft (4.9 m) LWL. Nautilus (Redwing 5) was owned by John Isaac Thornycroft (the same name as his first steam launch).

So popular was the design that Charles was asked to revisit it in 1937, when he produced the second Redwing design, with an LOA of 27.9 ft (8.5 m).

The design of the Redwing class was unusual in that, while all the hulls were identical, they could be rigged however the owner wished, provided the sail area did not exceed 200 sq. ft. The owner of Kestrel, Lt Colonel John Moore-Brazabon (later Lord Brabazon), took advantage of this to rig her as an autogyro. Kestrel is in the collection of the Classic Boat Museum in Cowes. His son Derek Moore-Brabazon also owned a Redwing Paroquet, which was 2nd Redwing 1.

=== Brynhild / Black Swan ===
Built in 1899, with yard number 142, for Major Selwyn Calverley as an 80 ft yawl, but restored in 1999/2002 as a ketch, and renamed Black Swan, she was used by Francesco da Mosto in his BBC travel documentary series Francesco's Mediterranean Voyage.

=== Ilex ===
Built in 1899, with yard number 143, for T. H. Adkins of Portsmouth, this 20 ton cutter was bought for £850 by the Royal Engineers Yacht Club, who promptly entered her into the 1926 Fastnet Race, which she won.

=== Glory ===
Built in 1901, with yard number 152, for Sir Henry Seymour-King, this 110 ft.yawl was unusual in that she was designed by Arthur Edward Payne, rather than Charles E Nicholson, although Sir Henry had had two previous yachts designed by Payne, who was also well regarded.

=== Sylvana / Orion ===
This 254 ton auxiliary schooner was built for Lt Colonel Courtnay CE Morgan, with yard number 191 in 1910. She went through a number of owners, and names, and is still sailing, under the name Orion

=== 15 metre yachts ===
- Istria was a 15-metre class built in 1912 (yard number 204) for Sir Charles Allom. She had an innovative design, including laminated planking, and what Charles E Nicholson described as a jib-headed jackyard topsail, whose resemblance to the Marconi radio mast caused it to become known as a 'Marconi Rig'. Amongst other weight saving measures the onboard crockery was made of light alloy.
- Pamela, built in 1913, with yard number 208, for Mr S. Glen L. Bradley. almost identical to Istria.
- Paula III built in 1913, with yard number 209, for Herr Ludvig Sanders, very similar to Pamela

=== J-class yachts ===
The J-class were specialised sailing yachts built to compete in races including the America's Cup between 1914 and 1937. J-Class yachts built by Camper and Nicholson include

- Shamrock IV - Built for Sir Thomas Lipton, launched in 1914 and competed in the 1920 America's Cup
- Shamrock V - Built for Sir Thomas Lipton, launched in 1930 and competed in the 1930 America's cup
- Velsheda - Built for William Lawrence Stephenson, launched in 1933, and competed in many yacht raced, mainly in British waters.
- Endeavour - Built for Sir Thomas Sopwith, launched in 1934 and competed in the 1934 America's Cup
- Endeavour II - Built for Sir Thomas Sopwith, launched in 1936 and competed in the 1937 America's Cup

=== Barbara ===
Barbara (barbarayacht.com) is one of the first examples of easy sailing: a new way of designing yachts with a Marconi/Bermudian sail pian and mizzen mast that allows a small crew. Built in a light but hardy way, with teak and pitch pine timber on white oak frames. She was built in 1923 (design n. 318 by Charles Ernest Nicholson) by the Camper and Nicholsons shipyard for Herbert T. Hines (1870-1957) a notable insurer of the Royal Exchange Assurance Corporation in London. In 1926 the ownership was transferred to the Londoner Harold Francis Edwards. In 1928, the Baron Amaury de la Grange (1888-1953) bought the boat, registering it in Dunkirk and then in Cannes, France. In 1930, Barbara became a property of the Commander Jean Alexandre Melchior de Vogue (1898-1972), a member of the well-known French De Vogue family. De Vogue kept the mooring in Cannes until the 1950s.

Since the 1960s, Barbara changed different owners, bringing significant changes to the structure of the boat. The sail pian was reduced, like many other boats. The helm bacarne swivel, the bowsprit was replaced with a bathing platform, the mainmast boom was shortened and the stern's bowsprit was eliminated.

In 1982 Barbara was the support boat for Prince Sergio Ferrero for his Guinness world record windsurfing cross of the Atlantic Ocean in 24 days.

In 1998, the boat, badly maintained, was entrusted to Astilleros Mediterraneo, in Malaga, known for the restoration of William Fife 11l's 1906 auric cutter Eva.

In 2014 lt was decided to move Barbara to Viareggio, finishing the long philological refitting project, based on the originai drawings from 1923, with the goal of bringing Barbara back to the originai project. Barbara has been entrusted to the Francesco Del Carlo shipyard for a philological refitting, led by a team of experts, with the support of Viareggio's Historical Sails.

Despite the loss of most of the originai drawings, due to the fire that broke out in the Camper and Nicholsons archives in Gosport in 1941, some tables of Barbara's original plans were kept at the National Maritime Museum, allowing the super expert of historic boats Chicco Zaccagni with the vice-president VSV Commander Riccardo Valeriani and the Architect Gian Marco Ciboddo to carry out a complete philological restoration.

In 2018, twenty years after her last navigation, and ninety-five years from its first sail, Barbara finally returned to sailing.

The return earned her the important Assonautica prize, given for her restoration at the Imperia Vintage Sails in 2018.

In 2019 Barbara won the AIVE cup (ltalian Association of Vintage Sails) of the Tyrrhenian Sea in the “Vintage Yachts” category.

=== Vira / Creole ===
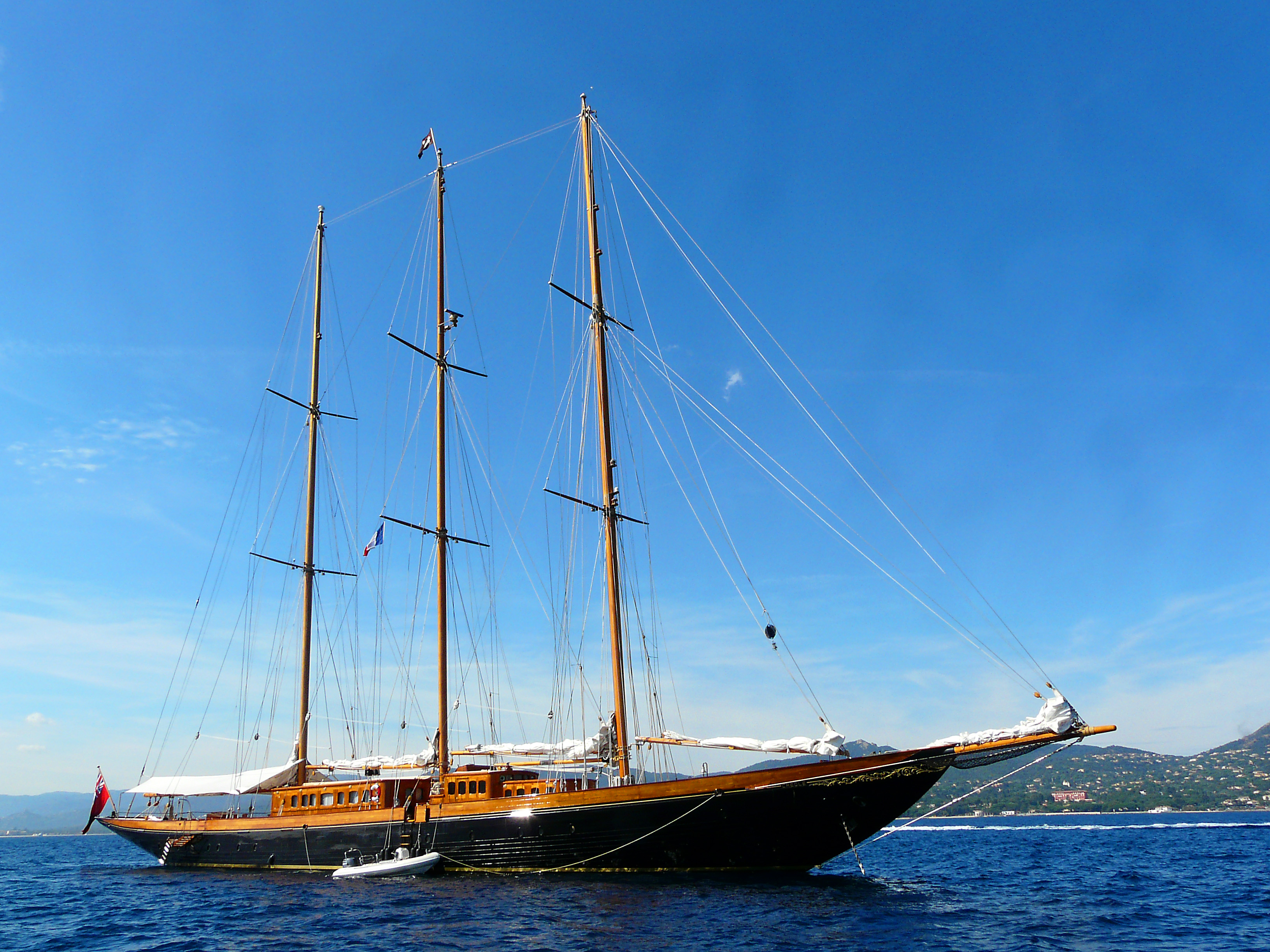
Le yacht Creole

Vira was built in 1927 for Alexander Smith Cochran, this 689-ton staysail schooner is the largest sailing yacht ever built at the Gosport Yard (yard number 346). She remains the largest wooden sailing yacht in the world. Her original owner thought the masts were too high, and insisted they be reduced.

She was sold to Major Maurice Pope in 1928, and renamed Creole, after a favourite dish of his. She was sold to Sir Connop Guthrie in 1937, who restored the masts to their original design. During the Second World War she was requisitioned and, renamed Magic Circle used for mine hunting duties, after which she languished for a time as Sir Guthrie had died.

In 1947 she was bought by Stavros Niarchos, who had her restored to a state of great luxury by 1951. In May 1970 Eugenia Livanos died on the Niarchos family's private island Spetsopoula and her body was brought back the mainland aboard Creole.

From 1978 to 1983 she was used as a Sail Training Ship at the Nyborg Søfartsskole (Seamnship school). In 1982 she was bought by Maurizio Gucci, and lavishly restored, and at the insistence of Maurizio's wife, Patrizia, even checked by a medium called Frida, who claimed to have found the spot where Eugenia Niarchos had died.

=== Feo ===
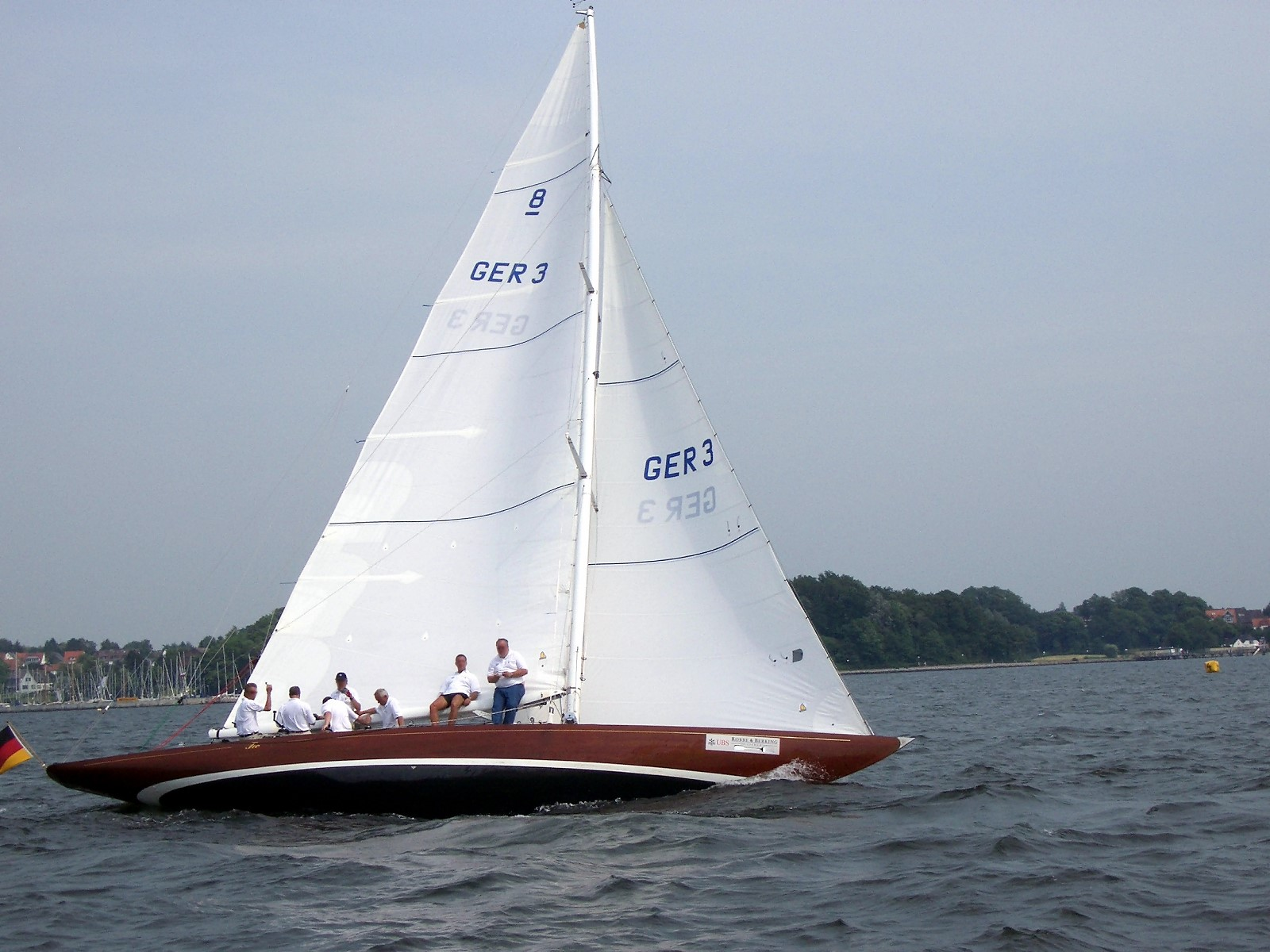
Segelboot 8mR

An 8 Metre International Rule keelboat built at the Gosport yard in 1927 for Margaret Roney, with yard number 352. Feo was crewed by Margaret, and helmed by her brother Ernest in the 8 Metre class at the 1928 Summer Olympics, coming in 7th place. She is still sailing and entered the Geneva 2022 8 Metre World Cup.

=== Ailée II ===
Built in 1928 for Virginie Hériot, this three-masted, steel-hulled schooner, with yard number 356 beat Sonia II, owned and sailed by Joe Carstairs, by 9 minutes and 40 seconds in a race from Ryde to the Le Havre Light vessel and back in July 1931.

The race was proposed in the office of Charles E Nicholson, who offered a cup 'The Coupe Nicholson', made by Georg Jensen, to the winner. Virginie had a special cabinet built in Ailée II to hold it.

On Virginie's death in 1932 she was donated to the École navale for use as a training vessel, until she was scuttled in 1944.

=== Flica ===
Designed as a collaboration between Charles E Nicholson and Richard Fairey (who had a low speed wind tunnel built at Fairey Aviation's Hayes site to research sail design). This 3rd International Rule 12 Metre was built in 1929 with Yard number 367. She went on to win 50 of the 58 races she entered in 1932, with Richard Fairey at the helm. She was sold to Sir Hugh Goodson in 1934.

=== Gadwall ===
The last of 6 Sister ships in the Xyris class, were the first example of a production series by C&N, the design attributed to Charles was the first laid up on spec without a specific client instructing. Based on the successful Tar Baby, a shortened 30' sloop with a cabin and fully equipped, including a dining set, mahogany swim ladder and the other bare necessities. The xyris class was promoted as a complete package off the shelf for £850.

=== Sonia II ===
A three-masted, steel-hulled 430 ton schooner built in 1931. Designed by Charles E Nicholson specifically for her owner, Joe Carstairs, who although better known for her interest in power boats, was also a keen yachtswoman, taking an active interest in the details of the design, and racing her against Ailée II.

When Joe Carstairs left England she lived primarily on Sonia II (and her cabin cruiser Berania)

Sonia II was the model for the Sail Training Association ship Sir Winston Churchill.

=== Dragon keelboats ===
A Dragon Class keelboat, Bluebottle, built by Camper and Nicholson in 1948 with yard number 746, was given to Princess Elizabeth and Prince Philip as a wedding present by the Island Sailing Club in Cowes. She was sailed in the 1956 Summer Olympics in Melbourne, crewed by Graham Mann, Ronald Backus and Jonathan Janson and won Bronze.

As well as Bluebottle, Camper and Nicholson built at least 16 Dragon class keelboats

List of Dragon-class boats
Name	Yard number	Sail number	Year	Owners	Notes
Valhalla	728	K 144	1947	J.Micheal. F. Crean MC (1948); Sir Gordon Smith (Burnham) (1950);	
Clare	729	K 145	1947	Owen Aisher and John Lowein; H. Connell	
Ganymead	730	K 143	1947	John Raymond and Honourable Micheal Berry (1947-1952)	
Rhythm	731	K 142	1947	G.B.Bowles;	
Carannia	738	K 197	1948	Bertrand Cotton	
Ceres II	739	K 203	1948	W Barnett	
Echidna	740	K 210	1948	R.S Hudon MP and R.W. Hudson	
Nirvana	741	K 198	1948	J.R.Carr	
Jabbawock	742	K 199	1948	W. Beck	
Grendell	743	K 200	1948	Robert A. Mitchell Jnr	
Fafner II	744	K 202	1948	Austen Trevor Boyd MBE	
Apollyon	745	K 201	1948	E.D. Mitchell (Belfast)	
Sabre	750	K 215	1948	HR Freemantle (Solent) (1948); Lt Col. T.V.Somers (Solent) (1952)	1952 Olympics
Snapdragon II	756	K 211	1949	James Marcus Seabag-Montefiore	
Satyr	781	K 231 (IR31)	1951	R. A Mitchell	
Buccaneer	786	K 256	1952	Major GEW Potter MC	
Painted Lady III	797	K 271	1954	TAH Beddington	
Sheerwater	819		1957	Nicholas Monsarrat	
Voodoo	838	K 315	1959	A Slater	
Blue Dolphin	839	K318 (DB31)	1959	G & T Glanville	

=== Yeoman ===
Owen Aisher commissioned several Yachts from Camper and Nicholson, all named Yeoman. One was a Fastnet Race winner, and three others competed in the Olympic 5.5 Metre class.

Yeoman
Commissioned in 1935, designed by Charles E Nicholson and launched in 1936 with yard number 434.

Yeoman II
Another Charles E Nicholson design, with yard number 770, this 19 ton yacht counted the 1951 Fastnet Race among her many successes.

Yeoman IV
An International 5.5 metre, designed by Charles A Nicholson (Young Charlie), and launched in 1952 with yard number 789.

Yeoman V
Another International 5.5 metre, designed by Charles A Nicholson (Young Charlie), and launched in 1955 with yard number 810. Also built in 1955 for Owen Aisher, with yard number 809 was the 12 ton launch Yeomana

Yeoman VI
An International 5.5 metre, designed by Peter Nicholson (elder son of Charles A Nicholson), and launched in 1959 with yard number 841.

Yeoman VII
This International 5.5. metre was not built by Camper and Nicholson, but designed by Einar Ohlson and built at Svinevikens Yacht Yard. She took 6th place in the 1960 Summer Olympics, helmed by Robin Aisher, Owen's son, with Charles.A.Nicholson's younger son George Nicholson and John Ruggles as crew.

Yeoman VIII
An International 5.5 metre, designed by Bill Luders, and launched in 1960 with yard number 855.

Yeoman IX
A 9 ton ocean racer, designed by 'Young Charlie', and launched in 1960 with yard number 847

Yeoman XI
A Nicholson 36 (number 9) yard number 892

=== Foxhound ===
Built in 1935 for the Irish-American offshore racer and huntsman Isaac 'Ikey' Bell, with yard number 424, this 63.2 ft cutter came fourth in the 1935 Fastnet race. Ike upgraded to the Bloodhound, and Foxhound was bought by the Hon Emily Rachel Pitt-Rivers (née Forster)., who sailed her in the 1956 Newport Bermuda Race, as the only lady skipper.

=== Bloodhound ===
Designed by Charles Ernest Nicholson and built in June 1936 for Ike Bell. After being raced successfully under several owners, Bloodhound was purchased by Queen Elizabeth II and Prince Philip in 1962 to replace Bluebottle as a yacht for the Duke to race which would also accommodate his family.

=== Aries / White Heather ===
A 125-ton, 102 ft, auxiliary ketch, designed in 1952 for R. J. Reynolds Jr. with yard number 785. She was launched by Muriel Reynolds, his third wife on 4 September 1952.

R.J. Reynolds also purchased the Motor Yacht Evadne, for use while Aries was being built.

=== South Coast One Design ===
The South Coast One Design (SCOD) was a wooden 25 ft keelboat designed by Charles A Nicholson in 1955. 106 were built, mostly by other builders, but numbers 51 to 54 (Yard numbers 831 to 834 were built at the Northam Yard in 1959–60).

The design was very successful, with SCODs taking the first 6 places in the 1956 Round the Island Race (note that these were not C&N built ones).

=== Gipsy Moth IV ===
Built in 1966 specifically for Sir Francis Chichester's single-handed circumnavigation of the globe, and restored in 2004 at the Gosport yard

=== Morning Cloud IV ===
Built in 1975, with yard number 1390, for Edward Heath. The 45 ft aluminium hall was made by Allday Aluminium, a Camper and Nicholson subsidiary. The design was by Sparkman & Stephens.

=== GRP Yachts ===
The firm built a number of Fiberglass (GRP) yachts, starting with the Nicholson 36, in 1960. The hulls were built by Halmatic Ltd, or later some by Seabourne Plastics.

Nicholson 36
Designed by Peter Nicholson and Charles A Nicholson, with an LWL of 26 ft, a displacement of 16,850 lb, a fin keel and masthead sloop rig. 26 were built, starting in 1960.

Nicholson 32
Designed by Peter Nicholson and Charles A Nicholson, with an LWL of 24 ft, a displacement of 12,200 lb, a long keel and masthead sloop rig. 369 were built, starting in 1962 and ending in 1981.

Gulliver G, a Mark IV, built in 1966, was sailed single-handed across the Atlantic by Clare Francis in 1973, and by Clare Francis and Eve Bonham in the 1974 Round Britain Race.

Nicholson 26
Designed at Camper & Nicholson, but built at Burnes Shipyard, with an LWL of 20 ft, a displacement of 10,280 lb, a long keel and transom hung rudder and a masthead sloop rig. 64 were built, starting in 1968.

Nicholson 38
Designed by John Alden & Associates with an LWL of 27 ft, a displacement of 15,904 lb, a long keel, and masthead ketch rig. 134 were built, starting in 1966 and ending in 1975.
The first was exhibited at the 1966 London Boat Show and was built alongside Gipsy Moth IV.

Nicholson 43
Designed by Raymond Wall with an LWL of 30 ft, a displacement of 19,842 lb, a fin keel with rudder on skeg, and masthead sloop rig. 37 were built, starting in 1969.
It was declared 'Boat of the Show' in the 1969 London Boat Show.

Nicholson 48
Designed by Raymond Wall with an LWL of 34.33 ft, a displacement of 31,300 lb, a fin keel with rudder on skeg, and masthead ketch rig. 42 were built, starting in 1972.

Nicholson 55
Designed by Raymond Wall with an LWL of 39.14 ft, a displacement of 38,029 lb, a fin keel with rudder on skeg, and masthead sloop rig. 26 were built, starting in 1971.

A notable example was the Second Yacht Lutine, owned by Lloyd's of London Yacht Club, Yard number

Another notable example was Adventure, yard number 1143, built for the Royal Naval Sailing Association, which competed in the 1973–1974 Whitbread Round the World Race winning the first leg, and taking second place overall.

Overall the Royal Navy ordered 12 Nicholson 55s

Nicholson 70
Designed by Raymond Wall and Camper & Nicholson with an LWL of 54 ft 6 in (16.61 m), a displacement of 111,700 lb, a fin keel with rudder on skeg, and masthead ketch rig. Seven were built, starting in 1975.

Nicholson 33
Designed by Ron Holland with an LWL of 27.58 ft, a displacement of 10,054 lb, a fin keep with spade rudder and a masthead sloop rig. 69 were built, starting in 1975.

The first built, Golden Delicious yard number 1398, won the 1975 Fastnet Race, sailed by Richard Bagnall. She was also sailed by Ron Holland into second place in the 1975 Three Quarter Ton Cup at Hanco.

In 2005 Iromiguy yard number 1469, sailed by Jean-Yves Chateau also won the Fastnet Race, an impressive feat for a 30 year old boat.

Nicholson 31
Designed by Raymond Wall with an LWL of 24.17 ft, a displacement of 13,005 lb, a long keel and transom hung rudder and a masthead sloop rig. 119 were built, starting in 1976.

Nicholson 27
Designed by Peter Milne with an LWL of 23.33 ft, a displacement of 2,700 lb, either a fin keel with transom hung rudder or a twin (bilge) keel, and fractional sloop rig. 20 were built, starting in 1978 and ending in 1981. The hulls were moulded at Seabourne Plastics in Littlehampton, which was a Crest Nicholson subsidiary.

Nicholson 58
Also known as the Bluewater 58. Designed by David Pedrick, with an LWL of 46.87 ft, a displacement of 53,025 lb, a keel with centreboard and staysail ketch rig. First built in 1984. The hull design was used by Sir Robin Knox-Johnson as the basis for the Clipper 60, sailed in the Clipper round the world yacht race.

== Other vessels ==
=== Royal Barge Nore ===
Built in 1951 for the Port of London Authority, this 53 ft motor launch, yard number 773, replaced an earlier 50 ft Gelyce type launch.

On 12 June 1953 she carried the Queen and Duke of Edinburgh from a reception in the Guildhall to the Royal Festival Pier.

On 30 January 1965 she led the Thames Funeral Procession of Sir Winston Churchill.

=== Royal Barge ===
Another Camper and Nicholson boat, a 40 ft launch built in 1964, yard number 905, which had been the tender to the Royal Yacht Britannia, became the Royal barge, and participated in the Thames Diamond Jubilee Pageant. She carried the Queen and Duke of Edinburgh to the Spirit of Chartwell.

=== Lifeboats ===
Camper and Nichsolson built ON 896, Douglas Hyde a 46ft 9in Watson-class lifeboat in 1951, yard number 763. Her official launch was 5 June 1952.

Four of the eleven Solent-class lifeboat were built by Camper and Nicholson:

- ON 1011 - Built in 1969 - R. Hope Roberts
- ON 1012 - Built in 1970 - City of Birmingham
- ON 1013 - Built in 1970 - Royal British Legion Jubilee
- ON 1014 - Built in 1970 - The Three Sisters

=== LANBY Buoys ===
Camper and Nicholsons built five Large Automatic Navigation Buoys (LANBY) for Trinity House in 1972-73 (Yard Numbers 1222–1224, 1235–123) and another six for General Dynamics (yard numbers 1241–1246)
