= George Nicholson (sailor) =

British sailor

Personal information
- Full name: George Ian Nicholson
- Nationality: British
- Born: 23 April 1937 Southampton, England
- Died: February 2025 (aged 87)

Sport
- Sport: Sailing

George Ian Nicholson (23 April 1937 – February 2025) was a British sailor. He is the son of Charles A Nicholson, a yacht designer, and great nephew of Charles E Nicholson, also a yacht designer. He worked for Camper and Nicholsons the yacht builders. He competed in the 5.5 Metre event at the 1960 Summer Olympics.
