= NorthWind II =

Northwind II is a classic 1960s luxury motor yacht, notable for the historic importance of her design.

== History ==
Northwind II was built in 1966 with yard number 914, at Camper and Nicholsons in Southampton, England. Launched as Chambel IV, she was renamed by her present owner in 1970. Her interior was decorated by Maison Jansen, the renowned French design firm whose clients included the John F. Kennedy White House, Coco Chanel, the Rockefellers, King Leopold II of Belgium, and the Shah of Iran. Maison Jansen closed in 1989.

== Restoration ==
In 2010 Northwind II was fully rebuilt and upgraded, her interior expertly restored. As one of the few remaining complete Jansen commissions, she has attracted great interest from connoisseurs of 20th-century interior design. Most recently, she was featured in the August 2011 issue of Architectural Digest. She is now privately owned in the Mediterranean.

== Technical details ==
Northwind II is 46m (150ft) long and 7.22m (23.7ft) wide, with a draught of 2.68m (8.8ft). She sleeps 10 passengers and 12 professional crew. Her main hull is steel, and her superstructure is mostly aluminum. She has a teak deck. Equipped with twin 600HP MAN diesel engines and screw propellers, she has a top speed of 15 knots and a cruising speed of 13 knots with an efficient range of 2275 nautical miles. She is equipped with Vosper zero speed stabilizers.
