= HM Motor Gun Boat 2007 =

Gunboat of the Royal Navy

History

United Kingdom
- Name: 2007
- Builder: Camper & Nicholson
- Launched: 24 August 1943
- Acquired: 1944
- Renamed: Launched in 1943 as Gay Corsair; HM Motor Gunboat 509 in 1944; HM Motor Gunboat 2007 in 1945
- Fate: Wrecked 24 May 1945

General characteristics
- Class & type: Motor gunboat
- Displacement: 95 long tons (97 t)
- Length: 117 ft (36 m)
- Beam: 20 ft 3 in (6.17 m)
- Draught: 4 ft 1 in (1.24 m)
- Propulsion: 3 × Paxman VRB engines; 3,000 bhp (2,200 kW)
- Speed: 28 knots (52 km/h) (max); 25 knots (46 km/h) (cruising)
- Range: 2,000 nautical miles (3,700 km) at 11 kn (20 km/h)
- Complement: 21
- Armament: 1 × 6-pounder Hotchkiss; 1 × 2-pounder pom-pom; 4 × 20mm machine guns; 2 × depth charges

HM Motor Gun Boat 2007 was a motor gunboat operated by Royal Navy Coastal Forces during the Second World War. She was initially built as one of eight gunboats ordered by the Turkish Navy, but which went on to see service in the North Sea as fast blockade runners. She was initially classed as the merchant vessel Gay Corsair, crewed by men of the merchant navy and sailing under the Red Ensign. She became HM Motor Gunboat 507 after being acquired by the Royal Navy, and finally HM Motor Gun Boat 2007. She was wrecked under this name in 1945.

== Construction ==
Gay Corsair was built by Camper and Nicholson as part of an order of eight motor gunboats placed by the Turkish Navy. She was launched on 24 August 1943 but the outbreak of the Second World War led to the craft being taken over by the Royal Navy and completed to take part in Operation Bridford. Bridford was an attempt to bring quantities of ball bearings out of neutral Sweden, past the German blockade. The ball bearings, and other specialist equipment manufactured in Sweden, were needed by British engineering plants, but while some supplies were being flown in these were not sufficient to meet the demand. The initial five boats taken from Camper and Nicholson were modified to accommodate greater quantities of cargo, and were prepared as blockade runners. Political exigencies meant that the boats were classed as merchant vessels operated by crews drawn from Hull trawlermen and officers from Ellerman Lines.

== Operations ==
The five boats, including Gay Corsair, were deployed in September 1943, with their voyages timed to pass areas of greatest danger during the hours of darkness. On arriving at the Swedish port of Lysekil they would load their cargoes, before sailing back to the Humber. Each leg of the journey took two days. The first attempt had to be postponed after problems developed with the boats' engines, and when it took place only Gay Viking made a successful round-trip. Further attempts were made, many of them successfully, despite some losses to the flotilla. Gay Corsair eventually made three trips, despite damaging her centre engine crankshaft on 6 March 1944. The operation was considered a success, but the trips were brought to an end with the return of the shorter nights in 1944. The voyages to Sweden were resumed in September 1944 under the name of Operation Moonshine, and involved carrying supplies and munitions to elements of the Danish resistance. Poor weather caused the cancellation of many of these attempts however.

== Royal Navy service and loss ==
Gay Corsair was taken into Royal Navy service in 1944, being armed and commissioned first as HM Motor Gun Boat 509, and then as HM Motor Gun Boat 2007 in 1945. She ran aground and was wrecked off Aberdeen on 24 May 1945.
