= Lutine (yacht) =

Lloyd's of London sailing yacht

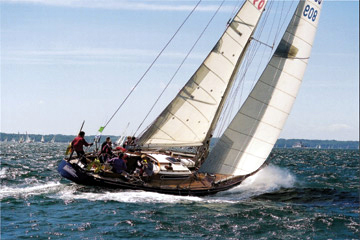
2nd Lutine and the first Camper and Nicholson 55. Built in 1970 and named Lutine when commissioned by Lloyd's of London Yacht Club, here she is Yacht Acclaim (2000) during the Round The Island Race

Yacht Lutine is the name given to all Lloyd's of London Yacht Club's (LLYC) sailing yachts, often with sail number GBR809

== First Yacht Lutine (C&N 60') ==
A Laurent-Giles designed Bermudan yawl, built by Camper and Nicholsons in 1952 with yard number 784, she is 58 ft length overall with an 8.5' draft. Now renamed Lutine of Helford. In 2014 Lutine I was listed for sale with an asking price of £339,000; the listing describes her as having been found "derelict" in 1999 and having undergone a complete rebuild before relaunch in 2001. She was evidently restored to excellent condition, and sold within a few months. A model is displayed in the Lloyd's Register of Shipping offices in Southampton having been loaned by the LLYC Commodore.

== Second Yacht Lutine (Nic 55) ==
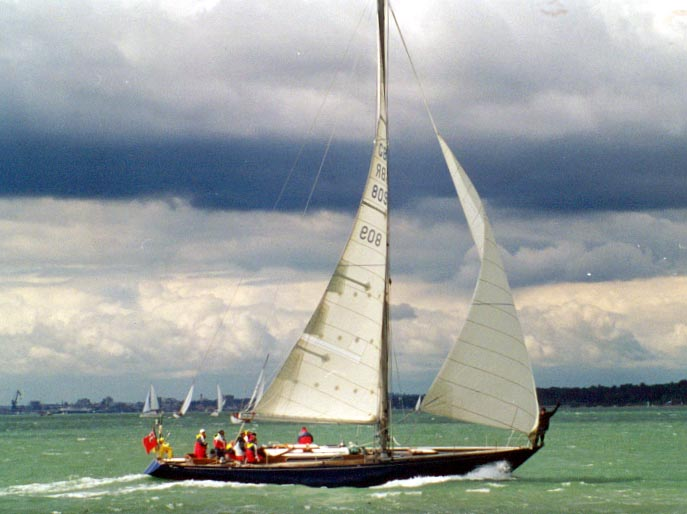
The first Nic 55 / 2nd Yacht Lutine. Here named Acclaim and sailing in Southampton water

Ray Wall designed the Camper and Nicholsons 'Nic 55' which LLYC commissioned. Launched in 1970 with yard number 1016, she is a 53.8' Bermudan sloop, with 8.3' draft and displacing 23 tons. Sold in 1999 and renamed Yacht Acclaim.

Acclaim was sold in August 2006 and taken to USA for an extensive rebuild and refit. Now renamed Eager with a 15 ft higher mast, it is back in the UK in her home port of Lymington on the Solent.

== Third Yacht Lutine (Swan) ==
A Germán Frers designed Nautor's Swan, 53' length overall, 8' draft, 22,000 lbs displacement sloop.

== Fourth Yacht Lutine (X-Yachts) ==
An X-Yachts designed X-55, 55' length overall, 10.5' draft sloop built in 2010 and purchased by the Lloyd's Yacht Club in 2014.
