= List of shipwrecks in September 1858 =

The list of shipwrecks in September 1858 includes ships sunk, foundered, wrecked, grounded, or otherwise lost during September 1858.

== 1 September ==
List of shipwrecks: 1 September 1858
Ship	State	Description
May Queen	United States	The ship was wrecked at sea. All 41 people on board were rescued by Sir John Moore (United Kingdom).

== 2 September ==
List of shipwrecks: 2 September 1858
Ship	State	Description
Brothers	United Kingdom	The ship driven ashore at Narva, Russia.
Cambria	United Kingdom	The ship foundered in the Atlantic Ocean. Her crew were rescued by Highland Chief (United Kingdom). Cambria was on a voyage from Liverpool, Lancashire to Montreal, Province of Canada, British North America.
Caroline	France	The ship ran aground on the Newcombe Sand, in the North Sea off the coast of Suffolk, United Kingdom. She was on a voyage from Sunderland, County Durham to Nantes, Loire-Inférieure. She was refloated and taken in to Lowestoft, Suffolk in a leaky condition.
Coert Cornelius	Flag unknown	The ship ran aground on Skagen, Denmark. She was on a voyage from Newcastle upon Tyne, Northumberland, United Kingdom to Saint Petersburg, Russia.
Enigheden	Flag unknown	The ship driven ashore at Narva.
Harriet and Francis	United States	The ship wrecked on the Arklow Bank, in the Irish Sea off the coast of County Wicklow. Eleven of her fifteen crew were rescued by the Arklow Lifeboat, the remainder by the fishing smack Catterini (United Kingdom). Harriet and Francis was on a voyage from Liverpool, Lancashire, United Kingdom to Baltimore, Maryland.
Henry	United Kingdom	The schooner was driven ashore and wrecked at Wick, Caithness. Her crew were rescued.
Leonard Hollis	United Kingdom	The schooner was driven ashore and damaged at Redcar, Yorkshire. She was on a voyage from Dublin to Newcastle upon Tyne. She was refloated and resumed her voyage.

== 3 September ==
List of shipwrecks: 3 September 1858
Ship	State	Description
Fanny	Russia	The brig was wrecked at Cherbourg, Manche, France. She was on a voyage from Bordeaux, Gironde, France to Liepāja.
Favourite	United Kingdom	The barque ran aground off Combwich, Somerset and was severely damaged.
Glennifer	United Kingdom	The barque was wrecked in Pistolet Bay. Her crew were rescued. She was on a voyage from Fleetwood, Lancashire to Quebec City, Province of Canada, British North America.
Harriet Frances	United States	The ship wrecked on the Arklow Bank, in the Irish Sea off the coast of County Wicklow, United Kingdom. Four of her crew were rescued. She was on a voyage from Liverpool, Lancashire to Baltimore, Maryland.
Mallacho	Flag unknown	The steamship was wrecked in the Bonny River with the loss of four of her crew. She was on a voyage from Fernando Po, Spanish Guinea to the Bonny River.

== 4 September ==
List of shipwrecks: 4 September 1858
Ship	State	Description
May Queen	United States	The ship was abandoned in the Atlantic Ocean. All on board were rescued by Sir John Moore (United Kingdom).
Steward Brothers	United Kingdom	The schooner ran aground and sank on Taylor's Bank, in Liverpool Bay. She was on a voyage from Liverpool, Lancashire to Belfast, County Antrim.

== 5 September ==
List of shipwrecks: 5 September 1858
Ship	State	Description
Jane Cockerell	United Kingdom	The barque was driven ashore at Helsingborg, Sweden. She was on a voyage from Hartlepool, County Durham to Kronstadt, Russia. She was refloated and taken in to Helsingør, Denmark for repairs.
Richard Battersby	United Kingdom	The barque ran aground in Howstow Bay and was captured by Chinese pirates, who killed three of her crew and wrecked the ship. She was on a voyage from Shanghai to Amoy, China.

== 6 September ==
List of shipwrecks: 6 September 1858
Ship	State	Description
Argus	United Kingdom	The ship was run down and sunk off Bahia, Brazil. Her crew were rescued. She was on a voyage from Pernambuco, Brazil to Liverpool, Lancashire.
Tempest	United States	The ship driven ashore at South Point, Bahamas. She was on a voyage from Liverpool to New Orleans, Louisiana. She was refloated and resumed her voyage, arriving on 11 September.
Norval	United Kingdom	The ship ran aground on "Worms Island", Russia. She was on a voyage from Kronstadt, Russia to Montrose, Forfarshire. She was refloated.
Verenigung	Prussia	The ship was driven ashore at Heisternest. She was on a voyage from Memel to Newburgh, Fife, United Kingdom.

== 7 September ==
List of shipwrecks: 7 September 1858
Ship	State	Description
Dove	United Kingdom	The smack foundered off Mevagissey, Cornwall. Her crew were rescued. She was on a voyage from Charlestown, Cornwall to Newport, Monmouthshire.
John and Isabella	United Kingdom	The brig ran aground on the Harker Rock, in the Farne Islands, Northumberland. She was on a voyage from Hamburg to South Shields, County Durham. She was later refloated and taken in to South Shields, where she arrived on 18 September.

== 8 September ==
List of shipwrecks: 8 September 1858
Ship	State	Description
Matilda	United Kingdom	The barque was driven ashore and wrecked in a hurricane at Maceió, Brazil. She was on a voyage from Liverpool, Lancashire to Pernambuco, Brazil

== 9 September ==
List of shipwrecks: 9 September 1858
Ship	State	Description
Albatros	United Kingdom	The ship in collision with the steamship Hawk (United Kingdom) and sank. Her crew were rescued. She was on a voyage from Jersey, Channel Islands to Newcastle upon Tyne, Northumberland.
Eduardo	France	The brig was driven ashore and wrecked at Sant'Antioco, Sardinia. She was on a voyage from Galaţi, Ottoman Empire to Falmouth, Cornwall, United Kingdom.
Margaretha	Denmark	The schooner collided with J. J. Hathorn (United Kingdom) and sank in Liverpool Bay off the Crosby Lightship ( Trinity House) with the loss of seven of the nine people on board. Survivors were rescued by the gig Jem (United Kingdom). Margareta was on a voyage from Liverpool, Lancashire, United Kingdom to Lübeck.
Sarah Jane	United Kingdom	The ship was driven ashore at Kronstadt, Russia. She was on a voyage from Liverpool to Kronstadt. She was refloated and taken in to Kronstadt, where she arrived on 11 September.
Tryingham	United States	The barque departed from Newcastle upon Tyne for Norfolk, Virginia. No further trace, presumed foundered with the loss of all hands.

== 10 September ==
List of shipwrecks: 10 September 1858
Ship	State	Description
Mary Muncaster	United Kingdom	The ship ran aground on a reef off the Rabbit Islands, Ottoman Empire. She was refloated and resumed her voyage.

== 11 September ==
List of shipwrecks: 11 September 1858
Ship	State	Description
Clans	United Kingdom	The ship driven ashore on Innisboffin, County Donegal. She had been refloated by 22 September and taken in to Dunfanaghy.
Eglantine	United States	The barque ran aground on French's Reef. She was refloated and taken in to Key West, Florida in a severely leaky condition.
Freundschaft	Danzig	The galiot foundered in the North Sea 2.5 nautical miles (4.6 km) off Cuxhaven. She was on a voyage from Newcastle upon Tyne, Northumberland, United Kingdom to Danzig.
Ganges	United Kingdom	The barque was driven ashore at "Donagion", 12 nautical miles (22 km) from Gallipoli, Ottoman Empire. She was on a voyage from Odesa to a British port.
Kingston	United Kingdom	The sloop was holed and sank at Leith, Lothian. She was refloated.

== 12 September ==
List of shipwrecks: 12 September 1858
Ship	State	Description
Malcolm	United Kingdom	The barque was wrecked on the Florida Reef. Her crew were rescued. She was on a voyage from the Rio de la Hacha to Queenstown, County Cork.

== 13 September ==
List of shipwrecks: 13 September 1858
Ship	State	Description
Austria	Hamburg	Austria. The passenger ship was destroyed by fire in the Atlantic Ocean with the loss of about 500 lives. Eighty-nine survivors were rescued; 22 by Caterina (Norway) and 65 by the barque Maurice (France).
Aventin	France	The steamship was in collision with the steamship Hermus (France) and foundered. All on board were rescued. She was on a voyage from Livorno, Grand Duchy of Tuscany to Civitavecchia, Papal States.
John Elliott Thayer	United States	The clipper was destroyed by fire at Patos Island, Venezuela.
Leven	United Kingdom	The schooner caught fire and sank.
Rosenhein	Prussia	The barque was driven ashore near Whitburn, County Durham, United Kingdom. She was refloated.

== 14 September ==
List of shipwrecks: 14 September 1858
Ship	State	Description
Ranger	United Kingdom	The steamship ran aground on the Swinebottoms, in the Baltic Sea. She was on a voyage from London to Saint Petersburg, Russia. She was refloated.

== 15 September ==
List of shipwrecks: 15 September 1858
Ship	State	Description
Cosmo	United Kingdom	The ship departed from Venice, Kingdom of Lombardy–Venetia for a British port. No further trace, presumed foundered with the loss of all hands.
Clydesdale	United Kingdom	The smack struck a reef at St Martin's, Isles of Scilly and was damaged. She was refloated and taken in to New Grimsby, Isles of Scilly.
Envoy	(United Kingdom of Great Britain and Ireland) Jersey	The ship struck The Manacles and sank. She was on a voyage from Pernambuco, Brazil to Plymouth, Devon and Liverpool, Lancashire.
Flora	United Kingdom	The ship wrecked on the Mull of Kintyre, Argyllshire. Her crew were rescued. She was on a voyage from Liverpool to Loch Alsh.
Jacob	United States	The barque departed from the River Tyne for New York. No further trace, presumed foundered with the loss of all hands.
Nordlyset	Norway	The ship capsized in the Trondheim Fjord.
Prentiss	United States	The barque departed from South Shields, County Durham, England, for New London, Connecticut. Subsequently sighted off "Bona Island", but presumed to have sunk with the loss of all hands.

== 16 September ==
List of shipwrecks: 16 September 1858
Ship	State	Description
Beatitude	United Kingdom	The brig was run ashore at Falmouth, Cornwall with the loss of four of her six crew.
Eliza Ellen	United Kingdom	The schooner ran ashore at Coverack, Cornwall. Her crew were rescued. She was on a voyage from Newhaven, Sussex to Runcorn, Cheshire. She was later refloated and taken in to Falmouth. She had become a wreck by 22 September.
Robert and Helen	United Kingdom	The ship was driven ashore and wrecked on the Mull of Kintyre, Argyllshire.

== 17 September ==
List of shipwrecks: 17 September 1858
Ship	State	Description
Ada	(United Kingdom of Great Britain and Ireland) British North America	The brigantine was wrecked near Newport, Province of Canada, British North America. Her crew were rescued.
Colonel Cooke	United States	The schooner was wrecked near Newport, Province of Canada. All on board were rescued. She was on a voyage from Liverpool, Lancashire, United Kingdom to Detroit, Michigan.
Commerce	United Kingdom	The brig was driven ashore at Gourdon, Aberdeenshire. Her crew were rescued. She was on a voyage from Sunderland, County Durham to Tain, Ross-shire. She had become a wreck by 24 September.
Dwina	United Kingdom	The snow ran aground on the Lemon Sand, in the North Sea. She was on a voyage from "Tronkoping" to London. She was refloated and taken in to Lowestoft, Suffolk in a leaky condition.
Effort	Hudson's Bay Company	The ship departed from York Factory, Hudson's Bay for Quebec City, Province of Canada or the Bristol Channel. No further trace, presumed foundered with the loss of all hands.
Exhibition	United Kingdom	The smack sank near Fowey, Cornwall. Her crew were rescued. She was on a voyage from Falmouth, Cornwall to Plymouth, Devon.
Glencoe	United Kingdom	The brig was driven ashore and wrecked at Mullion, Cornwall. Her crew were rescued. She was on a voyage from Swansea, Glamorgan to Rouen, Seine-Inférieure, France.
John Craich	United Kingdom	The ship was driven ashore at Rattray Head, Aberdeenshire. Her crew were rescued. She was on a voyage from Newcastle upon Tyne, Northumberland to Inverness.
Julia	United Kingdom	The ship driven ashore in the Dardanelles.
Mary	United Kingdom	The schooner was driven ashore and wrecked at Mullion with the loss of one of her four crew. She was on a voyage from Bridgwater, Somerset to Shoreham-by-Sea, Sussex.
William	United Kingdom	The brig was run into by European (United Kingdom) and sank in the Thames Estuary. She was on a voyage from London to Swansea.

== 18 September ==
List of shipwrecks: 18 September 1858
Ship	State	Description
Abeona	United Kingdom	The sloop was abandoned in the Irish Sea. Her crew were rescued by the schooner Jewess (United Kingdom). She was on a voyage from Bangor, Caernarfonshire to Limerick.
Ariel	United States	The ship was driven ashore at Stone Point, Hampshire, United Kingdom. She was on a voyage from New York to Southampton, Hampshire, Havre de Grâce, Seine-Inférieure, France and Bremen. Ariel was refloated with the assistance of three tugs, including Echo (United Kingdom) and resumed her voyage, the next day.
Leith Packet	United Kingdom	The schooner was abandoned by her crew. She drove on to Little Skerry, in the Pentland Firth and was wrecked. She was on a voyage from Leith, Lothian to Stromness, Orkney Islands.
Thomas	United Kingdom	The schooner was driven ashore in Loch Indaal. She was refloated.
Union	United Kingdom	The ship was driven ashore on the Rabbit Islands, Ottoman Empire. She was on a voyage from Cardiff, Glamorgan to Theodosia, Russia. She had become a wreck by 30 September.
Vivandiere	United Kingdom	The ship was wrecked on the Pentland Skerries. All thirteen people on board were rescued. She was on a voyage from Leith to Stromness.

== 19 September ==
List of shipwrecks: 19 September 1858
Ship	State	Description
Halls	United Kingdom	The brigantine was wrecked in the Pentland Firth. Her crew were rescued. She was on a voyage from Liverpool, Lancashire to Apenrade, Norway.
Isabel	United Kingdom	The Mersey Flat was wrecked at Barmouth, Merionethshire. Her two crew were rescued by the Barmouth Lifeboat.
Mimosa	United Kingdom	The barque departed from Smyrna, Ottoman Empire for Boston, Lincolnshire. No further trace, presumed foundered with the loss of all thirteen crew.
Pelican State	United States	The ship was driven ashore in the Hillsborough Inlet. She was on a voyage from Liverpool, Lancashire, United Kingdom to New Orleans, Louisiana. Some of her crew left in a boat to seek assistance; they were picked up on 22 September by Thales (United States). Pelican State was refloated on 1 October and taken in to Key West, Florida.
Saltrens Rock	United Kingdom	The ship ran aground and was wrecked at Santa Ana, Cape Verde Islands. She was on a voyage from Saint Thomas, Virgin Islands to a British port.
Transit	United Kingdom	The schooner ran aground on Scroby Sands, Norfolk. She was on a voyage from Newcastle upon Tyne, Northumberland to Torquay, Devon.

== 20 September ==
List of shipwrecks: 20 September 1858
Ship	State	Description
Horus	France	The ship foundered east of Martinique. Her crew were rescued. She was on a voyage from Cette, Hérault to Martinique.
Isabella	United Kingdom	The ship was wrecked near Dartmouth, Devon. She was on a voyage from Liverpool, Lancashire to Dartmouth.
Tre Brodres	Sweden	The ship ran aground on the Longsand, in the North Sea off the coast of Essex, United Kingdom. She was on a voyage from Malmö to London, United Kingdom. She was refloated with the assistance of three smacks and assisted in to Harwich, Essex.

== 21 September ==
List of shipwrecks: 21 September 1858
Ship	State	Description
Aganita Adriana	Denmark	September Typhoon of 1858: The brig was wrecked in a typhoon at Swatow, China. She was captured by Chinese pirates but was recaptured. Her crew survived.
Alert	United Kingdom	September Typhoon of 1858: The ship was wrecked on the east coast of Formosa with the loss of twelve lives.
Alfred the Great	United Kingdom	September Typhoon of 1858: The full-rigged ship was driven ashore and severely damaged in a typhoon at Swatow. She was refloated but had to be beached and was consequently condemned.
Anonyma	United Kingdom	September Typhoon of 1858: The receiving ship, a brig, was wrecked at Swatow with the loss of a crew member.
Beverley	United Kingdom	September Typhoon of 1858: The barque was driven ashore in a typhoon at Swatow. She was later refloated.
Dennis Hill	United Kingdom	September Typhoon of 1858: The full-rigged ship was driven ashore and severely damaged in a typhoon at Swatow. She was later refloated.
Foam	United Kingdom	The barque was wrecked on the Bimbia Flats, off the coast of British Cameroons. She was on a voyage from Liverpool to Bonny, Africa.
Frederick William, or William Frederick	United Kingdom	September Typhoon of 1858: The barque was driven ashore and severely damaged in a typhoon at Swatow. She was later refloated and taken in to Hong Kong for repairs.
Gazelle	United Kingdom	September Typhoon of 1858: The schooner foundered in a typhoon at Swatow with the loss of seventeen of her crew.
Giovanni	Kingdom of Sardinia	September Typhoon of 1858: The brig was driven ashore and severely damaged in a typhoon at Swatow. She was later refloated.
Glendower	United Kingdom	September Typhoon of 1858: The full-rigged ship was driven ashore and wrecked in a typhoon at Swatow. She was later refloated and towed to Wampoa, China.
Harvest Home	United Kingdom	September Typhoon of 1858: The barque was driven ashore in a typhoon at Swatow. She was later refloated.
Hepscott	United Kingdom	September Typhoon of 1858: The barque was wrecked in a typhoon at Swatow.
Hong Kong	United Kingdom	September Typhoon of 1858: The receiving ship, a barque, was wrecked in a typhoon at Swatow.
Kinaldie	United Kingdom	September Typhoon of 1858: The full-rigged ship was wrecked in a typhoon at Swatow.
Laura	Grand Duchy of Oldenburg	September Typhoon of 1858: The brig was wrecked in a typhoon at Swatow.
Louisa	United Kingdom	September Typhoon of 1858: The barque was wrecked in a typhoon at Swatow.
Louisa Baillie	United Kingdom	September Typhoon of 1858: The barque was driven ashored and wrecked in a typhoon at Swatow.
Mazeppa	Unknown	September Typhoon of 1858: The clipper was wrecked .
Moulton	United Kingdom	September Typhoon of 1858: The barque was wrecked in a typhoon at Swatow.
Ohio	Bremen	September Typhoon of 1858: The barque was driven ashore and severely damaged in a typhoon at Swatow. She was later refloated and taken to Hong Kong for repairs.
Pantaloon	United Kingdom	September Typhoon of 1858: The brig was wrecked in a typhoon at Swatow. She was attacked and plundered two days later by Chinese pirates before being set afire. Her crew survived.
Thusnelde	Denmark	September Typhoon of 1858: The barque was wrecked in a typhoon at Swatow.

== 22 September ==
List of shipwrecks: 22 September 1858
Ship	State	Description
Anna Charlotte	Sweden	The ship was wrecked on the Haisborough Sands, in the North Sea off the coast of Norfolk, United Kingdom. Her crew were rescued. She was on a voyage from Gothenburg to London, United Kingdom.
Friendship	United Kingdom	The ship abandoned off the coast of Cardiganshire and sank.

== 23 September ==
List of shipwrecks: 23 September 1858
Ship	State	Description
Cashagney	United States	The barque was destroyed by fire at Matagorda, Texas.
Cashanga	United Kingdom	The ship destroyed by fire at Cádiz, Spain. Her crew were rescued.
Hope	United Kingdom	The ship driven ashore at Ayr. She was on a voyage from Drogheda, County Louth to Ayr. She was refloated on 25 September and taken in to Ayr.
Sarah	(United Kingdom of Great Britain and Ireland) British North America	The ship was wrecked at St. Roch, Province of Canada. She was on a voyage from Newfoundland to Quebec City, Province of Canada.

== 24 September ==
List of shipwrecks: 24 September 1858
Ship	State	Description
Diana	United Kingdom	The schooner sprang a leak and foundered off Inchkeith, Fife. Her crew survived. She was on a voyage from Burntisland, Fife to Newcastle upon Tyne, Northumberland.
Hugh Charles Bowden	United Kingdom	The schooner was driven ashore at Ballyferris Point, County Down. She was on a voyage from Wick, Caithness to Cork. She was refloated and taken in to Donaghadee, County Down.
Northern Maid	United Kingdom	The schooner was wrecked on the Burbo Bank, in Liverpool Bay. Her crew were rescued by the tug Uncle Sam (United Kingdom).
Pindarves	United Kingdom	The schooner ran aground on the Holme Sand, in the North Sea off the coast of Suffolk. She was on a voyage from South Shields, County Durham to Exmouth, Devon.
Premium	United Kingdom	The ship driven ashore south of Scarborough, Yorkshire. She was refloated and put in to Scarborough in a leaky condition.
Union	United Kingdom	The schooner went ashore departing Rosehearty, Aberdeenshire. She was on a voyage from there to Stettin with herring.

== 25 September ==
List of shipwrecks: 25 September 1858
Ship	State	Description
Abyssinia	United Kingdom	The ship departed from Demerara, British Guiana for a British port. No further trace, presumed foundered with the loss of all hands.
Argonaut	United Kingdom	The brig sprang a leak and sank in the North Sea 9 nautical miles (17 km) north of the Dudgeon Lightship ( Trinity House). Her crew were rescued by the brig Lorimer (United Kingdom). Argonaut was on a voyage from South Shields, County Durham to Rotterdam, South Holland, Netherlands.
Invincible	United Kingdom	The steamship sank off Hogland, Russia. Her crew were rescued by a French steamship. She was on a voyage from Kronstadt, Russia to Stockholm, Sweden.
Marie	France	The ship was struck the Hornet Rocks, off the coast of Seine-Inférieure and sank. Her crew were rescued. She was on a voyage from Seaham, County Durham to Saint-Malo, Ille-et-Vilaine.
Nautilus	United Kingdom	The ship sprang a leak off the mouth of the Humber. She was on a voyage from Blyth, Northumberland to Dieppe, Seine-Inférieure. She was assisted in to Great Yarmouth, Norfolk in a sinking condition.
Oliver Lang	(United Kingdom of Great Britain and Ireland) New Zealand	The clipper ship left Plymouth for Wellington in June 1858, arriving in New Zealand in mid-September, carrying some 300 passengers. En route, she had collided with the Hamburg-registered barque Shan, and both vessels had sustained damage. Shortly after arriving at Wellington Harbour, a strong wind sprang up, and the Oliver Lang was driven on shore, apparently due to negligent handling. She was refloated, but a few days later, on September 25, a heavy gale drove her onto Te Aro beach, by which point she was totally wrecked.
Sultan	(United Kingdom of Great Britain and Ireland) Jersey	The ship ran aground on the Goodwin Sands, Kent. She was refloated with assistance from the Ramsgate Lifeboat and taken in to Ramsgate, Kent.

== 26 September ==
List of shipwrecks: 26 September 1858
Ship	State	Description
Avon	United Kingdom	The brig was wrecked on Anholt, Denmark. She was on a voyage from Newport, Monmouthshire to Riga, Russia.
Sultana	United Kingdom	The ship ran aground on the Goodwin Sands, Kent. She was on a voyage from Seaham, County Durham to Jersey, Channel Islands. She was refloated and taken in to Ramsgate, Kent in a leaky condition.
Ulysee	Sweden	The brig was abandoned in the Kattegat. Her crew were rescued by the schooner Banffshire (United Kingdom).

== 27 September ==
List of shipwrecks: 27 September 1858
Ship	State	Description
Diana	United Kingdom	The brig was driven ashore and wrecked at Cabrita Point, Spain. Her crew were rescued. She was on a voyage from Marseille, Bouches-du-Rhône, France to Falmouth, Cornwall.
Indian Queen	United Kingdom	The ship was driven ashore at "Escabelus". She broke up the next day.
North American	United Kingdom	The steamship struck a sunken rock (50°00′N 60°40′W) and was severely damaged, sinking at the bows. She was on a voyage from Quebec City, Province of Canada, British North America to Liverpool, Lancashire. She completed her voyage.
Pauline et Victoire	France	The barque ran aground in the Torres Straits. She was refloated and anchored 4 nautical miles (7.4 km) north of Mulgrave Island, New South Wales. She was attacked by the local inhabitants the next day and was abandoned. Her crew reached Timor Koepang, Netherlands East Indies in their boat on 11 October.
Richard Grainger	United Kingdom	The brig was driven ashore at Greyhope, Aberdeen and was severely damaged. She was on a voyage from Newcastle upon Tyne, Northumberland to Aberdeen. She was refloated and taken in to Aberdeen.

== 28 September ==
List of shipwrecks: 28 September 1858
Ship	State	Description
Norden	United Kingdom	The ship ran aground in the Tonalá River.
Pollock	United Kingdom	The ship departed from Alexandria, Egypt for Liverpool, Lancashire. No further trace, presumed foundered with the loss of all hands.
Wilhelmine	Denmark	The ship was driven ashore on the west coast of Denmark. She was on a voyage from Hull, Yorkshire, United Kingdom to "Christinested". She had become a wreck by 5 October.

== 29 September ==
List of shipwrecks: 29 September 1858
Ship	State	Description
Antje	Netherlands	The schooner was abandoned in the Atlantic Ocean. Her crew were rescued by N. H. Gould (United States). Antje was on a voyage from Havana, Cuba to Amsterdam, North Holland.
Cordova	United Kingdom	The ship was wrecked between Trondheim and Christiansand, Norway. Her crew were rescued. She was on a voyage from Arkhangelsk, Russia to London.
Hazard	United Kingdom	The brig foundered 15 nautical miles (28 km) off Worms Head, Glamorgan. Her four crew survived. She was on a voyage from Newport, Monmouthshire to Liverpool, Lancashire.

== 30 September ==
List of shipwrecks: 30 September 1858
Ship	State	Description
Albion	United Kingdom	The ship was driven ashore at "St. Valine", Province of Canada, British North America. She was on a voyage from Bermuda to Quebec City, Province of Canada.
Anna Elizabeth	United Kingdom	The ship foundered in the North Sea. Her crew were rescued. She was on a voyage from Newcastle upon Tyne, Northumberland to Saint Petersburg, Russia.
Antze	Netherlands	The schooner foundered in the Atlantic Ocean. Her crew were rescued by N. and H. Gould (United States). Antze was on a voyage from Havana, Cuba to Amsterdam, North Holland.
St. Paul	United Kingdom	The ship was wrecked on Rossel Island. Nine crew took a boat to seek assistance and were rescued on 15 October by the schooner Prince of Denmark (Flag unknown). The aviso Styx (French Navy) was dispatched from New Caledonia to rescue the survivors, but only managed to rescued one survivor from the remainder of her crew and 327 passengers. Three other survivors were held captive. The rest had been murdered by the local inhabitants. St. Paul was on a voyage from Hong Kong to Sydney, New South Wales. Two survivors escaped custody in 1865 and managed to stow themselves on the schooner Blue Bell ( (United Kingdom of Great Britain and Ireland) Western Australia). They were taken to Port Albany, Western Australia. A third survivor was rescued from Night Island, Queensland in 1875 by the schooner John Bell (South Australia).

== Unknown date ==
List of shipwrecks: Unknown date in September 1858
Ship	State	Description
Alexander II	Russia	The steamship was driven ashore at "Kopitz". She was on a voyage from a Russian port to Stettin.
Amaranth	United Kingdom	The ship departed from Cuxhaven for the River Tyne in mid-September. No further trace, presumed foundered with the loss of all twelve people on board.
American	United Kingdom	The ship driven ashore near "Apsos". She was on a voyage from Kronstadt, Russia to Liverpool, Lancashire.
Constant	Belgium	The full-rigged ship was wrecked on a reef off James Island, in the Pacific Ocean (7°40′N 155°30′E).
Curraghmore	United Kingdom	The ship ran aground on the Almedine Reef, off the south coast of Spain. She was refloated and taken in to Cádiz, where she arrived on 7 September.
D. L. Choate	United States	The ship driven ashore and damaged at Saint George, New Brunswick, British North America. She was later refloated and taken in to Eastport, Maine, where she arrived on 10 September.
Ellen Jenkinson	United Kingdom	The brig was wrecked at Cape Palmas, Liberia before 14 September.
Fame	United Kingdom	The brig was wrecked on the Shipwash Sand, in the North Sea off the coast of Suffolk. Her crew were rescued by John and William (United Kingdom).
Denmark	Flag unknown	The ship was abandoned in the Atlantic Ocean off Bermuda before 10 March. Her crew survived. She was on a voyage from Rio de Janeiro, Brazil to Saint John's.
Haidee	United States	The clipper was scuttled off Montauk, New York.
Henry Porcher	United Kingdom	The barque ran aground and was wrecked near Thurso, Province of Canada, British North America after her captain committed suicide. She was on a voyage from Quebec City, Province of Canada to Grangemouth, Stirlingshire.
Hippolyte	France	The brig was capsized by a whirlwind between Algeciras, Spain and Gibraltar with the loss of two of her crew.
Imperial	United Kingdom	The ship driven ashore and wrecked at Métis, Province of Canada. She was on a voyage from Liverpool to Quebec City.
Neophyte	United Kingdom	The ship wrecked at the mouth of the Rio Pongas with the loss of her captain. She was on a voyage from Sierra Leone to Liverpool.
Neptune	Prussia	The barque was driven ashore on Gorgona Island, Granadine Confederation before 11 September. She was on a voyage from Panama City, Granadine Confederation to the Chincha Islands, Peru. She was refloated and taken in to Guayaquil, Ecuador.
Port Jackson	United Kingdom	The ship was wrecked in the "Banshee Islands" with some loss of life. She was on a voyage from Hong Kong to the "Banshee Islands".
Warrior	United Kingdom	The ship ran aground whilst on a voyage from Quebec City to Sunderland. She was refloated and resumed her voyage, but put in to Lerwick, Shetland Islands in a leaky condition on 28 September.
