= Blake Morgan LLP =

British commercial law firm

- Headquarters: Southampton, United Kingdom
- No. of offices: 6
- No. of lawyers: Approx. 530
- No. of employees: Approx. 1000
- Major practice areas: Full-service
- Key people: Mike Wilson (Managing Partner); Helen Bunker(Chair); Matt Clarke (Chief Financial Officer)
- Company type: Limited Liability Partnership
- Website: Blake Morgan LLP

Blake Morgan LLP is a large full-service commercial law firm with offices in Cardiff, London, Manchester, Oxford, Reading and Southampton in the United Kingdom. It was formed in 2014 following a merger between the Cardiff-based Morgan Cole and the Portsmouth-based Blake Lapthorn. It employs approximately 415 lawyers and 145 other fee-earners. It has 130 partners. It is registered with the Law Society of England and Wales.

Blake Cole was formed by the merger of Morgan Bruce and Cole & Cole in 1998.

== Historyi ==
=== Cole and Cole ===
Cole & Cole was formed in Oxford in 1945 by two brothers, Raymond Buxton Cole and Maurice Buxton Cole and quickly spread throughout Oxfordshire partly by the opening of new offices and partly by merger. In particular the Abingdon practice of Morland & Son was acquired in 1951 which traced its history back to 1784. Benjamin Morland who started work as a clerk in 1784 was a member of the Morland brewing family.

This acquisition was followed by the acquisition of Soanes & Co, in Burford in 1966 and the firm of Francis Wickins & Hill in Stow-on-the-Wold in 1982.

Most of the expansion of the firm resulted from sustained growth within Oxford which led to the opening of a dedicated commercial department in Kidlington in 1984, a specialist matrimonial, crown and magistrates court department in Cambridge Terrace, Oxford and a commercial and litigation office in Reading in 1987. In addition, a Croydon insurance litigation office opened in 1997.

At the time of the merger with Morgan Bruce, Cole & Cole was the pre-eminent firm in the Thames Valley with 35 partners and a staff of over 200.

=== Morgan Bruce ===
Morgan Bruce grew by a series of five mergers from its initial opening in 1836. The first merger was in May 1987 when Morgan Bruce & Nicholas joined forces with Hardwickes.

==== Morgan Bruce & Nicholas ====
The firm of Morgan Bruce & Nicholas originated with Walter H Morgan who became a solicitor in 1875, established a practice in Pontypridd the following year and opened the premises which remained an office of the firm until 1995.

Walter Morgan (1853–1901) was prominent in public life becoming an Alderman, Under-Sheriff and a Vice-Chairman of Glamorgan County Council.

After a few years as Walter Morgan & Rhys the firm's name was changed to Walter Morgan, Bruce & Nicholas following the arrival of Gerald Bruce who qualified in 1893 and Walter Nicholas who qualified in 1894.

Sir Gerald Bruce (as he became) was a well-known figure in South Wales over decades and included in his many achievements chairmanship of Wales and Monmouthshire Industrial Estates Ltd, an organisation which contributed significantly to the economic recovery of Wales following the depression of the thirties. Sir Gerald was Lord Lieutenant of the County of Glamorgan from 1943 to 1952.

Sir Walter Nicholas also achieved eminence and was knighted for his services to local government administration. He was directly concerned with the promotion of local and private Acts of Parliament and served as a part-time Clerk of Rhondda Urban District Council. He made a significant contribution to the development of statute law relating to workmen's compensation.

After further brief periods as Morgan, Bruce, Nicholas and James and Morgan, Bruce, Nicholas and Porcher the name Morgan, Bruce & Nicholas finally emerged shortly after the First World War and remained unchanged until merger. During the first 87 years of its existence the firm was centred in Pontypridd, but in 1963 a decision was taken to establish an office in Cardiff.

==== Hardwickes ====
This firm started in Cardiff in 1910 and was a litigation firm acting for a number of insurance clients and the Solicitors Indemnity Fund. The merger created a firm with 23 partners.

=== Morgan Cole ===
In February 2010 the firm transferred from a partnership to a Limited Liability Partnership (LLP).

January 2009 saw the merger with CIP Solicitors of Bristol and later that year the acquisition of the majority of the insurance team from rival firm Leo Abse and Cohen. This followed the acquisition in 2008 of Bristol-based insurance specialist CIP Solicitors and the transfer of a 10-strong team of Insurance specialists from Gloucester-based firm Tayntons.

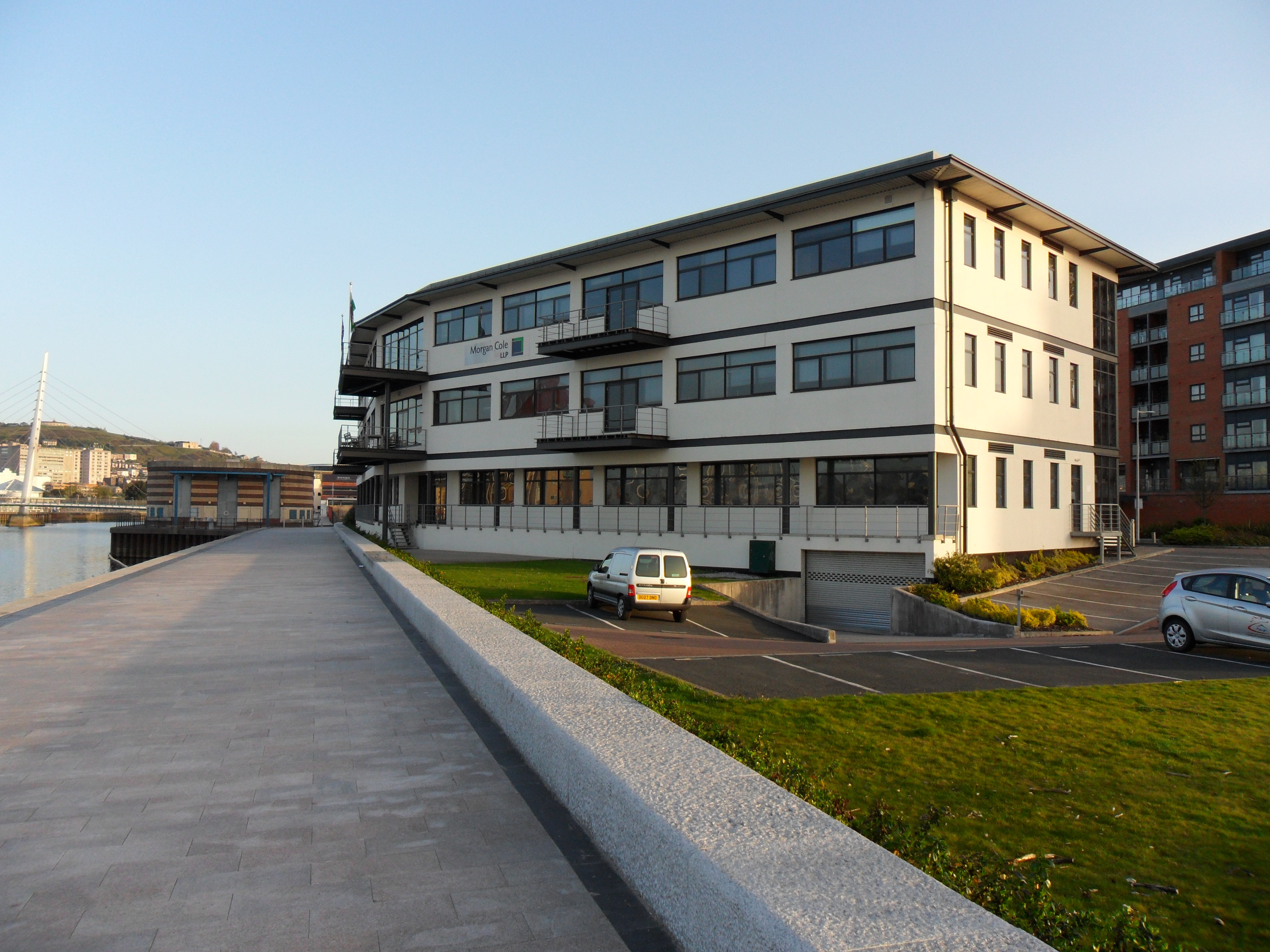
Morgan Cole's offices in Swansea's SA1 development

A Bristol office opened in 2007.

In 2003, the firm moved into its new 24,000 sq ft (2,200 m^{2}) offices in Swansea – the first private sector investment in the development at SA1 Swansea Waterfront. In the same year, Robin Havard became chairman of the firm and was re-elected for a third three-year term in 2009.

Bruce Potter chaired the firm's board, which comprised Elizabeth Carr (Managing Partner), Catharine Bray (Finance Director), Michael Prior (Commercial Director), and Michael Stace and Philip Jardine, both partners at the firm.

=== Blake Lapthorn ===
Blake Lapthorn was a full-service law firm now operating under the name of Blake Morgan LLP. The firm worked for individuals, businesses, not-for-profit and government clients. Founded in 1869 by Alfred Starling Blake, the firm originated in Portsmouth, Hampshire, and expanded with offices in Southampton, Reading, London, Oxford and Cardiff.

== Source for Blake Lapthorn ==
- Private Notes: Hubert Glyn Williams, The History of Blake Lapthorn Solicitors
- Portsmouth City Council, Lord Mayors of Portsmouth since 1927
- History in Portsmouth, Alfred Starling Blake
- Who's Who, Blake, Sir Alfred (Lapthorn)
- The Law Society Gazette, "Blake Lapthorn and Linnells create new 79-partner firm" (21 March 2003)
- The Lawyer, "Blake Lapthorn partners vote to save City office" (16 October 2006)
