= List of Air Training Corps squadrons =

The Air Training Corps (ATC) is a cadet organisation based in the United Kingdom. It is a voluntary youth group which is part of the Royal Air Force Air Cadets. The ATC is largely composed of individual units known as squadrons. These squadrons are organised into several different wings, which in turn are organised into six different regions. Together the regions make up the corps.

Headquarters air cadets (HQAC) is located at Royal Air Force College Cranwell, Lincolnshire and headed by Commandant Air Cadets Air Commodore Allen Lewis.

== Founder squadrons and detached flights ==
The first 50 squadrons formed have their squadron numbers followed by an F to show they are "founder" squadrons (e.g. No 2F(Watford) Squadron). Only 29 are still in existence, as the other 21 have disbanded over time. Founder squadrons that have reformed after being disbanded do not retain the F status, such as XIX (19) Crawley .

In towns not large enough to sustain a squadron of 30 cadets, or as a supplement to an existing squadron in a larger town or city, a detached flight may be formed. This operates much like any other unit, but is technically a component part of a nearby larger squadron. There are currently approximately 48 detached flights, denoted by the letters "DF" after a squadron number.

== Central & east region ==
Region HQ RAF Wyton

=== Bedfordshire & Cambridgeshire wing ===
Wing HQ RAF Wyton

- 10F (Luton)
- 22 (Sandy)
- 51 (Orton)
- 73 (Huntingdon)
- 104 (City of Cambridge)
- 105 (Cambourne)
- 115 (Peterborough)
- 134 (Bedford)
- 207 (Cranfield)
- 272 (Wisbech)
- 460 (Dunstable)
- 511 (Ramsey)
- 1003 (Leighton Buzzard)
- 1094 (Ely)
- 1220 (March)
- 1451 (Haverhill)
- 1985 (Flitwick)
- 2065 (Biggleswade)
- 2331 (St Ives)
- 2417 (Newmarket)
- 2461 (Sawston)
- 2462 (Oakley)
- 2465 (Luton Icknield)
- 2482 (Henlow)
- 2484 (Bassingbourn)
- 2500 (St Neots)
- 2524 (Oakington)

Previous

- 2523 (Linton) (DISBANDED)

=== Hertfordshire wing ===
Wing HQ RAF Halton

- 2F (Watford)
- 57 (Potters Bar)
- 220 (St Albans)
- 248 (Letchworth)
- 795 (Harpenden)
- 936 (Hertford & Ware)
- 955 (Stevenage)
- 1066 (Hitchin)
- 1166 (Welwyn Garden City)
- 1187 (Hemel Hempstead)
- 1239 (Broxbourne & Hoddesdon)
- 1372 (Elstree & Borehamwood)
- 2203 (Hatfield & de Havilland)
- 2313 (Rickmansworth and Chalfont)
- 2384 (Bushey & Oxhey)
- 2457 (Tring)

=== Norfolk & Suffolk wing ===
Wing HQ Norwich

- 2 Overseas (Gibraltar)
- 42F (Kings Lynn)
- 188 (Ipswich)
- 221 (Great Yarmouth)
- 222 (Broadlands)
- 231 (Norwich)
- 301 (Bury St Edmunds)
  301DF (Culford School) - disbanded
- 356 (Felixstowe)
- 432 (Woodbridge)
- 469 (Lowestoft)
- 759 (Beccles)
- 863 (Thurston)
- 864 (Watton)
  864DF (Marham) - disbanded
- 1018 (Downham Market)
- 1070 (Diss)
- 1109 (Thetford)
- 1132 (Stalham) - disbanded
- 1249 (Dereham)
- 1287 (Wattisham) - disbanded
- 1331 (Stowmarket)
- 1334 (Manningtree)
- 1379 (Leiston)
- 1894 (Swaffham) - disbanded
- 1895 (Cromer)
- 1986 (Wymondham)
- 2110 (North Walsham)
- 2356 (Caister) - disbanded
- 2470 (Sudbury)
- 2534 (Fakenham)

=== South & East Midlands wing ===
Wing HQ RAF Wittering

- 1F ( Leicester)
- 5F (Northampton)
- 51 (Evington) - disbanded
- 126 (City of Derby)
- 138 (1st Nottingham)
- 198 (Hinckley)
- 209 (West Bridgford)
- 348 (Ilkeston)
- 378 (Mannock) named in honour of Mick Mannock WW1 Fighter Ace
- 422 (Corby)
- 504 (West Nottingham)
- 858 (Rushden)
- 1084 (Market Harborough)
- 1101 (Kettering)
- 1181 (Syston) - disbanded
- 1188 (Coalville)
- 1211 (Swadlincote)
- 1279 (Melton Mowbray)
- 1359 (Beeston)
- 1360 (Stapleford & Sandiacre)
- 1461 (Wigston)
- 1936 (Newton)
- 1947 (Birstall)
- 2070 (Glenfield)
- 2071 (Stamford)
- 2195 (Long Eaton)
- 2229 (Loughborough)
- 2248 (Rutland)
- 2418 (Sherwood)
- 2425 (Nottingham Airport)
- 2502 (Hamilton)
- 2600 (Rothwell, Northamptonshire) [Formerly 1084DF] - disbanded
- 2792 (Charlie flight) - temporary

=== Trent Wing ===
Wing HQ RAF Digby

- 17 (Coningsby)
- 47F (Grantham)
- 140 (Matlock)
- 141 (Boston)
- 203 (Gainsborough)
- 204 (City of Lincoln)
- 303 (Worksop)
- 331 (Chesterfield)
- 384 (Mansfield)
- 620 (Derwent Valley)
- 1073 (Skegness)
- 1082 (Brimington & District) - disbanded
- 1208 (Warsop)
- 1228 (Louth)
- 1228DF (Mablethorpe) - disbanded
- 1237 (North Hykeham)
- 1260 (Newark & District)
- 1265 (Horncastle)
- 1300 (Sutton-in-Ashfield)
- 1401 (Alfreton & Ripley)
- 1403 (Retford)
- 1406 (Spalding)
- 1803 (Hucknall)
- 1890 (Dronfield)
- 2000 (Eckington)
- 2160 (Sleaford)
- 2292 (Market Rasen)
- 2326 (Clay Cross)
- 2430 (Holbeach)

=== Essex wing ===
Wing HQ RFCA Chelmsford

- 106 (Orsett Hundred)
- 158 (Braintree & District)
- 276 (Chelmsford)
- 295 (Witham & Rivenhall)
- 308 (City of Colchester)
- 309 (Sawbridgeworth)
- 414 (Epping & North Weald)
- 494 (Stansted Airport) - disbanded
- 999 (Dunmow & District)
- 1096 (Bishops Stortford)
- 1163 (Colne Valley) - Temporarily Disbanded
- 1207 (Maldon)
- 1312 (Southend)
- 1341 (Thundersley)
- 1474 (Wickford)
- 1476 (Rayleigh)
- 1483 (Brentwood)
- 1582 (Stanford-le-Hope)
- 1824 (Saffron Walden)
- 1830 (Tendring Hundred)
- 2187 (Canvey Island)
- 2243 (Basildon)
- 2317 (Harlow)
- 2393 (Billericay)
- 2476 (Hutton)
- 2531 (Woodham Ferrers)
- 2531DF (Burnham-on-Crouch)

== London & South East region ==
Region HQ RAF Northolt

=== Kent wing ===
Wing HQ Maidstone

- 25 (Parkwood)
- 40F (Maidstone)
- 74 (Crayford) formally 74 (Dartford District) - Disbanded
- 99 (Folkestone)
- 129 (Royal Tunbridge Wells)
- 173 (Orpington)
- 213 (City of Rochester)
- 228 (Bromley)
- 305 (Ashford)
- 312 (City of Canterbury)
- 340 (Edenbridge) disbanded
- 354 (Dover)
- 358 (Welling)
- 359 (Bexleyheath)
- 402 (Gravesend)
- 438 (Thanet) - disbanded/merged with 2433 (Ramsgate & Manston)
- 500 (Headcorn)
- 578 (Langley Park) - Disbanded
- 593 (Swanley)
- 768 (Hayes School) - Disbanded
- 1039 (Gillingham)
- 1051 (Dartford)
- 1063 (Herne Bay)
- 1227 (Sidcup)
- 1257 (Erith, Technical High School) - Disbanded
- 1242 (Faversham)
- 1404 (Chatham)
- 1579 (Leigh Academy Bexley)
- 1903 (Penge)
- 2158 (Sevenoaks)
- 2230 (Sittingbourne)
- 2235 (Deal)
- 2316 (Sheppey)
- 2374 (Ditton)
- 2427 (Biggin Hill)
- 2433 (Thanet)
- 2511 (Longfield) - became 402DF - Disbanded
- 2513 (Romney Marsh)
- 2520 (Tonbridge)

=== London wing ===
Wing HQ (shared London, Middlesex, Surrey WHQ)

- 4 Overseas (Gutersloh) Disbanded
- 4F (Ilford) Disbanded 2026
- 6F (Romford)
- 8 Overseas (Rheindahlen) Disbanded
- 9F (Islington)
- 12F (Walthamstow & Leyton)
- 14F (Northolt)
- 21F (Lewisham) -disbanded
- 27F (Chingford)
- 31 (Tower Hamlets) (formally 444DF)
- 33F (Battersea)
- 34F (Balham & Tooting)
- 46F (Kensington)
- 48F (Hampstead)
- 50F (Camberwell & Lambeth)
- 53 (Hackney) - disbanded
- 56 (Woolwich)
- 64 (Paddington) - disbanded
- 69 (Aske's School) - disbanded
- 82 (Wandsworth)
- 88 (St Pancras) - disbanded
- 92 (Borough of Woolwich) - disbanded
- 98 (Marylebone) - disbanded
- 241 (Wanstead & Woodford)
- 256 (2nd Battersea) - disbanded
- 282 (East Ham)
- 291 (Westminster & Chelsea)
- 296 (Stoke Newington)
- 329 (Finsbury)
- 336 (Hammersmith) - disbanded
- 338 (West Ham)
- 343 (Camberwell) - disbanded/merged with 50F (Lambeth)
- 344 (Fulham)
- 409 (Bermondsey & Southwark) - disbanded
- 416 (Bethnal Green) - disbanded
- 444 (Shoreditch) - disbanded
- 452 (Hornchurch)
- 962 (Stratford Grammar School) - disbanded
- 1107 (Leytonstone) - disbanded/merged with 12F
- 1147 (Barking)
- 1351 (Clapham) - disbanded
- 1352 (Putney) - disbanded
- 1353 (Streatham) - disbanded
- 1475 (Dulwich)
- 1838 (Elm Park)
- 1921 (Lewisham)
- 1995 (Borough of Poplar) - disbanded
- 2048 (Dagenham)
- 2060 (2nd Shoreditch) - disbanded
- 2324 (Chigwell)

=== Middlesex wing ===
Wing HQ RAF Northolt (Originally Uxbridge)

- 14F (Northolt) (Originally Uxbridge)
- 16F (Wood Green & Hornsey)(Originally Wood Green)
- 78 (Wembley)
- 85 (Enfield & Southgate)
- 85DF (Enfield Town) (Disbanded)
- 86 (Heston & Isleworth)
- 94 (Feltham)
- 101 (Kenton & Kingsbury) (Originally Harrow)
- 114 (Ruislip & Northwood)
- CXX - 120 (Hendon)
- 267 (Twickenham)
- 268 (Tottenham)
- 342 (Ealing & Brentford) (formed from 1413 (No1 Ealing), 342 (No2 Ealing) and 2043 (Brentford))
- 393 (Finchley)
- 398 (Staines & Egham)
- 406 (Willesden)
- 862 (Sunbury)
- 1083 (Uxbridge) (formerly Hayes & Harlington)
- 1159 (Edmonton)
- 1374 (East Barnet)
- 1381 (West Drayton & Yiewsley)
- 1454 (Harrow) (Originally South Harrow)
- 1571 (Aylward) (Disbanded)
- 1846 (Southall)
- 2236 (Stanmore)
- 2473 (Highlands & Southgate) (Disbanded)

=== Surrey wing ===
Wing HQ (merged WHQ with London & Middlesex)

- 11F (Brooklands)
- 18F (Wimbledon)
- 39F (Barnes & Richmond)
- 43F (Mitcham & Morden)
- 66 (Croydon)
- 135 (Reigate & Redhill)
- 180 (Cranleigh) - Formerly 1254DF
- 219 (Sutton & Cheam)
- 229 (Farnham)
- 261 (Guildford)
- 285 (Coulsdon & Purley)
- 323 (Epsom & Ewell)
- 328 (Kingston upon Thames)
- 350 (Carshalton & Wallington)
- 450 (Kenley)
- 1034 (Surbiton & Esher)
- 1075 (Camberley)
- 1254 (Godalming)
- 1268 (Haslemere)
- 1349 (Woking)
- 1408 (Dorking)
- 1924 (Shirley)

=== Sussex wing ===
Wing HQ Eastbourne

- XIX - 19 (Crawley)
- 45F (Worthing)
- 54 (Eastbourne)
- 88 (Battle) - Formerly 304 DF
- 172 (Haywards Heath)
- 176 (Hove)
- 225 (Brighton No 1)
- 226 (Brighton No 2)
- 249 (Hailsham)
- 304 (Hastings)
- 461 (Chichester)
- 1015 (Horsham)
- 1087 (Arun Valley)
- 1140 (Steyning) - Formerly 1440DF
- 1218 (Newhaven) - Disbanded 2017
- 1343 (East Grinstead)
- 1414 (Crowborough)
- 1440 (Shoreham)
- 2262 (Bexhill)
- 2278 (Knoll School) - Disbanded/ Merged with 176 (Hove)
- 2351 (Bognor Regis)
- 2464 (Storrington)
- 2529 (Burgess Hill) - Formerly 225DF
- 2530 (Uckfield)

== North region ==
Region HQ RAF Leeming

=== Central & East Yorkshire wing ===
Wing HQ RAF Leeming

- 35 (Wetherby)
- 58 (Harrogate)
- 110 (City of York)
- 119 (Scunthorpe)
- 152 (City of Hull)
- 195 (Grimsby)
- 252 (Bridlington)
- 264 (Skipton)
- 266 (Stockton)
- 298 (Hornsea)
- 399 (Beverley)
- 405 (Darlington)
- 739 (Scarborough)
- 740 (Whitby)
- 866 (Immingham)
- 872 (Hull West) - Disbanded 2022
- 873 (Driffield)
- 886 (City of Ripon)
- 1224 (Wharfedale)
- 1261 (Thornaby) disbanded
- 1323 (Ryedale)
- 1324 (Hawker Blackburn)
- 1869 (Middlesbrough)
- 1953 (Knaresborough)
- 2040 (Richmond)
- 2168 (Yeadon)
- 2222 (Brigg)
- 2337 (Northallerton)
- 2394 (East Cleveland)
- 2431 (Keighley)
- 2434 (Church Fenton)
- 2487 (Easingwold)
- 2487DF (RAF Linton-on-Ouse)
  [formerly 110 DF] - disbanded
- 2527 (Lawnswood)

=== Cumbria & Lancashire wing ===
Formerly Cumbria and North Lancashire wing, merged with East Lancashire wing in 2011
Wing HQ Inskip

- 92 (Chorley)
- 128 (Barrow in Furness)
- 143 (Longridge) - formerly 341DF
- 177 (Blackpool Airport)
- 206 (Thornton Cleveleys)
- 341 (City of Preston)
- 345 (City of Lancaster)
- 352 (Burnley)
- 455 (Morecambe & Heysham)
- 471 (Hesketh Bank & Tarleton)
- 723 (Wigan)
- 967 (British Aerospace Warton)
- 1030 (Whitehaven)
- 1035 (Accrington & District)
- 1104 (Pendle)
- 1127 (Kendal)
- 1247 (Penrith)
- 1262 (Blackburn)
- 1264 (Windermere)
  1264DF (Millom) - Disbanded 2018
- 1301 (Fleetwood)
- 1471 (Horwich)
- 1862 (City of Carlisle)
- 1969 (Rossendale)
- 2050 (Leyland)
- 2192 (Appleby Grammar School)
- 2199 (Workington)
- 2223 (Ulverston)
- 2246 (Carnforth)
- 2376 (Bamber Bridge) - Formerly 2050DF
- 2454 (Blackpool)
- 2459 (Poulton-le-Fylde)
- 2486 (Lytham St Annes) - Disbanded 2019

=== Durham & Northumberland wing ===
Wing HQ Knightsbridge, Gosforth, Newcastle upon Tyne

- 36 (Hetton-le-Hole)
- 111 (Sunderland)
- 131 (City of Newcastle)
- 224 (Hexham)
- 234 (City of Durham)
- 242 (Cramlington)
- 324 (South Shields)
- 346 (Tynemouth)
- 361 (Gateshead)
- 404 (Morpeth)
- 473 (Hartlepool)
- 607 (Wearmouth) formerly 111 DF
- 733 (Newcastle Airport)
- 861 (Wideopen)
- 1000 (Blyth)
- 1016 (Berwick)
- 1027 (Jarrow)
- 1110 (Ashington (Disbanded Mid 2023))
- 1114 (Gosforth)
- 1151 (Wallsend)
- 1156 (Whitley Bay)
- 1248 (Prudhoe)
- 1313 (Whickham)
- 1338 (Seaham)
- 1407 (Newton Aycliffe) formerly 2505 DF
- 1409 (Consett)
- 1507 (Chester-le-Street)
- 1509 (Blaydon)
- 1801 (Alnwick)
- 1932 (Blackhall)
- 2214 (Usworth)
- 2344 (Longbenton)
- 2505 (Bishop Auckland)
- 2510 (West Denton)
- 2522 (Bedlington)

=== Greater Manchester wing ===
Wing HQ 247 (Ashton-Under-Lyne)

- 55 (Woodford & Bramhall)
- 70 (Croft and Culcheth)
- 80 (Bolton)
- 95 (Crewe)
- 100 (Nantwich)
- 145 (Altrincham & Hale)
- 162 (Stockport)
- 182 (North Trafford)
- 184 (City of Manchester)
- 201 (Macclesfield)
- 230 (Congleton)
- 236 (Bollington)
- 247 (Ashton-Under-Lyne)
- 284 (Cheadle & Gatley)
- 316 (Leigh) (Formally 969 St Helens DF)
- 317 (Failsworth & Newton Heath)
- 318 (Sale)
- 391 (Wilmslow)
- 468 (Hyde & Hattersley) ((disbanded pre 2020))
- 617 (Heber)
- 1005 (Radcliffe)
- 1036 (Bury)
- 1099 (Worsley)
- 1196 (Bredbury, Romiley & Marple)
- 1263 (Rochdale)
- 1330 (Warrington)
- 1804 (Four Heatons)(closed pre 2020)
- 1832 (North Manchester)(disbanded)
- 1855 (Royton)
- 1873 (Sandbach)
- 1938 (Salford City & Eccles)
- 2056 (Knutsford)
- 2137 (Lymm)
- 2200 (Oldham)
  2200DF (Saddleworth) (( closed never reopened after covid))
- 2301 (Heywood)
- 2468 (Belle Vue)
- 2493 (Alsager)

=== Merseyside wing ===
Wing HQ RAF Woodvale

- 7F (1st City of Liverpool)
- 90 (Speke)
- 146 (Northwich)
- 273 (Wallasey)
- 281 (Southport)
- 310 (Widnes)
- 400 (Birkenhead)
- 440 (1st Manx)
- 472 (Hoylake)
- 610 (City of Chester)
- 611 (Woodvale)
- 969 (St Helens)
- 1026 (Ormskirk)
- 1074 (Ellesmere Port)
- 1123 (Hooton Park)
- 1128 (Crosby)
- 1175 (Prenton) - Disbanded
- 1438 (Prescot)
- 1439 (Skelmersdale)
- 1908 (Bootle)
- 1913 (Knotty Ash)
- 1966 (Wavertree) - Disbanded
- 1982 (Huyton)
- 2184 (Upton)
- 2275 (Walton) - Disbanded
- 2348 (Maghull)
- 2359 (Woolton)
- 2369 (Kirkby) - Disbanded
- 2375 (Neston)

=== South & West Yorkshire wing ===
Wing HQ Castleford

- 23 (South Elmsall)
- 44F (City of Bradford)
- 59 (Huddersfield)
- 96 (Dewsbury)
- 103 (Doncaster)
- 127 (City of Wakefield)
- 148 (Barnsley)
- 168 (City of Leeds)
- 185 (Batley)
- 208 (North Leeds)
- 218 (Rotherham)
- 250 (Halifax)
- 300 (Isle of Axholme)
- 362 (Elm Tree)
- 366 (King Ecgbert)
- 367 (South Sheffield)
- 370 (North Sheffield)
- 558 (Finningley) formerly 1053 DF
- 750 (Thorne)
- 860 (Mosborough) formerly 860 (Woodhouse)
- 868 (Mirfield)
- 1053 (Armthorpe)
- 1325 (Dinnington) formerly 860 DF
- 1384 (Askern)
- 1466 (Holmfirth)
- 2008 (Bawtry)
- 2357 (Goole)
- 2387 (Pudsey)
- 2388 (Castleford)
- 2447 (Calder Valley)
- 2458 (Shipley & Baildon)
- 2460 (Pontefract)
- 2490 (Spen Valley)

== South West region ==
Region HQ Devizes

=== Bristol & Gloucestershire wing ===
Wing HQ RAF Quedgeley

- 37 (Frampton Cotterell)
- 93 (City of Bath)
  93DF (Colerne)
- 125 (Cheltenham)
- 181 (City of Gloucester)
- 186 (Newent)
- 614 (Lydney)
- 649 (Dursley)
- 785 (Tewkesbury)
- 1245 (Cirencester)
- 1329 (Stroud)
  1329DF (Tetbury)
- 1446 (Clevedon)
- 1860 (East Bristol)
- 2002 (Kingswood)
- 2124 (Bristol Airport)
- 2146 (South East Bristol)
- 2152 (North Bristol)
  2152DF (Downend) (inactive from c.2022, officially disbanded 2025)
- 2322 (Dowty)
- 2328 (Bishop's Cleeve)
- 2342 (Innsworth)
- 2386 (Keynsham)
- 2392 (Thornbury)
- 2419 (Quedgeley)
- 2442 (Westbury-on-Trym)
- 2467 (Nailsea) – Inactive 2024 and 2025 - Re-opened September 2026
- 2494 (Portishead)
- 2509 (Chipping Sodbury)

=== Devon & Somerset wing ===
Wing HQ Wyvern Barracks

- 13 (City of Exeter)
- 20 (Bideford)
- 41F (Taunton)
- 65 (Bridgwater)
- 200 (Torquay) formerly Torquay Grammar School
  200DF (Brixham)
- 290 (Weston-Super-Mare)
  290DF (Burnham and Highbridge) formerly 2302 Sqn & 65 DF
- 299 (Exmouth)
- 326 (Hartland)
- 421 (Totnes)
  421DF (Dartmouth) (formerly 2380 Dartmouth)
- 722 (Chivenor)
- 914 (Glastonbury and Street)
- 1032 (Yeovil)
- 1064 (Honiton)
- 1079 (Tiverton)
- 1146 (Barnstaple)
- 1182 (Shepton Mallet)
- 1322 (Newton Abbot)
- 1955 (City of Wells)
- 2019 (Sidmouth)
- 2282 (Somer)
- 2381 (Ilminster)
- 2401 (Dawlish School)
- 2469 (Exeter St Thomas)

=== Dorset & Wiltshire wing ===
Wing HQ MoD Boscombe Down

- 7 Overseas (Jersey)
- 68 (Westbury)
- 130 (Bournemouth)
- 149 (Poole)
- 171 (Christchurch)
- 201 Overseas (Guernsey)
- 633 (West Swindon) Merged with 1244
- 874 (Sherborne)
- 878 (Highworth)
- 932 (Gillingham & Shaftesbury) disbanded 2015
- 992 (Malmesbury)
- 1010 (Salisbury)
- 1011 (Amesbury)
- 1069 (Flight Refuelling Wimborne)
- 1244 (Swindon)
- 1304 (Chippenham)
  1304DF (Rudloe Manor) became 2506 (Corsham)
- 1606 (Weymouth)
  1606DF (Bridport) disbanded in 2011
- 1995 (Bradford-on-Avon)
- 2003 (Stratton) disbanded in 2016
- 2182 (Dorchester)
- 2185 (Isle of Purbeck) - Formerly 2185 (Wareham)
  2185DF (Swanage) closed due to COVID in 2020 and was subsequently disbanded
- 2189 (Calne) Currently disbanded or shut down
- 2196 (Trowbridge)
- 2238 (Warminster)
- 2293 (Marlborough)
- 2340 (Blandford Forum)
- 2358 (Ferndown)
- 2385 (Melksham)
- 2391 (Parkstone)
- 2397 (Devizes)
- 2491 (Lyneham)
- 2506 (Corsham) formerly 1304DF (Rudloe Manor)

=== Hampshire & Isle of Wight wing ===
Wing HQ Newburgh House, Winchester

- 413 (Aldershot)
- 424 (City of Southampton)
- 443 (Basingstoke)
- 457 (Farnborough)
- 613 (Alton)
- 1024 (Isle of Wight)
- 1098 (Gosport)
- 1105 (City of Winchester)
- 1189 (Portsmouth)
- 1213 (Andover)
- 1216 (Eastleigh)
- 1308 (New Forest) (Stood Down 2021)
- 1350 (Fareham & District)
- 1391 (Romsey) (formerly 1105DF)
- 1827 (Odiham)
- 1927 (Petersfield)
- 2260 (Waterlooville)
- 2327 (Havant)
- 2407 (Yateley & Eversley)
- 2412 (Bordon)
- 2428 (Hedge End)
- 2495 (Hythe)
- 2498 (Totton)
- 2515 (Ringwood & Fordingbridge)

=== Plymouth & Cornwall wing ===
Wing HQ RAF St Mawgan

- 3 (Helston) (formerly 1157DF)
- 77 (Redruth)
- 147 (Camborne & District)
- 169 (St Blazey)
- 197 (Devonport)
- 335 (Saltash)
- 339 (South Dartmoor)
- 730 (City of Truro)
- 781 (Newquay)
- 1157 (Falmouth & District)
- 1225 (St Austell & District)
- 1387 (Liskeard)
- 1876 (Kingsbridge)
- 1900 (West Cornwall)
- 1942 (Wadebridge)
- 2171 (West Plymouth)
- 2174 (North Plymouth)
- 2309 (City of Plymouth)
- 2312 (Tavistock)
- 2339 (Plymstock & Mount Batten)
- 2377 (Plympton)
- 2443 (Okehampton)
- 2533 (Bodmin)

=== Thames Valley wing ===
Wing HQ Edward Brooks Barracks

- 136 (Chipping Norton)
- 150 (City of Oxford)
- 153 (Slough)
- 155 (Maidenhead)
- 211 (Newbury)
- 332 (High Wycombe)
- 381 (Reading)
- 447 (Henley-on-Thames)
- 459 (Windsor)
- 594 (Thame)
- 606 (Beaconsfield)
- 871 (Penn)
- 966 (Wallingford)
- 1116 (Woodley)
- 1315 (Kidlington)
- 1365 (Aylesbury)
- 1460 (Banbury) (formerly 25F)
- 1563 (Buckingham)
- 1811 (Marlow)
- 1861 (Wantage)
- 1866 (Hungerford)
- 1996 (Earley)
- 2120 (Witney)
- 2121 (Abingdon)
- 2204 (Chesham & Amersham)
- 2210 (Cowley)
- 2211 (Bracknell)
- 2267 (Brize Norton)
- 2366 (Bletchley Park)
- 2370 (Denham)
- 2402 (Burghfield)
- 2403 (Aldermaston)
- 2409 (Halton)
- 2410 (Didcot)
- 2477 (Britwell)
- 2499 (Wokingham)
- 2507 (Bicester)
- 2532 (Milton Keynes)

== Wales & West region ==
Region HQ RAF Cosford

=== Staffordshire wing ===
Wing HQ RAF Cosford

- 60 (Leek)
- 196 (Walsall)
- 240 (Darlaston)
- 388 (City of Stoke-on-Trent)
- 351 (Burton-on-Trent)
- 395 (Stafford)
- 425 (Aldridge)
- 435 (Newcastle-under-Lyme)
- 481 (West Bromwich)
- 888 (Oldbury)
- 1046 (Fordhouses)
- 1047 (City of Wolverhampton)
- 1122 (Marmion)
- 1200 (Polesworth)2019 closed due to condemned building and was subsequently disbanded due to COVID in 2020, merged with 1122 Marmion
- 1206 (City of Lichfield)
- 1290 (Wednesfield)
- 1444 (Brownhills)
- 1871 (Rugeley)
- 2078 (Boscobel)
- 2132 (Sedgley)
- 2151 (Biddulph)
- 2352 (Stone)
- 2415 (Penkridge)
- 2517 (Buxton)

=== West Mercian wing ===
Wing HQ RAF Cosford

- 1 Overseas (Akrotiri)
  1 Overseas DF (Ayios Nikolaos)
- 24 (Market Drayton)
- 28 (Shawbury)
- 63 (Bridgnorth)
- 79 (Whitchurch)
- 83 (St Georges)
- 124 (Hereford City)
- 151 (Leominster)
- 156 (Kidderminster)
- 187 (City of Worcester)
- 216 (Redditch)
- 223 (Halesowen)
- 233 (Pershore)
- 265 (Chetwynd)
- 333 (Ludlow)
- 347 (Dudley)
- 451 (Stourbridge)
- 1002 (Ross-on-Wye)
- 1017 (Malvern)
- 1119 (Shrewsbury)
- 1130 (Wrekin)
- 1165 (Oswestry)
- 2379 (Dawley)
- 2488 (Kingswinford)
- 2497 (Cosford)
- 2516 (Droitwich)

=== Number 1 Welsh wing ===
Wing HQ Maindy Barracks, Cardiff

- 30F (City of Llandaff)
- 210 (1st Monmouth)
- 212 (Risca)
- 254 (Aberdare)
- 275 (Nantyglo & Blaina)
- 277 (Blackwood)
- 372 (Barry)
- 415 (Merthyr Tydfil)
  415DF (Brecon)
- 1004 (Pontypridd)
- 1148 (Penarth)
- 1158 (Ebbw Vale)
- 1223 (Caerphilly)
- 1344 (Cardiff)
- 1367 (Caerleon)
- 2012 (Caldicot)
- 2077 (Pontyclun)
- 2167 (Tredegar)
- 2300 (St Athan)
- 2308 (Cwmbran)
- 2353 (Ystrad Mynach)
- 2478 (Abergavenny)

=== Number 2 Welsh wing ===
Wing HQ Queensferry TA Centre

- 271 (Colwyn Bay)
- 418 (Aberconwy)
- 579 (Llandrindod Wells)
  579DF (Knighton) (closed 2016)
- 856 (Chirk)
- 1251 (Berwyn)
- 1286 (Denbigh) (closed - 2010)
- 1310 (Eryri)
- 1340 (Rhyl)
- 1378 (Mold)
- 1465 (Gwynedd)
- 1557 (Friars School)
- 1918 (Ruthin)
- 2193 (Prestatyn)
- 2247 (Hawarden)
- 2279 (Wrexham)
- 2378 (Cybi) - disbanded
- 2416 (Newtown)
- 2445 (Ardudwy)
- 2474 (Cefni)
- 2480 (Holywell)
- 2518 (Flint)
- 2364 (Welshpool)

=== Number 3 Welsh wing ===
Wing HQ Ty Ifor Morgan, Park Road, Gorseinon, Swansea

- 215 (City of Swansea)
- 293 (Cowbridge)
- 334 (Neath)
- 360 (Llwchwr)
- 499 (Port Talbot)
- 561 (Ardwyn, Aberystwyth & District)
- 621 (Carmarthen)
- 948 (Haverfordwest and City of St Davids)
- 1054 (Llanelli)
- 1092 (Bridgend)
- 1358 (Pontardawe)
- 1429 (Cardigan & Aberporth)
- 1998 (West Cross)
- 2117 (Kenfig Hill & Porthcawl)
- 2318 (Aberkenfig)
- 2420 (Whitland & District)
- 2426 (Pencoed & District)
- 2475 (Ammanford)

=== Warwickshire & Birmingham wing ===
Wing HQ Coventry (Army Reserve Centre Canley)

- 8F (1st City of Coventry)
- 29F (Rugby)
- 84 (Coventry Airport) - disbanded
- 121 (Nuneaton)
- 163 (Coventry Phoenix)
- 165 (Castle Bromwich)
- 194 (BSA and City of Birmingham) - Disbanded
- 479 (Rubery)
- 480 (Studley) - Disbanded
- 485 (Harborne & Quinton)
- 487 (Kingstanding & Perry Barr)
- 489 (Acocks Green & Olton) - Disbanded
- 491 (City of Birmingham) - Disbanded
- 492 (Solihull)
- 492DF (St Paul's School for Girls) - No longer an ATC unit transferred to CCF as St Paul's School for Girls CCF
- 493 (Kings Heath & Moseley)
- 495 (Sutton Coldfield)
- 496 (Kenilworth and Balsall Common)
- 497 (Daventry)
- 1289 (Stratford-upon-Avon)
- 1347 (Elmdon) - Disbanded
  Amalgamated with 2030 (Yardley)
- 1368 (Warwick and Royal Leamington Spa)
- 1459 (Heart of England) - Inactive
- 1600 (St Philip’s Grammar School) - Disbanded
- 2028 (Southam)
- 2030 (Birmingham Airport) [Formerly 2030 (Elmdon and Yardley), Formerly 2030 (Yardley)]
- 2286 (Arden)
- 2504 (Fordbridge) - Amalgamated with 1459 (Heart of England) following its disbandment

== Scotland & Northern Ireland region ==
Region HQ Leuchars Station

With effect from the 1st of February 2021, Scotland and Northern Ireland will be restructured and encompass the following Wings;

- North Scotland wing (merger of Highland and North East Scotland wings)
- Central Scotland wing (merger of select units from North East and South East Scotland wings)
- South East Scotland wing (with modified footprint)
- West Scotland wing (with modified footprint)
- Northern Ireland wing (no change)

=== North Scotland wing ===
Wing HQ RAF Lossiemouth

- 52 (Aviemore)
- 161 (1st Highland) (Inverness)
  161DF (Ullapool)
- 379 (County of Ross)
- 423 (Elgin)
  423DF (Speyside)
- 446 (Forres)
- 832 (Wester Ross)
- 1068 (Nairn)
- 1285 (Caithness)
- 1730 (Lochaber)
- 1731 (Isle of Lewis)
- 1769 (Thurso & District)
  1769DF (Orkney)
- 2405 (Dingwall)
- 102 (Aberdeen Airport)
  102DF (Shetland)
- 107 (Aberdeen)
- 865 (Portlethen)
- 875 (Westhill)
- 877 (Inverurie)
- 1296 (Turriff)
- 1297 (Stonehaven)
- 1298 (Huntly)
- 1383 (Fraserburgh)
- 1990 (Ellon)
  1990DF(Boddam)
- 2489 (Bridge of Don)
- 2367 (Banchory)

=== Central Scotland wing ===
Wing HQ Leuchars Station

- 383 (Alloa)
- 38F (City Of Perth)
- 2288 (Montrose)
- 2422 (Arbroath)
- 2449 (Carnoustie)
- 2231 (Forfar)
- 775 (Burntisland)
- 859 (Dalgety Bay)
- 1019 (City of Stirling)
- 1145 (City Of Dunfermline)
- 1192 (Kirkcaldy)
- 1232 (City of Dundee)
- 2163 (Auchtermuchty)
- 1743 (Crieff)
- 2284 (Dunblane)
- 2311 (Glenrothes)
- 2345 (Leuchars)
- 2435DF (St Andrews)
- 2450 (Dundee)
- 2519 (Strathmore)

=== South East Scotland wing ===
Wing HQ Redford Barracks, Edinburgh

- 132 (North Berwick)
- 142 (Trinity)
- 287 (Stenhouse)
- 297 (Musselburgh)
- 439 (Linlithgow)
- 869 (Penicuik)
- 870 (Dreghorn)
  870DF (Gilmerton)
- 1007 (Duns)
- 1143 (8th Edinburgh) aka 1143 (Portobello) Sqn
- 1716 (Roxburgh) - disbanded
  1716DF (Kelso, Scottish Borders) - disbanded
- 1739 (2nd Midlothian)
- 1756 (Broxburn)
- 2180 (Galashiels)
- 2463 (Currie & Balerno)
- 2466 (Loanhead)
- 2535 (Livingston)
- 1271 (Bathgate)
- 1333 (Grangemouth Spitfire)
- 470 (Falkirk)
- 867 (Denny)

=== West Scotland wing ===
Wing HQ Paisley Cadet Centre

- 32F (1st Scottish)
- 49F (Greenock (MacRoberts Reply))
- 62 (2nd Glasgow)
- 122 (5th Glasgow)
- 137 (Ayr & Prestwick)
- 327 (Kilmarnock)
- 396 (Paisley)
- 449 (Lanark)
- 498 (Wishaw)
- 1001 (Monklands)
- 1089 (7th Glasgow)
- 1138 (Ardrossan)
- 1153 (2nd Dumfriesshire)
- 1195 (Irvine)
- 1371 (Girvan)
- 1701 (Johnstone)
- 1740 (Clydebank)
- 1777 (Dumbarton Blackburn)
- 2166 (Hamilton)
- 2175 (Rolls-Royce)
- 2296 (Dunoon)
- 2329 (Castle Douglas)
- 2414 (East Kilbride)
- 2452 (Shawlands Academy)
- 2496 (Cumbernauld)
- 2521 (Oban High School)

=== Northern Ireland wing ===
Wing HQ Aldergrove Flying Station

- 72 (Omagh)
- 72DF (Enniskillen)
- 814 (Portadown)
- 817 (Lisburn)
- 825 (Bangor)
- 833 (Antrim)
- 833DF (Larne) - Formerly 806 (Larne)
- 1137 (City of Belfast)
- 1919 (Newtownabbey)
- 2004 (Ballynahinch)
- 2062 (Carrickfergus)
- 2178 (Holywood)
- 2241 (Regent House School)
- 2349 (Ballymena)
- 2350 (Coleraine)

== See also ==
- List of squadrons in the New Zealand ATC
