= Blofeld (disambiguation) =

Ernst Stavro Blofeld is a villain in the James Bond series of novels and films. The name may also refer to:

== People ==
- Henry Blofeld (born 1939), British former sports journalist and cricket commentator
- John Blofeld (writer) (1913–1987), British writer on Asian thought and religion
- John Blofeld (judge) (born 1932), English barrister and former judge
- Nick Blofeld (born 1963), English sports businessman
- Tom Blofeld (born 1964), English writer and adventure park owner, son of John Blofeld the judge

== Other uses ==
- Waldorf Blofeld, synthesizer manufactured by Waldorf Music

== See also ==
- Blofield
- Blomfield (disambiguation)
- Bloomfield (disambiguation)
