= Autism Act 2009 =

Act of Parliament of the United Kingdom

- Act of Parliament
- Parliament of the United Kingdom
- Long title: An Act to make provision about meeting the needs of adults with autistic spectrum conditions; and for connected purposes.
- Citation: 2009 c. 15
- Introduced by: Cheryl Gillan (Commons); Baroness Pitkeathley (Lords)
- Territorial extent: England and Wales

Dates
- Royal assent: 12 November 2009
- Commencement: 12 January 2010

Status: Current legislation

History of passage through Parliament

Text of statute as originally enacted

Revised text of statute as amended

The Autism Act 2009 (c. 15) is an act of the Parliament of the United Kingdom. The act makes provision about the needs of adults who have autistic spectrum disorders including autism and Asperger syndrome.

== Background ==
The act began as part of the National Autistic Society's I Exist campaign which led to the creation of a private member's bill. This was drafted by a number of autism related organisations:

- National Autistic Society (NAS)
- AIM
- Autism Anglia
- Autism Education Trust
- Autism Initiatives UK
- Autism Research Centre (ARC)
- Autism Speaks
- Autism West Midlands
- The Children's Society
- Hampshire Autistic Society
- Research Autism
- Staffordshire Adults Autistic Society
- Sussex Autistic Community Trust
- TreeHouse
- The Wessex Autistic Society
- Wirral Autistic Society

It was introduced to the House of Commons by Conservative MP Cheryl Gillan on 21 January 2009. It was then introduced to the House of Lords on 2 June 2009.

== Duties ==
=== Autism Strategy ===
The Secretary of State has a duty to prepare and publish an autism strategy which sets out the strategy for meeting the needs of adults in England across the autistic spectrum by improving the provision of relevant services to such adults by local authorities, National Health Service (NHS) bodies and foundation trusts. This strategy has to be published no later than 1 April 2010.

The Secretary of State must keep the strategy under review. They must also consult and seek the participation of persons they deem appropriate when preparing the strategy and revising it in such a way which would result in a substantial change to the strategy in the Secretary of State's opinion.

=== Guidance ===
In order for the strategy to be successful, the Secretary of State must issue guidance to NHS bodies and local authorities by no later than 31 December 2010. The Secretary of State must also keep the guidance under review. The guidance must include guidance about:

1. the provision of relevant services for the purpose of diagnosing autistic spectrum conditions in adults;
2. the identification of adults with such conditions;
3. the assessment of the needs of adults with such conditions for relevant services;
4. planning in relation to the provision of relevant services to persons with autistic spectrum conditions as they move from being children to adults;
5. other planning in relation to the provision of relevant services to adults with autistic spectrum conditions;
6. the training of staff who provide relevant services to adults with such conditions;
7. local arrangements for leadership in relation to the provision of relevant services to adults with such conditions.

The Secretary of State must also consult local authorities and NHS bodies when issuing guidance or when revising it in such a way which would result in a substantial change to the guidance.

=== Local authorities and NHS bodies ===
Local authorities and NHS bodies have a duty under this act to treat guidance as if it were general guidance issued under section 7 of the Local Authority Social Services Act 1970.

=== Expenses ===
Parliament will pay for any expenditure incurred under or because of this Act by the Secretary of State and any increase due to the introduction of the Act.

== Provisions ==
Section 6(2) provides that the act came into force at the end of the period of two months that began on the date on which it was passed. The word "months" means calendar months. The day (that is to say, 12 November 2009) on which the act was passed (that is to say, received royal assent) is included in the period of two months. This means that the Act came into force on 12 January 2010.

== Reception ==
Sasha Daly, Policy and Parliamentary Manager at TreeHouse, said: "At TreeHouse we believe that there is still much work to be done to improve services for the one in 100 children and young people with autism. Their parents all too often have to fight to get the right provision for their children. We will be working with the Department for Children, Schools and Families to ensure that they keep to their word to implement these improvements."

Richard Mills, Director of Research at Research Autism, said: "This is a wonderful end to a determined campaign led by the NAS. We are hopeful that it will lead to an improvement in services and support for adults with autism in England. As the evidence base for effective services for adults is poor we hope that the Autism Strategy, that will underpin the Act, will take full account of the potential contribution of research to the development of effective services. Research Autism is proud to have been associated with this campaign."
