= Yare and Bure One Design =

Keelboat sailing class Norfolk broads

Development
- Designer: Ernest Woods
- Year: 1908
- No. built: 144
- Design: One-Design

Boat
- Displacement: 600 kg
- Draft: 2'9"

Hull
- LOA: 22' inc bowsprit
- LWL: 18'

Sails
- Total sail area: 279 sqft

Racing
- RYA PN: 1117

The Yare and Bure One design, YBOD, or 'White Boat', is a One Design, gunter-rigged, 22-foot keelboat designed for sailing on the Norfolk Broads.

All YBODs are named after a caterpillar or moth, as named in the 1945 book Checklist of the British Lepidoptera with the English name of each of the 2299 Species.

== History ==
The YBOD was designed in 1908 by Ernest Woods for a competition by Yare and Bure Sailing Club, which wanted to establish a One Design class. The aim was to remove all differences between boats other than the skill of the helm, to limit costly development and arguments over handicaps.

Ernest Woods built 69 boats, and on his death his nephew Herbert Woods became the class builder. Herbert built 24 further boats, until the price of building in wood became prohibitive.

A mould was taken of an Ernest-built boat to allow GRP hulls to be built, as all YBODs have been since no.94.

== Racing ==
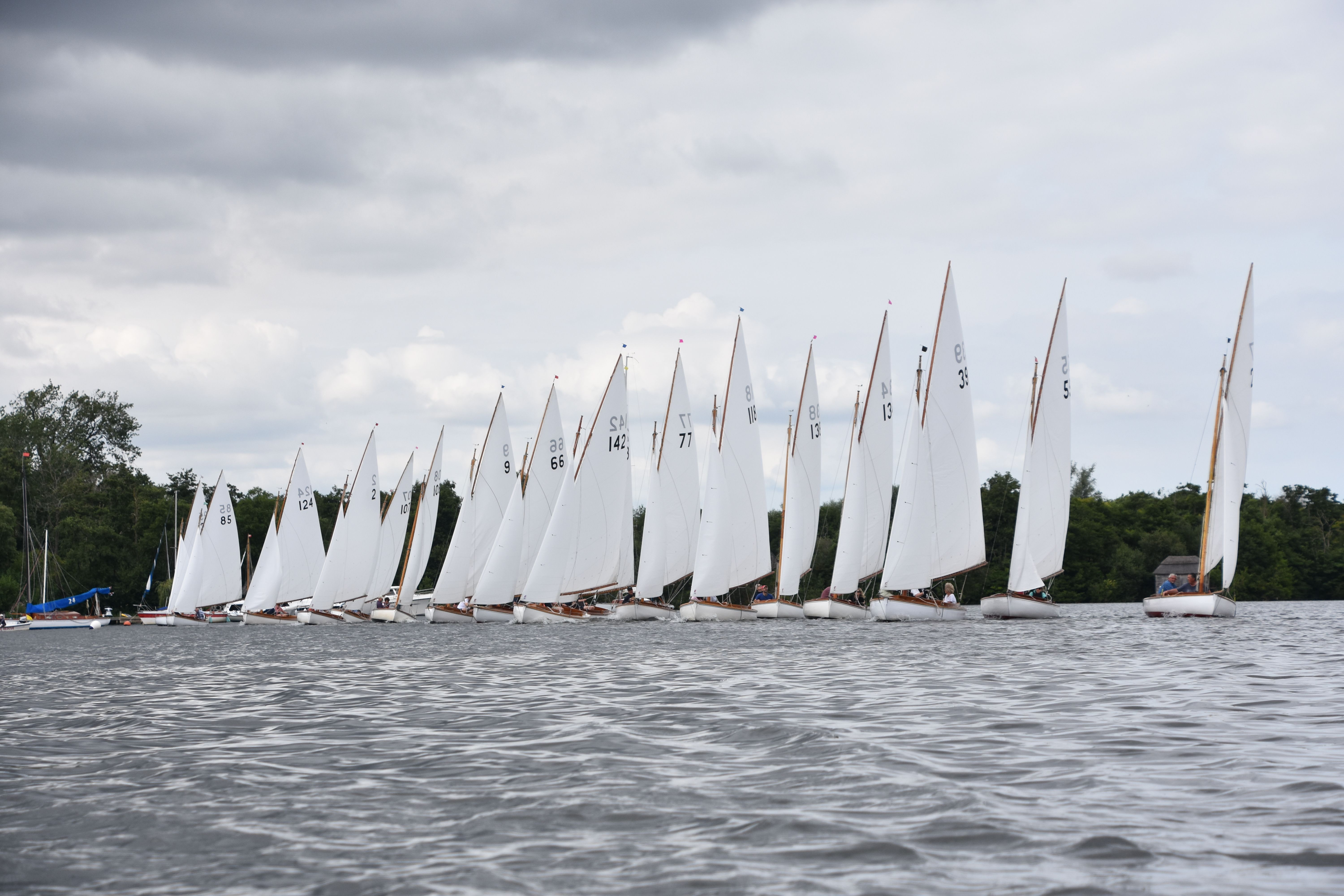
YBODs racing at NBYC

YBODs are raced on the Norfolk Broads, with fleets found at NBYC, NPC, HSC, and other local clubs. YBODs regularly compete in the Three Rivers Race held by Horning Sailing Club, which was won by one in its first year, 1961, and in multiple years after, most recently in 2023, 2024, and 2025.

The class flag of the YBOD is V.

For handicap racing against other classes of boat, the YBOD has a Portsmouth Yardstick of 1117.
