= Hoveton Little Broad =

- Black Horse Broad
- Location within Norfolk Location within England
- Interactive map of Hoveton Little Broad
- Location: Hoveton, Norfolk
- Coordinates: 52°42′20″N 1°27′0″E
- Type: Flooded peatland
- Part of: The Broads
- Primary inflows: River Bure
- Primary outflows: Pound End Broad
- Basin countries: Great Britain
- Managing agency: Broads Authority
- Average depth: 1 metre (3 ft 3 in)

Hoveton Little Broad, also known as Black Horse Broad, is a secluded broad of fairly open aspect, in the middle reaches of the River Bure between Hoveton and Horning, Norfolk, in The Norfolk Broads. Privately owned, it was the site of direct action in the mid-20th century by local people hoping to establish the right of free public access to all Broadland waterways.

== Situation and access ==
The broad is closer to Horning than to the village of Hoveton and lies adjacent to the hamlet of Hoveton St John. Inaccessible by road, it is linked to the river by Black Horse Dyke. Another dyke (a narrow waterway) leads from a corner of the broad to the main Hoveton-Horning road B1354. Just up hill towards Hoveton formerly stood the Black Horse pub, which gave the broad its alternative name. A waterlogged footpath to the road was used by the Norfolk wherrymen as they made their way to the pub. Like Martham Broad and Horsey Mere, this broad is closed for navigation in the winter months, to enable the waterbirds to breed. There are no staithes on the shore of the broad for public mooring and no shore based facilities.

== Pound End Broad ==
One end of the broad is partially enclosed by projecting spits of land and known as Pound End Broad. It is a mixed coarse fishery and is closed permanently to watercraft. A bird exclosure was built here in the mid 1990s to protect an area of marginal vegetation, preventing water plants being damaged by coots. Keeping the birds out of this area had the incidental effect of creating a fish refuge, heavily used by all the resident species of fish, numbers of which increased compared to fish in the main broad.

== 'The Invasion of Black Horse Broad', 1949 ==
In the mid-20th century, Hoveton Little Broad played a role in the historical dispute between landowners and the public over rights of access to private broads. Since time immemorial, all Broadland waters had been considered part of the King's River and thus freely accessible to all. However, in the 19th century, several Norfolk landowners prevented access to broads in their ownership from the main river network under the inclosure acts. Boatbuilder Herbert Woods led a public campaign against the landowners' action, culminating in the 'invasion of Black Horse Broad' in March 1949. Woods and 30 local men dismantled the barrier that the landowner had placed across Black Horse Dyke. This direct action resulted in an agreement with the broad's owner, who agreed to open the broad to the public each year between Easter and mid-September. However, this campaign did not lead to the re-opening of other closed broads.
