= Tom Blofeld =

British writer

Thomas Henry Calthorpe Blofeld (born 30 May 1964) is an English writer of children's books and the owner and CEO of Bewilderwood, an adventure park in Horning, Norfolk. The author of three books for children, A Boggle at Bewilderwood (available also in a poetic version), The Bewilderbats, and A Bewildermuddle, Blofeld also runs his family's country estate, Hoveton, located in the village of the same name. He is also a Vice President of Autism Anglia.

Blofeld is the son of Sir John Blofeld, a former High Court judge, and the nephew of Henry Blofeld, the cricket commentator. Like his father and uncle he attended Sunningdale School.

He is married to Leslie Felperin, a film critic for Variety magazine, and the father of two children, born in 2007 and 2008.
