= Horning =

Village in Norfolk, England

Coordinates: 52.7°N 1.467°E

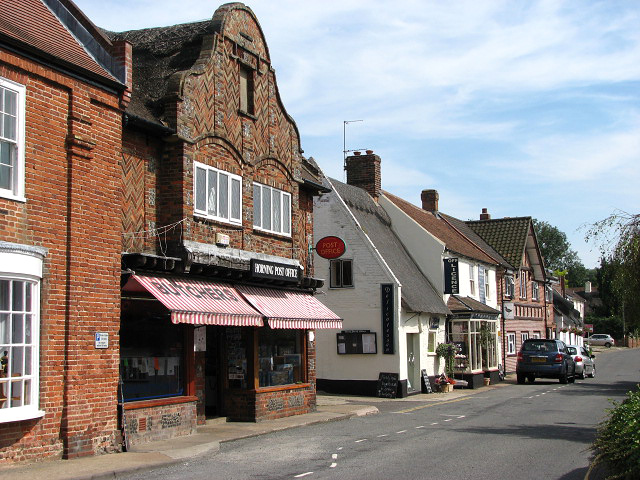
- Post Office and shop fronts on Lower Street

- Location within Norfolk
- Area: 11.04 km^{2} (4.26 sq mi)
- Population: 1,100 (approx, 2021)
  - Density: 100/km^{2} (260/sq mi)
- OS grid reference: TG343170
- Civil parish: Horning
- District: North Norfolk
- Shire county: Norfolk
- Region: East
- Country: England
- Sovereign state: United Kingdom
- Post town: NORWICH
- Postcode district: NR12 8AA
- Dialling code: 01692 630956
- Police: Norfolk
- Fire: Norfolk
- Ambulance: East of England
- UK Parliament: North Norfolk

Horning is an ancient village and parish in the English county of Norfolk. It covers an area of 11 km^{2} and had a population of approximately 1,100 in the 2021 census. Horning parish lies on the northern bank of the River Bure south of the River Thurne and is located in The Broads National Park. For the purposes of local government, it falls within the district of North Norfolk, although areas alongside the rivers and broads fall into the executive area of the Broads Authority.

== History ==
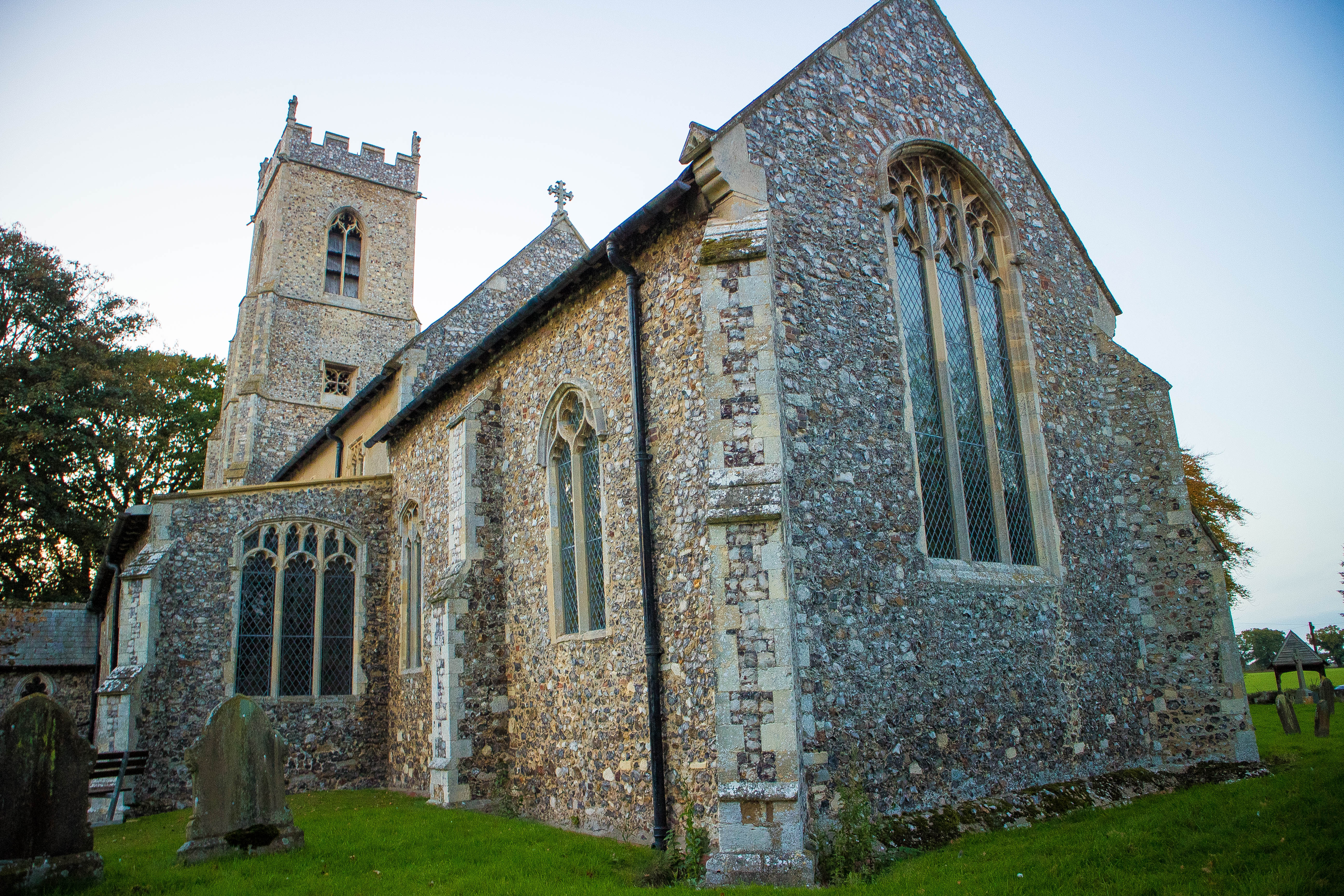
St Benedict's Church, Horning

The name Horning means the "folk who live on the high ground between the rivers". Its history dates back to 1020, when the manor was given by King Canute to the newly founded Abbey of St. Benet at Hulme. The Bishop of Norwich, as Abbot of St. Benets, is still Lord of the Manor.

Horning Parish extends along the south bank of the River Bure to Thurne Mouth, and includes the ruins of St Benet's Abbey & St. James Hospital. St. Benet's Abbey is a Grade I listed building, and dates back to the 9th century. The importance of the Abbey as a medieval place of pilgrimage is reflected in the medieval finds of two papal seals, that would have secured documents from the Pope. It was also the site of the composition of the c. 1290 Chronicle of John of Oxnead.

The Church of St. Benedict lies half a mile east of the village, and dates back to the 13th century.

Horning is situated on the River Bure (pronounced locally "Burr") between Wroxham and Ludham. A ferry plied across the river for more than 1,000 years.

Horning has an entry in the Domesday Book of 1086, noted under the name 'Horningam'. In 1086, Horning had 18 villagers, 11 'smallholders', 4 cattle, 10 pigs, 360 sheep and the taxable value was £4.

Archaeologists have found ancient earthworks in Horning, which run alongside the River Bure, possibly dating to the early Saxon period. The earliest ancient monument is a Bronze Age ring ditch and possible burial pit. Neolithic and Bronze Age artefacts have also been found.

== Leisure and attractions ==
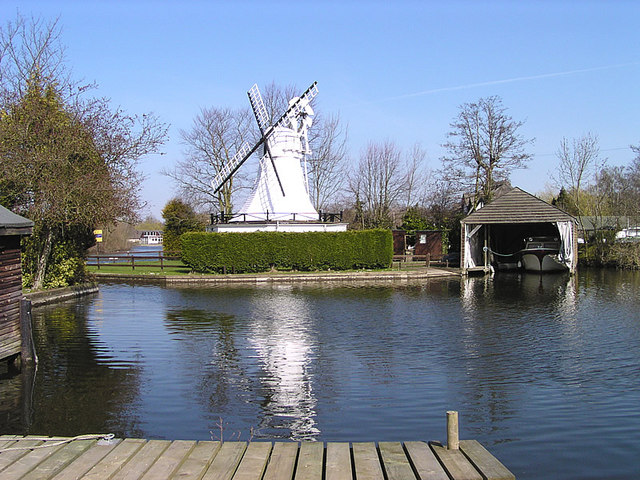
A windmill in Horning

The village of Horning is a very popular tourist destination within the Norfolk Broads, having attractions both around the village and surrounding areas. The village lies on the north bank of the River Bure, and has many waterside properties, pubs, shops, restaurants, tea-rooms, boat-trips as well as other features to enjoy.

Following Lower Street to the east, leads to the school, marina, leisure centre, church and the old riverbank. North of Horning are the broads of Barton, Alderfen and Burntfen, and village of Neatishead; to the west is the popular area of Hoveton & Wroxham; to the east lies the quaint village of Ludham. To the south, across the river via the ferry, are Bure Marshes and village of Woodbastwick. The Ferry Inn to the east of the village was largely destroyed in a Second World War bombing raid by the German Luftwaffe on 26 April 1941, during which 15 bombs are believed to have been dropped on Horning and the surrounding area by a single aircraft. Most landed in the local marshes, but one hit the ferry and one hit the Inn, where 21 of the 24 people in the pub at the time were killed. The Ferry Inn was open for business with a makeshift bar only three weeks later.

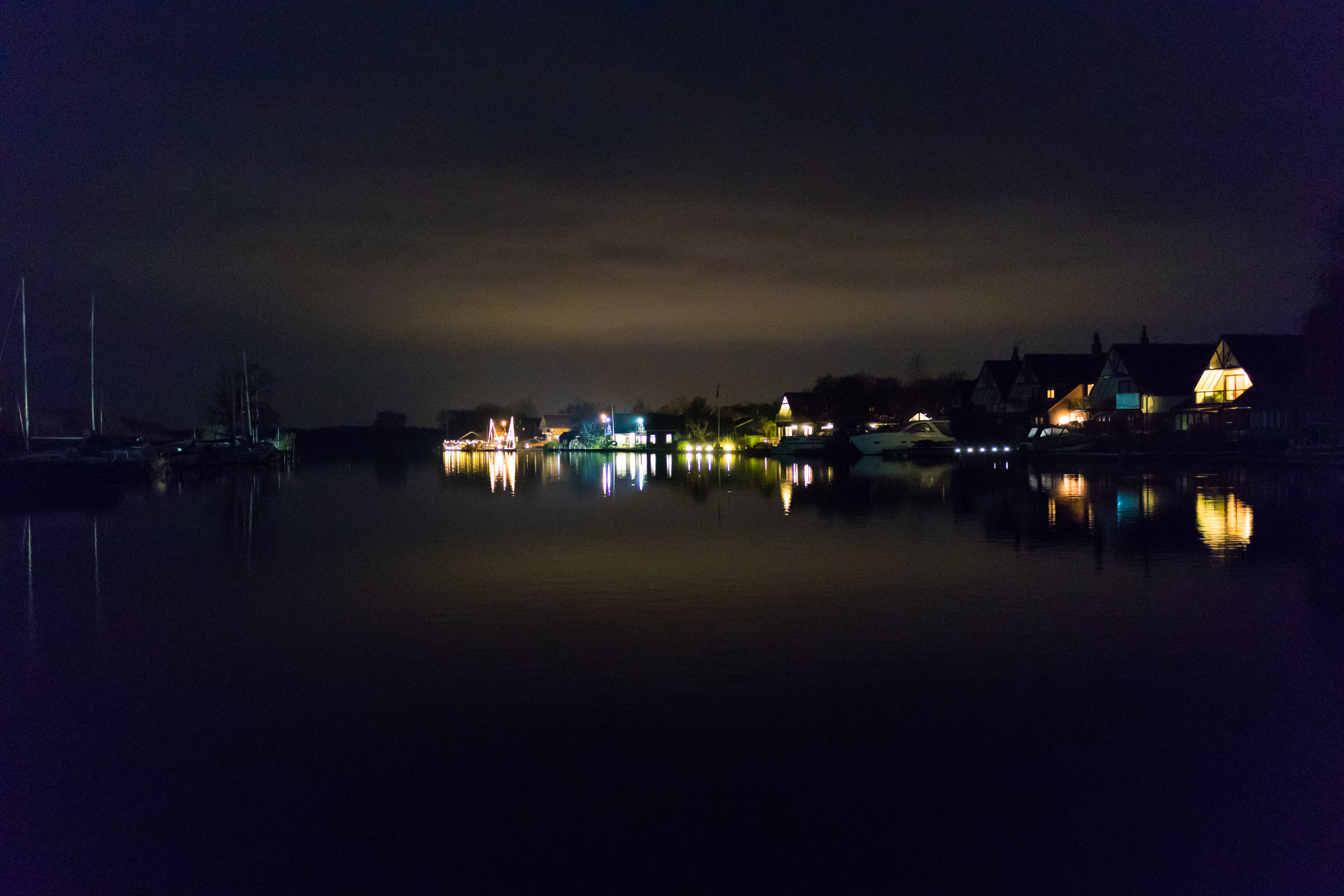
River Bure Horning at night

Horning is home to Southern Comfort, the Mississippi Cruise boat, which leaves from the staithe adjacent to The Swan Inn.

The village is popular for sail and motor boating, with Horning Sailing Club hosting regular annual events. Several boatyards specialise in boat sales, boat hire, boat building and repairs. There are two marinas which offer private mooring facilities. The River Bure is navigable from the North Sea at Great Yarmouth all the way to Horning.

The village centre is quite small, consisting of just a single street, a village green, The Swan Inn pub (built early 19th century but dating back to 1696), a few shops and restaurants, and a riverbank adjacent to the River Bure. The main village hall, playing fields and children's play area, are located behind Lower Street on the upper side of the village.

Outside the village centre is the popular Bewilderwood theme park, which was voted best large attraction in the East of England (2009), as well as having won many other UK and International awards. Broadland Cycle Hire is located within Bewilderwood, from which there are many good cycle routes through rural areas to villages and broads.

Other local attractions nearby include Barton Broad boardwalk, Neatishead village, Ludham village, shopping in Hoveton & Wroxham. A short distance away are many beaches, such as Waxham, Sea Palling and Winterton-on-Sea, as well as the more popular holiday destinations of Great Yarmouth and Cromer. The North Norfolk Coast, which is a designated Area of Outstanding Natural Beauty, is approximately an hour away.

== Transport ==
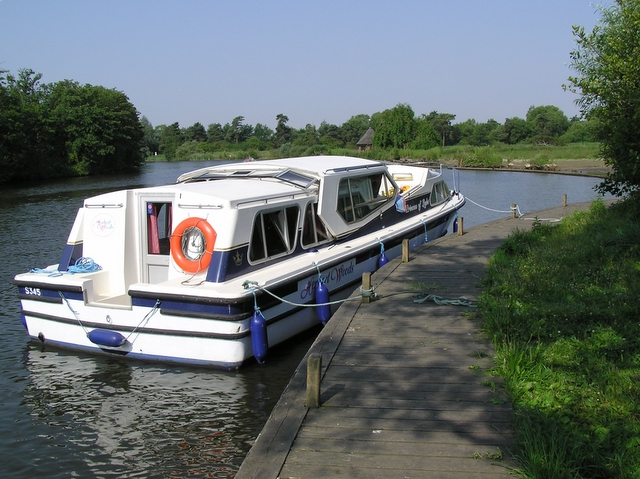
View from church staithe

Horning lies just off the A1062 road, which is a designated Rural Route. This Rural Route starts at Hoveton, passes through Horning and Ludham, before ending in Potter Heigham.

=== Car ===
The city of Norwich is a 25-minute drive from Horning. Sprowston Park & Ride is 12 minutes away.

=== Train ===
The nearest railway station is Hoveton & Wroxham, located on the Bittern Line between Norwich and Sheringham.

=== Air ===
Norwich International Airport has scheduled flights to destinations such as Amsterdam, Edinburgh, Manchester and Exeter. The airport is a 26min drive away.

=== Bus ===
Horning is served by the 5B bus, operated by Konectbus.

=== Bicycle ===
There is a cycle path between Horning and Hoveton, which takes about 15 mins to cycle. The Norfolk Broads Cycle Centre can be found nearby at Bewilderwood.

=== Passenger ferry ===
There has been a ferry service connecting Horning and Woodbastwick for generations. The ferry connects The Ferry Inn with Woodbastwick Staithe, for access to Bure Marshes, Ranworth, Cockshoot Broad, Woodbastwick brewery and The Fur & Feather Inn. The Horning Foot Ferry transports passengers, cycles and dogs, currently on Fridays, Saturdays and Sundays, 10.30am – 7.30pm.

== Events ==
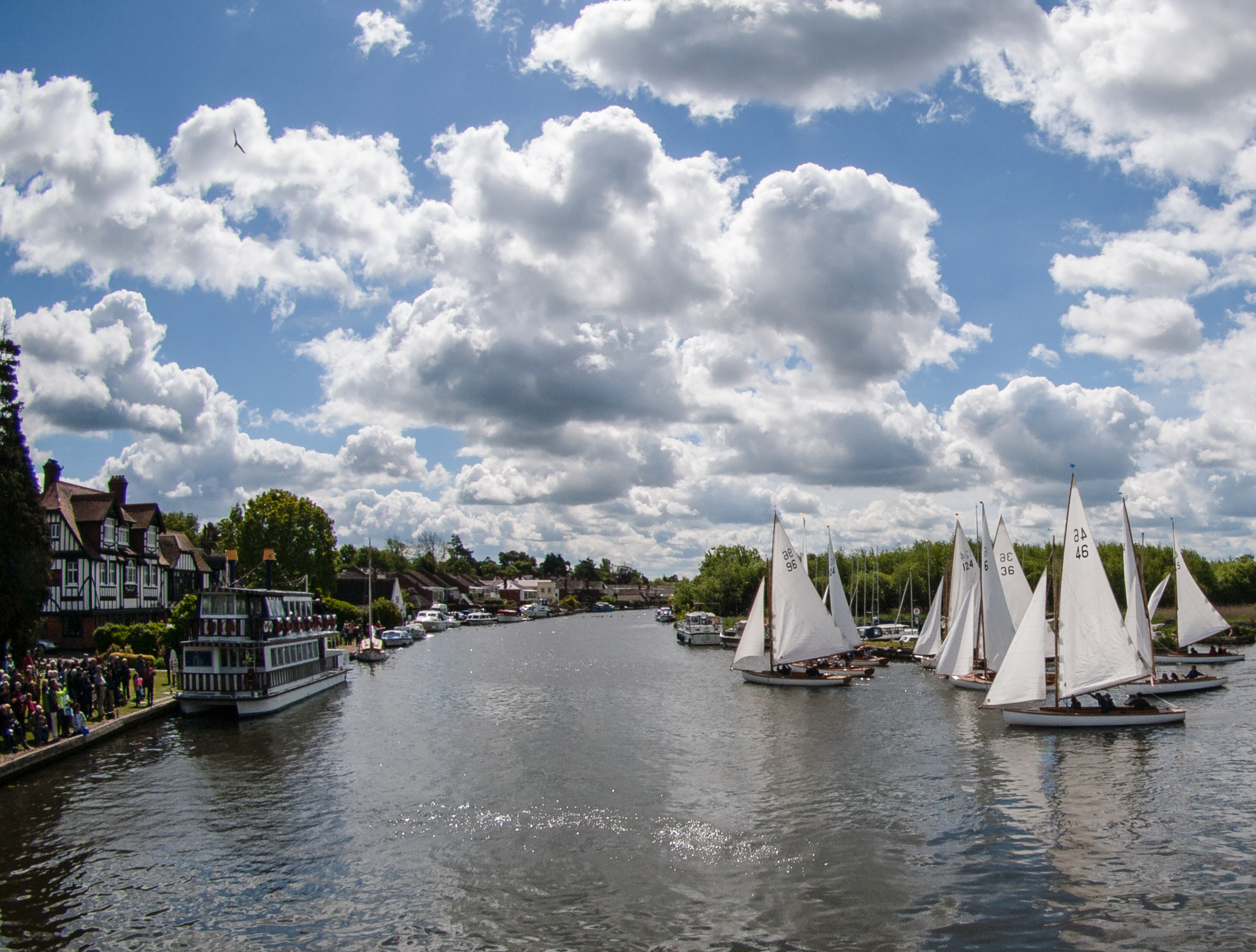
Start of the 2015 Three Rivers Race

- Three Rivers Race – sailing event, over 24 hours
- Horning Boat Show (last held 30 April 2022)
- Village Fete (July)
- Boat Regatta (early August)
- School Summer Fair (July)

== Recreations ==
- Horning Sailing Club
- Children's Playground
- Outdoor table tennis table
- St. Benets Hall (for regular art exhibitions)

== Services and facilities ==
- Public toilets
- Car and coach park
- Public moorings
- Pub moorings
- Electric hook-up
- Refuse disposal
- Marina services
- Bottle, paper and clothing recycling banks
- Water – standpipe at Swan green
- Slipways – public slipway adjacent to The Swan Inn, three private slipways at Horning Sailing Club

== Nearby ==
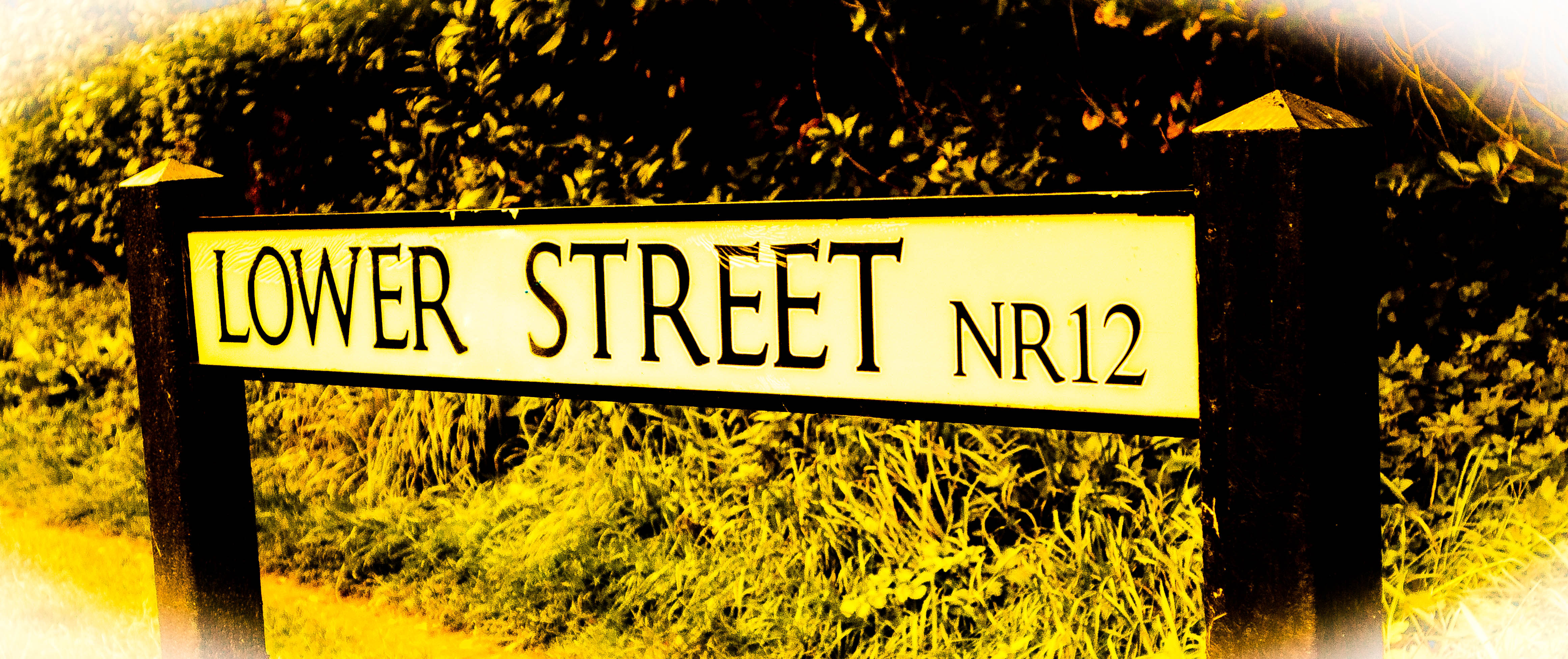
Street sign, Lower Street, Horning

- Bewilderwood
- St Benet's Abbey
- RAF Neatishead
- RAF Air Defence Radar Museum
- Hoveton village
- Ludham village
- Wroxham village
- Fairhaven Woodland and Water Garden
- Potter Heigham
- Roys of Wroxham
- Woodforde's Brewery

== Media ==
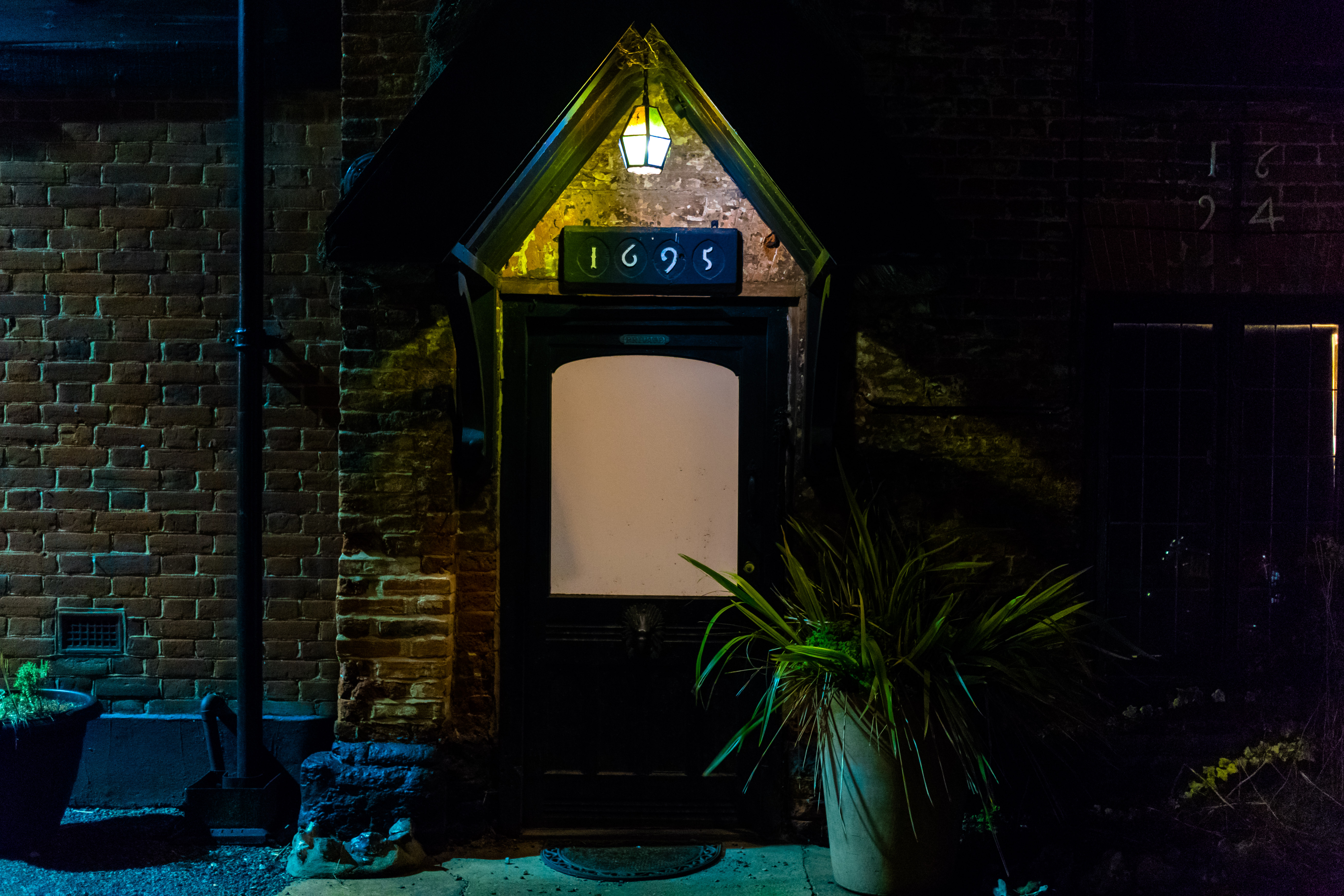
The Swan Inn house, Horning

Arthur Ransome's books Coot Club and The Big Six were written based on his time spent in Horning. Several scenes in the books take place in the village. The books were made into a 1984 BBC television series, Swallows and Amazons Forever!. In 2016, Swallows and Amazons was released as a major film production. The 2015 film 45 Years was filmed in Horning village, and locally on the River Bure.

Veteran radio presenter Keith Skues lives in the village, with his collection of around 300,000 records. He presented his popular Sunday late night show on BBC Local Radio from his home many times.

== Education ==
Horning Community Primary School has primary education for 5–11 year olds, and pre-school for 2–4 year olds.

The 2022 Ofsted report rated Horning Community Primary School overall as 'Good'.

The nearest secondary school to Horning is Broadland High School in Hoveton.

== Communications ==
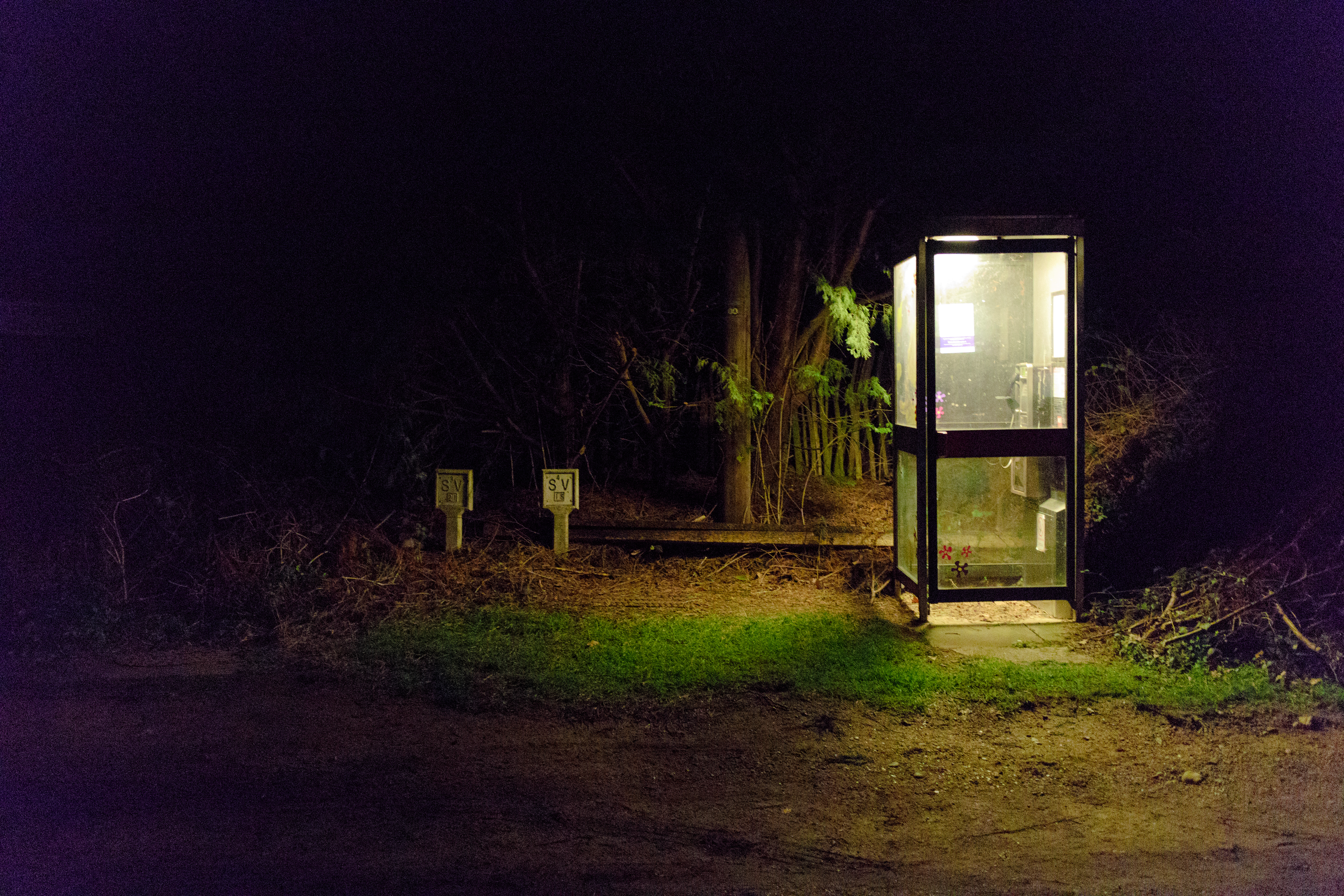
Horning telephone box

In addition to the usual terrestrial TV and telephone landline services, the following communication services are available in Horning:

- Fibre broadband (Fibre to the Cabinet FTTC)
- Broadband (ADSL)
- Digital TV and radio
- Mobile Phone networks
- Mobile HSDPA, 3G and 4G

Horning will receive full fibre broadband from summer 2024.
