= John Blofeld =

John Blofeld may refer to:

- John Blofeld (judge) (1932–2025), English barrister and judge
- John Blofeld (writer) (1913–1987), British writer
