= Herbert Woods =

English boat builder and mooring developer

Herbert Benjamin Woods (3 February 1891 – 18 April 1954) was an English boat builder and mooring developer from Potter Heigham, Norfolk.

== Early life ==
Woods was born to a family of boat builders in Brundall in 1891. He started his career as an apprentice at the Norfolk Broads Yachting Company upon leaving school in 1907. The company was then managed by his father, Walter George Woods.

Following the outbreak of World War I, Woods was spared from active service as a result of a chronic neck problem. During this time, he worked in aerodynamics at agricultural machinery maker Ransomes, Sims & Jefferies, based in Ipswich, Suffolk.

Woods returned to Norfolk in 1922, after the Norfolk Broads Yachting Company had gone into liquidation. His father, Walter, purchased the premises and enlisted the help of Herbert and his brother to build the family company, Walter Woods & Sons.

== Boat building ==
In 1926, Woods designed and built a Broads motor cruiser titled the ‘Speed of Light’. The vessel was smaller than existing models, coming in at 34-foot. She would draw in less water than older models and was the first in the fleet to encompass a freshwater tank, supplying the on-board toilet and taps.

Herbert Woods took over the company in 1929, naming it the Herbert Woods Boatyard. The business offered boating holidays across the Norfolk Broads and continued building both sailing and motor cruisers for the Broads.

Woods designed, and in 1931 built the first of the Norfolk One-Design 14-foot Dinghy Class, which was much cheaper than the contemporary 14 ft International Class, and which would eventually run to some 86 boats in the class.

== Construction of ‘Broads Haven' ==
By the mid-1930s, the company had completed construction on the six-acre ‘Broads Haven’ mooring facilities. The project involved more than 60,000 tons of clay being moved by hand, leading to a finished marina that included a hairdressers and on-site shop.

== The company during World War II ==
During World War II, the company worked for The Admiralty and the Air Ministry, and built over 200 boats including Air Sea Rescue Launches, Pinnaces, Airborne Lifeboats, torpedo boats and harbour defence motor launches from its base in Norfolk. It employed over 300 staff.

== Campaign for public access to more of the Norfolk Broads ==
In 1949, Woods led a campaign to open up areas of the Broads being treated as private property, including Hoveton Little Broad.

== Death ==
Woods died of a heart attack on 18 April 1954. The company was purchased by private investors, before being returned to the name Herbert Woods in 2010.
