= Bewilderwood =

Family adventure park in Norfolk, UK

BeWILDerwood
- Interactive map of BeWILDerwood
- Location: Hoveton, Norfolk, United Kingdom
- Coordinates: 52.7109°N 1.4503°E.
- Owner: Tom Blofeld

BeWILDerwood is an adventure park for families located in Horning, a parish in the English county of Norfolk. Self-described as a "curious treehouse adventure," the attraction is situated in a woodland area and features treehouses, rope bridges, slides, zip wires, a maze, and two special areas for children under five called "Toddlewood-on-the-Hill" and "Tiptoe Valley". The original branding was created by Purple Circle.

Entrance is as if to the whole forest and the adventure world of rope bridges and treehouses is a river ride away, through the 'swamp' and past the creature who blows bubbles to the surface. The park is set up to give a more natural appearance than typical urban ones with extensive use of natural materials. Swings are three people wide as are some of the scary slides.

The park's rides and other features are based on characters and events in A Boggle at BeWILDerwood and The Bewilderbats, books for children written by BeWILDerwood's owner Tom Blofeld and illustrated by Steve Pearce. A Boggle at BeWILDerwood recounts the adventures of Swampy the marsh boggle as he struggles to overcome his fears and be a little braver. In the sequel, Bewilderbats, Swampy and his friends set out to rescue a tiny Twiggle who is stuck up a tree.
