= Norfolk Fire and Rescue Service =

Statutory fire and rescue service

Operational area
- Country: England
- County: Norfolk
- Address: Jubilee House, Falconers Chase, Wymondham, Norfolk, NR18 0WW

Agency overview
- Annual calls: 7,285 incidents
- Employees: 281 wholetime firefighters; 504 on-call firefighters; 22 fire control staff; 142 support staff
- Annual budget: £27.7 million
- Chief Fire Officer: Ceri Sumner
- Motto: Aestimemur agendo

Facilities and equipment
- Stations: 42
- Engines: 53
- USAR: 4
- Aerial Ladder Platforms: 3

Website
- www.norfolk.gov.uk/safety/norfolk-fire-and-rescue-service

Norfolk Fire and Rescue Service (NFRS) is the statutory fire and rescue service for the county of Norfolk in the east of England. The county consists of around 870,100 people, covering the 4th largest area in England with 2,074 square miles including 200 miles of inland waterways, 90 miles of coastline and 6,125 miles of roads. The county city is Norwich with other major towns including Great Yarmouth, King's Lynn and Thetford. Norfolk has one of the 20 Urban Search and Rescue teams across England and Wales which were set up in response to the 9/11 attacks. The teams, including Norfolk, have the capacity to deal with two simultaneous incidents across the UK.

== Headquarters and control room ==
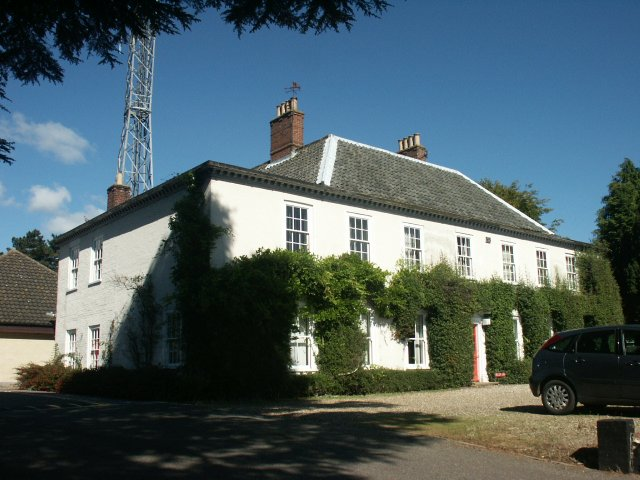
The former Headquarters of Norfolk Fire and Rescue Service, Whitegates, Hethersett

The headquarters of Norfolk Fire and Rescue Service is Jubilee House, Falconers Chase, Wymondham, Norfolk in a combined HQ with Norfolk Constabulary. The joint operations centre is located within the Contact and Control Room (CCR) of Norfolk Constabulary. The former headquarters, Whitegates, was commandeered for use by the National Fire Service during the Second World War and was eventually purchased by Norfolk County Council in 1950. The building was built as a family home in the late eighteenth century and has had various owners over the years. New building at the rear of the original house in recent times has replaced the coach house and stables of earlier times.

== Performance ==
Every fire and rescue service in England and Wales is periodically subjected to a statutory inspection by His Majesty's Inspectorate of Constabulary and Fire & Rescue Services (HMICFRS). The inspections investigate how well the service performs in each of three areas. On a scale of outstanding, good, requires improvement and inadequate, Norfolk Fire and Rescue Service was rated as follows:

HMICFRS Inspection Norfolk
Area	Rating 2018/19	Rating 2021/22	Description
Effectiveness	Requires improvement	Requires improvement	How effective is the fire and rescue service at keeping people safe and secure from fire and other risks?
Efficiency	Requires improvement	Requires improvement	How efficient is the fire and rescue service at keeping people safe and secure from fire and other risks?
People	Requires improvement	Requires improvement	How well does the fire and rescue service look after its people?

== Appliances and capabilities ==
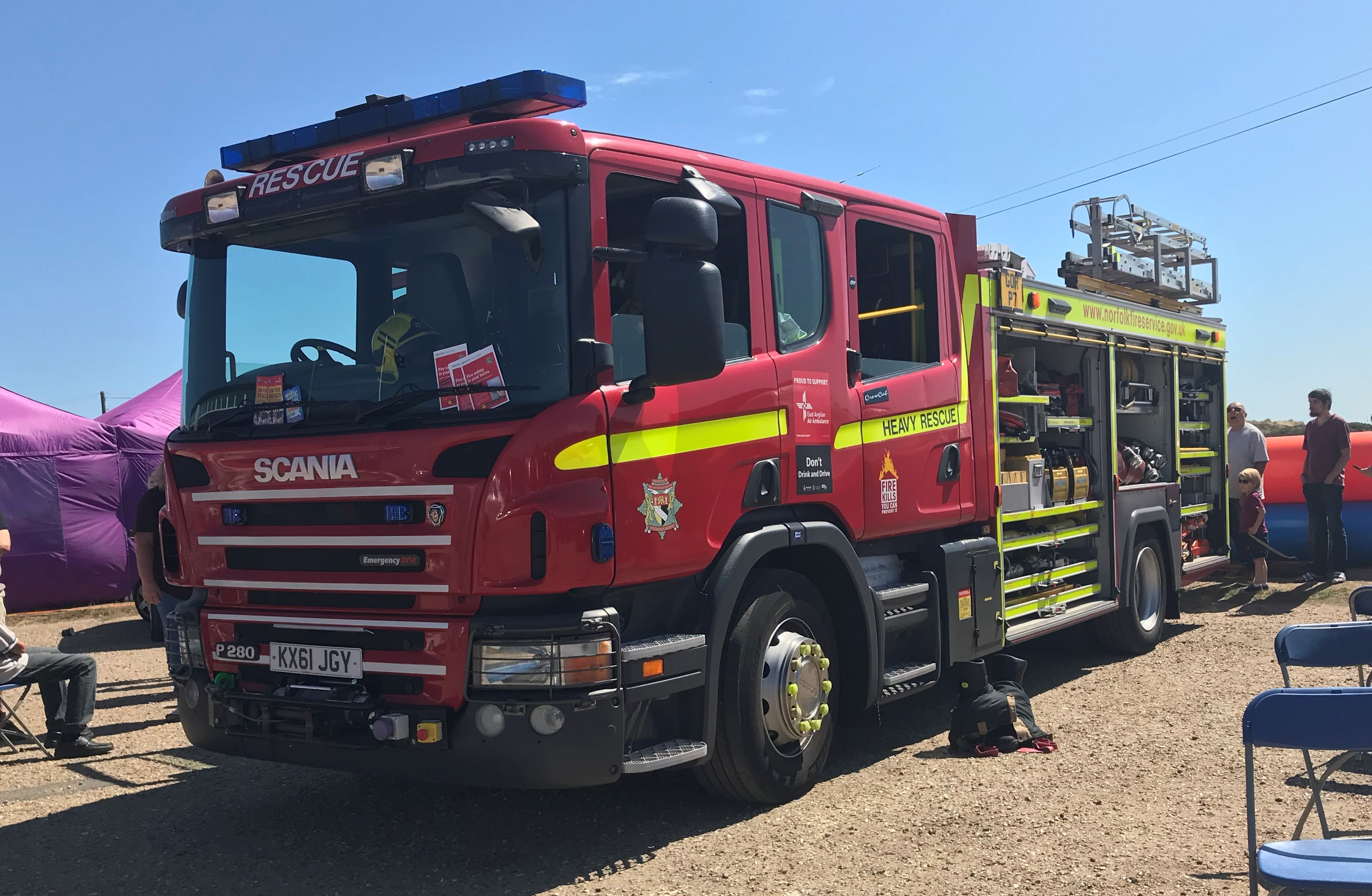
One of Norfolk's Heavy Rescue Units

NFRS operates a range of firefighting appliances, which includes:

- 37 pumping appliances: the standard firefighting vehicle mobilised to all emergency calls. These appliances are equipped with a high-pressure two-stage main pump also capable of making foam via an onboard foam inductor system, two high-pressure hose reels, a set of rescue ladders, a light portable fire pump, four / six breathing apparatus sets (depending on age), two spare breathing air cylinders and hydraulic rescue equipment, as well as other miscellaneous tools.
- 10 rural pumping appliances: similar to the rescue pump but with less rescue equipment and designed for rural areas
- 4 heavy rescue pumps: very similar to the pumping appliance, however more emphasis on rescue operations and incidents.
- 3 aerial ladder platforms: extendible ladder platforms with rescue cages, stretchers and additional lighting, these vehicles provide high-level access and firefighting capability, with a vertical reach of almost 100 ft, almost 80 ft sideways, and up to 55 ft below ground level.
- 5 tactical response vehicles (TRV): they are designed to operate in extreme weather conditions and at difficult to reach locations. They carry a range of specialist equipment to tackle a wide range of incidents. This includes a misting unit and water tank for tackling wildfires and the ability to switch kit for other scenarios, including cutting gear for use at road traffic collisions.
- Urban Search & Rescue: Norfolk Fire and Rescue Service has one of 20 urban search and rescue teams that exist across England and Wales. They can deal with incidents including Confined space rescues, Missing person searches, Rescues from height, Local and national flood response, Water rescues, Bariatric rescue, Animal Rescue and MTA Response. They have a range of specialist vehicles operated by firefighter technicians. They also have a search dog and handler.

== Fire stations ==
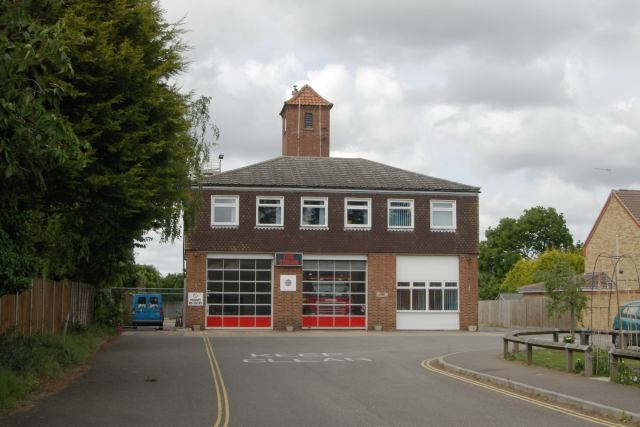
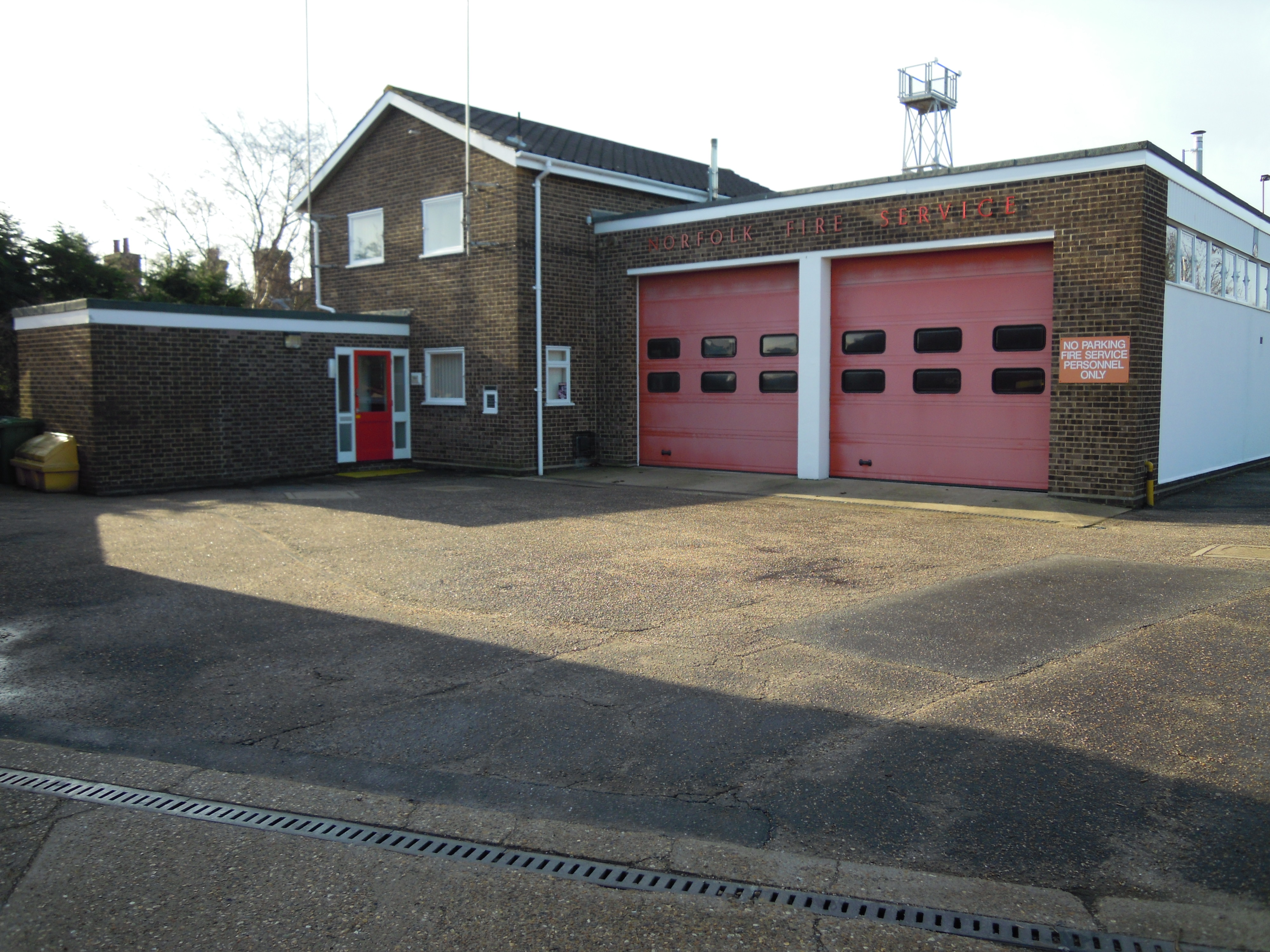
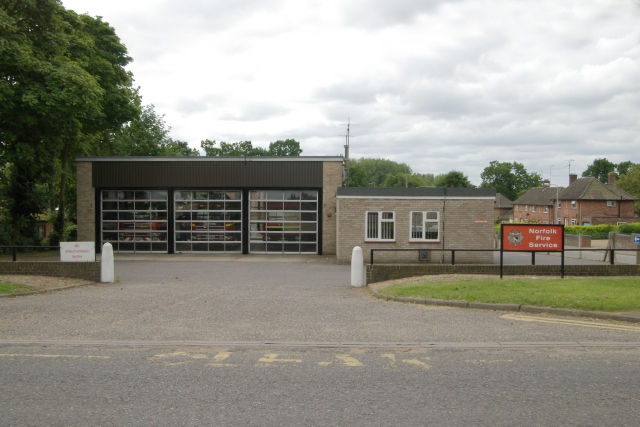
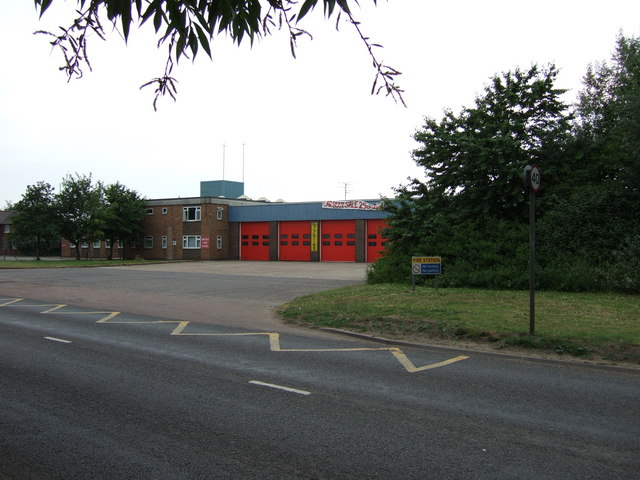
Clockwise from top left: Some of the service's fire stations in Acle, Cromer, King's Lynn and Fakenham

The service has 42 fire stations. The stations are divided into four areas, Central, Eastern, Western and Southern. These stations include:

- 6 wholetime shift stations
- 39 on-call stations
- 2 wholetime day-crewed stations

The stations are crewed by mixture of wholetime (works full time at a fire station to respond immediately), day-crewed (works full time at a fire station only during the day) and on-call/retained (where they live locally and travel to their fire station when their alerter/pager goes off). Some stations are also cross-crewed by a mixture of firefighters from other stations, wholetime and on-call.

== Incidents ==
In 2014–15, NFRS attended 7,285 incidents where 749 people were rescued and 63 fatalities. Mainly consisting of 2,143 fires, 2,809 special services – road traffic collisions (RTC) and other – and 2,333 false alarms which required no further action. The service have noticed a reduction in the number of fires they attend, however an increasing response to RTC incidents on Norfolk's roads.

=== Notable incidents ===
Norwich Assembly Rooms fire 1995

Roy's of Wroxham fire (1995)

Norwich library fire (1994)

- 1991 Thetford – Plastic recycling centre. A large fire which burned for four days
- 1994 Norwich – Norwich Central Library destroyed by fire. The main fire station of Norwich was opposite the library but the crews were already out attending what turned out to be a malicious call. Due to the dramatic spread of the fire the building could not be saved
- 1995 Wroxham – a ten-hour blaze in a department store
- 2011 Great Yarmouth – four men killed in industrial accident; nine fire crews attended
- 2013 Norwich – eleven people injured in low speed train crash at Norwich railway station. The signal box was not alerted to the accident for 24 minutes
- 2014 Fakenham – 90 firefighters attended a fire in a department store
- 2016 Great Yarmouth – 20 plus appliances and 88 fire crews attend large fire on Regent road inside Regent Arcade and Super Bowl UK Regent. Building destroyed.

== See also ==
- 2002-2003 UK firefighter dispute
- History of fire brigades in the United Kingdom
- History of fire safety legislation in the United Kingdom
- List of British firefighters killed in the line of duty
