= Downend =

Downend may refer to:

Places in England

- Downend, Berkshire, a village
- Downend, Isle of Wight
- Downend, South Gloucestershire, a suburb of Bristol
  - Downend air crash
- Downend, a hamlet in the parish of Horsley, Gloucestershire
- Downend, a hamlet in the civil parish of Puriton in Somerset
  - Downend Castle

People

- Richard Downend (born 1945), English cricketer and rugby union player
