= Hoveton =

Village in Norfolk, England

Coordinates: 52.71327°N 1.40960°E

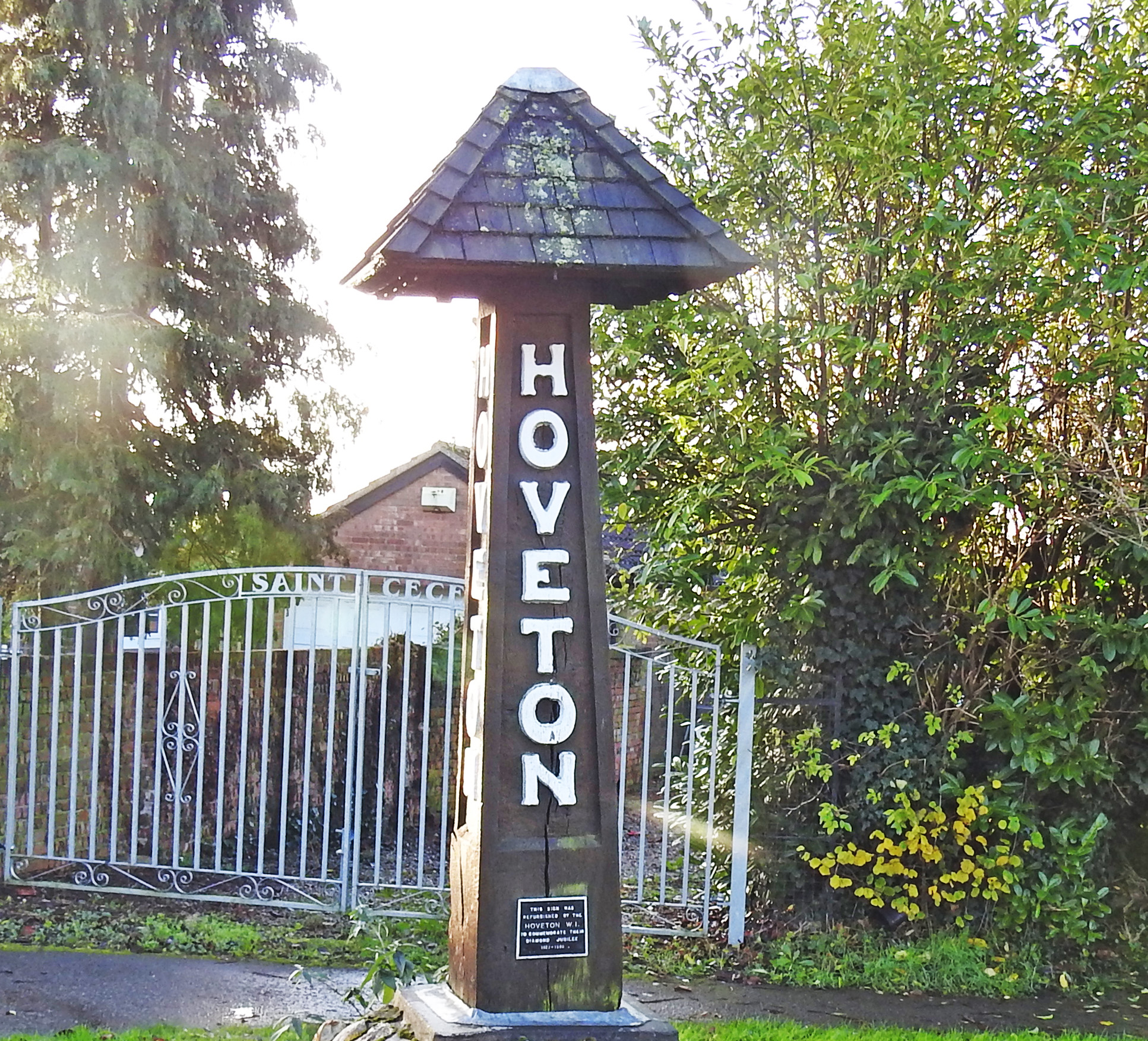
- Hoveton Village Sign

- Location within Norfolk
- Area: 3.90 sq mi (10.1 km^{2})
- Population: 2,127 (2021 census)
  - Density: 545/sq mi (210/km^{2})
- OS grid reference: TG304183
- Civil parish: Hoveton
- District: North Norfolk
- Shire county: Norfolk
- Region: East
- Country: England
- Sovereign state: United Kingdom
- Post town: NORWICH
- Postcode district: NR12
- Dialling code: 01603
- UK Parliament: North Norfolk

Hoveton (pronounced /ˈhɒftən/, "Hofton") is a village and civil parish in the English county of Norfolk, within the Norfolk Broads.

Hoveton is located 7.3 miles (11.7 km) south of North Walsham and 8.1 miles (13.0 km) north-east of Norwich. It is separated from Wroxham by the River Bure.

== History ==
Hoveton's name is of Anglo-Saxon origin and derives from the Old English for Hofa's farmstead.

In the Domesday Book, Hoveton is listed as a settlement of 58 households in the hundred of Tunstead. In 1086, the village was divided between the East Anglian estates of St. Benet's Abbey and Roger of Poitou.

Hoveton & Wroxham Railway Station opened in the village in 1874 and still operates as a stop on the Bittern Line, between Norwich and Sheringham.

== Geography ==
According to the 2021 census, Hoveton has a population of 2,127 people which shows an increase from the 1,759 people recorded in the 2011 census.

Hoveton is located within the Norfolk Broads close to Hoveton Great Broad and Hoveton Little Broad.

== St. John's Church ==
Hoveton's parish church is dedicated to Saint John the Evangelist and dates from the twelfth century. St. John's is located on Horning Road and has been Grade II listed since 1955. The church remains open for Sunday service twice a month.

St. John's features a good collection of seventeenth century stained-glass roundels as well as numerous memorials to the Blofeld family, including one to Captain John S. Blofeld who died in the service of the East India Company near Hyderabad in 1803. There is also a stained-glass window designed by Ninian Comper depicting the Risen Christ.

== Hoveton Hall ==
Hoveton Hall was built between 1809 and 1812 by Humphry Repton for Mrs Christabell Burroughes. Today, the house is in the care of the Buxton family.

== Amenities ==
Broads National Park boat trips leave from Hoveton's Riverside Park. Roys of Wroxham, dubbed "the world's largest village store", has a store in Hoveton which has stood in the village since 1899.

Broadland High Ormiston Academy is located in Hoveton and is part of the Ormiston Academies Trust.

== Notable residents ==
- Anthony Aufrère (1757-1833), antiquary and barrister, born in Hoveton Hall.
- Alan Hunter (1922-2005), crime fiction author, born in Hoveton.
- Sir John Blofeld (b.1932), barrister and judge, born in Hoveton.
- Henry Blofeld OBE (b.1939), journalist and cricket commentator, born in Hoveton.
- Tom Blofeld (b.1964), author and owner of Bewilderwood, born in Hoveton.

== In popular culture ==
The Norfolk landscape painter John Crome, an associate of John Sell Cotman and others of the Norwich School, made an etching of Hoveton around 1812. Today, the painting is held by the National Gallery of Canada.

Dydall's Mill is a tower mill that has been converted to residential use. It is reputedly haunted by the ghost of a millman's daughter that was killed by the sails of the mill.

== Governance ==
Hoveton is part of the electoral ward of Hoveton and Tunstead for local elections and is part of the district of North Norfolk.

The village's national constituency is North Norfolk, which has been represented by the Liberal Democrat Steff Aquarone MP since 2024.

== War Memorial ==
Hoveton's war memorial is a stone plaque in St. John's Church which lists the following names for the First World War:

Rank	Name	Unit	Date of death	Burial/Commemoration
Gnr.	Ernest Hunter	122nd Bty., Royal Garrison Artillery	6 Jun. 1915	Perth Cemetery
Gnr.	Bertie H. Corbyn	282nd Bty., Royal Garrison Artillery	29 Jul. 1917	Maple Leaf Cemetery
Pte.	Robert Wilkinson	8th Bn., Bedfordshire Regiment	19 Apr. 1917	Loos Memorial
Pte.	Ernest J. Hilton	Derbyshire Yeomanry	21 Apr. 1917	Loos Memorial
Pte.	Harry J. Chambers	7th Bn., Norfolk Regiment	4 Jul. 1916	Aveluy Communal Cemetery
Pte.	John R. Felstead	7th Bn., Norfolk Regt.	23 Sep. 1917	Duisans British Cemetery
Pte.	Albert G. Buck	8th Bn., Norfolk Regt.	17 Feb. 1917	Regina Trench Cemetery
Pte.	Alfred J. Day	9th Bn., Norfolk Regt.	29 Jul. 1916	White House Cemetery
Pte.	James Howard	9th Bn., Norfolk Regt.	23 Oct. 1916	Grove Town Cemetery
Pte.	Hugh J. Morter	9th Bn., Norfolk Regt.	15 Sep. 1916	Thiepval Memorial
Pte.	Percy W. Nolleth	31st Bn., Army Training Reserve	8 Apr. 1917	St. John's Churchyard
Pte.	Jonah Corbyn	10th Bn., Yorkshire Regiment	8 Nov. 1916	Vermelles British Cemetery
