= Horning Sailing Club =

Sailing club in Norfolk, England

Horning Sailing Club HSC
- Sport: Sailing
- Official website: horning-sailing.club

HISTORY
- Year of formation: 1910
- Address: Swan Green; Lower Street; Horning; Norfolk; NR12 8AA
- Country: UK

Horning Sailing Club is a sailing club in Horning, Norfolk, England. The club provides dinghy racing, yacht racing, yacht cruising, motor boating, personal watercraft facilities and is a representative for Broadland inland waterways cruising. HSC is an RYA Training Centre and an RYA Sailability Centre.

== Youth ==
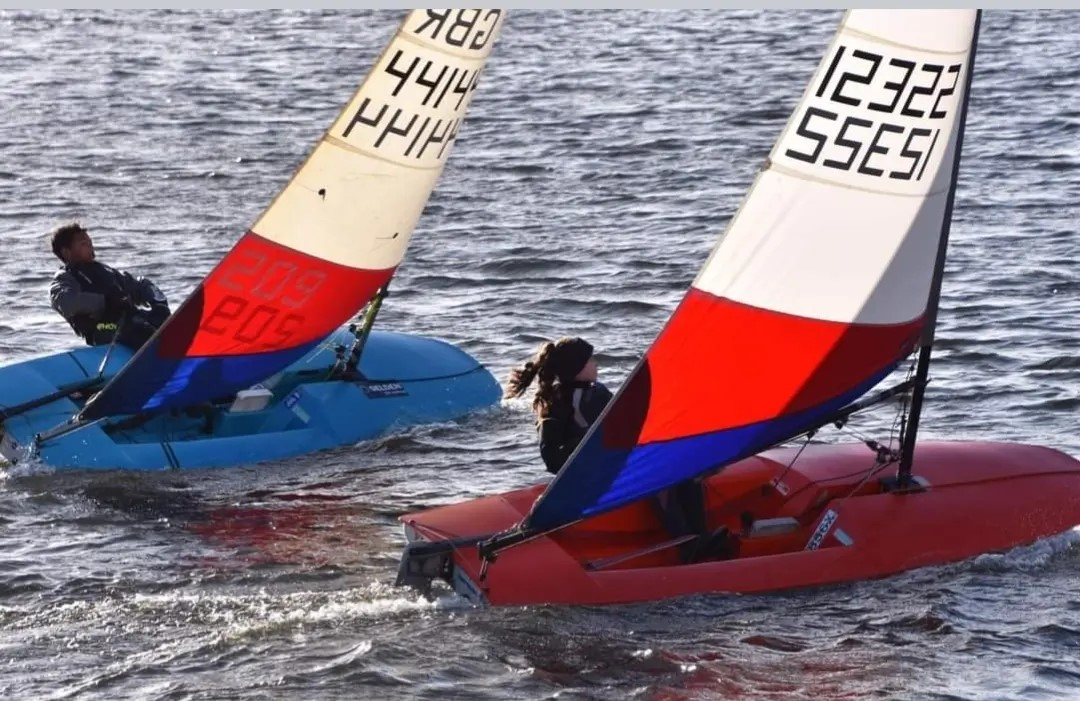
Toppers Racing

Horning Sailing Club provides sailing facilities for junior and youth sailors, including junior specific courses in the training centre. Youth events include the "Sundown Series" which is less formal and an annual youth regatta at the end of the season.

HSC young sailors have gone on to compete at regional, national and international events. Horning Sailing Club enters a team each year into the Annual Broadland Youth Regatta.

== Almanac ==
=== Three Rivers Race ===
The Three Rivers race was established in 1961 where boats have 24hrs to complete a course. Boats race 80 km along three Norfolk rivers: Bure, Thurne and Ant. Over 100 boats enter the race each year.

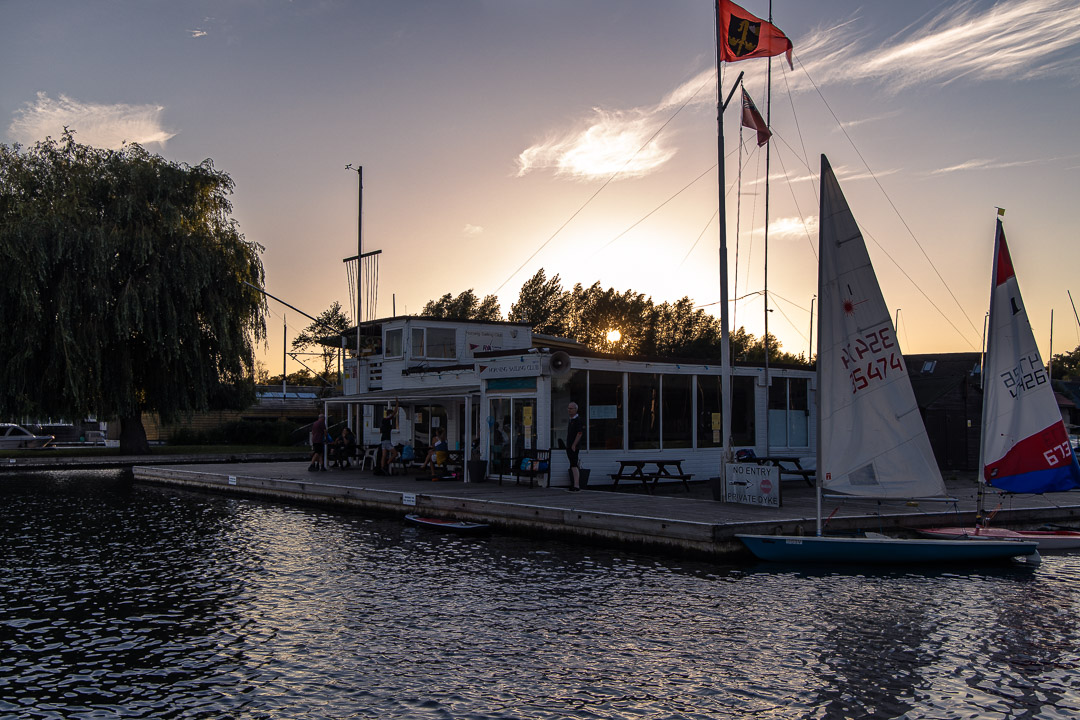
Horning Sailing Club

== See also ==
- Dinghy sailing
- Dinghy racing
- Watersports
- Yachting
- International Council of Yacht Clubs
- British Marine Federation
