= Broadland High Ormiston Academy =

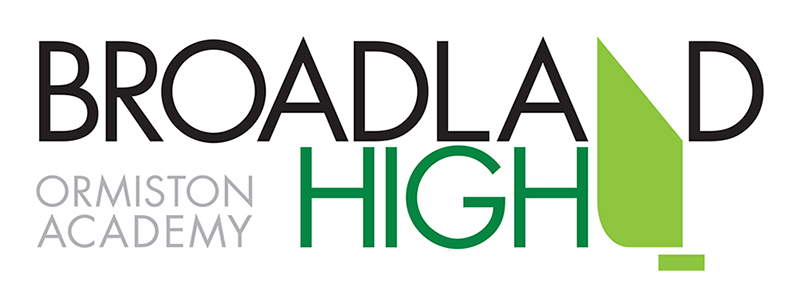

Location
- Tunstead Road; Hoveton, Norfolk, NR12 8QN; England; 52°43′00″N 1°24′51″E

Information
- Type: Academy
- Established: 1958
- Local authority: Norfolk
- Department for Education URN: 146063 Tables
- Ofsted: Reports
- Chair of Governors: Paul Middleditch
- Principal: Matthew Sprake
- Vice Principal: Simon Laycock; Jonny Phipps
- Staff: 100
- Gender: Mixed
- Age: 11 to 16
- Enrolment: 700 pupils
- Colours: Dark green, light green, grey, black
- Website: www.broadlandhighoa.co.uk

Broadland High Ormiston Academy is a rural mixed academy in Hoveton, Norfolk for pupils aged 11 to 16. As of 1 August 2018, the school has been part of Ormiston Academies Trust.

== Community and campus ==
Broadland High is situated on the Broads approximately 7½ miles (12¼ km) north-east of Norwich. The academy has close links with the communities which surround it and takes pupils from feeder schools in Rackheath, Salhouse, Neatishead, Horning, Tunstead and Coltishall as well as Hoveton. It consists of 5 teaching blocks, including dedicated Music, PE and Design and Technology blocks.

== Ofsted and academic performance ==
Broadland has been regularly judged as "good" for overall performance. In its 2016 inspection Ofsted said: "This school continues to be good. Pupils who met with us enthused about the school. Pupils enjoy school and are proud to be part of it. They say that its small size means that everyone knows each other well, friendships are easily forged and staff are always approachable and caring. They value the additional support provided by staff, saying teachers are 'always there' to help and look after them. We found that pupils behave well, show good manners and conduct themselves sensibly and maturely around school."

Results for 2015 showed a marked improvement on previous years, with an increase on progress, compared to previous years. In 2016, the school's Progress 8 score for GCSE results was 0.11 which is in line with the average Progress 8 for schools across England. 66% of students achieved grades A*-C in GCSE English and Maths.

However, due to the COVID-19 pandemic, the school closed temporarily in March 2020, meaning the year 11 pupils did not take GCSES and the grades were published depending on work, progress, etc.
