= List of squadrons in the New Zealand Air Training Corps =

This is a list of units in the New Zealand Air Training Corps. Each unit is led and managed by the Cadet Unit Commander, and their officers and staff.

As of 2025 there are 47 Air Training Corps squadrons in New Zealand.

== Map of New Zealand Air Training Corps Squadrons ==

Squadrons of the New Zealand Air Training Corps

== List of New Zealand Air Training Corps Squadrons ==
Squadron Abbrv.	Unit	Town / City	Region	Area	Coordinates	Logo/Unit Recognition Patch	Commissioned	Website	Notes.
1 SQN	No. 1 (City of Wellington) Squadron	Wellington	Wellington	Central Area	41°18′17″S 174°48′05″E		15 September 1941; 84 years ago	(Archived) - Old Website	
2 SQN	No. 2 (Hutt City) Squadron	Hutt City	Wellington	Central Area	41°13′39″S 174°52′26″E		15 September 1941; 84 years ago		Formerly: No. 2 (Petone) Squadron
3 SQN	No. 3 (Auckland City) Squadron	Auckland	Auckland	Northern Area	36°55′21″S 174°45′15″E		29 September 1941; 84 years ago		
4 SQN	No. 4 (Ardmore) Squadron	Papakura/Ardmore	Auckland	Northern Area	37°02′15″S 174°58′19″E		1958; 68 years ago		Split off of No. 3 Sqn. Formerly: No. 4 (Papakura) Squadron
5 SQN	No. 5 (Rodney District) Squadron	Whangaparāoa	Auckland	Northern Area	36°39′27″S 174°39′10″E		4 June 1998; 27 years ago		Split off of No. 3 Sqn.
6 SQN	No. 6 (North Shore) Squadron	North Shore	Auckland	Northern Area	36°48′49″S 174°47′47″E		1959; 67 years ago		Split off of No. 3 Sqn. Formerly: No. 6 (North Shore City) Squadron
7 SQN	No. 7 (City of Hamilton) Squadron	Hamilton	Waikato	Northern Area	37°44′44″S 175°09′35″E		September 1941; 84 years ago		
8 SQN	No. 8 (City of New Plymouth) Squadron	New Plymouth	Taranaki	Central Area	39°04′54″S 174°05′15″E		1941; 85 years ago		
9 SQN	No. 9 (City of Wanganui) Squadron	Wanganui	Manawatū-Whanganui	Central Area	39°56′13″S 175°02′49″E		2 December 1941; 84 years ago	Archived	
10 SQN	No. 10 (City of Palmerston North) Squadron	Palmerston North	Manawatū-Whanganui	Central Area	40°22′13″S 175°37′52″E		1941; 82 years ago	Archived	
11 SQN	No. 11 (District of Hastings) Squadron	Hastings	Manawatū-Whanganui	Central Area	39°39′08″S 176°46′00″E		December 1939; 86 years ago	Archived	
12 SQN	No. 12 (City of Invercargill) Squadron	Invercargill	Southland	Southern Area	46°24′07″S 168°20′34″E		Unknown	Archived	
13 SQN	No. 13 (City of Napier) Squadron	Napier	Hawke's Bay	Central Area	39°29′01″S 176°55′10″E		1941; 85 years ago		
14 SQN	No. 14 (City of Gisborne) Squadron	Gisborne	Gisborne	Central Area	38°39′40″S 177°59′02″E		Unknown		
15 SQN	No. 15 (District of Timaru) Squadron	Timaru	Canterbury	Southern Area	44°20′58″S 171°13′51″E		31 January 1942; 84 years ago		
16 SQN	No. 16 (City of Tauranga) Squadron	Tauranga	Bay of Plenty	Northern Area	37°42′00″S 176°09′45″E		1971; 55 years ago		
17 SQN	No. 17 (City of Christchurch) Squadron	Christchurch	Canterbury	Southern Area	43°32′57″S 172°32′50″E		January 1942; 84 years ago		
18 SQN	No. 18 (Avon) Squadron	Avon	Canterbury	Southern Area	43°32′57″S 172°32′51″E		1960; 66 years ago		
19 SQN	No. 19 (Auckland) Squadron	Auckland	Auckland	Northern Area	36°51′51″S 174°44′51″E		1941 and 1964; 62 years ago		
20 SQN	No. 20 (City of Whangarei) Squadron	Whangārei	Northland	Northern Area	35°46′02″S 174°21′57″E		1941; 85 years ago		
21 SQN	No. 21 (Masterton District) Squadron	Masterton	Wellington	Central Area	40°58′16″S 175°37′58″E		1942; 84 years ago	Archived	
22 SQN	No. 22 (City of Upper Hutt) Squadron	Upper Hutt	Wellington	Central Area	41°08′41″S 75°02′32″E		Unknown		
23 SQN	No. 23 (Nelson) Squadron	Nelson	Nelson	Southern Area	41°17′49″S 173°13′40″E		20 July 1942; 83 years ago	(Archived) - Old Website	
24 SQN	No. 24 (Ashburton) Squadron	Ashburton	Canterbury	Southern Area	43°54′17″S 171°48′19″E		18 October 1942; 83 years ago	Archived	
25 SQN	No. 25 (District of Kaikohe) Squadron	Kaikohe	Northland	Northern Area	35°24′24″S 173°47′58″E		Unknown		
26 SQN	No. 26 (Oamaru) Squadron	Oamaru	Otago	Southern Area	45°06′01″S 170°57′56″E		Unknown		
27 SQN	No. 27 (Blenheim) Squadron	Blenheim	Marlborough	Southern Area	41°30′42″S 173°52′18″E		16 November 1942; 83 years ago	Archived	
28 SQN	No. 28 (Gore) Squadron	Gore	Southland	Southern Area	46°06′04″S 168°56′50″E		Unknown		
29 SQN	No. 29 (Rotorua) Squadron	Rotorua	Bay of Plenty	Northern Area	38°07′46″S 176°14′20″E		September 1941; 84 years ago		
30 SQN	No. 30 (Hobsonville) Squadron	Hobsonville	Auckland	Northern Area	36°47′22″S 174°37′04″E		17 September 1960; 65 years ago		Formerly: No. 30 (Waitakere City) Squadron
31 SQN	No. 31 (Morrinsville) Squadron	Morrinsville	Waikato	Northern Area	37°39′37″S 175°31′40″E		July 1979; 46 years ago		
32 SQN	No. 32 (Borough of Feilding) Squadron	Feilding	Manawatū-Whanganui	Central Area	40°15′27″S 175°36′08″E		1968; 58 years ago		
33 SQN	No. 33 (Westport) Squadron	Westport	West Coast	Southern Area	41°49′34″S 171°37′33″E		Unknown		
34 SQN	No. 34 (South Waikatio District) Squadron	Tokoroa	Waikato	Northern Area	38°13′34″S 175°50′56″E		12 February 1985; 41 years ago		Formerly: No. 34 (Tokoroa) Squadron
35 SQN	No. 35 (Whakatane) Squadron	Whakatane	Bay of Plenty	Northern Area	37°58′01″S 176°58′49″E		Unknown	Archived	
36 SQN	No. 36 (Greymouth) Squadron	Greymouth	West Coast	Southern Area	42°27′00″S 171°11′44″E		July 1943; 82 years ago		
37 SQN	No. 37 (Thames) Squadron	Thames	Waikato	Northern Area	37°09′26″S 175°33′07″E		23 March 1963; 63 years ago		
38 SQN	No. 38 (Wigram) Squadron	Wigram	Canterbury	Southern Area	43°32′57″S 172°32′49″E		1980; 46 years ago		Formerly: No. 38 (Waimairi) Squadron
40 SQN	No. 40 (Howick) Squadron	Howick	Auckland	Northern Area	36°54′05″S 174°54′11″E		23 November 1981; 44 years ago	(Archived) - Old Website	Formerly: No. 40 (Manukau) Squadron
41 SQN	No. 41 (City of Porirua) Squadron	Porirua	Wellington	Central Area	41°05′57″S 174°51′57″E		25 May 1980; 45 years ago	(Archived) - Old Website	Formerly: No. 41 (Kapi-Mana) Squadron
42 SQN	No. 42 (City of Dunedin) Squadron	Dunedin	Otago	Southern Area	45°53′25″S 170°29′56″E		Unknown	Archived	Formerly: No. 42 (Cargill) Squadron
48 SQN	No. 48 (District of Stratford) Squadron	Stratford	Taranaki	Central Area	39°20′26″S 174°17′19″E		Unknown		
49 SQN	No. 49 (District of Kapiti) Squadron	Kāpiti Coast	Wellington	Central Area	40°54′05″S 174°59′29″E		2 April 1988; 37 years ago		
50 SQN	No. 50 (Alexandra) Squadron	Alexandra	Otago	Southern Area	45°11′18″S 169°19′12″E		1984; 42 years ago		
57 SQN	No. 57 (Dargaville) Squadron	Dargaville	Northland	Northern Area	35°56′24″S 173°53′38″E		Unknown		
64 SQN	No. 64 (Kaitaia) Squadron	Kaitaia	Northland	Northern Area	35°07′04″S 173°16′10″E		October 1942; 83 years ago		
88 SQN	No. 88 (District of Waimakariri) Squadron	Rangiora	Canterbury	Southern Area	43°17′16″S 172°32′27″E		May 2016; 9 years ago		Formerly: No. 88 (Rangiora) Squadron

== Former Units ==
Former Units of the New Zealand Air Training Corps
Unit Name	Town / City	Region	Coordinates	Commissioned	Date of Disbandment	Notes.
No. 43 (Waihi) Squadron	Waihi	Northern Area	37°23′30″S 175°50′30″E		2006	
No. 44 (Paeroa) Squadron	Paeroa	Northern Area	37°22′20″S 175°40′55″E		2006	
No. 45 (Balclutha) Squadron	Balclutha	Southern Area				
No. 46 (MacKenzie) Squadron	MacKenzie	Southern Area				
No. 47 (District of Hawera) Squadron	Hāwera	Central Area			2006	
No. 65 (Kawerau) Squadron	Kawerau	Northern Area	38°05′27″S 176°42′00″E	Unknown	February 2025	In Recess
No. 75 (Arawa) Squadron	Rotorua	Northern Area	38°07′46″S 176°14′20″E	29 December 1981	February 2025 - 43 Years	In Recess Archived
Kelson High School Cadets (No. 72 School Unit ATC)	Lower Hutt	Central Area				
Kelston High School Cadets (No. 27 School Unit ATC)	Auckland	Northern Area				
Tapawera District High School Cadets (ATC)	Tapawera	Southern Area				

== See also ==
- New Zealand Air Training Corps
- New Zealand Cadet Forces
