= Roys of Wroxham =

Group of department stores

Coordinates: 52.7127°N 1.41°E

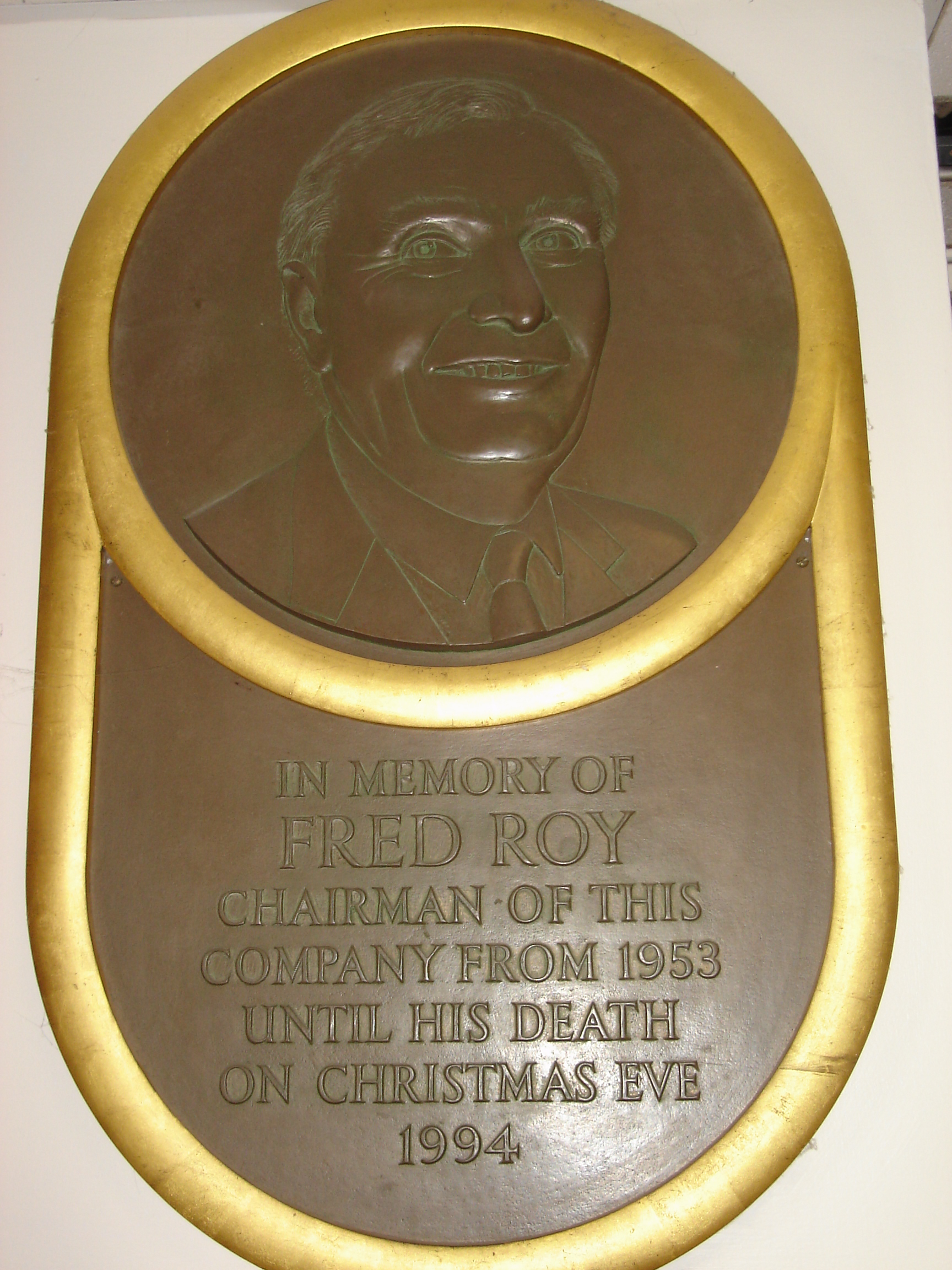
- Plaque of Fred Roy
- Type: Private
- Industry: Retail
- Founded: 1895; 131 years ago in Cottishall, Norfolk, England
- Founders: Alfred Roy; Arnold Roy
- Headquarters: Hoveton, Norfolk, England
- Area served: Norfolk; Suffolk
- Owner: Roy family
- Number of employees: 900
- Website: www.roys.co.uk

Roys of Wroxham is a family owned group of general stores based in Hoveton, Norfolk. Following a competition in the early 1930s, the store uses the motto "The World's Largest Village Store" in its advertising and literature.

== History ==
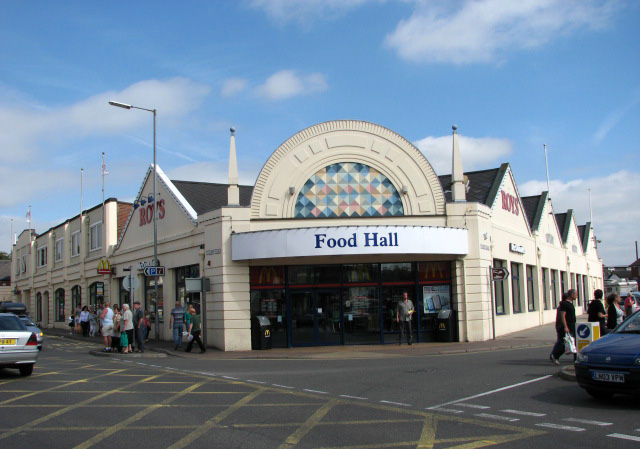
Roys Food Hall in Hoveton, Norfolk, 2008

Roys was founded in 1895 when brothers Alfred and Arnold Roy opened their general store in the village of Coltishall. In 1899, a second store was opened in Hoveton. Following the deaths of the founders in the 1950s the business passed to Alfred's children with Fred Roy being appointed chairman and managing director. After his death in 1994, his brother Peter succeeded him as chairman of the board. He served as chairman until his death in 2004, with his sons Edward and Paul having joined the board of directors prior. In 1995, there was a fire in the Wroxham Roys branch, costing the company over 5 million pounds.

== Branches ==
=== Current ===
- Hoveton
- Beccles
- Norwich, adjacent to the former Anglia Square
- Bowthorpe, Norwich
- North Walsham
- Dereham
- Thetford
- Sudbury

=== Former ===
- Eaton, Norwich (until 1995; now Waitrose)
- Bury St. Edmunds (until 2007; subsequently Wilko)
