= John Blofeld (judge) =

English barrister and judge (1932–2025)

Sir John Christopher Calthorpe Blofeld DL (11 July 1932 – 30 November 2025) was an English barrister and High Court judge.

== Life and career ==
Blofeld was born at Hoveton Home Farm in Norfolk. His father was at Eton with Ian Fleming and his surname is believed to have been the inspiration for the name of James Bond supervillain Ernst Stavro Blofeld. He was the elder brother of cricket commentator Henry Blofeld and the father of author Tom Blofeld. He was a distant relative of the cricketer the Hon. Freddie Calthorpe. His name was used as the inspiration by Ian Fleming for the name of Ernst Stavro Blofeld in the James Bond series of books, which came about from Fleming seeing his name on the membership list at Boodle's when looking for a villainous sounding surname. Blofeld himself indulged in the humour of it by once addressing a barrister whose name was Bond in court, by stroking the ermine on his robe like a cat and saying "We meet at last, Mr Bond".

He was educated at Sunningdale School, Eton, and King's College, Cambridge. In 1961, he married Judith A.H. Mitchell (1932–2013), and they lived at Hoveton House, Hoveton.

Blofeld played cricket for Norfolk against the Kent Second XI in the Minor Counties Championship in 1957.

He was a High Court judge from 1990 to 2001, assigned to the Queen's Bench Division. In 2000, he was one of the appeal judges to release the M25 Three. He was Master of the Mercers' Company in 2003.

Blofeld died on 30 November 2025, at the age of 93.

== Motto ==
Coat of arms of John Blofeld

Motto
Domino Quid Reddam
