= Autism Anglia =

British charitable organisation

Autism Anglia is an organisation and registered charity that provides services to those affected by autism in Essex, Suffolk, Norfolk and Cambridge. It began life in 1973 when Anthony Boobier discovered there were no specialist autism services for his newly diagnosed son. Its first establishment ( Doucecroft School) opened in 1977 and it opened adult services in 1983 when the original children grew up and it was realised that there was no specialised adult autism provision for them. In 2008, The Essex Autistic Society took over the Norfolk Autistic Community Housing Association and the Norfolk Autistic Society and changed the name of the new charity to Autism Anglia to better reflect the enlarged area of operation. In 2013 Autism Anglia took over the Cambridge-based charity East Anglian Autistic Support Trust (EAST).

Its head office is in Colchester, Essex, and it has local offices in Dereham, Norfolk. Autism Anglia provides education, care and support to people with autism from all across the United Kingdom. It also provides Further Education services, Adult Residential, Supported Living, Outreach and Family Support.

In October 2007, with encouragement and support from the three county police forces, Autism Anglia introduced an Alert Card scheme in Essex, Suffolk and Norfolk. The card provides an easy and discreet way of explaining the holder's possibly unusual behaviour. In March 2009 the scheme was extended into Cambridgeshire, Bedfordshire and Hertfordshire with the support of the local police forces. The cards are designed to be easily identifiable to emergency services and offer some simple advice, the person's name and emergency contact details.

Either directly through its schools, adult residential homes, adult day centres, supported living, outreach services or indirectly through its family support teams, Autism Anglia now provides help to over 5,000 people with autism and their families in East Anglia. It also provides training and support to police and other emergency services to develop a better understanding of autism spectrum conditions.

== Fundraising events ==
In March of each year, the charity runs its Silly Sock Day, in which fundraisers adorn their silliest socks for the charity.
