= List of keelboat classes designed before 1970 =

The following is a list of established keelboat classes, particularly smaller ones (below ~10 metres (33 ft) length and/or intended primarily for day-sailing), designed before 1970.

== One-design classes ==
| Year | Name | Length | Designer | Builder | Origins | Fleets | Ref |
|---|---|---|---|---|---|---|---|
| 1886 | Bembridge Redwing mk1 | 6.73 m (22 ft 1 in) | Charles E. Nicholson | Camper and Nicholsons | Bembridge IOW | not active | |
| 1895 | Cork Harbour One Design | 8.99 m (29 ft 6 in) | William Fife Junior(III) | Carrigaloe Gridiron Works Company (first 6, of 12 total) | Royal Cork Yacht Club | active (at least 5 remaining) | |
| 1896 | Colleen Class | 6.71 m (22 ft 0 in) | James E. Doyle | Local yards, and latterly (~2009 onwards), Novatecnia, Buenos Aires, Argentina | Dublin Bay Sailing Club | not active | |
| 1896 | Solent O.D. | 10.13 m (33 ft 3 in) | H.W.White | 23 Whites of Cowes | Members of RYS & Island Sailing Club | not active | |
| 1897 | Belfast Lough One-Design Class | 11.35 m (37 ft 3 in) | William Fife III | J.Hilditch at Carrickfergus | Royal Ulster Yacht Club | not active | |
| 1897 | Howth 17 | 5.18 m (17 ft 0 in) (Lwl) | W. Herbert Boyd | J.Hilditch at Carrickfergus: 5 (1897), 3 (1900), also 2 (1988), 1 (2009) | Howth Sailing Club | active | |
| 1898 | Yorkshire One Design | 7.77 m (25 ft 6 in) | Mr. J. S. Helyer | Field & Co of Itchen Ferry, Southampton | Royal Yorkshire Yacht Club | A few still at Bridlington | |
| 1899 | Clyde One Design | 15.24 m (50 ft 0 in) | Alfred Mylne | 5 built | Clyde Corinthians | Not Active; 1 Remains | |
| 1901 | Fairy Class | 4.88 m (16 ft 0 in) | Linton Hope | 15 originally built by Hilditch & further 11 for Lough Erne YC | Royal North of Ireland Yacht Club | active | |
| 1903 | Dublin Bay 21 | 9.91 m (32 ft 6 in) | Alfred Mylne | 7 built, Hollwey (4), Kelly (2) and Clancy (1) | Dublin Bay Sailing Club | not active | |
| 1905 | Fleetwood Jewel Class | | | originally built by Crossfields | Blackpool & Fleetwood YC | | |
| 1907 | Seaview Mermaid | 7.62 m (25 ft 0 in) | GU Laws | 8 Woodnutts Yard | Sea View Yacht Club | Not Active; 2 Remain | |
| 1908 | Yare & Bure One Design | 6.10 m (20 ft 0 in) | Ernest Woods | 1–69 (wood) Ernest Woods, 70–94 Herbert Woods (the designer's nephew) (wood), 95–123 (GRP) Kingsley Farrington, 124–140 (GRP) S. Evans, R&P Richardson, P. Dennis, C. Buttivant | Yare Sailing Club | Norfolk Broads Yacht Club, Norfolk Punt Club, Horning Sailing Club, East Anglian Cruising Club | |
| 1908 | Royal Mersey Restricted class | | | | Royal Mersey | | |
| 1910 | Star | 6.91 m (22 ft 8 in) | Francis Sweisguth | first 22 built by Ike Smith | USA | Olympic class 1932-2012: >8,400 built, >2,000 active, 170 fleets | |
| 1910 | Yarmouth One Design | 6.40 m (21 ft 0 in) | Henry Longmore | 11 by Theo Smith in Yarmouth (1910); 2 by Woodnutts in St. Helens | Yarmouth, IOW | Yarmouth | |
| 1911 | XOD | 6.10 m (20 ft 0 in) | Alfred Westmacott | Woodnutts Boatyard, others | Bembridge IOW | Solent & Poole | |
| 1913 | East Coast One Design (E.C.O.D.) | 9.14 m (30 ft 0 in) | G U Laws | W. King & Sons | Originally Royal Corinthian Yacht Club | Thames Estuary Rivers Blackwater & Crouch | |
| 1913 | Stjärnbåt | 5.50 m (18.0 ft) | Janne Jacobsson | about 530 built | Royal Gothenburg Yacht Club | Sweden | |
| 1914 | Wianno Senior | 7.62 m (25 ft 0 in) | Crosby Yard | Crosby Yard | Nantucket Sound | USA ita | |
| 1916 | Royal Mersey Rivers class | 7.01 m (23 ft 0 in) | | Crossfields of Arnside | Royal Mersey YC | based on Fleetwood Jewel Class | |
| 1922 | Seaview Mermaid | 7.47 m (24 ft 6 in) | Alfred Westmacott | 10 by Souters of Cowes (Wood) | Sea View Yacht Club | Not Active | |
| 1922 | Hillyard 6-Ton | 8.23 m (27 ft 0 in) | David Hillyard | | | | |
| 1923 | St Mawes One Design | 4.88 m (16 ft 0 in) | William Francis Peters | Ballasted Centreplate Dayboat- 45 | St Mawes Sailing Club | Falmouth, Flushing, and St Mawes | |
| 1923 | Solent Sunbeam | 7.92 m (26 ft 0 in) | Alfred Westmacott | 60 (Wood); 5 by Mark Downer (GRP) | Itchenor & Falmouth | | |
| 1924 | Gareloch One Design | 7.32 m (24 ft 0 in) | Ewing McGruer | McGruers | | Royal Northern and Clyde Yacht Club | |
| 1924 | West Solent Restricted Class | 10.52 m (34 ft 6 in) | H. Jacobs and H.G. May | 32 by Berthon Boat Company, 5 exported to Argentina "Los Indios" Class | W Mersea YC etc. | Active (East Anglian coast) | |
| 1924 | Deben Cherub | 6.40 m (21 ft 0 in) | | | | active: ~17 extant | |
| 1926 | Conway Fife One Design | 7.42 m (24 ft 4 in) | W. and R.B. Fife | 12 by A.M. Dickie & Sons of Bangor (Wood); 22 by Various Builder (GRP) | Royal Anglesey Yacht Club | | |
| 1928 | Conway One Design | 6.10 m (20 ft 0 in) | W H Rowlands | | Conway Yacht Club | active | |
| 1928 | Scottish Islands One Design | 8.53 m (28 ft 0 in) | Alfred Mylne | McGruers at Clynder | | 5 on the Clyde, 4 elsewhere (2013) | |
| 1928 | Atlantic One-Design | 9.35 m (30 ft 8 in) | Starling Burgess | | | Cedar Point YC, Cold Spring Harbor Beach Club, Kollegewidgwok YC, Madison Beach Club, Niantic Bay YC | |
| 1929 | Troy-class boats | 8.86 m (29 ft 1 in) | Archie Watty | Archie Watty; Marcus Lewis | Fowey | Fowey | |
| 1929 | Dragon | 8.86 m (29 ft 1 in) | Johan Anker | Multiple | Many places worldwide | active | |
| 1929 | Mälar 22 | 9.5 m (31 ft) | Gustaf Estlander | | Mälarens Seglarförbund | Sweden | |
| 1931 | Yonne class | 7.92 m (26 ft 0 in) | Thomas Harrison Butler | | 8 | | |
| 1932 | Stuart Knockabout | 8.53 m (28 ft 0 in) | Francis Herreshoff | Wooden Boats – Various; GRP Boats – Stuart Knockabout LLC | GRP; Wooden; Total 78 | USA | |
| 1932 | Royal Burnham One Design | 6.20 m (20 ft 4 in) | Norman Dallimore | 24 | | active | |
| 1932 | Blackwater Sloop | 5.49 m (18 ft 0 in) | Dan Webb and Feasey of Maldon | | >60 | | |
| 1933 | Lymington-L-Class | 7.09 m (23 ft 3 in) | Laurent Giles | Initial boats by Elkins, Christchurch | Lymington | 18 built | |
| 1933 | Mälar 30 | 10 m (33 ft) | Lage Eklund | | Mälarens Seglarförbund | Sweden | |
| 1933 | Tumlare | 8.31 m (27 ft 3 in) | Knud Reimers | Various | | "At least 200" "Some 600" "660" | |
| 1934 | Victory | 6.30 m (20 ft 8 in) | Alfred Westmacott | Portsmouth Harbour Racing and Sailing Association Approx 60 (Wood); 6 (GRP) | | Portsmouth and Gibraltar | |
| 1935 | Royal Corinthian One Design | 6.96 m (22 ft 10 in) | Harry Smith | Burnham Yacht Building Company | Royal Corinthian Yacht Club | Burnham | |
| 1935 | Royal Mersey Mylne Class | 7.54 m (24 ft 9 in) | Alfred Mylne | | Royal Mersey Yacht Club | active | |
| 1936 | Bembridge One Design | 6.10 m (20 ft 0 in) approx | Alfred Westmacott | Westmacott and Woodnutts | Bembridge Sailing Club | active | |
| 1936 | Vertue | 7.70 m (25 ft 3 in) | Laurent Giles | | | 275 | |
| 1937 | International One Design | 10.06 m (33 ft 0 in) | Bjarne Aas | | Long Island Sound- later, fleets in Norway, UK, Bermuda, Canada and US | 285 yachts listed on register, 12 fleets in 5 countries; over 150 yachts racing | the first class to be recognized by ISAF as a "Classic" One Design Class |
| 1937 | Deben 4-ton | 6.71 m (22 ft 0 in) | | Claude Whisstock | | | |
| 1937 | Bembridge Redwing mk2 | 8.46 m (27 ft 9 in) | Charles E. Nicholson | 20 by Camper & Nicholson (Wood); Approx. 35 by Various (GRP) | Bembridge | Bembridge Sailing Club; Poole | |
| 1937 | Royal Harwich One Design | 6.10 m (20 ft 0 in) | Robert Clark and Austin Farrar | | Royal Harwich Yacht Club | | |
| 1937 | Loch Long One Design | 6.40 m (21 ft 0 in) | James Croll | James Colquhoun & Sons of Dunoon; 11 other builders, one(Aldeburgh Boatyard) still active. | Loch Long Sailing Club | at Aldeburgh Yacht Club and Cove Sailing Club | |
| 1938 | Neptunkryssare | 9 m (30 ft) | Lage Eklund | | | Sweden | |
| 1939 | Dublin Bay 24 | 11.51 m (37 ft 9 in) | Alfred Mylne | Isle of Bute | Royal Alfred Yacht Club | Villefranche-sur-Mer | 'Design Mid Thirties; first delivered 1946' |
| 1942 | Nordic Folkboat | 7.62 m (25 ft 0 in) | | | | | |
| 1943 | Swallow | 7.62 m (25 ft 0 in) | Isaac Thomas Thornycroft | | | | |
| 1944 | K 6 | 6.10 m (20.0 ft) | Einar Ohlson | | Svenska Kosterbåtsförbundet | Sweden | |
| 1945 | Dauntless | 6.71 m (22 ft 0 in) | | | | | |
| 1945 | Glen | 7.62 m (25 ft 0 in) | Alfred Mylne | Bangor boatyard; some 39 built | Dublin Bay Sailing Club | Dublin Bay Sailing Club active fleet | |
| 1946 | Bluenose | 7.14 m (23 ft 5 in) | William James Roué | | | Canadian | |
| 1947 | Flying Fifteen | 6.10 m (20 ft 0 in) | Uffa Fox | | | active | |
| 1948 | Mälar 25 | 10 m (33 ft) | Erik Nilsson | | Mälarens Seglarförbund | Sweden | |
| 1955 | Revised-L-Class | 7.21 m (23 ft 8 in) | Laurent Giles | Initial boat by Jefferson Bros, Hessle, various Solent yards followed | | 9 built in UK | |
| 1955 | South Coast One-Design (SCOD) | 7.90 m (25 ft 11 in) | Charles A. Nicholson (Note: Nephew of Charles Ernest Nicholson, son of his brother Arthur) | Burnes, Clare Lallow, Camper & Nicholson, Woodnutts and WA Souter | | 106 built 1955–1970 | |
| 1955 | Kestrel 22 | 6.71 m (22 ft 0 in) | J Francis Jones | | | 100+ built 1955–1970 | |
| 1958 | Hilbre One Design | 5.11 m (16 ft 9 in) | Alan Buchanan | 55 | West Kirby Sailing Club | | |
| 1959 | Shark 24 | 7.32 m (24 ft 0 in) | George Hinterhoeller | | Great Lakes region | active | |
| 1959 | Stella | 7.85 m (25 ft 9 in) | Kim Holman | | | 100+ built | |
| 1960s | Warsash One Design | 8.13 m (26 ft 8 in) | Fred Parker | Russell Marine, Leigh on Sea | | | |
| 1961 | Daring | 10.11 m (33 ft 2 in) | Arthur Robb | 40 | Cowes IOW | | |
| 1961 | Finesse 21 | 6.40 m (21 ft 0 in) | Laurie Harbottel | Alan Platt | | 79 built | |
| 1962 | Seaview Mermaid | | Arthur Robb | 13 by Various (GRP) | Sea View Yacht Club | Seaview, Isle of Wight | |
| 1962 | Rossiter Pintail | 8.31 m (27 ft 3 in) | Hugh Rossiter | | | | |
| 1962 | Alberg 30 | 9.22 m (30 ft 3 in) | Carl Alberg | Whitby Boat Works | Great Lakes, Chesapeake Bay | active | |
| 1965 | Soling | 8.13 m (26 ft 8 in) | Jan Herman Linge | | | | |
| 1965 | Tempest | 6.65 m (21 ft 10 in) | Ian Proctor | | | active | |
| 1966 | Piper One Design | 6.53 m (21 ft 5 in) | David Boyd | | Sandbanks | Holy Loch Sailing Club; Royal Gourock Yacht Club | |
| 1966 | Etchells | 9.14 m (30 ft 0 in) | E. W. Etchells | | | | |
| 1967 | Yngling | 6.38 m (20 ft 11 in) | Jan Herman Linge | | | | |
| 1967 | Ajax 23 | 7.01 m (23 ft 0 in) | Oliver Lee | Halmatic; 24 | RHYC | active | |
| 1967 | H-boat | 8.26 m (27 ft 1 in) | Hans Groop; Paul Elvstrøm (re-design) | over 5000 made; manufacturers in Scandinavia and N Europe | | active | |
| 1967 | Squib | 5.79 m (19 ft 0 in) | Oliver Lee | Over 800 | | Active UK | One-design with a strong class association |
| 1969 | Spækhugger | 7.44 m (24.4 ft) | Peter Bruun | Flipper Scow, Sweden | | Denmark | |

== Rating-rule designs ==
| Year | Name | Length | Rule | Origins | Fleets | Ref |
|---|---|---|---|---|---|---|
| 1904 | Windermere 17s | 5.18 m (17 ft 0 in) LWL | Restricted Development Class | Windermere | Active | |
| 1906 | 6.5 Metre | | Jauge chemin de fer | | | (Note: see also the related 8.5 Metre class - 54 boats built in France, primarily sailing in Southern Brittany) |
| 1907 | 12 Metre | | International rule | | active | |
| 1907 | 15 Metre | | International rule | | | |
| 1907 | 19 Metre | | International rule | | | |
| 1907 | 23 Metre | | International rule | | not active | |
| 1907 | 6 Metre | | International rule | | active | |
| 1907 | 7 Metre | | International rule | | | |
| 1907 | 8 Metre | | International rule | | active | |
| 1908 | 22m² Skerry cruiser | | Square meter rule | | Sweden | |
| 1908 | 30m² Skerry cruiser | | Square meter rule | | Sweden | |
| 1908 | 45m² Skerry cruiser | | Square meter rule | | | |
| 1908 | 55m² Skerry cruiser | | Square meter rule | | | |
| 1912 | 38m² Skerry cruiser | | Square meter rule | | | |
| 1913 | 15m² Skerry cruiser | | Square meter rule | | | |
| 1913 | 75m² Skerry cruiser | | Square meter rule | | | |
| 1913 | 95m² Skerry cruiser | | Square meter rule | | | |
| 1913 | 120m² Skerry cruiser | | Square meter rule | | | |
| 1913 | 150m² Skerry cruiser | | Square meter rule | | | |
| 1913 | 40m² Skerry cruiser | | Square meter rule | | Sweden | |
| 1929 | 5 Metre | | French variant of the International rule | | active | |
| 1937 | 5.5 Metre | | French variant of the International rule | | active | |
| | Sharpie Classes | | | | | |

== See also ==
- Classic dinghy classes
- Olympic sailing classes
- List of sailing boat types
- List of other classes of keelboats and yachts
