= List of dinghy classes designed before 1960 =

The following is a list of dinghy classes designed before 1960.

== Classic one design dinghy and small keelboat classes ==
Year	Nationality	Name	Length	Designer	Builder	Origins	Active fleets	Notes
1886	GBR/IRL	Water Wag	13 ft 0 in (3.96 m)	Thomas B. Middleton of Shankill Corinthinan Sailing Club	Current builders, various in Ireland, France, Spain and USA. Note: 1900 change to 14ft3ins by James (or Maimie) Doyle from Kingstown	Water Wag Club, Kingstown	Royal Irish Yacht Club, Royal St. George Yacht Club, National Yacht Club, North Shannon Yacht Club	c.104 boats built to date, but newest number is 51. Active club in Dun Laoghaire with up to 31 boats racing every week of the summer season
1896	GBR/ IRL	Nipper (boat)	unknown, less than 12 ft	Cleg Foley of Ringsend	Cleg Foley of Ringsend	Sutton Golf Club and Boat Club, near Dublin	no active fleets	Sailed at Cush Point, now home of Sutton Golf Club. Boats allegedly required a lot of bailing. probably sailed single handed.
1896 (autumn)	GBR/IRL	Droleen	12 ft 0 in (3.66 m)	Mr. William Ogilvy of Dublin	First nine boats built by Foley of Ringsend. Other boats built by local amateur builders of Bray, Devon boat building school and Galway bost building school, Barna	Bray Sailing Club (founded 1896)	No active fleets	Two new boats built in Bray by amateurs in 2014.
1896	GBR/IRL	Colleen	L.O.A. 6.71m.	James E. Doyle of Kingstown	Various builders	Dublin Bay Sailing Club	3 boats Dublin Bay	At least three boats still sailing regularly at local regattas. (long keel plus centreboard)
1896	GBR/IRL	Cork Harbour One Design	29 ft 0 in (8.84 m)	William Fife	No current builders	Royal Cork Yacht Club	At least one boat active.	
1897	IRL	Howth 17 Footer	24 ft 6 in (7.47 m)	W. Herbert Boyd	Various builders	Howth Yacht Club	Howth Yacht Club	About 17 boats actively race weekly. This is a one-design keelboat, and not a dinghy.
1898	GBR	Seabird Half Rater	20 ft 0 in (6.10 m)	Mr. Herbert Baggs and Mr. W. Scott Hayward	Lathoms of Hesketh Bank, W.H Rowland & Co., Bangor, W. Roberts & Son, Chester, Hilditch, Carrickfergus, John Crossfield & Co., Conway, Enterprise Small Craft Co., Rock Ferry, A.M. Dickie & Son, Bangor, S. Bond, Rock Ferry, Western Marine, Pwllheli, Kenneth M. Gibbs Ltd., Pwllheli, Wallasey Yacht Club, New Brighton, Philip Winram & Sons, Liverpool, Classic Sailboats, Caernarfon	West Lancs Yacht Club	Wallasey Yacht Club, South Caernarvonshire Yacht Club, Treaddur Bay Sailing Club	101 boats built to date, 75 survive to this day. 1979 saw recognition by the Guinness Book of Records that the Seabird Half Rater is the oldest OD Class still racing in Britain Fitted with a Centreboard
1906	GBR	West Kirby Star	16 ft 9 in (5.11 m)	George Cockshott	1st 8: Latham of Crossens	West Lancs Yacht Club	West Kirby Sailing Club	Fitted with a Centreboard
1911	GBR	Thames Estuary One Design (TEOD)	18 ft 0 in (5.49 m)	F. C. Morgan-Giles		Alexandra YC Southend on Sea & Essex YC Leigh on Sea		Gunter rig
1911	GBR	Yarmouth One Design Class	20 ft 10.5 in (6.363 m)	Henry Longmore	Theo Smith, Yarmouth, and two by Woodnutts, St. Helens	Solent Yacht Club	Royal Solent Yacht Club, Yarmouth, Isle of Wight	Keelboat. 13 built. originally gaff rigged, adopted Bermudian rig in 1936
1912	GBR	International 12 foot dinghy	12 ft 0 in (3.66 m)	George Cockshott	Various builders in UK, NED, ITL, TUR, JPN.	West Kirby Sailing Club	Netherlands, France, Germany, Italy Turkey, Royal St George YC, IRL and Japan	first one-design racing dinghy to gain international recognition. Used as sailing equipment at 1920 and 1928 Olympic games, and Vintage Games 2018, Copenhagen, DEN.
1913	GBR	Hamble One Design	18 ft 0 in (5.49 m)	A R Luke	Luke & Co (Hamble)	Hamble River Sailing Club	Not Active	
1914	GBR	Lymington Scow	11 ft 3 in (3.43 m)					One of a number of local classes, the 'Solent Scows' (see also Bembridge Scow, etc.)
1919	GBR	18 foot dinghy	24 ft 6 in (7.47 m)	G.L. Watson & Co.				used in the 1920 Summer Olympics as a double handed Olympic class; 18 ft LWL (long keel plus centreboard)
1919	GBR	Essex One Design (EOD)	18 ft 0 in (5.49 m)	F. C. Morgan Giles	Cole and Wiggins, Leigh on Sea	Essex YC Leigh on Sea		Bermudan Rig
1920's	USA	Snowbird (sailboat)	15 ft 6 in (4.72 m)	plans from Rudder magazine (1921)	Tom Broadway, G.V. Johnson			The Snowbird was the Olympic Monotype Class for the 1932 Olympics. See Newport Harbor Nautical Museum, California
1920	IRL	Shannon-One-Design	18 ft 0 in (5.49 m)	F. C. Morgan-Giles	Walter Levinge of Creaghduff, Coosan, Kineavy, Ward, Jimmy Furey, Peter Quigley, Eric Goodbody, Liam Maloney, Edwin Brennan, Doughal McMahon, J Jones, Cathy MacAleavy	Lough Ree, Derg & North Shannon Yacht Clubs	Lough Ree Y.C. & Lough Derg Y.C.,	Designed as balanced lugger, now Gunter rig, designed for use on the river Shannon and her lakes www.soda.ie c.178 boats built, and over 30 boats compete at regattas annually.
1921	FRA	French National Monotype 1924	16 ft 0 in (4.88 m)	Gaston Grenier				used in 1924 Olympics
1921	GBR	Salcombe A Class	0 ft 0 in (0 m)	H. Hardy Simpson				Not Active
1923	GBR	St Mawes One Design	18 ft 0 in (5.49 m)	William Francis Peters	45		Active	Note: Ballasted Centreplate Dayboat
1923	NZL	P-class sailing dinghy	7 ft 7 in (2.31 m)	Harry Highet				Originally at Onerahi then Tauranga
1924	GBR	West Wight Scow/ Yarmouth Scow	11 ft 3 in (3.43 m)	Theo Smith				
1926	GBR	Hamble Star	14 ft 0 in (4.27 m)	A R Luke				Active
1927	GBR	Brightlingsea One Design	0 ft 0 in (0 m)	Robbie Stone	Stone Shipyard			Active
1931	GBR	Sea View One-Design	12 ft 0 in (3.66 m)	Major Gordon Fowler/Harry Feltham	V.A. Warren & Son	Sea View Yacht Club	Active at Sea View	over 200 built: largest local one-design fleet on the South Coast of England
1931	AUS	12 Square meter Sharpie (dinghy)	19 ft 8 in (5.99 m)	Kroger Brothers			Australia	UK, Netherlands, Germany, Portugal
1931	Worldwide	Snipe (dinghy)	15 ft 6 in (4.72 m)	William Crosby			Florida West Coast Racing Association	
1931	GBR	Norfolk Dinghy	14 ft 0 in (4.27 m)	Herbert Woods	Herbert Woods	Norwich Frostbite SC	NFSC, BASC, NBYC	
1932	USA	Comet (dinghy)	16 ft 0 in (4.88 m)	Mr. C. Lowndes Johnson		Chesapeake Bay		Originally called the "Crab," then the Star Junior before taking on the name Comet
1932	IRL	Dublin Bay Mermaid	17 ft 0 in (5.18 m)	John B. Kearney	Various	Dublin Bay Sailing Club	Skerries Sailing Club, Foynes Sailing Club, Dublin Bay Sailing Club, Wexford Tennis & Sailing Club	Each year the Mermaid sailors come together at a different venue for a week's racing.
1932	GBR	British Moth	11 ft 0 in (3.35 m)	Sydney Cheverton				Active
1934	USA	Hampton One Design	0 ft 0 in (0 m)	Vincent Serio		Hampton YC, Virginia		
1936	GBR	Wivenhoe One Design	15 ft 0 in (4.57 m)	Dr. Walter Radcliffe	Various	Wivenhoe Sailing Club	Wivenhoe One-Design Association	~19 built, ~16 extant
1937	GBR	Menai Strait One Design	20 ft 0 in (6.10 m)					17 built, all still extant. Active
1938	GBR	Firefly	12 ft 0 in (3.66 m)	Uffa Fox	Fairey Marine & Others			Used as single handler at 1948 Toequay Olympic Regatta. Active fleets throughout Uk and IRL.
1938/9	GBR	Ace (national 18)	18 ft 0 in (5.49 m)	Uffa Fox		Whitstable YC		
1940s	GBR	Fowey River Class	15 ft 0 in (4.57 m)	Reg Freeman				Active
1945	USA	Thistle	17 ft 1 in (5.21 m)	Sandy Douglass				
1945	IRL	Irish Dinghy Racing Association 14 footer	14 ft 0 in (4.27 m)	George O'Brien Kennedy	Various builders	by Irish Dinghy Racing association	Active fleets, Dublin Bay, Sutton, Clontarf.	
1947	UK	Aldeburgh Lapwing	12 ft 7 in (3.84 m)				Aldeburgh	Active
1949	Worldwide	GP14	14 ft 0 in (4.27 m)	Jack Holt				Active
1950	GBR	Yachting World Dayboat	14 ft 0 in (4.27 m)	G. O’Brien Kennedy				Active
1950	GBR	Bembridge Scow	11 ft 3 in (3.43 m)					One of the 'Solent Scow' classes. See also Lymington Scow (1914) and the (Yarmouth) West Wight Scow (1924) cf. Bembridge One Design
1951	GBR	Axe One Design	12 ft 3 in (3.73 m)	Jack Drew	Jack Drew	Axe Yacht Club, Axmouth	Axe Yacht Club	Some 20 built up to the 1960s; ~7 extant
1952	GBR	Hornet	16 ft 0 in (4.88 m)	Jack Holt				NB: Restricted Class
1956	GBR	Enterprise	13 ft 3 in (4.04 m)	Jack Holt				
1966	GBR	Estuary OD	18 ft 0 in (5.49 m)		Thames Structural Plastics and later E.R. Birch, both of Canvey Island			Based on Thames Estuary One Design and Essex One Design
			0 ft 0 in (0 m)					

== Classic development dinghy classes ==
Year	Nationality	Name	Length	Designer	Builder	Origins	Active fleets	Notes
1898	GBR	Thames A-class rater	0 ft 0 in (0 m)	Various	Various	River racing at the end of the 19thC	Thames Sailing Club	
1928	AUS	Inverloch Eleven Footer (Australian precursor to Moth Class	11 ft 0 in (3.35 m)	Various	Various	Len Morris at Inverloch		
1929	USA	American Moth Boat	11 ft 0 in (3.35 m)	Various	Various	Started by Captain Joel Van Sant	Elizabeth City, North Carolina	
1972	Worldwide	International Moth	11 ft 0 in (3.35 m)	Various	Various	Merged from AUS, USA, NZL and GBR classes	Widely distributed	
1996	Worldwide	International 14	14 ft 0 in (4.27 m)	Various	Various	Merged from UK class formed 1923 which became Int 14 in 1927 and AUS class formed late 19thC	Widely distributed	
1936	GBR	National 12	12 ft 0 in (3.66 m)	Various	Various	Created by the UK RYA as a cheaper alternative to the 14 ft Class	Widely distributed in GBR	
1951	GBR	Merlin Rocket	14 ft 0 in (4.27 m)	Various	Various	Merged from the Merlin (1949) and Rocket (1951) Classes	Widely distributed in GBR	
1951	NZL/AUS/GBR	Cherub Class	12 ft 0 in (3.66 m)	Various	Various	Founded by John Spencer in New Zealand from the Pennant Class.	Widely distributed in GBR and AUS	
late 19thC	Mainly AUS	18ft Skiff	18 ft 0 in (5.49 m)	Various	Various	19thC AUS	Mainly Sydney area Skiff clubs, a few worldwide.	
early 20thC	AUS/NZL	12ft Skiff	12 ft 0 in (3.66 m)	Various	Various	19thC AUS and NZL Q Class	Mainly Sydney & Auckland	
throughout 20thC	GBR	Norfolk Punt	22 ft 0 in (6.71 m)	Various	Various	developments notably from 1930s, 1953 (Wycche), 1960s (Trapeze), 1970s (Fibreglass), etc.	Active	

== See also ==
- Classic keelboat classes
- Dinghy racing
- Dinghy sailing
- Olympic sailing classes
