= Dublin Bay 21 =

Historic class of Irish yachts

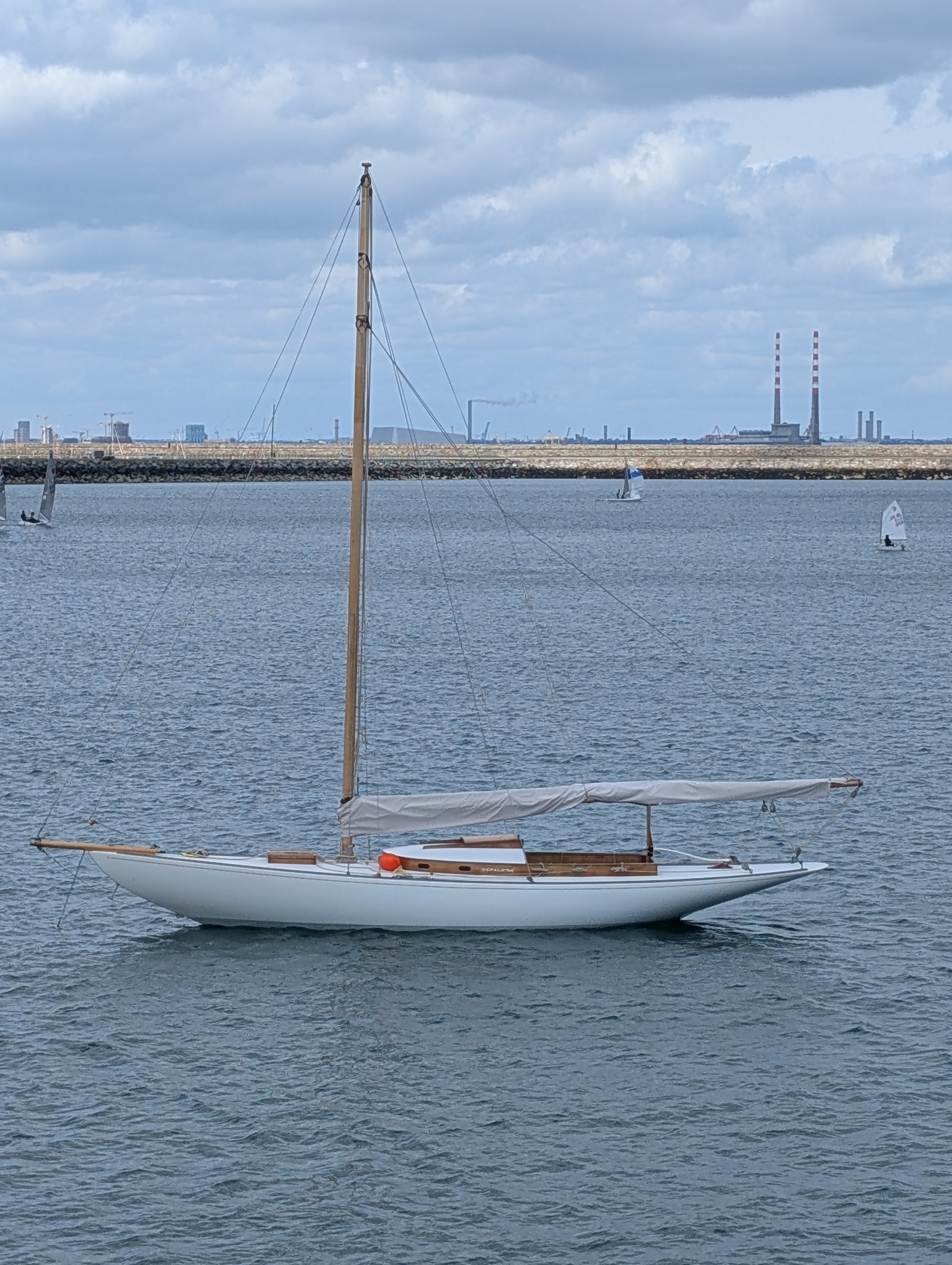
- Geraldine

Development
- Designer: Alfred Mylne
- Design: One-Design

Hull
- Type: Monohull
- LOA: 32'-6'
- Beam: 7'-6"

Hull appendages
- Keel: lead keel
- Ballast: 2,000 kg (4,400 lb)

Rig
- Rig type: Gaff rig

Sails
- Total sail area: 600 sq ft (56 m^{2})

The Dublin Bay 21 footer yacht is a one-design wooden sailing boat designed for sailing in Dublin Bay. The seven yachts were designed by Alfred Mylne and built between 1903 and 1906 under a commission from Dublin Bay Sailing Club to encourage inexpensive one-design racing in recognition of the success of the Water Wag one-design of 1887 and the Colleen Class of 1897. They may be the oldest class of racing keelboat yacht in the world.

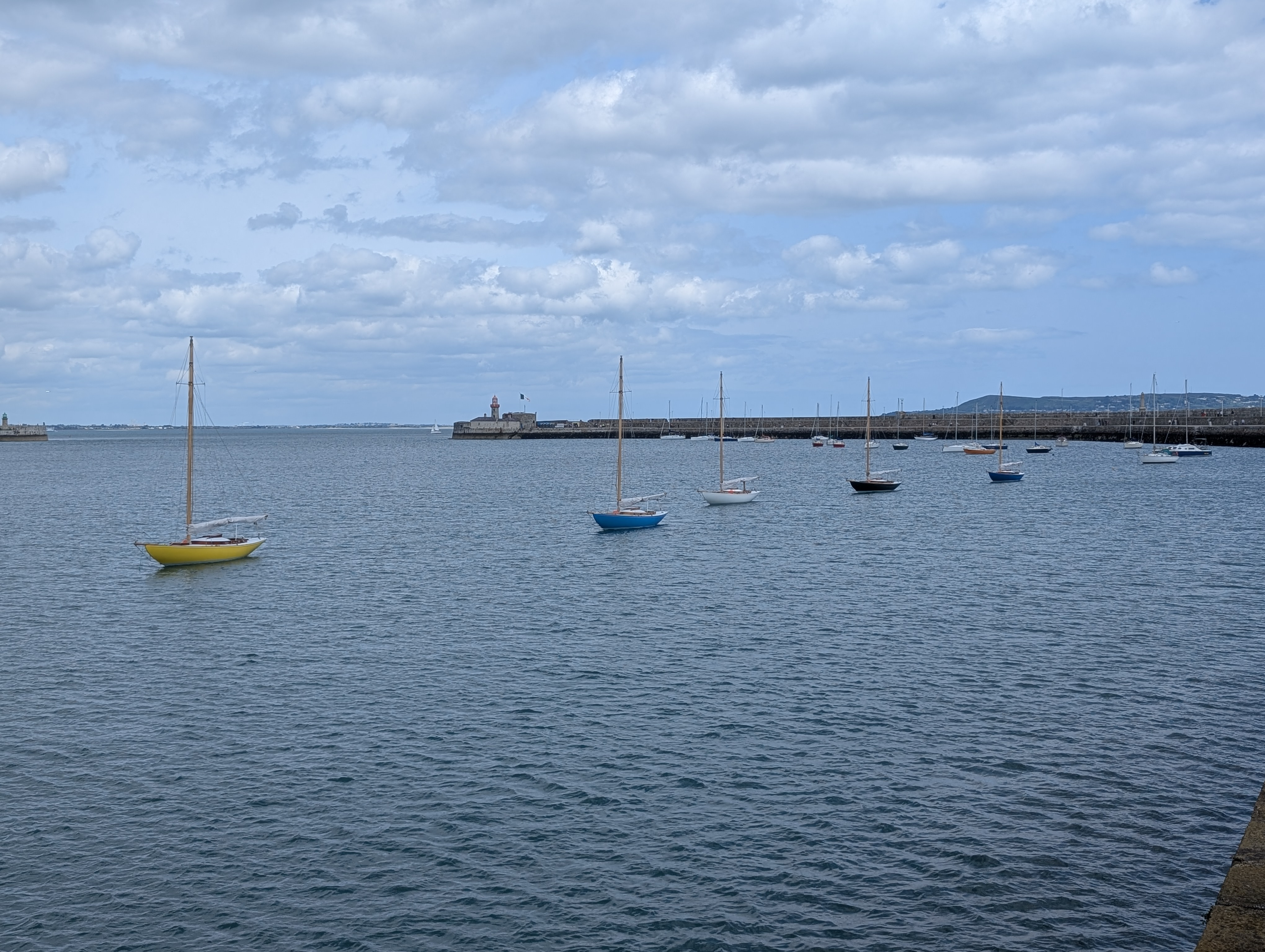
Dublin Bay 21s at anchor in Dún Laoghaire.

The first race took place on 19 June 1903 in Dublin Bay.

== List of boats ==
The seven sisters:

- Innisfallen built by Hollwey, 1903.
- Maureen built by Hollwey, 1903.
- Estelle built by Hollwey, 1903.
- Garavogue built by Kelly, 1903.
- Oola built by Kelly, 1905.
- Naneen built by Clancy, 1905.
- Geraldine built by Hollwey, 1908.

The class is now being rebuilt following a long period out of service when the fleet lay in various states of disrepair in Jack Tyrrell's boatyard in Arklow, County Wicklow. The fleet were taken out of the water in 1986 after Hurricane Charley ruined active Dublin Bay 21 fleet racing in August of that year. Two 21s sank in the storm, suffering the same fate as their sister ship Estelle four years earlier.

The Naneen, Garavogue, Estelle and Geraldine were the first boats to be back on the water. The Oola was re-launched on May 16, 2025. The frames are constructed for the Maureen and Inisfallen, who will hopefully be back on the water by 2025.

The sail plan of the rebuilt boats is a modification of the original cutter, designed by Milne in 1918, with topsails. It consists of a single jib and a higher gaff, with no topsail. While a spinnaker is facilitated, it has not been installed..

It is said that these boats present one of the loveliest sights to be seen on any sailing waters in the world.

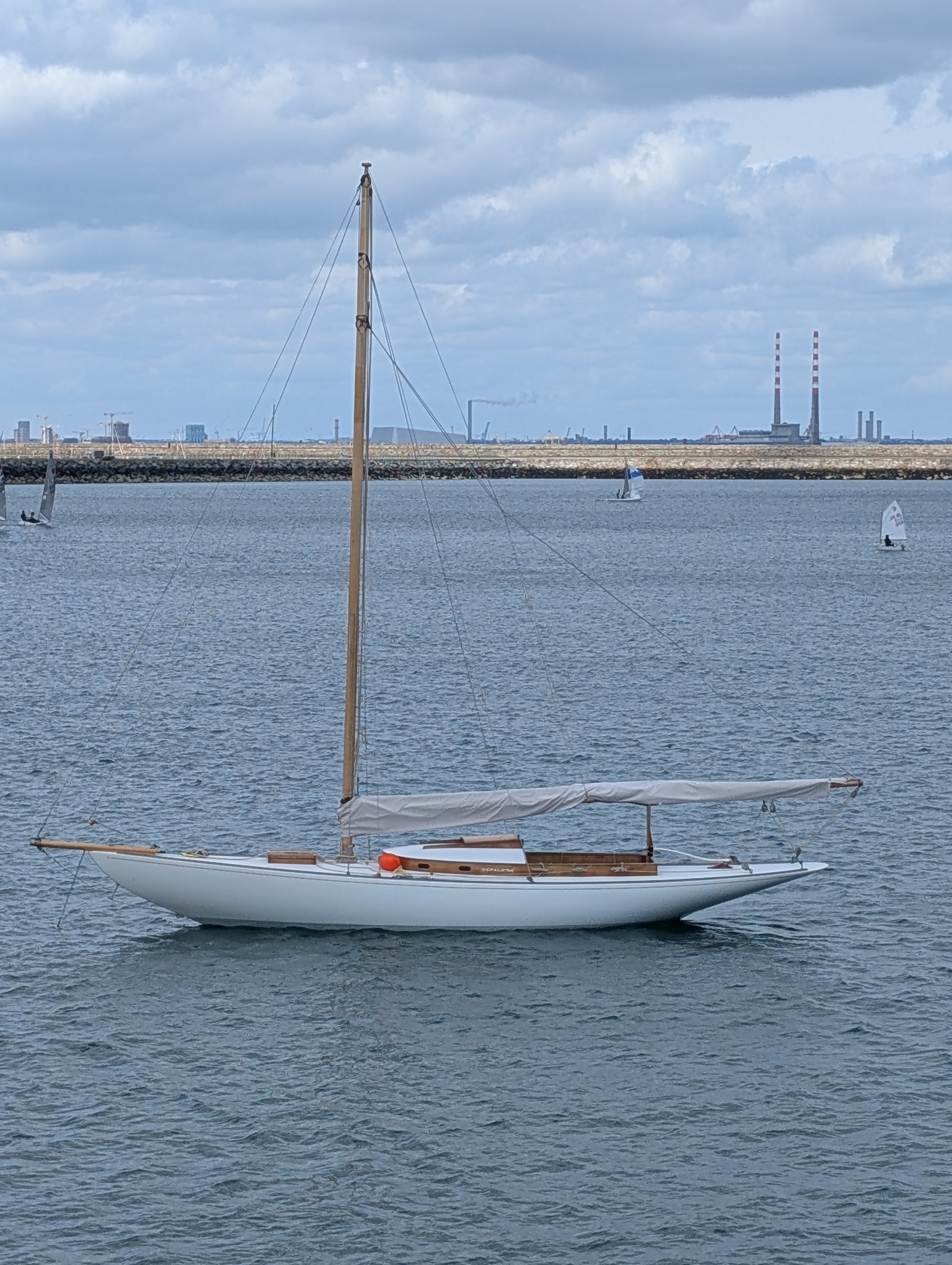
Geraldine, with the Poolbeg stacks behind her.

== Change of rig ==
In 1964, some of the owners thought that the boats were outdated, and needed a new breath of fresh air. After extensive discussions between all the owners, the gaff rig and timber mast was abandoned in favour of a more fashionable Bermudan rig with an aluminium mast. This rig put previously unforeseen loads on the hulls, resulting in some permanent damage.
