= WOD =

WOD may refer to:

- Warsash One Design, 27 ft sailing yacht designed by Fred Parker in the 1960s
- Wodonga railway station, in Victoria, Australia
- Wolani language
- Workout of the Day, an integral part of CrossFit
- World Oceans Day, celebrated 8 June
- World of Dance, an American media company
- World of Darkness, fictional settings for supernatural horror-themed role-playing games
- World of Warcraft: Warlords of Draenor, the fifth World of Warcraft expansion set
- William O. Douglas, American jurist
