= Bosham Sailing Club =

Building in Bosham, Chichester, West Sussex, UK

- Club Burgee (Bosham Bell)
- Formation: 1907
- Location: The Quay, Bosham, West Sussex, United Kingdom
- Coordinates: 50.8282°N 0.86°W
- Commodore: Richard Lewis
- Affiliations: Royal Yachting Association
- Website: www.boshamsailingclub.com

Bosham Sailing Club is the oldest sailing club in Chichester Harbour and was founded in 1907 It is located in the historic village of Bosham in West Sussex. Its clubhouse is the Old Mill on Bosham Quay.

== History ==
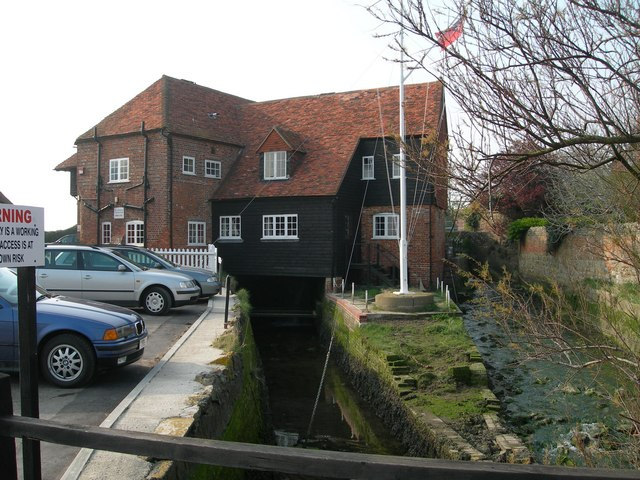
The Old Mill at Bosham, the club headquarters.

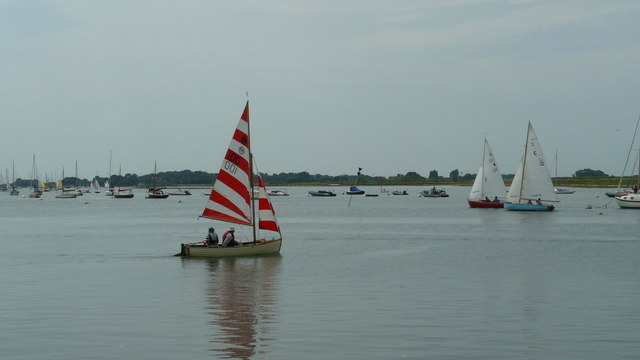
Yachts on Bosham Channel

The club was founded by Captain E.K. Collis-Chapman in a converted stable on the Bosham waterfront. Its first members consisted of mostly local fishermen and recreational sailors.

At the end of World War One the club was briefly named "Bosham and Itchenor Sailing Club". It reverted to its pre-war name in 1922 and Itchenor Sailing Club was formed in 1927.

In 1927 the club moved to the upper half of the Raptackle building on the Quay, from where it still continues to start many of its races. In 1947, the club purchased a Motor Gun Boat (MGB) (No. 614) to provide a clubhouse and sleeping accommodation. The club continued to use the MGB as its clubhouse until it moved into a newly rebuilt Mill House in 1954. In December 2019, the club purchased the freehold of the clubhouse.

The club's burgee is a red bell on a white background. This alludes to the legend of the "Bosham Bell" which tells of a Viking raiding party's attempt to sail off with the monastery's tenor bell, however the bell toppled over taking the Vikings and their ship to the bottom of the Bosham Channel. Local folklore has it that the bell can sometimes be heard tolling from beneath the waters.

The club has a long association with the Société des Régates du Havre yacht club (Est 1838).

In October 2016 the club had 1,442 members. The clubhouse has a bar, restaurant and changing facilities, and its terrace overlooks the Bosham Channel.

== Sailing ==
=== Club Racing ===
There is an active dinghy sailing programme which has events on every weekend from early March to the end of October and a Winter series leading up to Christmas. The club offer handicap racing on most Sundays which allows its members to race any class of dinghy. The main classes of dinghy sailed at the club are the Laser, Finn, Wayfarer. International 420, RS Feva, Topper, and Optimist. Open events are held for many of these classes throughout the year.

Depending on the state of the tide, racing starts from a starting platform at the end of Bosham Quay, a starting line at Cobnor near the entrance to the Bosham Channel, or from the club's Committee Boat ("Glad Emma") anchored in Chichester Harbour.

=== RYA Training ===
Bosham Sailing Club is recognised by the RYA as an accredited training centre and runs a range of dinghy, powerboat and sailing theory courses for members and non-members. It is also a test centre for the ICC.

=== Classic Day Boats ===
The club has an active racing and social program for its fleet of over 100 Classic Day Boats. These are yachts of a design that would have seemed familiar to spectators of Chichester Harbour races during the years up to the 1950s having no sheltered accommodation and having pivoting centreplates. They are more heavily built than a dinghy and are capable of being left on an open mooring. The club hosts its annual Classic Boat Revival for classic racing dinghies and dayboats each September which has been described by Yachts & Yachting magazine as the "premier classic small boat event in the UK"

=== Bosham Junior Week ===
Bosham Junior Week is an annual week-long sailing event in August each year for young sailors from 8–18 years of age (Cadets) held on the Cobnor Estate, near Chidham, West Sussex. Cadet racing has been taking place at the club since the 1920s and Junior Week emerged in its current form in the 1980s.

A trophy is awarded each year for racing on the windiest day of the week in memory of the Olympic sailor and club member, Glyn Charles, who died in the 1998 Sydney to Hobart Yacht Race.

In 2017 the event attracted 149 participants in 107 boats.

=== Annual Regatta ===
Regattas in Chichester Harbour began in the 19th Century as sailing competitions between each of the harbour village's fishing fleets and were organised by the local customs officers. The first recorded Bosham Regatta took place in 1903 and the Club's Commodore (then Col. A.T.Simpson) took on the organisation of the event from 1908 onwards. An annual regatta has taken place since then with the occasional break for World Wars and unsuitable weather. The oldest surviving trophy still being awarded at the regatta is the Eadie Cup which was first presented in 1923.

== Members ==
- The 2nd Earl of Iveagh (1874–1967)
- Charles Currey (1916–2010) – Olympic Silver Medallist (Finn 1952) (silver)
- Admiral Sir Anthony Griffin (1920–1996)
- Air Vice-Marshal John Downey (1920–2010)
- Admiral Sir John (Sandy) Woodward (1932–2013)
- Bowen Wells – Member of Parliament 1979–2001
- The 3rd Earl of Iveagh (1937–1992)
- John Nelson – Chairman of Lloyds
- The 4th Earl of Iveagh
- Sarah Ayton – Olympic Gold Medallist (Yngling 2004 and 2008) (gold) (gold)
