= Dublin Bay 24 =

Development
- Designer: Alfred Mylne
- Year: 1938
- Design: One-Design
- Name: Dublin Bay 24

Boat
- Crew: 4 – 5

Hull
- Type: Monohull
- Construction: Wood
- LOA: 11.5111 m (37.766 ft)
- LWL: 7.3 m (24 ft)
- Beam: 2.44 m (8 ft 0 in)

Hull appendages
- Keel: Fixed

Sails
- Mainsail area: 48.2 m^{2} (519 sq ft)

The Dublin Bay 24 footer yacht is a one-design wooden sailing boat designed for sailing in Dublin Bay.

It was designed in the mid-1930s, under a commission from a group of Dublin Bay owners, members of the Royal Alfred Yacht Club, yacht designer Alfred Mylne produced the largest one-design yacht in Europe. The classic lines prompted one owner to declare it a ”six-metre with a proper amount of beam” and the sea-keeping qualities, particularly downwind in heavy conditions were much admired. Although used now as dayboats, some of them have raced and cruised offshore in the past, including Fastnet Races, the Northwest coast of Norway & throughout Scotland.

Built at the Isle of Bute, their building was disturbed by the war so the first boat was not delivered until 1946. Eventually eight hulls were constructed and seven of them raced for many years in Dublin Bay.

List of Boats and their sail numbers:

1. Fenestra
2. Vandra (lost)
3. Euphanzel
4. Zephyra
5. Adastra
6. Harmony
7. Periwinkle
8. Arandora

The original five were Euphanzel, Fenestra, Vandra, Zephyra and Adastra. These were later joined by Harmony and Arandora. Periwinkle stayed in Scotland.

The class is now defunct, and none of the Dún Laoghaire berthed fleet remain. The last Dublin Bay Sailing Club Dublin Bay 24 Class race was held on 25 September 2004. The entire fleet are currently undergoing a refit in Benodet, Brittany, France. Once restored the fleet will be based at Villefranche-sur-Mer on the French Riviera.

There is at least one Dublin Bay 24 still afloat but she is in Sydney Australia. Wathara was built in Seaforth on Sydney Harbour by George Riddle and Sons and launched in 1948. Images of her are in the book Alfred Milne Yacht Designer 1872–1951.
