= Seabird Half Rater =

Sailing boat design

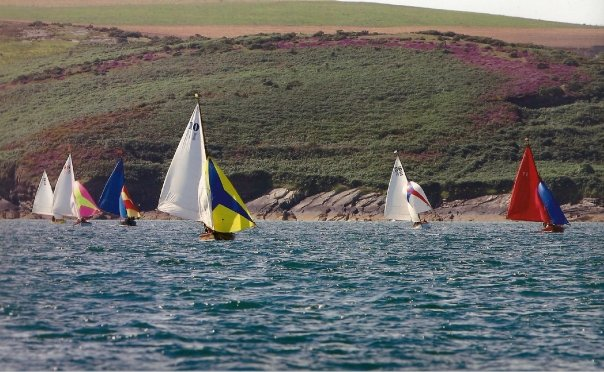
Seabird Half Raters in Abersoch

The Seabird Half Rater is the oldest one design class still sailing in Britain. It is a 20 ft carvel planked sailing boat, with a design dating back to 1898. As of the 2017 season there have been 101 built [up to No.108]. The class has a Portsmouth Yardstick of 1229.

== History ==
In the autumn of 1898 West Lancashire Yacht Club passed a resolution favouring the founding of a new One Design Class boat, not to cost more than £35 complete.

The class owes its inception and inspiration from the design by Mr. Herbert Baggs in collaboration with Mr. W. Scott Hayward who drew up the original plans on the back of a cigarette packet under a street lamp in Southport. The first eight boats were built by Latham of Crossens at a cost of £34 17s 6d each. The boats were named after Seabirds and under the Dixon Kemp rule their rating was calculated to be 0.5 hence the name “Half Rater”. The design is similar to that of a 0.75 rater but on a smaller scale and with one or two improvements, the most notable difference was the Seabird didn't have the overhanging 'counter' of the 0.75 rater.

The original 8 boats were balloted for once they were all complete, which was a good method of ensuring a strict compliance to the one design rules. Mr. Herbert Baggs and Mr. W. Scott Hayward dedication to the class was demonstrated by them being amongst the first owners of the new boats owning Seamew No. 7 and Fulmar No. 1 respectively.

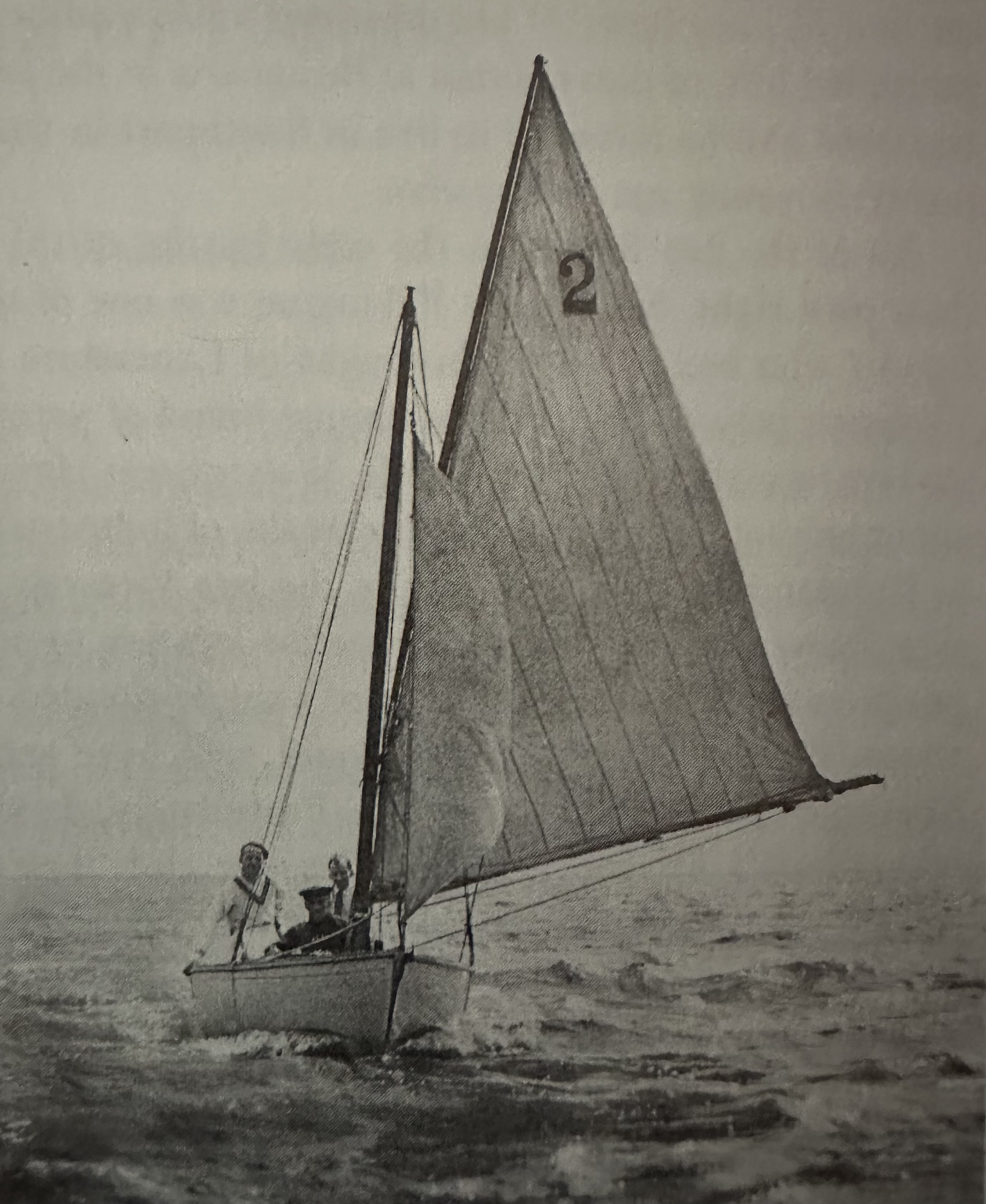
Seabird Half rater No.2 Goshawk pictured in 1898 helmed by Dudley Coddington

The first race was sailed off the Southport Pierhead on 13 June 1899 when eight boats participated over a ten-mile course and Goshawk No.2, helmed by owner Mr Dudley Coddington took the winning gun, ahead of Fulmar No.1 helmed by Mr. W. Scott Hayward. Goshawk went on to have the best record in both the 1899 and 1900 seasons.

The Class was adopted by the Donaghadee Sailing Club, on the east coast of Northern Ireland, in 1901 under the name of 'The Seashells' and by Gourock YC, on the Clyde, under the title of 'The Gaels' in 1905. In 1902 Caernarvon SC adopted the Class and the boats were known as 'Cariads'. As a result of these naming conventions many of the older boats have been renamed multiple times when they've moved clubs and this is why despite the class now solely being known as “Seabirds” some boats still have “odd” names that aren't named after birds, such as Chila No.18, Valmai No.25 and Gael No.38.

Inter club racing was first held on the waters of Belfast Lough during the summer of 1902 when a fleet of 17 Seabirds competed over a weeks worth of racing which gained considerable praise from the yachting press as one of the first international sailing events. Further inter club racing was held in the Menai Strait in August 1903 and returned to Belfast Lough during the summer of 1904. There was great enthusiasm at this time and the 1902 August edition of The Yachtsman reporting on the Menai Strait Regattas states "none of the Threequarter Raters which generally give good sport at the Regattas were able to sail down but the Seabirds managed to arrive by rail in time for the first day at Caernarvon".

By the time the Seabirds, Seashells and Cariads O.D. Association was formed in the autumn of 1905 to keep the One Design concept intact, 26 boats had been built by 3 different boat builders, so it was decided that a class should be formed, to prevent any deviation from the original design. Following the formation of association to govern the construction and racing of the class, 6 new boats were built for the members of the Gourock Yacht Club who adopted the class in 1905 and the Liverpool Bay Y.C., followed with an order for 6 more boats to be built in 1906. In 1908 R. Perry & Son, Birkenhead were appointed sail makers, their price being £3 19s 6d for a full suit.

West Kirby Sailing Club were invited to sail Seabirds at Southport and Belfast Lough in 1905 and that sparked an interest in the class at the club which resulted in the first 2 Seabirds, Curlew No.30 and Goeland No.31 arriving at West Kirby in 1907 and 1909 respectively. They were followed in 1910 by the entire Donaghdee SC Seabird fleet of 9 boats who were bought by West Kirby Sailing Club to be sold onto members on a "first come, first served" basis, to form the nucleus of a fleet. They continued to be raced on the Dee until the 1950s. Despite having an impressive fleet of 24 boats at Southport when sailing resumed after the First World War, by the late 1930s they had all departed due to silting of their racing area. Sailing did briefly resume on the tide at Southport in the early 1960s however the loss of Whaup No.39 and yet more silting killed off the revival.

An unfortunate incident occurred during the 1907 Menai Straits regattas, a tug had been hired to tow the fleet of 8 Seabirds from Llandudno to Beaumaris in preparation for the following day's regatta in Penmaenmawr, however due to a misunderstanding they were delivered to Carvarvon instead! Due to the light winds none of the fleet were able to make it from Carnarvon to Penmaenmawr in time for the racing, only Dovekie No.8, winner of the previous days race in Llandudno made it to Penmaenmawr, albeit too late to compete in the race.

In 1910 it was agreed that the Association Burgee be a "White Seagull" on a red background. Prior to the First World War, 41 boats had been built and were racing regularly and the cost of a new boat had risen to £60.

Seabird Association Burgee

The association was strict in its principles and at a meeting at the West Kirby clubhouse in October 1912 decided not to admit one Seabird built by Roberts of Chester. The entry was refused on the grounds that he had been given authority to build five boats, not six. The rules were so strictly adhered to that this Seabird, Seasnipe number 33, was not recognised by the association until 1963.

The Class was adopted by The Magazines Sailing Club, in 1913, which later changed its name to Wallasey Yacht Club in 1921.

The first Half Rater appeared in Trearddur Bay in 1921, her name was Auk and she presented a problem because, although she conformed to the design, she had broken the Seabird Association rules by being built singly for one specific owner, rather than part of a batch which would then have been balloted for, having red sails which were not permitted at the time and also using the sail No.1 despite that already being allocated to an existing boat, then known as Seasnipe. However, when they found that she was no better than the others the Association accepted her as legitimate and reallocated her the sail No.53. A year later in 1922 Trearddur Bay Sailing Club officially adopted the Class.

In 1924 the newly formed South Caernarvonshire YC offered races in June for Seabirds. The first race at SCYC was held on the 9th of June between 5 boats of the Seabird class (four of them new, including Guillemot No.60). By the onset of world war 2 in 1938, 81 Seabirds had been constructed with 17 sailing at Abersoch, 12 on the Mersey, 8 at Trearddur Bay, 7 at West Kirby, 5 at Southport where racing on the bog hole had resumed, 4 in the Menai Straits, 2 at Lytham and single boats at Holyhead, Windermere, Torquay and Potter Heigham. Osprey, number 41, was in the Isle of Man but she had been modified out of class by having a metal keel added, although there were plans to purchase her and restore her to seabird association specifications.

The 60's saw a revival in the building programme of ten new boats, by this time the price of a seabird had risen to around £800. A news article at the time claimed there was a buyers market for "at least one new seabird per year". In 1965 there were 56 seabirds sailing regularly, mainly at Trearddur Bay (24 boats), Abersoch (21 boats), 7 boats on the Mersey sailing at Wallasey Yacht Club and West Cheshire Sailing Club and single boats at Holyhead, Rhyl and Conway, although Cormorant, number 9, was being used as a fishing boat out of Liverpool docks. The Association became affiliated to the RYA.

1972 saw recognition by the Guinness Book of Records that the Seabird Half Rater is the oldest OD Class still racing in Britain, and the Liverpool Maritime Museum hold the Association documents on loan.

Hurricane Charley in 1986 resulted in 10 of the fleet at Abersoch being sunk and badly damaged but they were all salvaged and the repairs were carried out by AMP Marine of Birkenhead.

The present day fleet is based in North Wales at Trearddur Bay and Abersoch and on the Mersey at Wallasey.

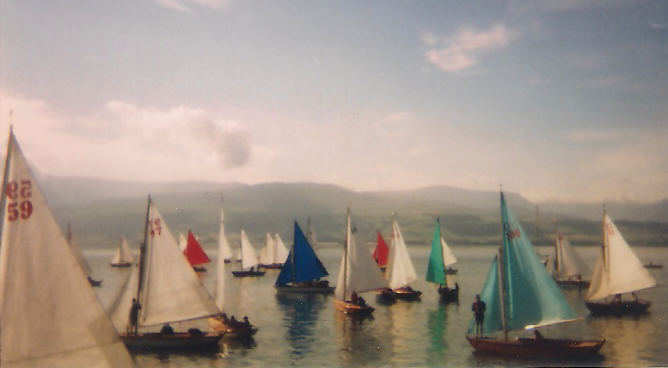
Seabird Half Raters at the start of a race at Beaumaris during the centenary regatta

The class celebrated its centenary year in 1999 and the highlight was when the three Stations raced together in the Menai Strait Regattas, when 47 Seabirds out of a total fleet of 67 met. Many of the older boats had been lovingly restored over the years and the regattas saw Goshawk No.2, Scoter No.6 and Dovekie No.8 who sailed in the very first race in 1899, still racing 100 years later against the newest seabird, at the time, Oystercatcher No.100 which was built in 1998.

Despite now costing in excess of £40,000 for a new boat, 8 new boats have been built between 2005–17, bringing the current total fleet up to 75, the majority are based at Treaddur Bay (34 Boats), Wallasey (23 Boats), Abersoch (11 Boats), Wirral (2 Boats) and Anglesey (2 Boats).

Between 2015-24 Seabird half raters have appeared on TV on numerous occasions including:

- Sea Cities: Maritime Merseyside featured Wallasey Yacht Club Seabirds racing in the club regatta on the Mersey, won by Eider No.77 and interviews about the rebuild of one of the boats, Osprey No.41.
- Britain Afloat episode: ‘The Sailing Boat’ featured a segment on the Wallasey Yacht Club Seabirds which included drone footage of the 2017 West Cheshire SC regatta and presenter Mary-Ann Ochota sailing on Terek No.94 on the Mersey.
- Safe House (TV series) The opening scene was filmed on board TBSC's Rockhopper No.105 sailing in Trearddur Bay.
- Tin Star (TV series): Liverpool which was filmed in Merseyside shows Wallasey Yacht Club's Eider No.77 on the Mersey.
- Great Coastal Railway Journeys Michael Portillo sailed onboard SCYC's Penguin No.40 in Abersoch, broadcast April 2024.

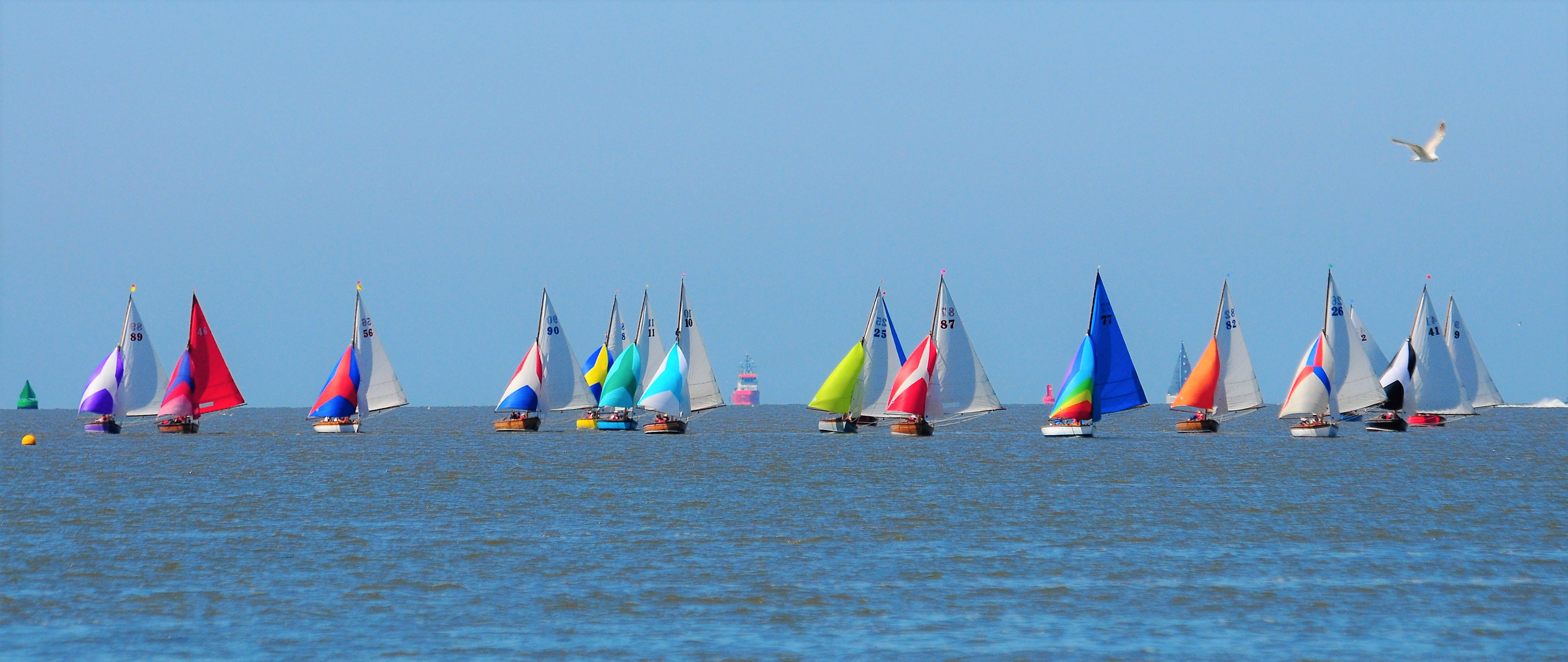
Seabird Half Raters in WYC Regatta 2018

== Dimensions ==
Seabird Half Rater Sail Plan

- Length overall: 20 ft.
- Length on load water line: 16 ft. 4in.
- Beam at deck: 6 ft.
- Beam at load water line: 5 ft. 6in.
- Draft: 1 ft. 3in.
- Sail area: 182.2sq. ft.

== Racing regulations ==
- The safety of every seabird is the responsibility of the owner and/or helm.
- Each Seabird must hold a valid racing certificate issued by the association.
- Each Seabird must have valid insurance covering the boat and crew against liability in respect of third party claims for at least half a million pounds whilst racing.
- Every Seabird must carry at least 2 crew and personal buoyancy must be worn at all times.
- Each Seabird must carry:
  - An anchor weighing no less than 9.1 kg.
  - 17 to 20 fathoms of quarter inch small link chain.
  - One pair of oars and rowlocks or a sculling oar and rowlock.
  - Distress flares.
- No Seabird may take part in a race for boats of the Seabird class unless it has been weighed and the weight is not less than the minimum regulation weight, 650 kg for the hull (centre plate, rudder, floorboards (and deck seats/buoyancy where fitted)) and 245 kg of ballast after the boat has been in commission for 28 days. If a Seabird is under this weight then additional ballast shall be added in positions designated by the committee.

== Sails ==
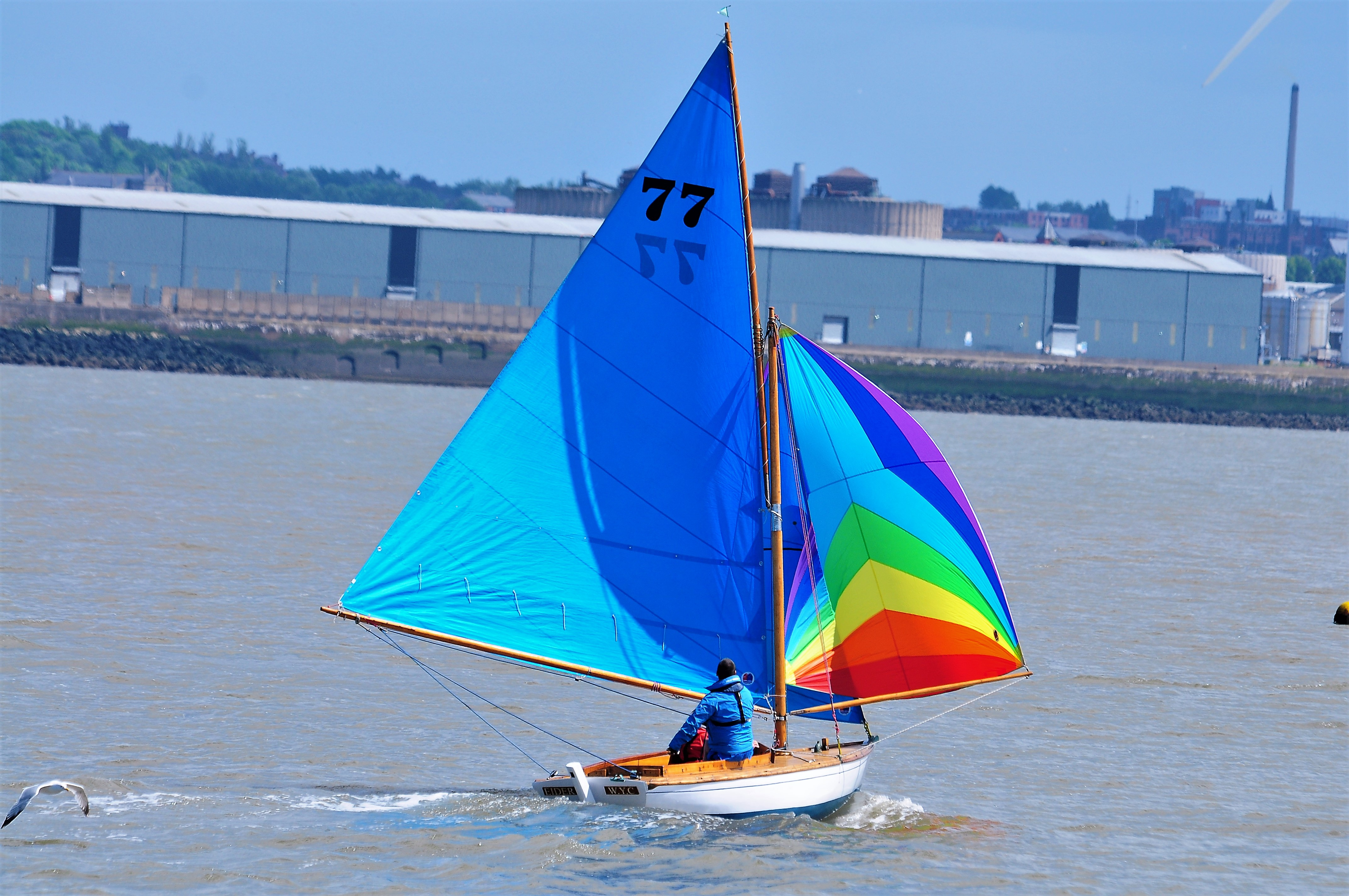
Seabird Half Rater Eider No.77

Racing under strict one design rules Seabird Half Rater sails are only supplied by only 2 sailmakers, Sanders Sails and North Sails. Sails must be measured by the official class measurer and stamped before use in races. No more than 3 sails, a mainsail, jib and spinnaker may be flown at any one time while racing. Sails may be coloured, but the most common colour is white, and they must display the number designated to the boat by the seabird association.

In 1889 a full suit [ mainsail, jib and spinnaker] of sails cost £3 19s 6d, this had risen to £52 by 1965 and currently costs in the region of £1,250.

Sail battens and Headboards are not allowed. However the class is trialing the use of windows in existing sails.

The spinnaker boom may not be passed to leeward of the forestay and its length must not exceed 8 ft overall.

== Equipment not sanctioned ==
- Bottle screws.
- Kicking straps.
- Winches.
- Joined tillers.
- Sliding fairleads.
- barber haulers.
- Topping lifts, downhauls and sliding mast tracks for spinnaker boom attachments.
- The covering of the keel centre board slot with strips of any material.
- Toe straps

== Modifications sanctioned ==
- Jamming cleats and blocks.
- All wire main halyards or Spectra rope.
- Buoyancy (as long as no structural alterations are made to the hull.)
- The main sheet may not have more than a three part purchase and no block on the boom may be positioned beyond 7 ft 0" forwards of the lacing hole.
- Replaceable plastic gudgeon bearings.
- The use of epoxy glue and fillers on all repair work.

== Current fleet ==
Number	Name	Previous Name(s)	Year built	Boat Builder	Current Status
1	Seasnipe	Fulmar	1898/99	R. Latham & Co., Crossens	Lost off Southport 1937
2	Goshawk		1898/99	R. Latham & Co., Crossens	SCYC
4	Kittiwake		1898/99	R. Latham & Co., Crossens	Lost off Southport 1936
5	Seagull		1898/99	R. Latham & Co., Crossens	Lost at Abersoch 1946
6	Scoter	Sandpiper, Triton, Auk, Gwen	1898/99	R. Latham & Co., Crossens	TBSC
7	Seamew		1898/99	R. Latham & Co., Crossens	Buenos Aires prior to 1914
8	Dovekie		1898/99	R. Latham & Co., Crossens	WYC
9	Cormorant	Perle, Mytilus	1898/99	R. Latham & Co., Crossens	WYC
10	Sandpiper	Leda, Laevis	1898/99	R. Lathom & Co., Crossens	WYC
11	Teal	Cowrie	1899	R. Latham & Co., Crossens	WYC
12	Merlin	Astarte, Buckie	1899	R. Latham & Co., Crossens	Lost at Trearddur Bay 1989
14	Petrel	Mya	1899	R. Latham & Co., Crossens	Lost in Mersey 1967
15	Fansy	Cyprina	1899	P Wright, Crossens	South Africa prior to 1914
16	Dodo		1900	P Wright, Crossens	Lost in Mersey after 1905
17	Mallard	Menna	1902	W.H Rowland & Co., Bangor	TBSC
18	Chila	Buddug	1902	W.H Rowland & Co., Bangor	TBSC
19	Fansy	Dilys	1902	W.H Rowland & Co., Bangor	Lost at Conway 1945
20	Puffin	Mair, Cyprina	1902	W.H Rowland & Co., Bangor	WYC
21	Dotterel	Gwen, Livorno	1902	W.H Rowland & Co., Bangor	Lost at Abersoch 1970
22	Seahawk	Modryb, Modryle	1902	W.H Rowland & Co., Bangor	Lost in Mersey before 1925
24	Skua		1902	W.H Rowland & Co., Bangor	WYC
25	Valmai	Fansy	1902/03	W.H Rowland & Co., Bangor	WYC
26	Fulmar	Jennie, Junonia, Jenny	1902/03	W.H Rowland & Co., Bangor	WYC
27	Gannet	Caia	1905	W. Roberts & Son, Chester	Lost in Mersey 1910
28	Albatross		1905	W. Roberts & Son, Chester	Lost at West Kirby 1953
29	Tern	Liver	1905	W. Roberts & Son, Chester	WYC
30	Curlew		1905	W. Roberts & Son, Chester	Lost off Hoylake 1926
31	Goeland		1905	W. Roberts & Son, Chester	Lost in Merseyside 1926
32	Whimbrel	Bluebell	1906	Hilditch, Carrickfergus	WYC
33	Seasnipe		1905	W. Roberts & Son, Chester	SCYC
34	Gannet	Shanga	1906	Hilditch, Carrickfergus	Lost off Hoylake after 1907
35	Royal Tern	Ashton, Aquila, Lapwing	1906	Hilditch, Carrickfergus	SCYC
36	Grebe	Maid Marion, Ena, Nina	1906	Hilditch, Carrickfergus	U.S.A. prior to 1955
37	Sealark	Mist	1906	Hilditch, Carrickfergus	Lost in Mersey 1923
38	Gael		1906	Hilditch, Carrickfergus	WYC
39	Whaup		1910	W.H Rowland & Co., Bangor	Lost off Southport 1963
40	Penguin	Triton	1910	W.H Rowland & Co., Bangor	SCYC
41	Osprey	Tess	1910	W.H Rowland & Co., Bangor	WYC
42	Bobolink		1920	John Crossfield & Co., Conway	WYC
44	Fleetwing		1920	John Crossfield & Co., Conway	Lost in Mersey 1957
45	Stormy Petrel		1920	John Crossfield & Co., Conway	Burnt at Lytham 1956
46	Dodo		1920	John Crossfield & Co., Conway	WYC
47	Mollyhawk		1920	John Crossfield & Co., Conway	Lost in Mersey 1937
48	Dunlin		1920	John Crossfield & Co., Conway	Lost in Trearddur Bay 1950
49	Sealark	Albatross	1920	John Crossfield & Co., Conway	TBSC
50	Seamew		1920	John Crossfield & Co., Conway	TBSC
51	Dot		1922	Rowlands Dockyards Ltd., Bangor	TBSC
52	Pintail	Razorbill, Betty	1922	Rowlands Dockyards Ltd., Bangor	SCYC
53	Auk		1920	John Crossfield & Co., Conway	TBSC
54	Gannet		1922	Rowlands Dockyards Ltd., Bangor	Lost in Trearddur Bay 1923
55	Shearwater		1922	Rowlands Dockyards Ltd., Bangor	TBSC
56	Kittiwake		1922	Rowlands Dockyards Ltd., Bangor	WYC
57	Tern		1922	Rowlands Dockyards Ltd., Bangor	TBSC
58	Sea Swallow		1924	Enterprise Small Craft Co., Rock Ferry	TBSC
59	Gull		1924	Enterprise Small Craft Co., Rock Ferry	TBSC
60	Guillemot		1924	Enterprise Small Craft Co., Rock Ferry	WYC
61	Pipit		1924	Enterprise Small Craft Co., Rock Ferry	WYC
62	Merganser		1924	Enterprise Small Craft Co., Rock Ferry	SCYC
64	Heron		1924	Enterprise Small Craft Co., Rock Ferry	Lost in Trearddur Bay 1947
65	Golden Eye		1924	Enterprise Small Craft Co., Rock Ferry	SCYC
66	Smew		1924	Enterprise Small Craft Co., Rock Ferry	Lost on the River Dart 1956
67	Scaup	Ombrette	1924	Enterprise Small Craft Co., Rock Ferry	TBSC
68	Gannet		1924	Enterprise Small Craft Co., Rock Ferry	TBSC
69	Eider		1924	Enterprise Small Craft Co., Rock Ferry	Lost in Mersey after 1926
70	Dipper		1926	A.M. Dickie & Son, Bangor	TBSC
71	Ruddy Duck		1926	A.M. Dickie & Son, Bangor	SCYC
72	Sula		1926	A.M. Dickie & Son, Bangor	TBSC
74	Avocet		1922	Rowlands Dockyards Ltd., Bangor	TBSC
75	Curlew		1931	A.M. Dickie & Son, Bangor	TBSC
76	Tringa		1935/36	A.M. Dickie & Son, Bangor	TBSC
77	Eider		1935/36	A.M. Dickie & Son, Bangor	WYC
78	Cygnet		1935/36	A.M. Dickie & Son, Bangor	TBSC
79	Dunlin		1935/36	A.M. Dickie & Son, Bangor	TBSC
80	Gwylan		1939	A.M. Dickie & Son, Bangor	TBSC
81	Egret		1939	A.M. Dickie & Son, Bangor	TBSC
82	Widgeon		1953	S. Bond, Rock Ferry	WYC
84	Sanderling		1953	S. Bond, Rock Ferry	Lost in Trearddur Bay 1983
85	Halcyon		1953	S. Bond, Rock Ferry	TBSC
86	Solan Goose		1953	Western Marine, Pwllheli	SCYC
87	Calloo		1953	Western Marine, Pwllheli	WYC
88	Goosander		1961	Kenneth M. Gibbs Ltd., Pwllheli	WYC
89	Kayoshk		1961	Kenneth M. Gibbs Ltd., Pwllheli	WYC
90	Pochard		1967	WYC, New Brighton	WYC
91	Marila		1967	Philip Winram & Sons, Liverpool	SCYC
92	Snowgoose		1968	Philip Winram & Sons, Liverpool	TBSC
93	Redshank		1968	Philip Winram & Sons, Liverpool	TBSC
94	Terek		1968	Philip Winram & Sons, Liverpool	WYC
95	Turnstone		1968	Philip Winram & Sons, Liverpool	Scrapped 2020
96	Shellduck		1968	Philip Winram & Sons, Liverpool	TBSC
97	Herring Gull		1969	Philip Winram & Sons, Liverpool	TBSC
98	Merlin		1994	J. Jones, Trearddur Bay	TBSC
99	Razorbill		1998	A.C.F. Morris, West Mersea	TBSC
100	Oystercatcher		1998	Classic Sailboats, Caernarfon	TBSC
101	Sanderling		2005	Classic Sailboats, Caernarfon	TBSC
102	Chough		2005	Classic Sailboats, Caernarfon	TBSC
103	Arctic Tern		2006	Classic Sailboats, Caernarfon	TBSC
104	Petrel		2008	Classic Sailboats, Caernarfon	TBSC
105	Rockhopper		2008	Classic Sailboats, Caernarfon	TBSC
106	Harlequin		2010	Classic Sailboats, Caernarfon	TBSC
107	Surfbird		2014/15	Boat Building Academy, Lyme Regis	TBSC
108	Booby		2014/17	D Price, WYC	WYC
