= Neptunkryssare =

Swedish sailboat type

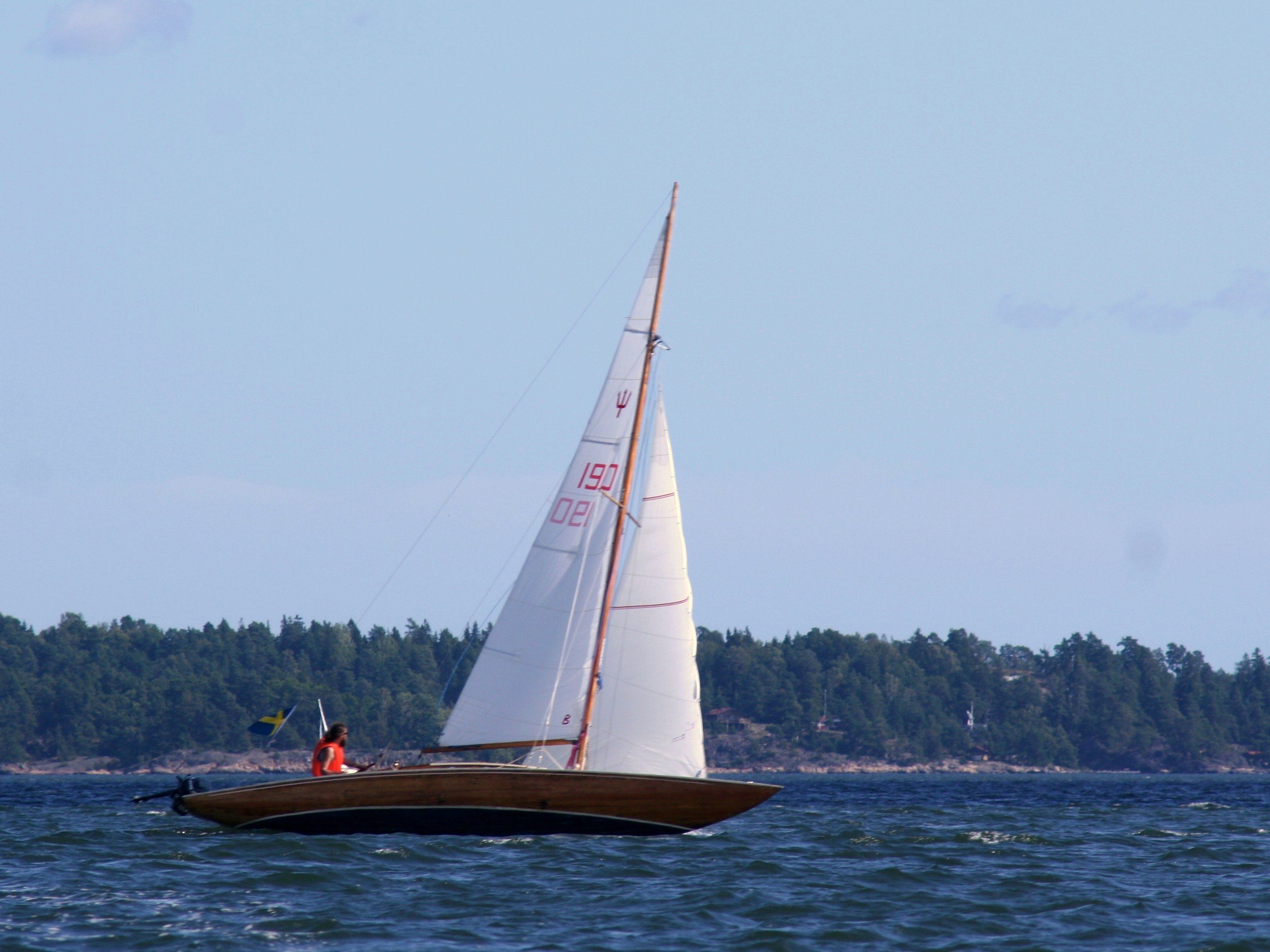
- Neptunkryssare in 2009.

Development
- Designer: Lage Eklund
- Year: 1938
- No. built: 275

Boat
- Displacement: 1,150 kg (2,540 lb)
- Draft: 1.20 m (3.9 ft)

Hull
- LOA: 9 m (30 ft)
- LWL: 5.85 m (19.2 ft)
- Beam: 1.92 m (6.3 ft)

Hull appendages
- Keel: fixed keel
- Ballast: 540 kg (1,190 lb)

Rig
- Rig type: Fractional rig
- Mast height: 8.95 m (29.4 ft)

Sails
- Mainsail area: 12 m^{2} (130 sq ft)
- Jib/genoa area: jib: 7 m^{2} (75 sq ft) genoa: 11.5 m^{2} (124 sq ft)
- Spinnaker area: 30 m^{2} (320 sq ft)
- Upwind sail area: 19 m^{2} (200 sq ft)

Neptunkryssare is a 9-metre (30 ft) sailboat class designed by Lage Eklund and built in about 275 copies.

== History ==
The Neptunkryssare was designed in 1938 for artist Einar Palme and become popular in Swedish cities Gävle and Uppsala. In 1944, it gained Swedish Championship status.
