= West Cheshire Sailing Club =

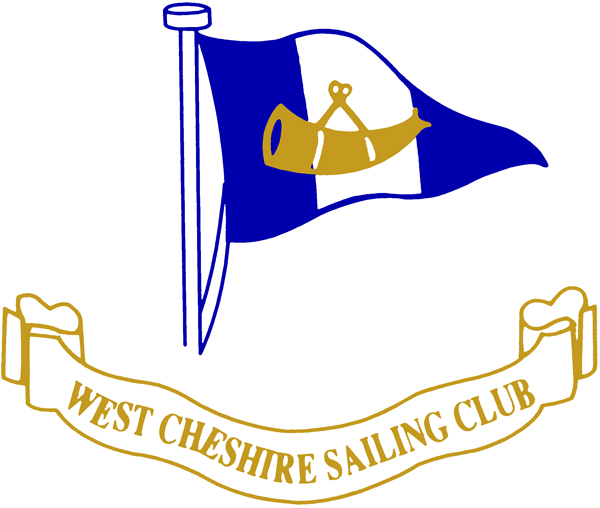
Burgee

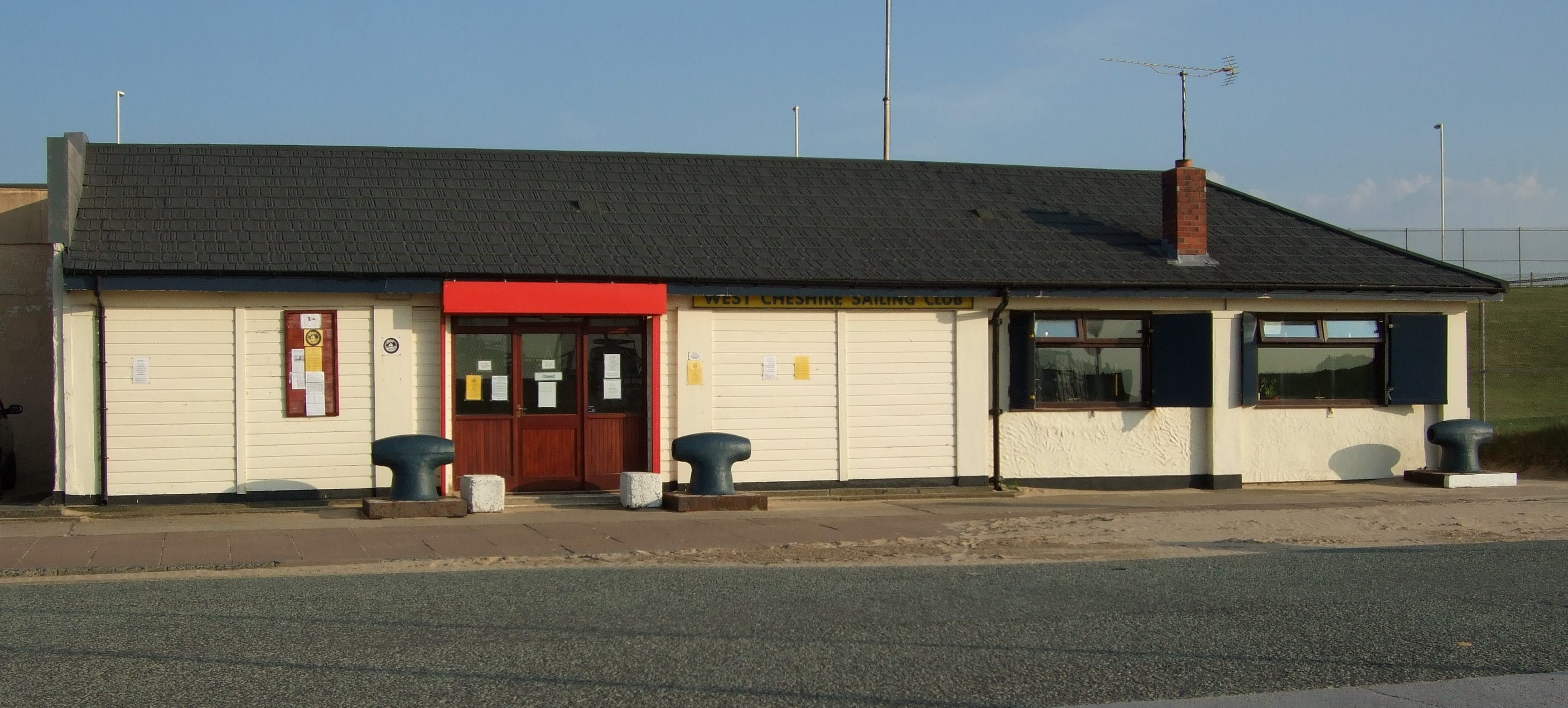
The Clubhouse

West Cheshire Sailing Club is located at Coastal Drive, off Harrison Drive, Wallasey, on the Wirral Peninsula, England, near Liverpool. The club was founded in 1892 and the members regularly sail on the River Mersey and New Brighton Marine Lake. The club mainly sails dinghies and has a thriving cadet section. The club hosts its annual regatta as part of the Wirral Regattas series where local sailors come to compete on the River Mersey.

== History ==
West Cheshire Sailing Club was founded at New Brighton in 1892 by members of the now defunct Magazine Sailing Club and New Brighton Sailing Club.

The headquarters of the club was located in a building on the New Brighton Pier. Boats were stored on shore at the pier, or on moorings in the Mersey. The club moved to its present location when the pier was demolished in 1961.

The brass cannon, now kept in the club, was a signal gun from a large steam yacht, White Eagle. She was built in Portsmouth, but spent most of her life in the Irish Sea on the Clyde. From time to time, club members would fire this gun at special events.

The first Club Dinner held by WCSC was held with the Victoria Rowing Club at the Hotel Victoria, New Brighton, before World War I.

A famous member of the club was Sir Ernest Marples MP, the man who planned the motorways and built the M1, as well as serving a stint as Postmaster General. He was for many years a member of the committee and Vice President from 1948 to 1958.

Lieutenant Commander Ian Fraser RN VC, was also a member of the club committee and captain of the club for three years. He served in submarines during World War II and was awarded the Victoria Cross for his part in the attack on Japanese warships in Singapore Harbour in 1945.

West Cheshire Sailing Club in collaboration with Northern Kites have formed Wallasey Beach CIC who will now manage the club house to provide a community space.
