= John Nelson (businessman) =

British businessman (born 1947)

John Frederick Nelson
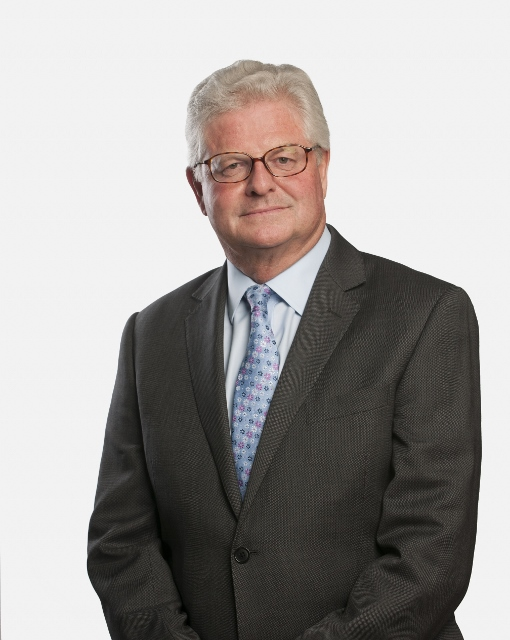
- John Frederick Nelson in 2014
- Born: 1947 (age 78–79)
- Occupation: Businessman

John Frederick Nelson CBE DL (born 26 July 1947) was formerly the Chairman of Lloyd's of London.

== Career ==
Having qualified as a Chartered Accountant in 1970, Nelson joined Kleinwort Benson in 1971, spending 15 years at the company working in both the UK and the US. He was Vice President of Kleinwort Benson Inc from 1973 to 1975, and became a Director of Kleinwort Benson itself in 1980, moving to Lazard Brothers in 1986. He then spent 13 years with Lazard Brothers as Managing Director between 1986 and 1998 and as Vice Chairman from 1990 to 1998. Nelson was also a chairman of Lazard S.p.A. in Italy and a Managing Director of Lazard Freres, New York. He became a Chairman of Credit Suisse First Boston Europe in 1999, retiring in 2002.

He was Deputy Chairman of Kingfisher plc. from 2002-2011. He was a non-executive director of BT Group from 2002-2008. He was also a non-executive director J.P. Morgan Cazenove Holdings and the Cazenove Group between 2008 and 2010.

Nelson joined Hammerson plc in 2004 and became its Chairman in 2005, retiring in 2013.

Nelson was appointed Chairman of Lloyd's of London in 2011, retiring in 2017.

His other appointments have included being Chairman of the London Investment Banking Association (LIBA) between 2001 and 2002. He was a non-executive director of Woolwich Building Society from 1998 to 2000. Nelson has been a Senior Adviser to Charterhouse Capital Partners since 2006.

He was a Trustee and Deputy Chairman of the National Gallery from 2010 until 2018 and a Director of the English National Opera from 2002 until 2010. He is Chairman of the National Gallery Trust, appointed in 2018, and Chairman of the Chichester Harbour Trust, appointed in 2013.

Nelson has been a member of the UK Prime Minister's Business Advisory group, and a member of the International Advisory Panel of the Monetary Authority of Singapore.

He is Deputy Lieutenant of West Sussex and was appointed a CBE in the 2018 New Year Honours.

== Personal life ==
John Frederick Nelson is the son of George Frederick Nelson and Betty Violet Roddick. Nelson married Caroline Vivien Hannam in 1976 and they have two sons and a daughter.

His outside interests are in the arts generally, opera, sailing, skiing and tennis.
