= Solent Sunbeam =

Type of sailboat

Boat
- Crew: 3

Hull
- LOA: 26 ft (7.9 m)

The Sunbeam (also known as the Solent Sunbeam) is a type of keelboat sailed frequently at Itchenor Sailing Club and Falmouth. It was designed by Alfred Westmacott in 1923 as an improved version of the Mermaid.
