= Cold Spring Harbor Beach Club =

- U.S. National Register of Historic Places
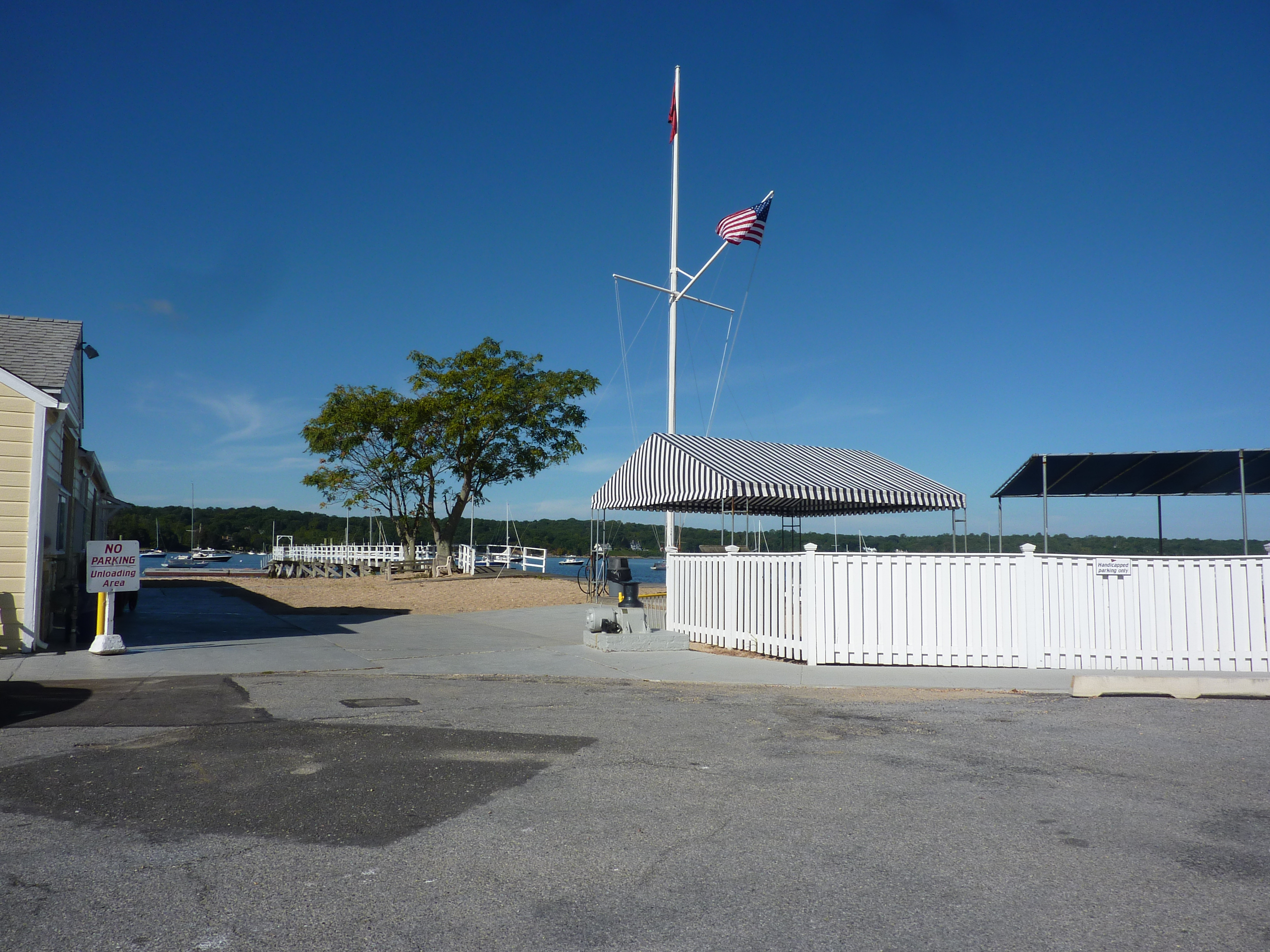
- Cold Spring Harbor Beach Club, September 2013

- Location within New York
- Location: 101 Shore Rd., Cold Spring Harbor, New York
- Coordinates: 40°52′34″N 73°28′10″W
- Area: 7.3 acres (3.0 ha)
- Built: 1888, 1923-1964, 1954
- Architect: Lefferts, J.B., casino builder
- Architectural style: Late Victorian
- NRHP reference No.: 12001037
- Added to NRHP: December 12, 2012

The Cold Spring Harbor Beach Club is a historic club complex located at Cold Spring Harbor, New York. The complex includes 4 buildings, 1 site, and 1 structure of historic significance. They are the main clubhouse building (also known as "The Casino", built 1888), a boathouse, caretaker’s cottage, pump house, tennis courts (1923-1964), and finger piers (1954).

It was added to the National Register of Historic Places in 2012.
