= Wallasey Yacht Club =

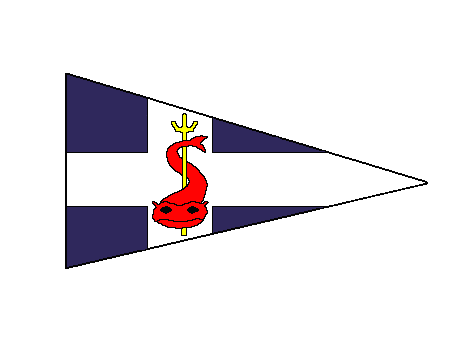
Wallasey Yacht Club burgee

Wallasey Yacht Club is based in Hope Street, New Brighton, on the Wirral Peninsula, England, near Liverpool. Founded in 1903, the club regularly sails on the River Mersey and New Brighton marine lake. The club's burgee is a red dolphin on a blue background with a white cross.

The club mainly sails the Seabird half rater but it also has dinghy and offshore fleets. The club hosts its annual regatta as part of the Wirral Regattas series where local sailors come to compete on the River Mersey.

== History ==
Around 1900, an increasing number of boats of all shapes and sizes started to make their appearance on the River Mersey, as the youths of the area adapted ships' lifeboats and river gigs to take to the water.

The two clubs in the area were felt to be too exclusive, and in 1903 it was decided that a new club be formed. This was to be called the Magazines Sailing Club, after an area of New Brighton where the preliminary meetings were held.

In 1903 the club fleet consisted of 12 boats: Comet, Constitution, Flora, Hypatia, Ivy, Markab, Mona, Naama, Rita, Dart, Cigarette and Gaunet. Over the years the club prospered, and other local clubs offered to amalgamate, but offers were refused.

By 1913, five seabird half raters had been acquired by club members, and class racing began. In 1925 there were 14 Half Raters, and the club was made association representative for the Mersey area.

Over these years the regattas grew in size, but the First World War brought the activity to a standstill, as 63 members joined up.

In 1921 the Magazines Sailing Club changed its name to the Wallasey Yacht Club, when Wallasey itself became a municipal borough. At the time of the name change the club burgee remained a white cross on a blue background, it wasn’t until May 1937 that a red dolphin round a gold trident, based on the Wallasey coat of arms, was added and this design has been used ever since. The present club house in Hope Street, New Brighton, has been occupied by the club since 1910.

The current membership is very keen to see the seabird half rater continue to flourish, and retain all the original design detail. A number of the boats have required major repair and even rebuilding, and attention to the original construction methods has been painstaking.

As a result of this enthusiasm, there are now 23 half raters in the club, most of which actively race during the April to September season.

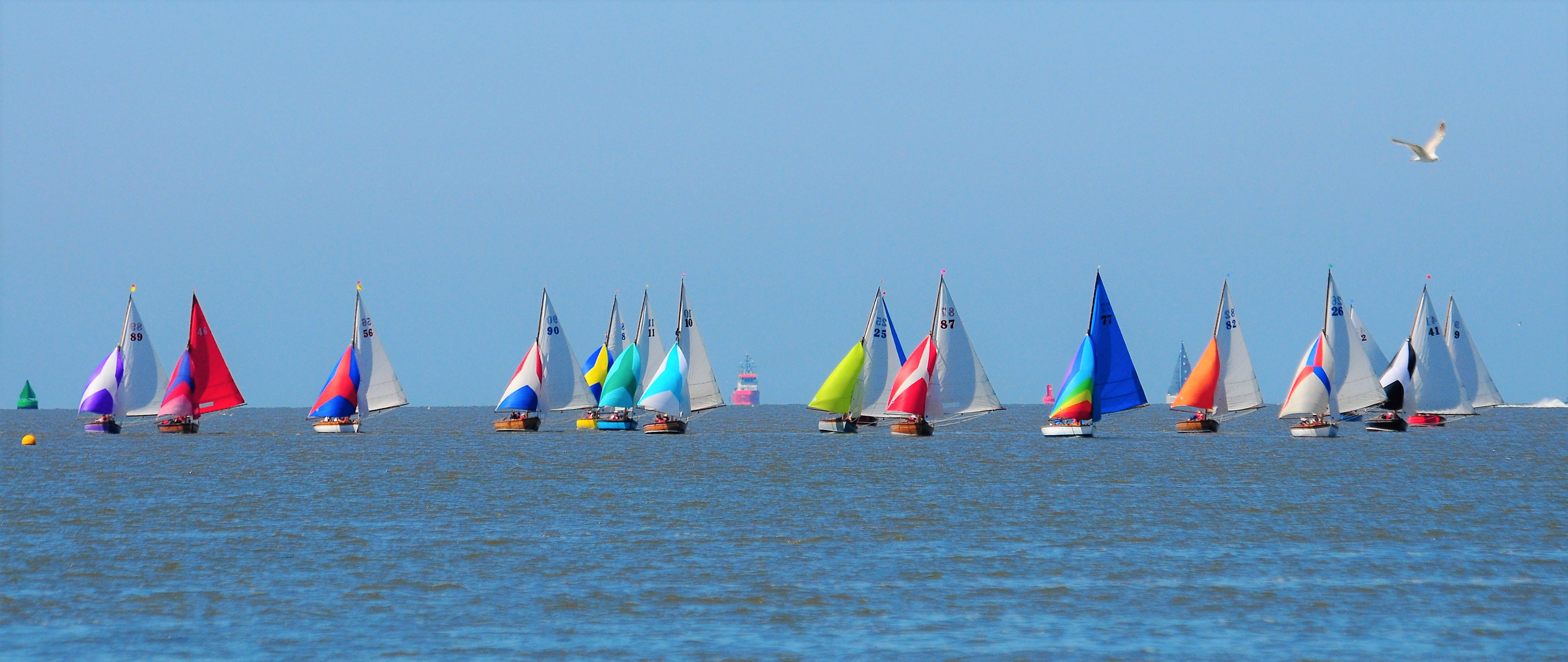
Seabird Half Raters in WYC Regatta 2018
