= Itchenor Sailing Club =

Sailing club located in Chichester Harbour

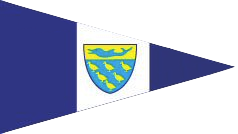
- Burgee

- Ensign
- Short name: ISC
- Founded: 1927; 99 years ago
- Location: West Itchenor, West Sussex, United Kingdom
- Commodore: Neil Hart
- Website: www.itchenorsc.co.uk

Itchenor Sailing Club is a sailing club located in Chichester Harbour which was founded in 1927.

== History ==
West Itchenor is situated on the prevailing wind's windward shore, in a well-protected position in the harbour. Unlike Bosham, Dell Quay and Emsworth, the village has access to water at all states of the tide. It has been a site of shipbuilding since the 18th century, providing the nation with a number of prominent warships during the Napoleonic Wars. Recreational and competitive sailing has typically taken place adjacent to the shipyard, with such events being organised and recorded by officers of the local customs house at the end of the 19th century. When the harbour's first sailing club was founded in Bosham in 1907, regatta activity moved from Itchenor Customs House to Bosham Sailing Club. The popularity of BSC grew to the extent that its committee thought it necessary to be renamed "Bosham and Itchenor Sailing Club" from 1918. BSC reverted to its original name in 1922.

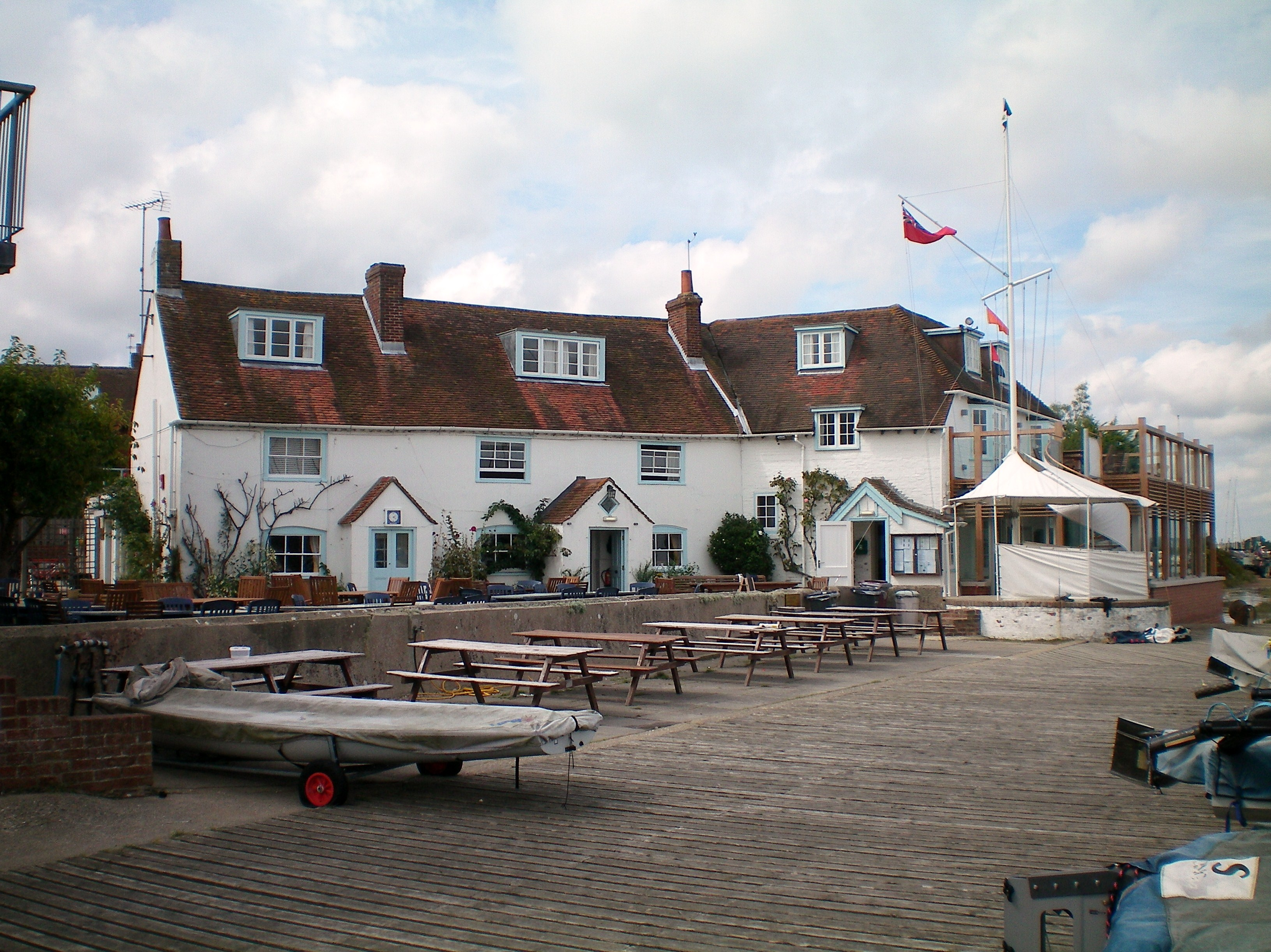
The Clubhouse

In November 1927 a group of 5 sailors circulated 48 letters of invitation to join a new sailing club in Itchenor. They were led by Dr B.S. Mends, who was elected Commodore at the first AGM. 39 of the 48 invitations were accepted and a total of 68 members were elected as founder members. The meeting also established the objectives of the club:

1. To encourage all forms of yachting and boat sailing by amateurs.
2. To encourage yacht and boat racing of all descriptions by the promotion of races and giving of prizes and by any other means which may from time to time be determined by the club.

With the club growing in number, it was decided in 1930 that a clubhouse be set up to accommodate its members. Upon acquiring a 17th-century fishermen's cottage overlooking the harbour, the memorandum of association was signed in the following year.

In 1937 ISC faced an existential threat when the Chichester Harbour Federation invited the Royal Corinthian Yacht Club to establish a South Coast branch in the harbour. Following a meeting between Commodore Thomas McMeekin and his RCYC counterpart, Tiny Mitchell, amalgamation proposals were circulated to the club membership and a referendum was announced to determine the matter. This sharply divided opinion and caused dissenting members to form a "protesting committee." When McMeekin's plans were narrowly rejected, he and his Vice Commodore announced that they would not seek re-election. In an attempt to restore confidence in the club's administration, Rear Commodore Geoffrey Lowles was put forward as a "unity candidate." He was proposed by William Tracy Wallace, who succeeded in uniting members to support Lowles as the new Commodore; Wallace arranged for over fifty individuals (comprising the differing cliques, factions, and recalcitrant members) to officially second him to the position.

With the outbreak of World War II, the sailing club was requisitioned by the British Army. An anti-aircraft gun was mounted to attack approaching Luftwaffe planes.

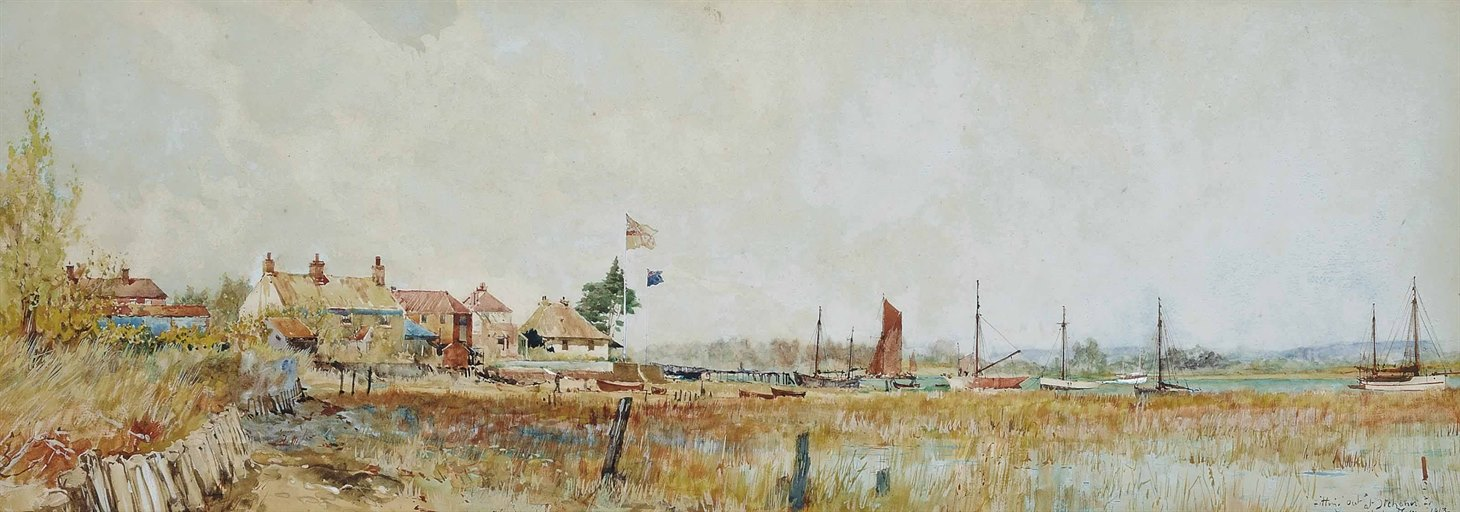
Fitting out at Itchenor by Charles Dixon, 1913

== Racing ==
The Sailing Club races every weekend from April to November with midweek racing for keelboats, as well as specific weeks for class regattas. A comprehensive programme is run for keelboat classes (National Swallow, Solent Sunbeam, X-One-Designs) and jetty dinghy classes (International 14, RSK6, RS800, RS200, International 420, Topper and Mirror). Open Meetings are held for most classes, including the annual Schools Week.

The Mirror fleet at Itchenor is the biggest and most active fleet in the country and possibly the world comprising just over 100 boats.

== Sailing events ==
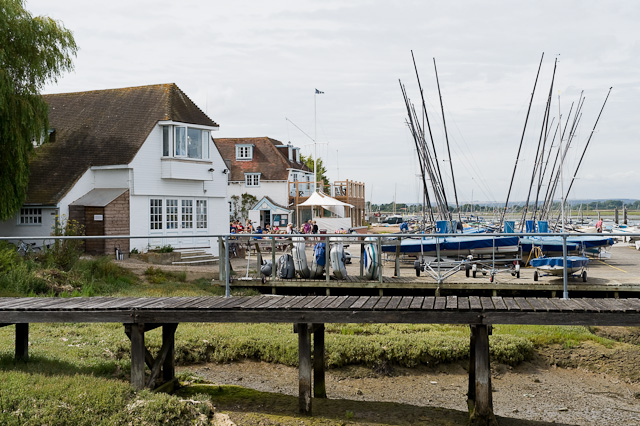
The Sailing Club in 2009

=== Junior Fortnight ===
Junior Fortnight is an annual series of racing that takes place over a fortnight during the summer holidays. It has its own committee that oversees the running of Junior Fortnight. As well as a racing programme which consists of ten to thirteen races in all, there is a social programme. The social programme includes two bops which occur on the first and last nights of the event, a talent show, themed parties, cricket matches and a prizegiving at the end of the fortnight.

The fortnight series, organised and run by Itchenor Sailing Club, sees competitors from neighbouring sailing clubs in Chichester Harbour, such as Hayling Island Sailing Club, West Wittering Sailing Club, Emsworth Sailing Club, Bosham Sailing Club and others.

=== Schools Week ===
Schools Week (also known as the Schools Championship) is an inter-schools sailing competition which is organised and run by Itchenor Sailing Club. It was started in 1953 under the name of 'The Public Schools Firefly Invitation Championships.' Currently the fleets include 420s, Fireflies and RS Fevas. Between 1997 and 1999 Laser Radials were introduced to the class but failed to catch on.

Competing schools have included Charterhouse, King's School, Canterbury, Magdalen College School, Oxford, Oundle, Portsmouth Grammar School, Sevenoaks, Sherborne, Tonbridge and Winchester College.

== Notable club members ==
- Vanessa Branson, businesswoman and sister of Richard Branson
- Michael Mates, MP for East Hampshire (1974–2010)
- Kate Winslet, actress and singer

Olympic medallists

- Sir Peter Scott, O-Jolle (1936) (bronze)
- David Bond, Swallow (1948) (gold)
- Stewart Morris, Swallow (1948) (gold)
- Charles Currey, Finn (1952) (silver)
- Iain MacDonald-Smith, Flying Dutchman (1968) (gold)
- Rodney Pattison, Flying Dutchman (1968) (gold) , Flying Dutchman (1972) (gold) , Flying Dutchman (1976) (silver)
- John Merricks, 470 (1996) (silver)
- Ian Walker, 470 (1996) (silver) , Star (2000) (silver)

== Sources ==
- Wright, Tony (1978). A History of Itchenor Sailing Club
