= Thomas Harrison Butler =

British ophthalmologist and amateur boat designer

Yonne class cutter

Thomas Harrison Butler, DM, FRCS(Eng) (19 March 1871 – 29 January 1945) was a British ophthalmologist and amateur boat designer. He published various designs of small, traditionally built yacht and was particularly concerned with the boat's handling under sail.

== Medical career ==
Butler graduated with an MA from Corpus Christi College, Oxford in May 1902, and received a Doctorate of Medicine (DM) at the same time. He practiced in Coventry, Birmingham and Leamington Spa, where he had private practices. He spent most of his time, however, on unpaid hospital work.

== Boat designer ==
Harrison Butler was "a strong believer in the 'metacentric shelf formula' to achieve good balance and handling under sail. The theory held that as a yacht heels under sail, its balance will depend on the immersed form of the hull, with different sections exerting varying degrees of buoyancy and aft sections possibly being more buoyant than forward sections. Metacentric shelf analysis plots the shifts in the varying buoyancies as a net value to windward or leeward and serves as a guide to achieving equal buoyancy in the dissimilar ends of a design. The work can now be done by computer, but when it was applied by the brain, hand and eye of Dr. Harrison Butler it produced famously sweet-handling boats, in the age of heavy weather helm."

In the days before computers, Harrison Butler was known to cut out paper cross sections of his hulls in order to calculate lines of symmetry and centres of mass. Boats built to his designs are noted for their sleek looks as well as their pleasant handling.

He wrote two books, Cruising Yachts: Design and Performance, and An Illustrated Guide to the Slit-Lamp, and was the subject of a 1980s BBC TV documentary.

== Selected designs ==
Harrison Butler designs are still being built, as for example this wooden HB Cyclone 2a under construction ca. 2006.

- Cyclone II Bermudan Cutter A small sailing yacht. Designed 1928, circa 7 built.

Overall Length: 25ft 6in 7.77m
Waterline: 22ft 6in 6.85m
Beam: 9ft 1in 2.76m
Draught: 4ft 6in 1.37m
Displacement: 13 000lbs

- Yonne Class Cutter Described by Harrison Butler as a 'sports model'. Designed 1931, circa 8 built.

Overall Length: 32ft 9in
Waterline: 22ft 6in
Beam: 8ft 6in
Draught: 4ft 6in

- Englyn Design A small sailing yacht – circa 8 (+ 2 close derivatives) built, including 'Almonde', 1933–1959

Overall Length: 26ft 6in
Waterline: 22ft 5in
Beam: 8ft 6in
Draught: 4ft 6in
Displacement: 7T (TM)

- Zyklon Similar to a Falmouth Quay Punt, although smaller and with traditional rigging. Versions of the Zyklon were built by Alfred Lockhart Ltd. and known as the 'Z' 4-tonner. Circa 45 built.

Overall Length: 21ft 9in
Waterline: 19ft
Beam: 7ft 2in
Draught: 4ft
Displacement: 7 400lbs

In addition to those above, a number of other Harrison Butler designs were built over the years, including:

- Hong Kong – 1909, 4 built
- Cyclone – 1919, 9 built
- Askadil – 1934, 5 built
- Bogle – 1934, 6 built
- Khamseen – 1934, 4 (including one new in 2015) built
- Omega – 1938, 7 built
- Irmiger – 1943, 1 built
- Thuella – 1944, 6 built
- Dream of Arden – 1945, 6 built

== The Harrison Butler Association ==
A Harrison Butler Association was formed in 1973 for anyone interested in his designs. It aims to keep track of Harrison Butler boats worldwide and help owners keep in touch. It holds two meetings and produces two newsletters annually.

== Trivia ==
Harrison Butler was the father-in-law of actress Joan Hickson.

== See also ==
- Bermuda rig
- Boat building
- Cutter
- Yachting
