= Sea View Yacht Club =

- Burgee

- Ensign
- Short name: SVYC
- Founded: 1893; 133 years ago
- Location: Esplanade, Seaview, Isle of Wight
- Commodore: Fiona Conway-Hughes
- Website: www.svyc.org.uk

The Sea View Yacht Club is in the village of Seaview, on the Isle of Wight, on the north-east coast of the island. Founded in 1893, its stated aim is 'to encourage amateur sailing and boat racing'.

The Club is well known for two designs of boat: the Mermaid (keel boat) and the Sea View One-Design (SVOD), also known as the Seaview Dinghy. Notable members include Olympic Gold Medallist Ben Ainslie.

== The Mermaids ==
The Mermaids are a fleet of 13 identical keelboats, owned by the Club. They are moored off Seaview from April through to October. There is an ISAF grade 3 Match race held annually in April to get the Season going. The first fleet of boats were built in 1907. The current fleet, of GRP boats, were built around the 2000 millennium. There is always a packed programme of races for both Charterers and Club Members throughout the April to October period.

== Sea View One-Design ==
There are two hundred of these classic design, clinker built, dinghies based in the village of Seaview. The boats continue to be hand-built in the village, by the family firm of V.A. Warren & Son. The Sea View One Design class was founded in 1931. The 75th Anniversary was celebrated with a fleet race on 18 August 2006, this was followed in the afternoon by a sailpast of 198 boats from the class.

The Seaview Dinghies are the largest local one-design fleet on the South Coast of England.
