= Water Wag =

One-design dinghy

Development
- Designer: Thomas B. Middleton (1900 design, James or Mamie Doyle)
- Location: Dublin Bay, Ireland
- Year: 1887
- Design: Open timber punt
- Role: "A class of sailing punts, with centre boards, all built and rigged the same, so that an even harbour race may be had with a light rowing and generally useful boat."
- Name: Water Wag

Boat
- Crew: 2

Hull
- Construction: Larch or silver spruce planking
- LOA: 13 feet 0 inches (3.96 m)
- Beam: 4 feet 10 inches (1.47 m)

Hull appendages
- Keel: Boilerplate

Rig
- Rig type: Sloop rig
- Mast height: 13 feet (4.0 m)

Sails
- Mainsail area: 75 square feet (7.0 m^{2})
- Jib/genoa area: None
- Spinnaker area: 60 square feet (5.6 m^{2})
- Total sail area: 10.22 m^{2} (110.0 sq ft)

The Water Wag is the oldest one-design dinghy in existence, having been devised in 1886 and formalised as a one-design class in Ireland in 1887. It was last modified in 1900. The class is still sailed to this day, notably with large Water Wag fleets racing during summer evenings from Dún Laoghaire harbour on Dublin Bay. The Water Wag class is administered by the Water Wags club, based in Dún Laoghaire.

The Water Wag inspired similar one-design fleets around Ireland and subsequently around the world.

== Design ==
In 1886 the Water Wag was designed as a one-design sailing and rowing boat by Thomas B. Middleton of Shankill Corinthian Sailing Club. Water Wags are silver-spruce-planked boats with a sloop rig and 75 square feet (7.0 m^{2}) of main sail, and with a 60 square feet (5.6 m^{2}) spinnaker and no jib. The boat is open-decked, with a single mast close to the bow. Middleton, who was a solicitor and not a professional yacht designer, prepared a concept sketch for the boat which may have been developed into a construction drawing by Robert McAllister of Dumbarton, Scotland. It is probable that McAllister reviewed his drawing with the eminent Scottish designer G.L. Watson before constructing the first boat "Eva" for Middleton in late 1886.

In 1900 the Water Wag design was changed by the writing of a much more prescriptive specification and a transom stern, lengthening the boat by 15 inches (380 mm) and making the stern of the boat much larger. The outward angled transom was designed to improve the aesthetics of the boat, and to save building cost. The sail area was increased from 75 square feet (7.0 m^{2}) to 110 square feet (10 m^{2}) by adding a jib. The new design was subject to some minor adjustments of sheer line and rudder size over the years 1901–1902 before the design, by James (or Maimie) Doyle from Dún Laoghaire, was finalised. Despite being a larger boat the cost of building was less.

The Class has never been tempted to adopt construction materials other than wood. Traditionally the sails were made of calico, cotton, and subsequently silk. In recent years Terylene and nylon have been used with the effect that coloured spinnakers are now used by most boats.

A variant of the original design, with its double-ended hull, found its way to Herne Bay Sailing Club in Kent, England, and during the 1920s and 1930s several boats were built locally and the class was actively raced during the 1930s and 1940s. These boats, however, were not built to the strict one-design principle of the originals and as well as differing from the original in several respects (foredeck, bowsprit, mast position) they also differed slightly from each other and so raced as a handicap fleet. By the early 1950s most of the boats had been sold out of the Kent club and racing ceased. One of the last boats to be built in Kent, by E and B Gammon at Herne Bay in 1947, is in the collection of the National Maritime Museum Cornwall.

A variant of the 1900 design was adopted by many clubs in India and Sri Lanka, the main difference being the use of teak planking which being heavier, resulted in the boat requiring more freeboard. A small foredeck was added to assist in keeping the boat drier.

Water Wags do not carry any symbol on the sails, and have no individual identifying mark beyond the sail number on the main sail and different spinnaker colours. Despite every boat of the Water Wag Class having a unique name, none of the names are painted or engraved on the hulls. All boats are generally referred to by their names and not by their numbers, particularly when hailing and congratulating a fellow sailor on a good race result.
