= Warsash One Design =

The Warsash One Design is a 27 ft Sloop-rigged sailing yacht which was constructed of glassfibre (GRP) by Russell Marine of Leigh on Sea, Essex, in the 1960s.

The yacht was designed by Fred Parker, a member of the Royal Institution of Naval Architects, and drew heavily on the design of the Folkboat. The principal differences between the Warsash One Design (WOD) and the Folkboat are the WOD’s counter stern (the Folkboat has a transom stern), masthead rig (the Folkboat has a fractional rig) and substantial encapsulated lead ballast, (the Folkboat's is cast iron) giving a ballast ratio of 60%.

The vessel was normally fitted with a small (6hp) inboard engine but on some boats a lazarette in the counter stern incorporated an outboard well with removable GRP plug. This allowed the yacht to be propelled by a small outboard motor. To do this, the GRP plug is removed and the leg and propeller of the outboard passed through the aperture to project below the outline of the hull.

Accommodation below is basic with settee berths to port and starboard. Forward of the main bulkhead is a small forepeak typically with a sea toilet (for example a Simpson Lawrence SL400) beneath a V-berth. A rudimentary galley is incorporated just forward of the companionway. Interior joinery is of marine plywood on hardwood frames and the hull interior finish is painted GRP.

The WOD was initially intended as an offshore one design class (a contemporary Royal Ocean Racing Club rating certificate gives a rating of 17.78 feet) but the WOD proved to be an extremely capable offshore cruiser and became a popular choice for long distance voyaging. Jim Dilley sailed WOD 25 ‘Reiger’, not fitted with an engine, from the UK to New Zealand. 'Reiger' was later sailed to Tasmania by her next owner Ben Tucker. Two WODs have participated in the Jester Challenge.

The principal dimensions are as follows:

- LOA 26 ft 8 inches
- LWL 19 ft 8 inches
- Beam 7 ft 3 inches
- Draft 4 ft 0 inches
- Sail area (main and working jib) 234 square feet
- Displacement 2 tons
- Lead ballast 1.2 tons
- Ballast ratio 60%
