= Colleen (keelboat) =

Type of boat

The Colleen is a one-design wooden sailing keelboat originally designed for sailing in Dublin Bay, Ireland.

The class was intended to fit into the Dublin Bay Sailing Club's grouping of classes, as Class 'B'. This was a replacement of the half and one rater. It was felt that a One-Design would ensure that boats did not become outdated within a short number of years.

It was designed for the Dublin Bay Sailing Club in 1896 by James E. Doyle, one of Kingstown's leading yacht designers and builders.

The Colleen is a half-decked gaff-rigged centreboard day boat with the centreboard case fixed externally under the boat.

The class stopped sailing in Dublin Bay in the early 1900s. After class racing finished in Dublin Bay many of the boats were shipped out to Argentina where the class thrived into the 1960s. Many of the Argentinian boats were renamed with stone names (Sapphire, Pearl, Beryl...).

Yachting historian Hal Sisk built the replica "Colleen Bawn" in 2003 - in glass-reinforced plastic.

== Colleen Builders ==
Hollwey- based in John Rogerstown Quay, Dublin Docklands, south of the Liffey.

Atkinson- based in Bullock Harbour, County Dublin.

J.E. Doyle- based in Kingstown (now Dun Laoghaire.)

== Colleen Statistics ==
Length overall- 22'-0"

Length waterline- 17'-0"

Beam- 6'-6"

Draft- 5'0" (centreboard down.)

      1'-6" (centreboard lifted.)

Sail Area- 252sq.ft.

== List of Colleens and Their Builders ==
Sail No. 1- Dorcha- Hollwey- 1897. Subsequently renamed Freida.

Sail No. 2- Sodelva- J.E. Doyle- 1897.

Sail No. 4- Sthoreen- Hollwey- 1897.

Sail No. 5- Marjorie- J.E. Doyle- 1897.

Sail No. 6, Ramona- J.E. Doyle- 1897. Subsequently renamed Zephyr and Meelagh.

Sail No. 7- Aroon- Hollwey- 1897. Subsequently renamed Gladys and Sapphire.

Sail No. 10- Iris- Atkinison- 1898. Subsequently renamed Owl, Wasp and Ruby.

Sail No. 11- Omadhaun- Atkinson-1898. Subsequently renamed Duck.

Sail No. 13- Fiola- Unknown builder- 1898.

Whippett- Hollwey- 1898. Subsequently renamed Emerald.

Aura- Atkinson- 1898.

Nance- J.E. Doyle- 1898.

Deirdre- Atkinson- 1898. Subsequently renamed Onyx.

Molly Bawn- Atkinson- 1898. Subsequently renamed Bonita, Manzanita, Daphne, and Beryl.

Serpolette- Atkinson- 1898.

Sheelah- Atkinson- 1899. Subsequently renamed Tero, Jasper, Hallyon, Nerophar.

Avantur- Hollwey- 1901.

In Law- Unknown Builder- 1901. Subsequently renamed The Flapper.

Wonderland- J.E. Doyle- 1903. Subsequently renamed Pearl, Beba and Elena.

Outlaw- J.E. Doyle- 1903.Subsequently renamed Diamond.

Maive- J.E. Doyle- 1903. Subsequently renamed Jasper II.

Zephyr- J.E. Doyle- 1904.

Omega- Unknown builder- 1904.

Chiquita- Hollwey- 1905. Subsequently renamed Topaz.

Seagull- J.E. Doyle- 1905. Subsequently renamed Cingalee.
