= Alfred Mylne =

Alfred Mylne (1872–1951) was a Scottish yacht designer, born in Glasgow. He founded A Mylne & Co. in 1896.

== Work ==
Alfred Mylne was apprenticed to the Scottish shipbuilders Napier, Shanks and Bell, and went on to work as a draftsman and apprentice to George Lennox Watson. Watson was the designer of the Royal Yacht HMY Britannia, the racing cutter first owned by Edward, Prince of Wales.

Mylne set up his own office in 1896. In 1906, Mylne was involved in establishing the International Metre Rule, a yacht-racing handicap rule. Mylne designed a number of race-winning boats, including the 19-metre class cutter Octavia in 1911. Four 15-metre class yachts and the early 12-metre class Cyra are listed as built to his designs, as well as the 8 metre Raven.

Boat designer Uffa Fox was a close friend of Mylne, and the latter appears regularly in the books Fox wrote before the Second World War. When Sir William Burton had his 12-metre class yacht, Marina, designed, this was reviewed in Uffa Fox's Second Book (1935).

"The mast of Marina, the 12-metre Alfred Mylne designed for Sir William Burton in 1935, was called upon to endure some very heavy strains before the racing season started, for on her passage from the Clyde to the South round the "Land" she met very bad weather... Though designed as a light-weather "12", Marina proved herself an able and seaworthy vessel, and came through that gale without damage to herself or her crew."

Mylne was joined in his office by Thomas Glen-Coats, and in 1908 Mylne and his apprentice Glen-Coats competed in the 12-metre class sailing event of the 1908 Summer Olympics, in the yachts Mouchette and Hera respectively. This was the only Olympic event ever to be held in Scotland (prior to 2012), and Hera won the gold medal.

During the First World War, the Bute Slip Dock Co (Mylne's yard at Ardmaleish point on the Island of Bute) produced hulls and components for Felixstowe F.3 and Felixstowe F.5 flying boats, as well as other Naval work. This introduced the company to new methods of construction and experience with new materials that were later adopted for use in Mylne's post war yacht designs.

The 41 ft Bermudan Cutter Medea (Ex Vladimir), see above photo, was designed by A Mylne in 1903 and built by Alexander Robertson & Sons in 1904. The yacht was subsequently bought by A Mylne in 1930, modified extensively, and stayed in the Mylne family for over 30 years.

Alfred Mylne II succeeded his uncle as the senior partner in the business in 1945. He was joined by Ian Nicolson as a partner in 1959. A.Mylne & Co continues to trade as an independent yacht design company Mylne Yacht Design, and is managed within the portfolio of Marine Design International Ltd.
