= Long Loch =

Long Loch may refer to:

- Long Loch (East Renfrewshire), an old freshwater loch in East Renfrewshire, Scotland
- Long Loch (Angus), a freshwater loch in Angus, Scotland

== See also ==
- Loch Long (disambiguation)
