= 15 Metre =

Class of yacht

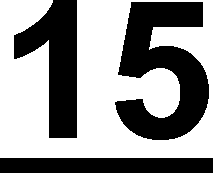
- Class symbol

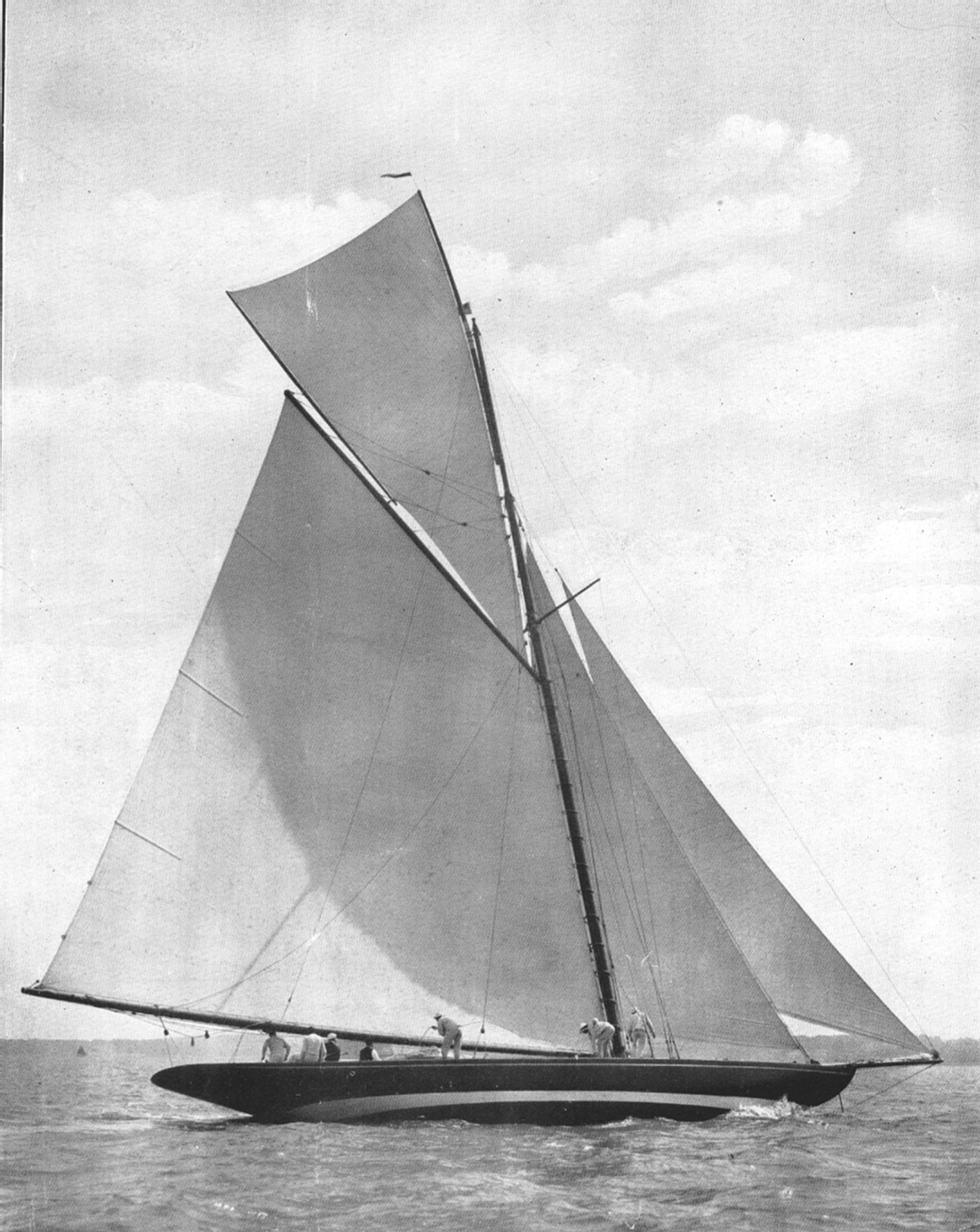
- The 15mR Ma'oona in 1908.

Development
- Year: 1907 (design rule)
- Design: Development class

The IYRU Fifteen Metre class yachts are constructed to the First International rule of 1907. A total of twenty 15mR yachts were built between 1907 and 1917, the four that have survived are still actively raced.

== History ==
The IYRU International Rule was set up in 1907 to replace the YRA 1901 revised Linear Rating Rule. The IYRU 15mR boats would replace the YRA 52-raters and open competition to foreign nations, replacing local or national systems with a unified rating system across Europe. The rule changed several times, but the 15mR boats only raced in the first rule of 1907. The twenty boats that were built, were raced in Spain, France, Britain and Germany. The rule was proposed for competition in the 1908 Olympics but there were no entries.

== 1907 Rule ==
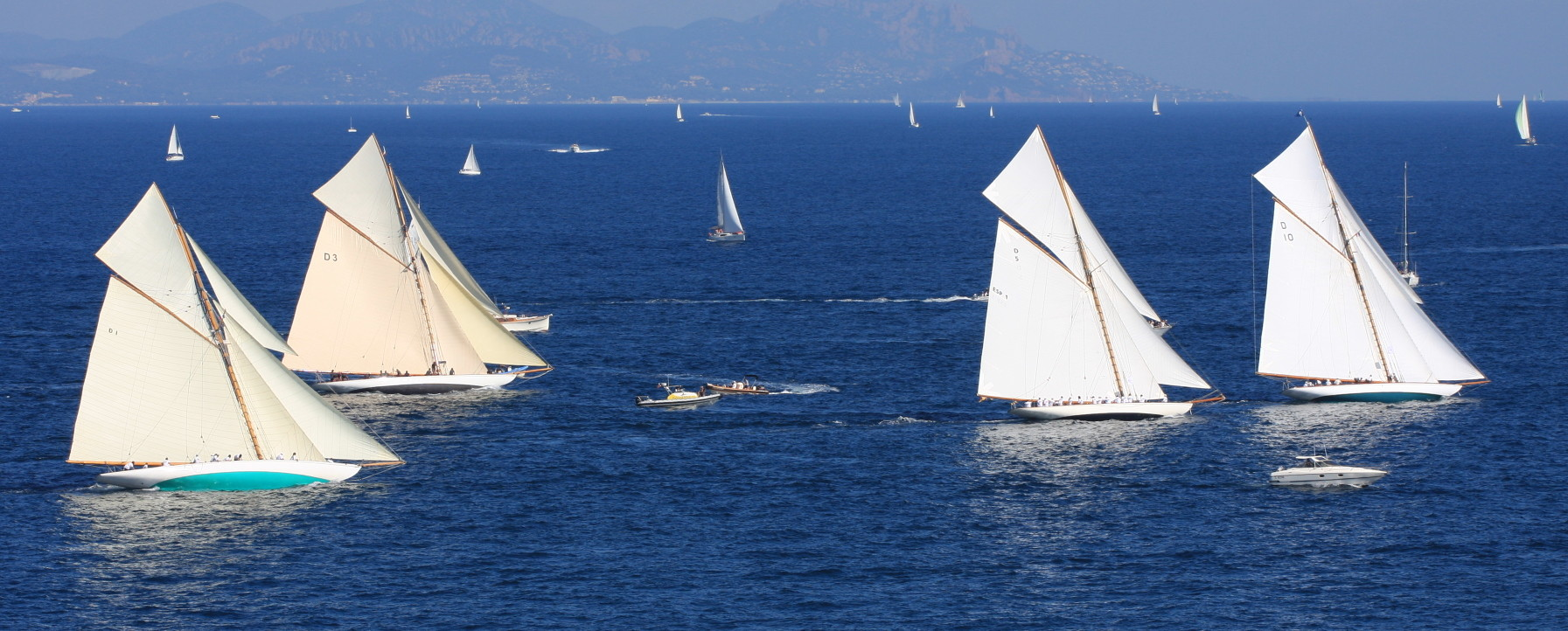
The four restored 15mRs in their first races together

The 15-Metre class is a construction class, meaning that the boats are not identical but are all designed to meet specific measurements in a formula. In their heyday, Metre classes were the most important group of international yacht racing classes, and they are still actively raced around the world. "Metre" does not refer to the length of the boat, but to her rating; the length overall of 15mR boats measuring almost 30 metres (98 ft).

The 15mR formula used in the First International Rule from 1907 to 1920:

$15~\mbox{m}=\frac{\textrm{L}+B+\frac{1}{2}G+3d+\frac{1}{3}\sqrt{S}-F}{2}$

where

- L = load waterline length in metres
- B = beam in metres
- G = chain girth in metres
- d = difference between girth and chain in metres
- S = sail area in square metres
- F = freeboard in metres

== Boats ==
Launch	Yacht	Sail no.			Designer	Shipyard	First owner	Details
1907	Ma'oona				Alfred Mylne	(Scotland) Robert McAlister & Son	J. Talbot Clifton	later sold to Almeric Paget
1907	Shimna				William Fife III	(Scotland) Alexander Robertson & Sons	William Yates	later rechristened Slec, and Yildiz in 1938. damaged and broken up in Turkey 1949.
1908	Mariska	D1			William Fife III	(Scotland) Fife & Son	A. K. Stothert	restored by the Charpentiers Réunis de Méditerranée in 2009
1909	Ostara	D2			Alfred Mylne	(Scotland) Robert McAlister & Son	William P. Burton	
1909	Anémone II				C. Maurice Chevreux	(France) Chantier Vincent, Cannes	Philippe de Vilmorin	
1909	Encarnita				Joseph Guédon	(Spain) Karpard de Pasajes	Marquis of Cuba	
1909	Hispania	D5			William Fife III	(Spain) Karpard de Pasajes	King Alfonso XIII	restored by the Astilleros de Mallorca in 2012
1909	Tuiga	D3	D9	1	William Fife III	(Scotland) Fife & Son	17th Duke of Medinaceli	owned in the 1920s by Warwick Brookes. rechristened Betty IV, Dorina, Kismet III. restored by Fairlie Restorations in 1993
1909	Vanity	D4			William Fife III	(Scotland) Fife & Son	W. & Benn Payne	
1910	Paula II	D2	D8		Alfred Mylne	(Scotland) Robert McAlister & Son	Ludwig Sanders	
1910	Tritonia	D3			Alfred Mylne	(Scotland) Alexander Robertson & Sons	Graham C. Lomer	later rechristened Jeano, Gerd II, Rinola, Fortuna II, Cisne Branco and Albatroz. served in the Gremio de Vela da Escola Navala in Brazil until 1986
1910	Sophie-Elisabeth	D6	D4		William Fife III	(Scotland) Fife & Son	L. Biermann	1913/1914 sold to G.Eyde, Norway, and rechristened Beduin, later Magda X
1911	Senta				Max Oertz	(Germany) Max Oertz	Duke of Saxe-Altenburg	
1912	Istria	D7			Charles E. Nicholson	(England) Camper & Nicholsons	Charles C. Allom	World's first Marconi topmast. broken up in Norway 1924.
1912	The Lady Anne	D10			William Fife III	(Scotland) Fife & Son	George Coats	restored by fairlie Restorations in 1999 with her 1914 rig configuration
1913	Pamela	D1			Charles E. Nicholson	(England) Camper & Nicholsons	S. Glen L. Bradley	
1913	Paula III	D2	D8		Charles E. Nicholson	(England) Camper & Nicholsons	Ludwig Sanders	
1913	Isabel Alexandra	D5			Johan Anker	(Norway) Anker & Jensen	E. Luttrop	
1913	Maudrey	D3			William Fife III	(Scotland) Fife & Son	W. Blatspiel Stamp	
1917	Neptune				Johan Anker	(Norway) Mandrup Abel	S. Klouman	
