= Sandbank, Argyll =

Village in Scotland

Coordinates: 55.979°N 4.946°W

Sandbank: Scottish Gaelic: Taigh a' Chladaich
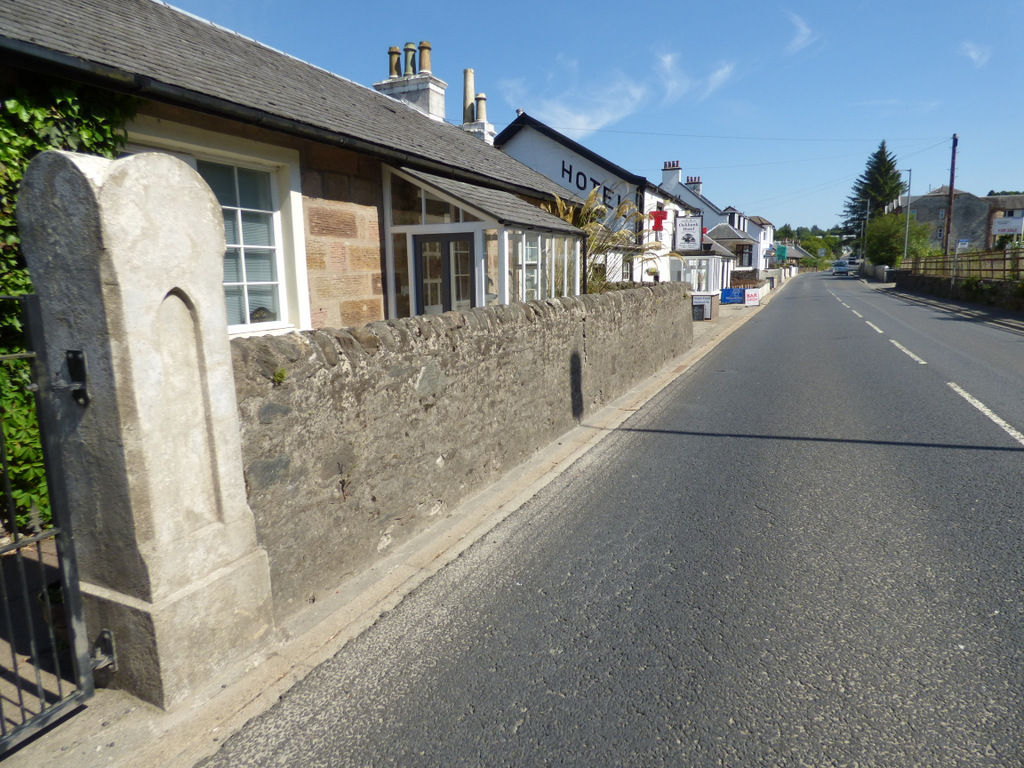
- Looking southeast along the A815 in Sandbank

- Location within Argyll and Bute
- Population: 1,320 (2020)
- OS grid reference: NS 163 802
- Council area: Argyll and Bute
- Lieutenancy area: Argyll and Bute
- Country: Scotland
- Sovereign state: United Kingdom
- Post town: DUNOON, ARGYLL
- Postcode district: PA23
- Dialling code: 01369
- Police: Scotland
- Fire: Scottish
- Ambulance: Scottish
- UK Parliament: Argyll, Bute and South Lochaber
- Scottish Parliament: Argyll and Bute

Sandbank (Scottish Gaelic: an Oitir or Taigh a' Chladaich) is a village in Argyll and Bute, Scotland. It is located 2.5 miles (4 kilometres) north of Dunoon on the coastal A815 (low road) or the inland A885 (high road). It sits on the southern shore of the Holy Loch, a sea loch of the Firth of Clyde.

== History ==
=== Robertsons Yachtbuilders ===
Alexander Robertson started repairing boats in a small workshop at Sandbank in 1876, and Alexander Robertson & Sons went on to become one of the foremost wooden boat builders on the River Clyde. The 'golden years' of Robertson's yard were in the early 1900s, when they started building classic 12- and 15-metre racing yachts. Robertsons was well known for the quality of its workmanship and was chosen to build the first 15-metre yacht designed by William Fife (Shimna, 1907). More than 55 boats were built by Robertsons in preparation for the World War I, and the yard remained busy even during the Great Depression in the 1930s, as many wealthy businessmen developed a passion for yacht racing on the Clyde. During World War II, the yard was devoted to Admiralty work, producing a wide range of large high-speed Fairmile Marine motor boats. After the war, the yard built the successful one-class Loch Longs and two David Boyd designed 12-metre challengers for the America's Cup: Sceptre (1958) and Sovereign (1964). Due to difficult business conditions, the Robertson family sold the yard in 1965, and it was turned over to GRP production work until it closed in 1980. During its 104-year history, Robertson's Yard built around 500 boats, many of which are still sailing today. The yard ceased trading in the early 1980s, and the site was levelled soon after. It has since been replaced by residential building and the new Holy Loch Marina development.

=== U.S. Navy years ===
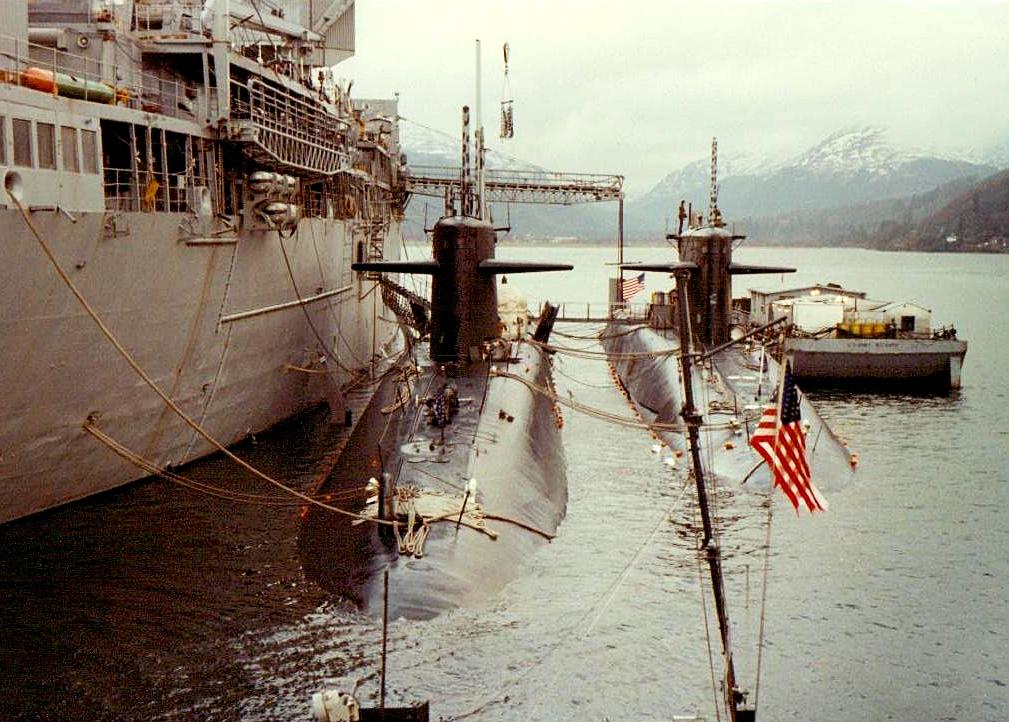
U.S. submarine base

Sandbank was the site of the shore facilities of the U.S. Navy submarine base in the Holy Loch from 1961 to 1992, part of the U.S. Atlantic Fleet. It was, for thirty years, until the end of the Cold War, the home port of the U.S. Navy's Submarine Squadron 14. As of 2024, part of the old navy complex that was the former location of Morris & Lorimer's boat building yard, is a timber loading berth and marina.

== Sport and recreation ==
=== National Cycle Route 75 ===
Sandbank is on the National Cycle Route 75, which runs between Edinburgh and Tarbert. The National Cycle Network is maintained by sustrans.

=== Holy Loch Sailing Club ===
The Holy Loch Sailing Club is situated in Sandbank.

=== Holy Loch Marina ===
Sandbank is the location of the Holy Loch Marina, a development with over 200 berths.

== Amenities ==
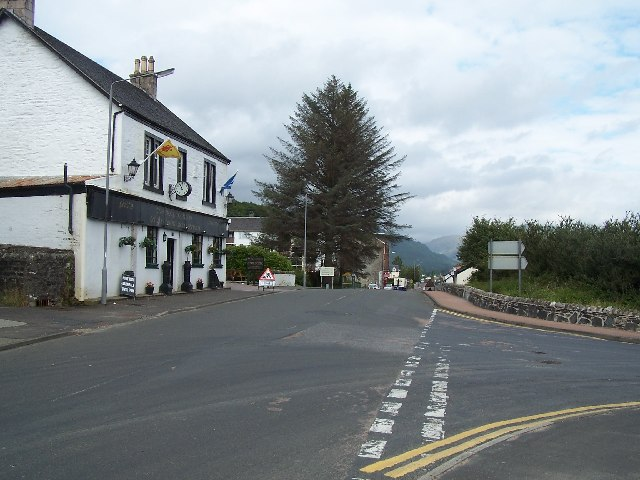
The Holy Loch Inn stands at the junction of the A815 (Rankin's Brae in the village) and A885 roads

Sandbank Primary School was originally located in the village centre between 1864 and 1977, when it moved to a new building to the southeast of the village, but still on the high road.

As of 2026, the only permanent public house in Sandbank is Holy Loch Inn, which reopened in February of that year.

The former Sandbank Parish Church (built in 1868) stands on the high road. Its congregation merged with that of Kirn Parish Church in 2017, becoming Kirn & Sandbank Parish Church, and its church building was put on the market.

== Cemetery ==
Cowal Cemetery is located on the high road (A885) between Sandbank and Dunoon. It was established in 1972.

== Gallery ==
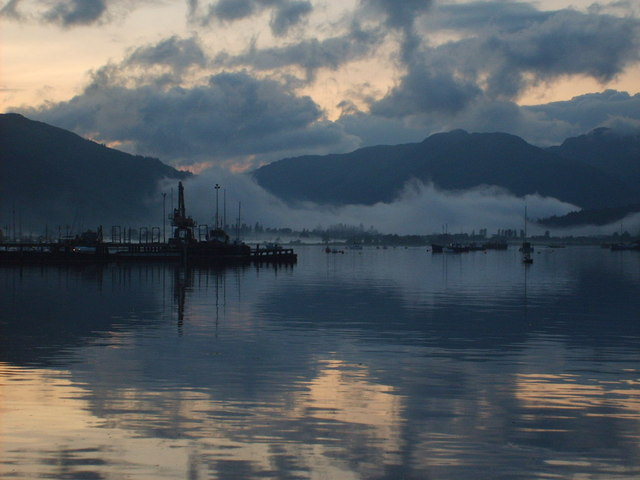
Dusk on the Holy Loch

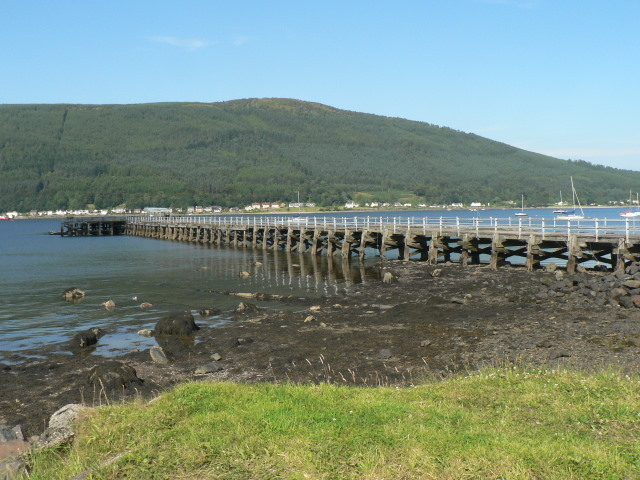
Ardnadam

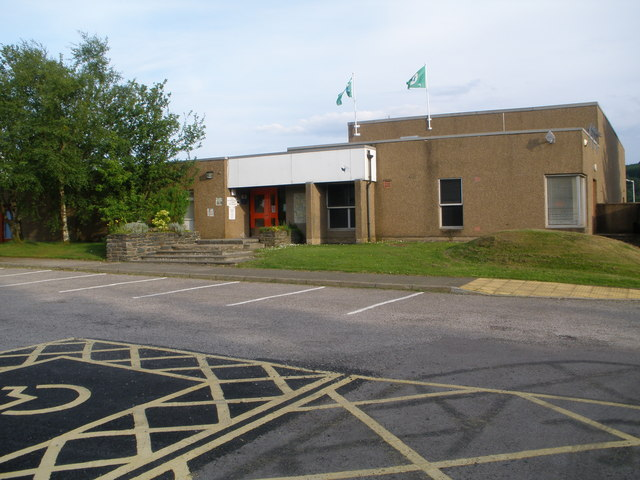
Sandbank Primary school
