= Stjärnbåt =

- Class symbol

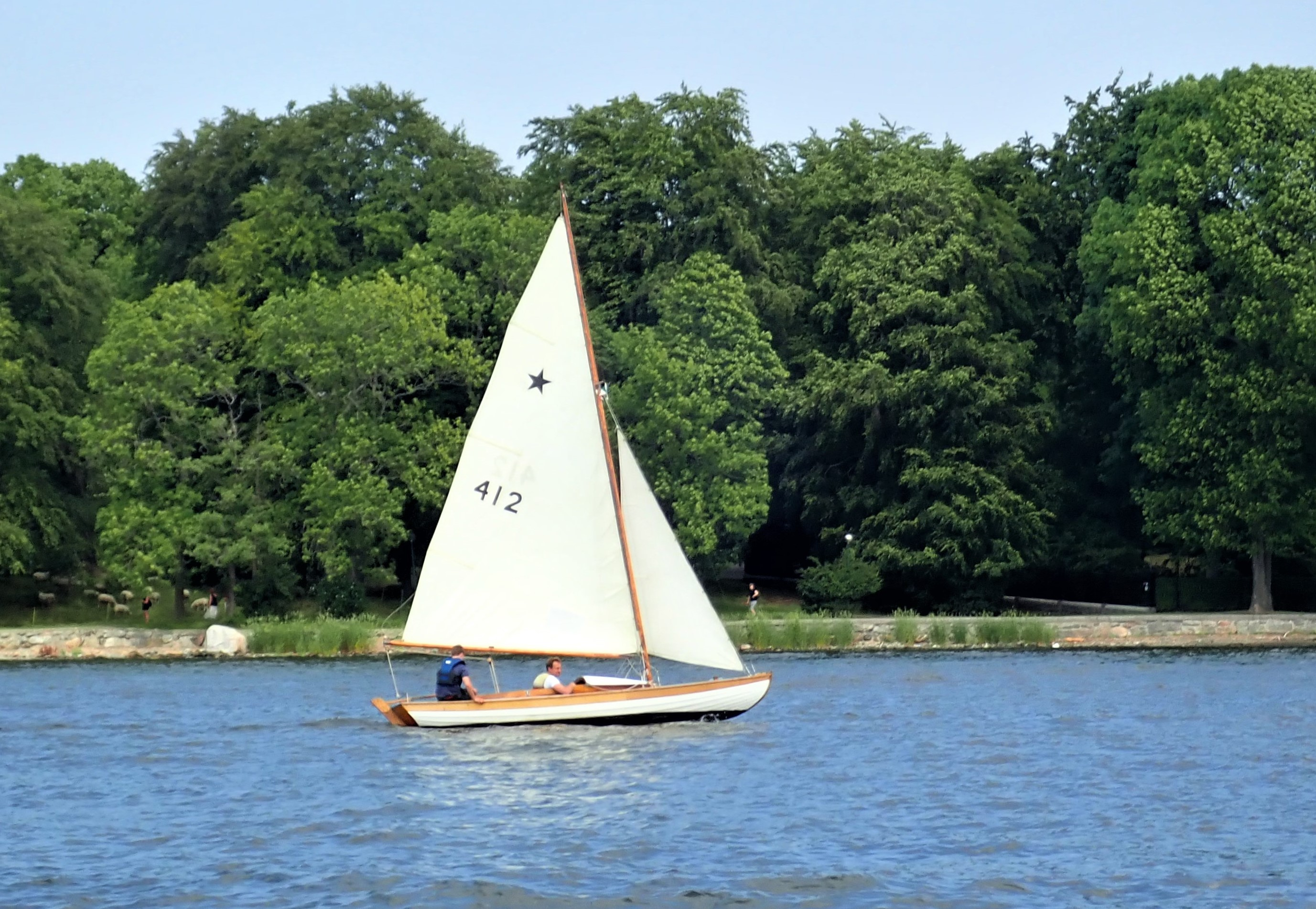

Development
- Designer: Janne Jacobsson
- Location: Sweden
- Year: 1913
- Name: Stjärnbåt

Boat
- Draft: 0.73 m (2.4 ft)

Hull
- Construction: clinker built
- LOA: 5.50 m (18.0 ft)
- Beam: 1.60 m (5.2 ft)

Hull appendages
- Keel: Iron

Stjärnbåt (lit. 'Star boat') is a sailboat class designed by Janne Jacobsson with over 530 units built.

== History ==
A Janne Jacobsson-design won a design competition for a utility boat held by Royal Gothenburg Yacht Club in 1913.

The Stjärnbåt is a typical style for the west coast of Sweden and is clinker-built, usually in pine with the sheer strake (the top plank) in oak. The design was finalised by the Royal Gothenburg Yacht Club between 1927 and 1928 with the first 21 vessels being commissioned by the club. From 1930 it was also built in Finland but with a slightly smaller sail area (14 square metres instead of 15 square metres) and was called the Vingbåt (lit. 'Wing boat') with over 100 units built. In the British Isles since 1937 there is Loch Long OD which is a Stjärnbåt with some minor modifications. It was designed by James Croll after a visit to Sweden. There are over 100 Loch Long One Designs still sailing.

In the 1950s and 1960s, there were often regattas with 50 to 60 boats.

All or almost all of the successful race sailors who started their careers in the 1930s till the 1960s have sailed the Stjärnbåt. Examples including, Per Gedda, Pelle Petterson, John Albrechtson, Peter Norlin, the Sundelin brothers and many others.

When the Stjärnbåt faced competition from plastic and plywood boats in the 1960s, an attempt was made with a more modern and faster rig (Stjärnbåt 66) but there wasn't much success and the idea was discontinued.
