= Istria (yacht) =

- Class: 15-metre
- Designer(s): Charles Ernest Nicholson
- Builder: Camper & Nicholsons; Gosport, Hampshire
- Launched: 1912
- Owner(s): Charles Carrick Allom
- Fate: Broken up 1924

The 15mR racing yacht Istria was designed by Charles Ernest Nicholson and built at the Camper & Nicholsons yard in Gosport, Hampshire, in 1912 for Sir Charles Carrick Allom (Yard number 204). She was the first large yacht to be built with laminated frames and planking to save weight, the first to feature a Marconi topmast and the first to feature a dinghy cockpit. She was broken up in 1924 in Norway.

== Design ==
In order to reduce the wetted surface yet retain stability, Istria's hull shape consisted of a long forward overhang and a wide beam at the waterline. Yachting Monthly described her as "Short on the waterline, with large displacement, a fine tail and a useful snout, she would not have been a pretty vessel had she not proved clever. But as I have always insisted that efficiency is beauty, the blue 'fifteen' was admired". Her midsection also featured a distinctive tumblehome, a feature that Nicholson would repeat in subsequent boats designed to the IYRU International rule.

=== The first Marconi mast ===
Nicholson devised a topmast that slotted atop the mainmast, and fitted with a track to fasten the topsail luff. This design eliminated the need for a topsail yard, thus permitting a lighter and loftier rig as well as easier hoisting and dowsing. Nicholson produced similar rigs for Pamela and Paula III and the rig was dubbed "Marconi mast" because the elaborate standing rigging reminisced a radio mast.

=== Dinghy cockpit ===
For the sake of safety in case a yacht should flounder, the rules at the time stated that a dinghy should be on the deck of the yacht during racing, and was typically stored over the main skylight. In order to reduce the windage, Nicholson created an open dinghy with a gunwale overhang which could be recessed into an aperture of the deck of the yacht, the open dinghy cockpit thus serving as the yacht's cockpit. When the Istria attended her first race, all the opposition protested against the arrangement. However, after successfully proving that the dinghy could be launched in under 10 seconds, the protests subsided.

=== Approximate dimensions ===
Length on deck	23.94 m
Load waterline length	14.7 8m
Beam	4.16 m
Draught	2.82 m
Displacement	40 tons

== Race history ==
In her first season, the Istria started in 31 races in European waters and won 29 of them. Originally 60 races had been planned but due to very strong winds there were only 43 starts. Over the following seasons up to the start of the First World War; The Istria won a further 43 races from 50 starts, thus making a very impressive 72 wins from 81 starts.

The Istria''s success briefly encouraged Allom to build a challenger for the America's Cup in 1913, but he decided to concentrate on improving the Istria when she faced a stiffening competition from newer European boats. The Istria' remained dominant throughout her racing career.
