= Sandbank Parish Church =

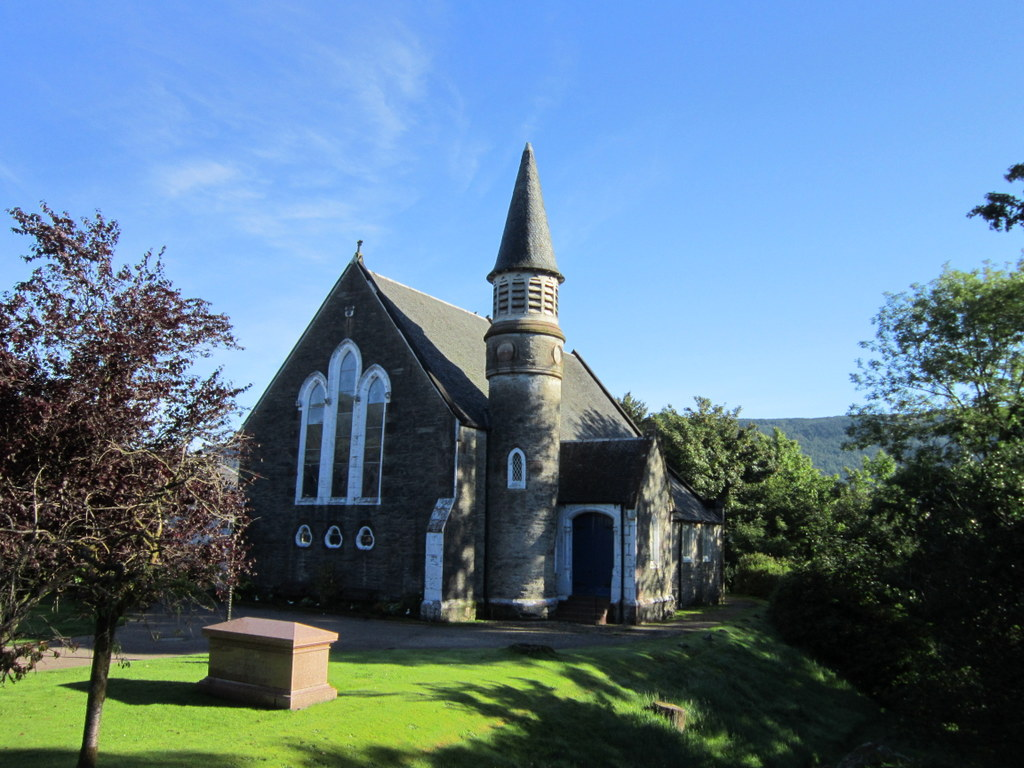
- Pictured in 2013
- Sandbank Parish Church
- 55°58′50″N 4°56′49″W
- Location: Sandbank, Argyll
- Country: Scotland
- Denomination: Church of Scotland

History
- Status: Closed

Architecture
- Functional status: Closed
- Heritage designation: Category C listed building
- Designated: 14 March 2007
- Architectural type: Gothic
- Years built: 1868 (158 years ago)

Sandbank Parish Church is a former Church of Scotland church building in Sandbank, Argyll, Scotland. Completed in 1868, it was designated a Category C listed building in 2007. It stands on the A885 high road between Sandbank and Dunoon.

According to Francis Hindes Groomes' Gazetteer of Scotland, the church was built as a chapel of ease. Its stained-glass windows were moved here from the congregational church in 1936.

Its congregation merged with that of Kirn Parish Church in 2017, becoming Kirn & Sandbank Parish Church, and its church building was put on the market.

== See also ==
- List of Church of Scotland parishes
