= Charles Allom =

British decorator (1865–1947)

Sir Charles Allom
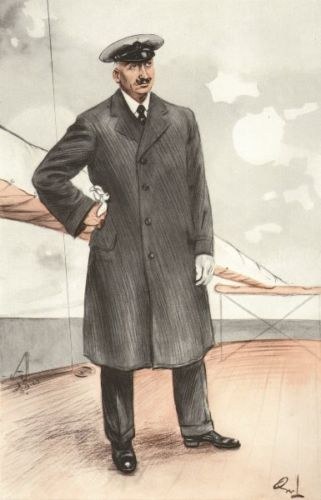
- 1913 caricature of Allom aboard his yacht Istria
- Born: 16 June 1865; Kensington, London, England
- Died: 1 June 1947 (aged 81); Potter's Bar, Middlesex, England
- Occupations: Decorator and architect

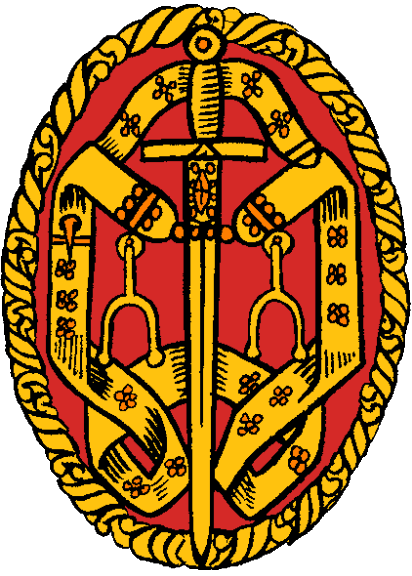
Insignia of a Knight Bachelor

Sir Charles Carrick Allom (1865–1947) was an eminent British decorator, who trained as an architect being knighted for his work on Buckingham Palace.

The son of Arthur Allom, he was a grandson of architect Thomas Allom and painter Thomas Carrick. Among his American clients in the years preceding World War I was Henry Clay Frick, for whom Allom furnished houses in cooperation with art dealer, Sir Joseph Duveen. Allom furnished the Henry Clay Frick House on 71st Street and Fifth Avenue which today houses the Frick Collection, and the neo-Georgian house, Clayton at Roslyn, Long Island, designed by Ogden Codman Jr., that was bought for Frick's daughter-in-law. For the grand rooms in Frick's New York house, Sir Charles, whose London workshops produced the plasterwork and boiseries, kept the furnishings muted, not to compete with Frick's collection of paintings. In 1925, when William Randolph Hearst purchased an ancient castle, St. Donat's in Wales, his choice to furnish it fell upon Sir Charles.

== Biography ==
In 1914, Allom and Charles Ernest Nicholson of Camper and Nicholsons, a boat-building firm, formed the Gosport Aircraft Company. The firm built a number of flying-boats for the British Government and proposed a series of designs during 1919. The venture closed in 1920 following the death of its chief designer, flying boat pioneer John Cyril Porte.

Shortly after World War I, Allom decided that he needed a more prominent position in New York. He purchased the house on Madison Avenue built by Carrère and Hastings in 1893 for Dr Christian Herter which the firm White, Allom & Company occupied until 1933. Allom divided his time between London and New York. Returning to London from one of his transatlantic trips in 1925, Sir Charles remarked on the American work ethic and was quoted in Time magazine. In 1931, White, Allom was among the stellar cast of furnishers and decorators creating a grand but homey atmosphere for the new Waldorf-Astoria Hotel on Park Avenue.

The style generated by Allom, White was distinctly old-fashioned. It appealed to Queen Mary, who was a connoisseuse of eighteenth-century English porcelain and furniture. And when the Empress of Britain was launched the same year as the "new" Waldorf-Astoria, among its modern Art Deco decors, the "Mayfair Lounge" by White, Allom was the one space in Edwardian Renaissance manner.

Sir Charles died in 1947.

== Legacy ==
White Allom was acquired by Holloway as Holloway White Allom in 1960.
