= William Fife =

Scottish yacht designer (1857–1944)

William Fife Jr.
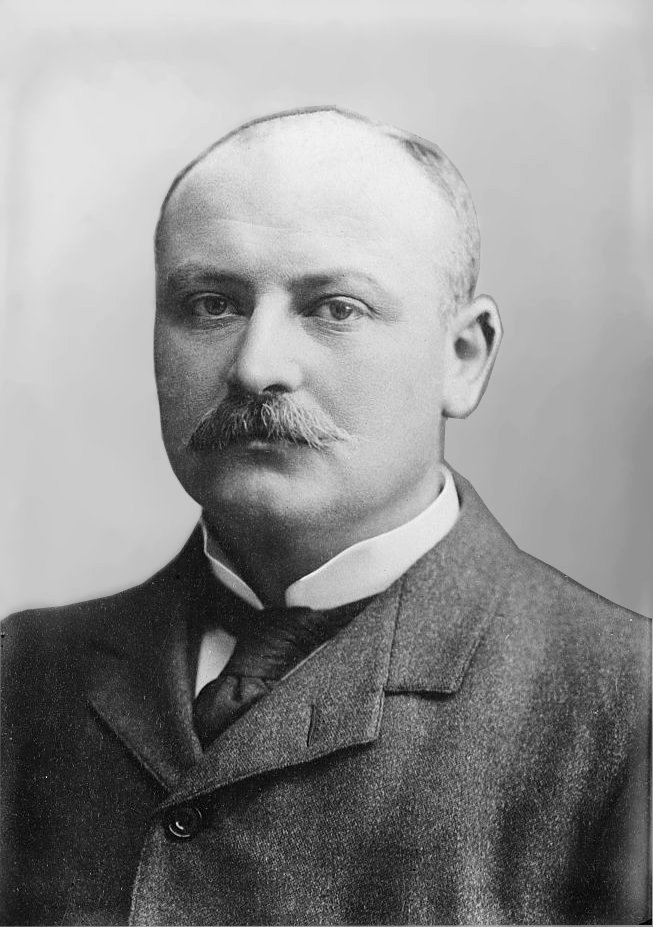
- Fife in 1903
- Born: 15 June 1857; Fairlie, North Ayrshire, Scotland
- Died: 11 August 1944 (aged 87); Fairlie, North Ayrshire, Scotland
- Other names: William Fife, III
- Occupation: Yacht designer

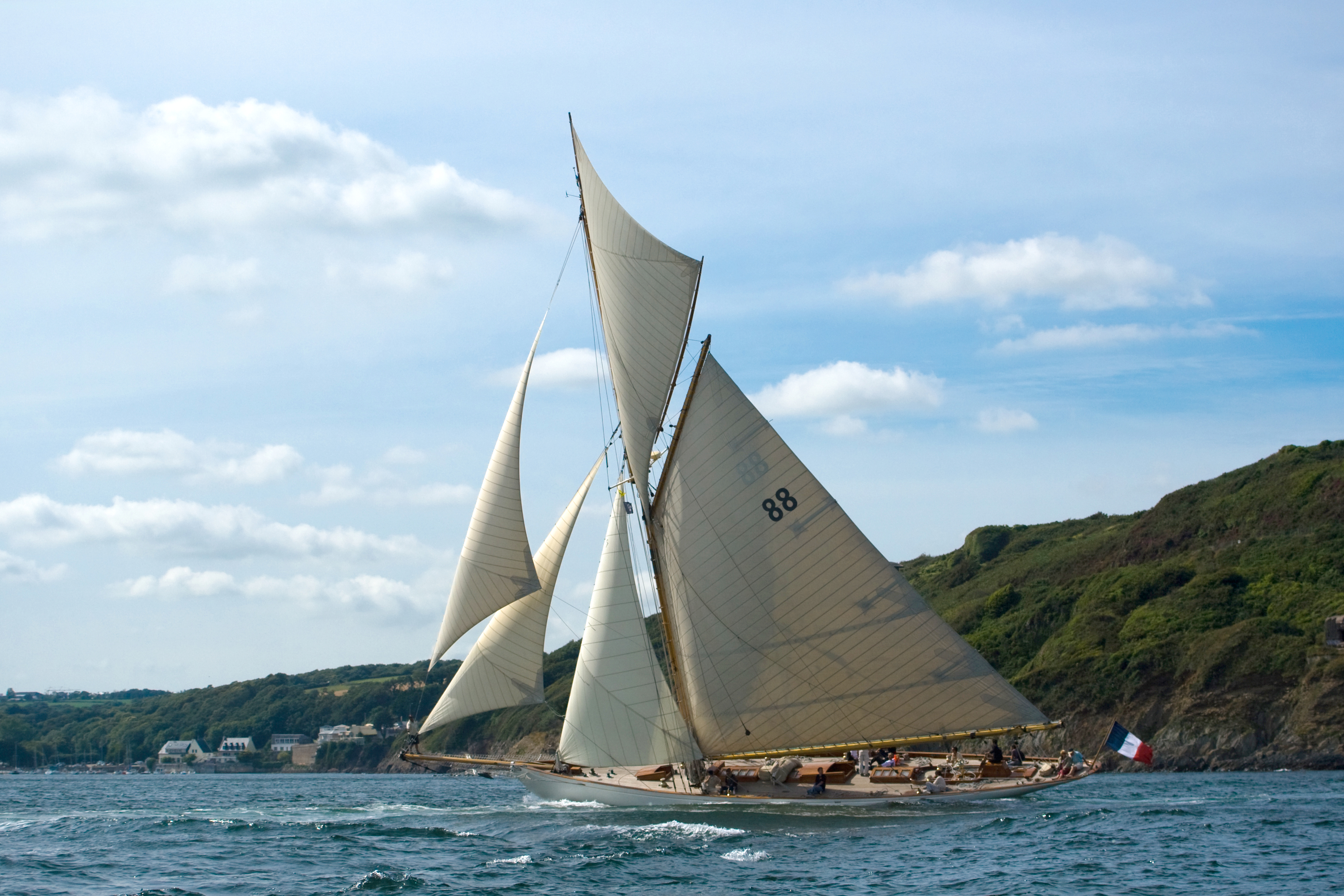
Moonbeam III (1903) pictured in 2008

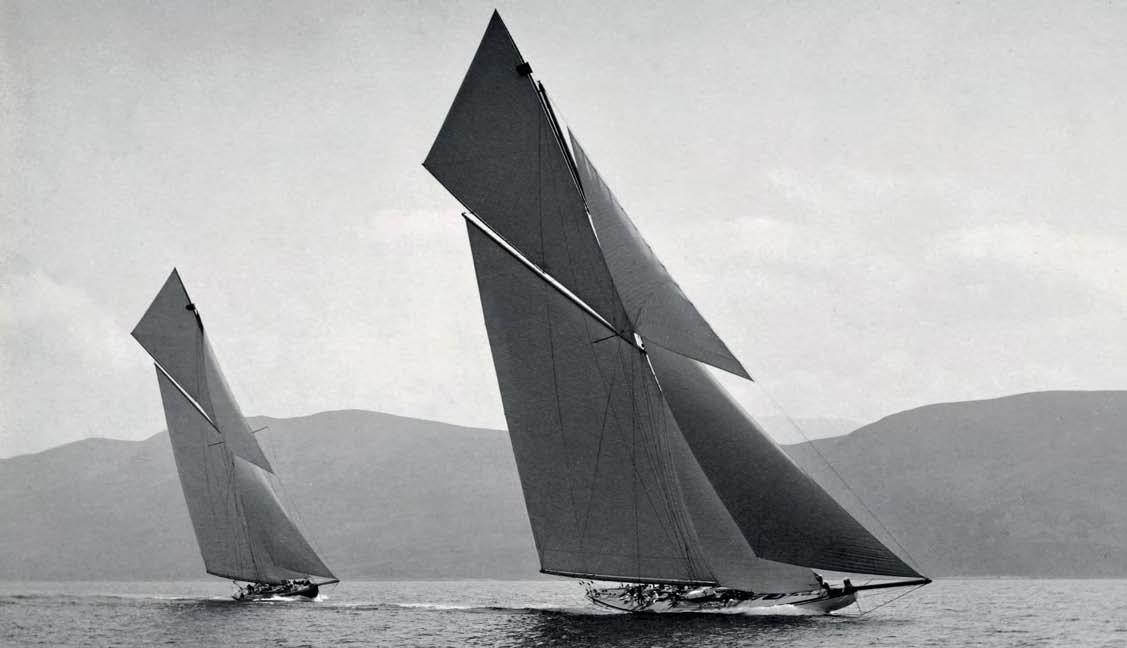
Shamrock III (1903) launched in Dumbarton

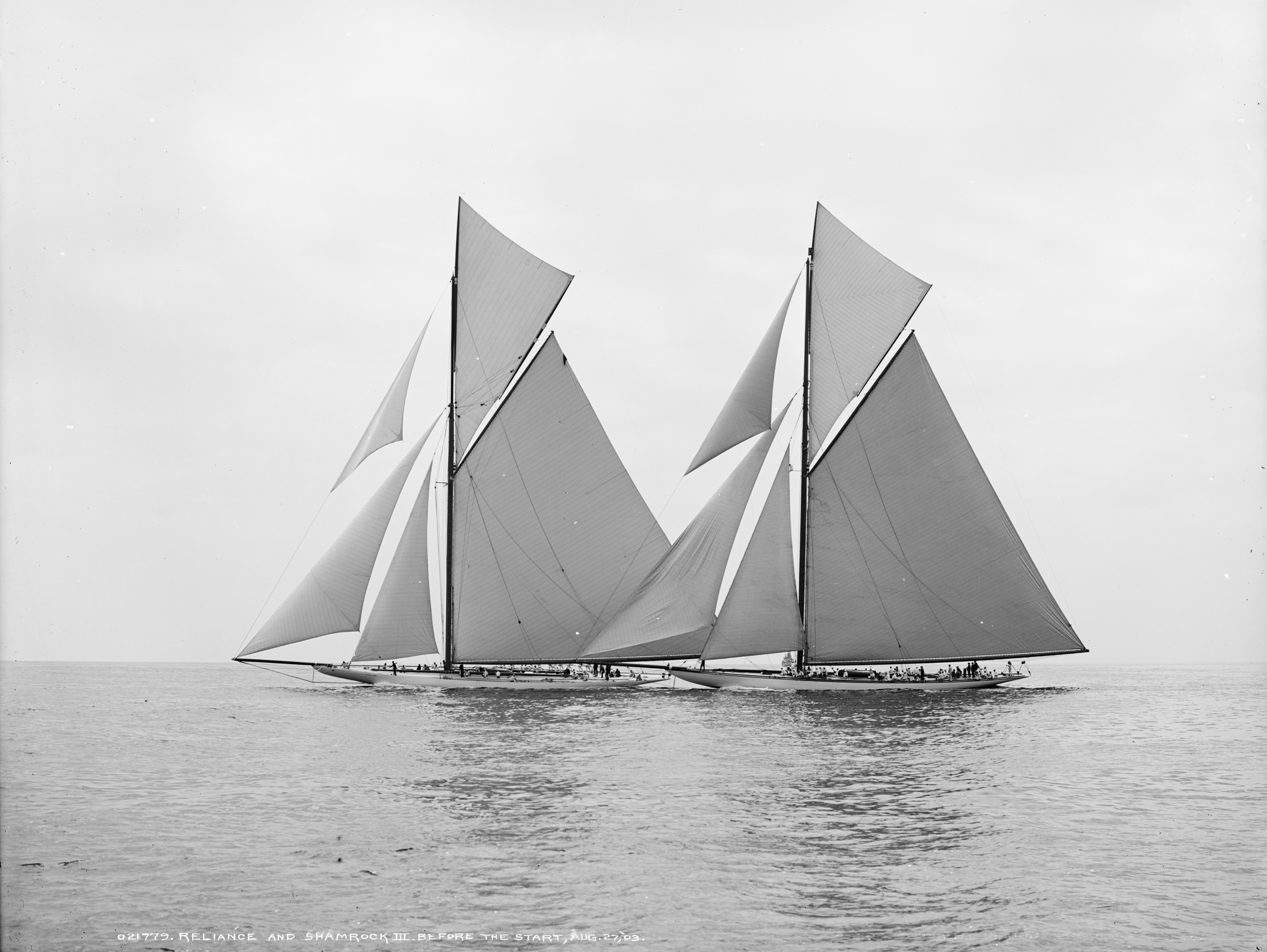
Reliance (Herreshoff) and Shamrock III (Fife) in the 1903 America's Cup races

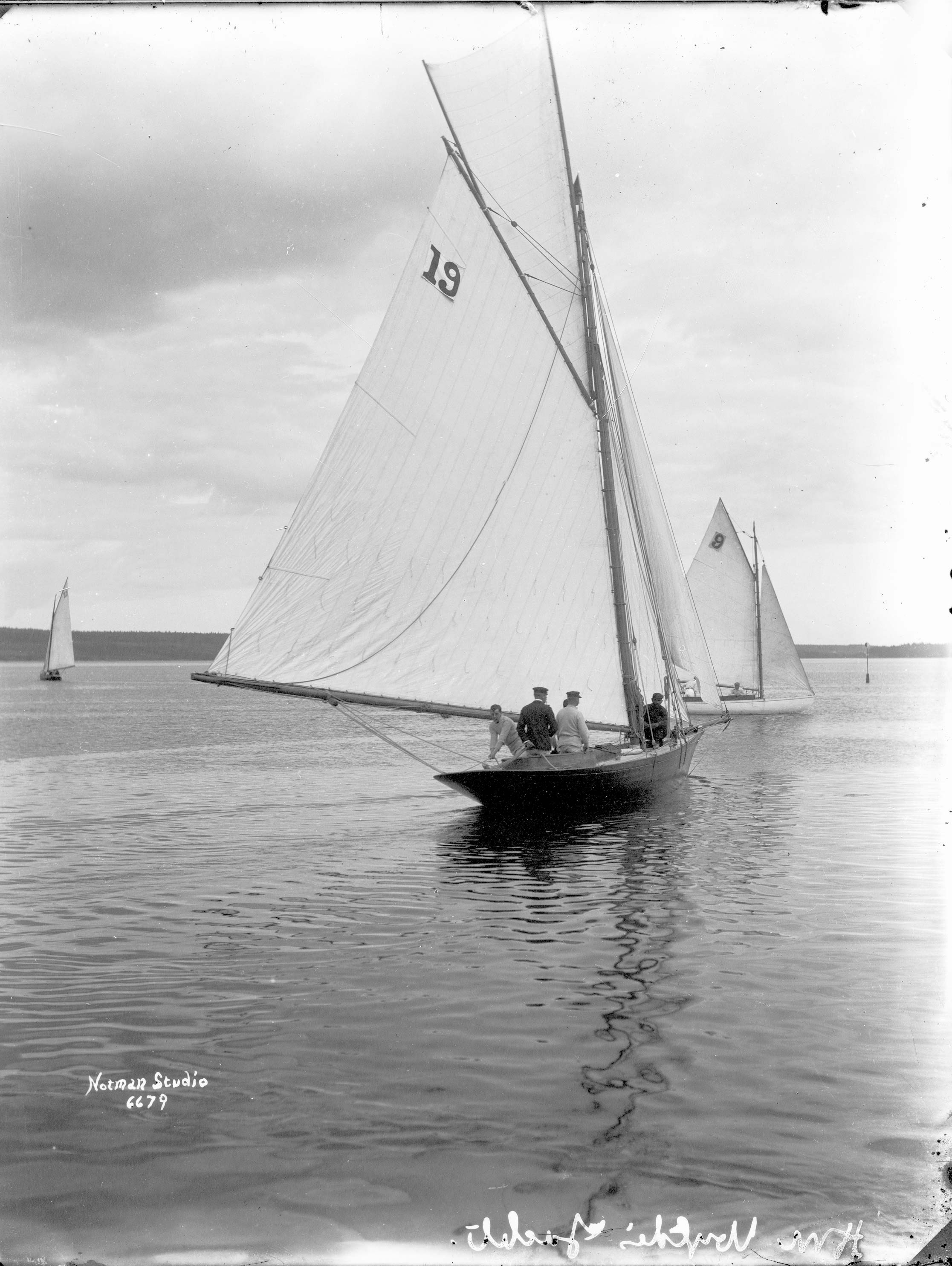
Youla, a 26-foot cutter designed by William Fife, was built by Reuben Harlow in Dartmouth, Nova Scotia, Canada.

William Fife Jr. OBE (15 June 1857 – 11 August 1944), also known as William Fife III, was the third generation of a family of Scottish yacht designers and builders. In his time, William Fife designed around 600 yachts, including two contenders for the America's Cup. The Royal Yachting Association was formed in 1875 to standardise rules, and Fife and his rival G.L. Watson, were instrumental in these rule changes. Around one third of Fife's yachts still exist. His last designs were built in 1938.

== Biography ==
Fife was born in Fairlie, North Ayrshire on the Firth of Clyde. His father William Fife Sr. (1821–1902) and grandfather William Fyfe (1785–1865) had also been designers and boat builders in Fairlie. The family business operated from a shipyard on the beach in the village. Fife began building yachts in 1890 and soon surpassed the achievements of his father and grandfather and became known as one of the premier yacht designers of the day.

As the third generation of a Scottish boat building family, William Fife inherited his family's legacy but sought to establish his own reputation. Fife received commissions from European royalty and from clients as far away as Australia. Following the success of his design Dragon (1888), Fife adopted a stylized Chinese dragon as his trademark. Yachts produced by Fife in Fairlie feature this distinctive scrollwork.

Fife designed two America's Cup yachts for grocery and tea magnate Sir Thomas Lipton who challenged for the cup a total of five times. The Fife-designed challenger Shamrock I (1899) lost to Columbia (Nathanael Greene Herreshoff, 1899) and Shamrock III (1903) lost to Reliance. After the establishment of the first International Rule in 1906, Fife became a prolific designer of metre boats, designing and building several successful 15-Metre and 19-Metre yachts in the years leading up to the Great War. Between 1907 and 1913, William Fife Jr. designed eight of the twenty 15mR yachts ever built, but his first 15mR named Shimna was not built at his famous Fairlie boatyard, but by Alexander Robertson & Sons, because all Fife's principal yacht builders were needed to work on Myles Kennedy's new 23mR, White Heather II.

Fife died on 11 August 1944 at the age of 87 in Fairlie, North Ayrshire. He never married or had children. He was buried in Largs. The yard was continued for some years after his death by his nephew, but never achieved the renown known under Fife's ownership.

In 1951, Fife's sisters arranged for a weather vane to be erected in his memory on the tower of Fairlie parish church. It features a model his 1936 yawl Latifa, which he considered one of his finest designs.

== Quotes ==
French yachtsman Éric Tabarly, two-time winner of the OSTAR and owner of the Fife design Pen Duick wrote:

the great designers of the period were Herreshoff, George Lennox Watson, Charles E. Nicholson and William Fife. Amongst these, Fife has acquired a particular reputation thanks to the sheer artistry and balance of his designs. Furthermore, those of his designs which took shape in his yard were of unmatched construction.

While Fife established a leading reputation on the yacht racing circuit, his work also included a number of fine cruising vessels. Dr. William Collier wrote of Fife's 1920s work:

[Fife] designed and built not only smaller Metre boats but also a series of fine cruisers. This combination typified the inter-war era of the Fairlie yard. Like the schooner Altair (1931), many of the cruisers echo his turn of the century designs such as Cicely (1902) or Susanne (1906); similarly there were few fundamental differences in his ketch designs spanning this era. Perceived by some as anachronistic, these yachts were considered by many to represent some of the greatest refinements of the auxiliary cruising yacht ever achieved.

== Vessels ==
The Fife yard also had a reputation for the extremely high quality of the craftsmanship of the yachts built at the yard. Today, it is thought that there are somewhat less than 100 Fife designs still in existence. Of these, there are around fifty still sailing, most notably:

- cruiser handicap rater Nan (1897)
- 36-rater Pen Duick (formerly Yum, 1898)
- 21-rater Mignon (1898), sisterships Pierette and Yvette (1899)
- cruiser handicap raters Moonbeam III (1903) and Moonbeam IV (1920)
- 15mRs Mariska (1908), Hispania (1909), Tuiga (1909) and The Lady Anne (1912)
- 12mR Cintra (the oldest 12mR in existence, launched 1909)
- 8mR Lucky Girl (launched 1909) and Ierne (launched 1914)
- 19mR Mariquita (1911)
- Ketches Sumurun (1914), Adventuress (1924) and Belle Aventure (1929) on the Eastern Seaboard
- handicap rater Hallowe'en (1926)
- 23mR Cambria (1928)
- gaff-rigged schooner Altair (1931)
- ketch Eilean (1936), which famously featured in the music video for the 1982 Duran Duran song Rio.
- yawl Latifa (1936), one of Fife's favourite designs
- 10.4m canoe stern auxiliary sloop Sumarel (1973)

Fife once said that the secret of a great yacht was that it should be both "fast and bonnie".

== Honours ==
He was appointed an Officer of the Order of the British Empire in the 1919 New Year Honours. In 2004, he was inducted into the America's Cup Hall of Fame.

== Selected historic yachts ==
- Torch (15-ton cutter, William Fife Sr. design, 1864)
- Kilmeney (30-ton cutter, William Fife Sr. design, 1864)
- Fiona (80-ton cutter dubbed the Fawn of Fairlie, William Fife Sr. design, 1865)
- Neptune (50-ton cutter, later a yawl, William Fife Sr. design, 1875)
- Erycina (96-ton cutter, later a yawl, William Fife Sr. design, 1882)
- Ulidia (10-tonner, William Fife Jr. design, 1883)
- Thalia (40-rater, William Fife Jr. design, 1891)
- Calluna (first-class rater, William Fife Jr. design, 1893)

== Yachts for Irish owners ==
- 15 ton cutter Corsair (1860) – designed by William Fife Sr.
- 3 ton lugger Achilla (1889)
- 2 ton lugger Gew Gaw (1891) – built by James E. Doyle Kingston
- 3 ton 1-rater lugger Nansheen (1892) – built by James E. Doyle Kingston
- 5 ton lugger Elva (1894)
- 8 ton 1.5-rater lugger Vill-u-An (1895) – built by Alexander Robertson & Sons
- 6-ton Dublin Bay 25 cutters Darthula, Nepenthe and Whisper (1898–1899) – built by James E. Doyle Kingston
