= Alexander Robertson & Sons =

Former boatyard in Sandbank, Argyll and Bute, Scotland

- New Yard office, circa 1887
- Type: Private
- Founded: 1876
- Founder: Alexander Robertson
- Fate: Ceased operations 1980
- Headquarters: Sandbank, Argyll and Bute, Scotland
- Services: Boat design, building, upgrades and repair. Boat sales and winter storage. Yacht chandlery and full service marine facility.
- Owners: • Alexander Robertson and family (1876–1965) • Auchinleck Investment Company (1965–1980)

Alexander Robertson & Sons was a boatyard in Sandbank, Argyll and Bute, Scotland, from 1876 to 1980. The yard was located on the shore of the Holy Loch, not far from the Royal Clyde Yacht Club (RCYC) at Hunters Quay, in the building that is now the Royal Marine Hotel, which was the epicentre of early Clyde yachting. Alexander Robertson started repairing boats in a small workshop at Sandbank in 1876, and went on to become one of the foremost wooden boatbuilders on Scotland's River Clyde. The "golden years" of Robertson's yard were in the early 1900s, when it started building some of the first IYRU 12mR & 15mR (Metre Class) racing yachts. Robertson's was well known for the quality of its workmanship and was chosen to build the first 15-metre yacht designed by William Fife III (Shimna, 1907). More than 55 boats were built by Robertson's in preparation for the First World War and the yard remained busy even during the Great Depression in the 1930s as many wealthy businessmen developed a passion for yacht racing on the Clyde. During World War II the yard was devoted to Admiralty work, producing a wide range of large high-speed Fairmile Marine Motor Boats. After the war, the yard built the successful one-class Loch Longs and two 12-metre challengers for the America's Cup: Sceptre (1958) and Sovereign (1964). Due to difficult business conditions, the Robertson family sold the yard in 1965, and it was turned over to glass-reinforced plastic production work until it closed in 1980. During its 104-year history, Robertson's Yard built 482 numbered boats, many of which are still sailing today.

== History of Robertson's Yard ==
=== Alexander Robertson (1851–1937) ===
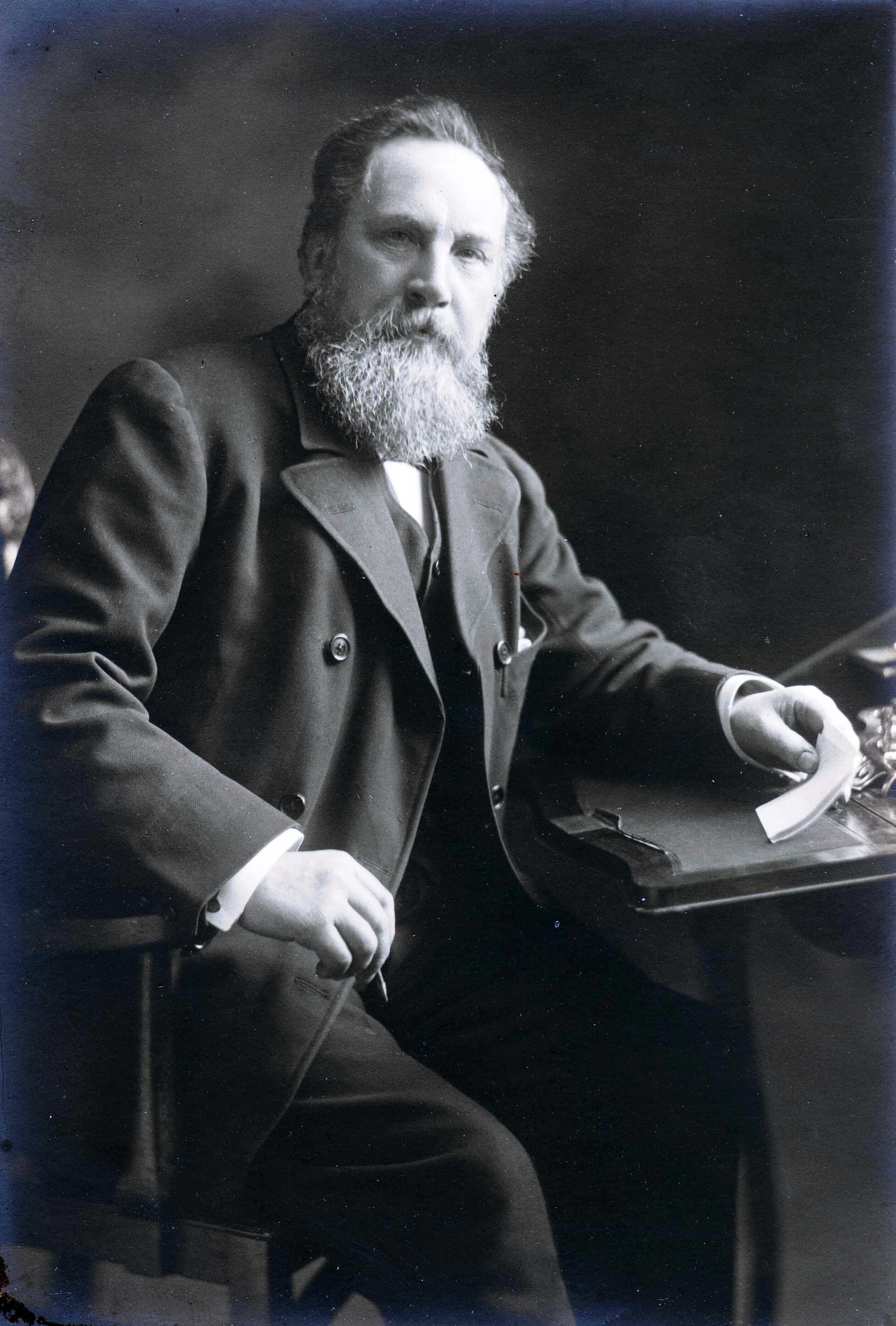
Alexander Robertson, 1851–1937

Tarskavaig, Isle of Skye

In 1876, a 25-year-old Alexander Robertson teamed up with Daniel Kerr to build small boats at his workshop in Sandbank. The partnership was dissolved in 1878, and Robertson went on to acquire larger premises in order to expand the business.

Robertson not only provided a significant source of employment in Sandbank, but he also played an important part in the local community. He made notable contributions in a number of areas, including: Argyll County Councillor, representing Cowal; Parish Councillor; justice of the peace; member of the school board; director of Dunoon District Cottage Hospital; on the board of management of the Parish Church and he was also responsible for organising many social gatherings in the village hall. He also took a very keen interest in yacht racing in the Holy Loch, even in his later years.

=== Golden years ===
Example of the 15 Metre yachts built at the yard - Jeano in 1911 (launched as Tritonia in 1910)

A proper boat-numbering system was introduced at the new 'distillery' site in 1889 and every detail relating to cost was recorded in large ledgers. Boat No 1 was a 25 ft (7.6 m) cutter designed by Robertson for John Dobbie of Dunoon, named Cowal Lass. Boat No 3 was the Fairlie, a 19 ft (5.8 m) cutter designed by William Fife III for A. Currie of Sandbank in 1890. (This was the start of a long relationship with the famous Fife yard at Fairlie, and over the years Robertsons built eleven Fife-designed yachts.) A 26 ft (7.9 m) cutter, Verve, designed by George Lennox Watson in 1892, was the first of many to be built at the yard. The 1894 22 ft (6.7 m) G L Watson designed Gaff cutter Camilla is the oldest known Robertson yacht still sailing, and is based at Rhu. The Alfred Mylne-designed boats did not commence until 1900, with two 24 ft (7.3 m), 19/24 Clyde class sloops, the Valmai and the Susette. The Mylne family owned the 41 ft (12 m) Mylne-Robertson cutter Medea (Ex Vladimir) for over thirty years.

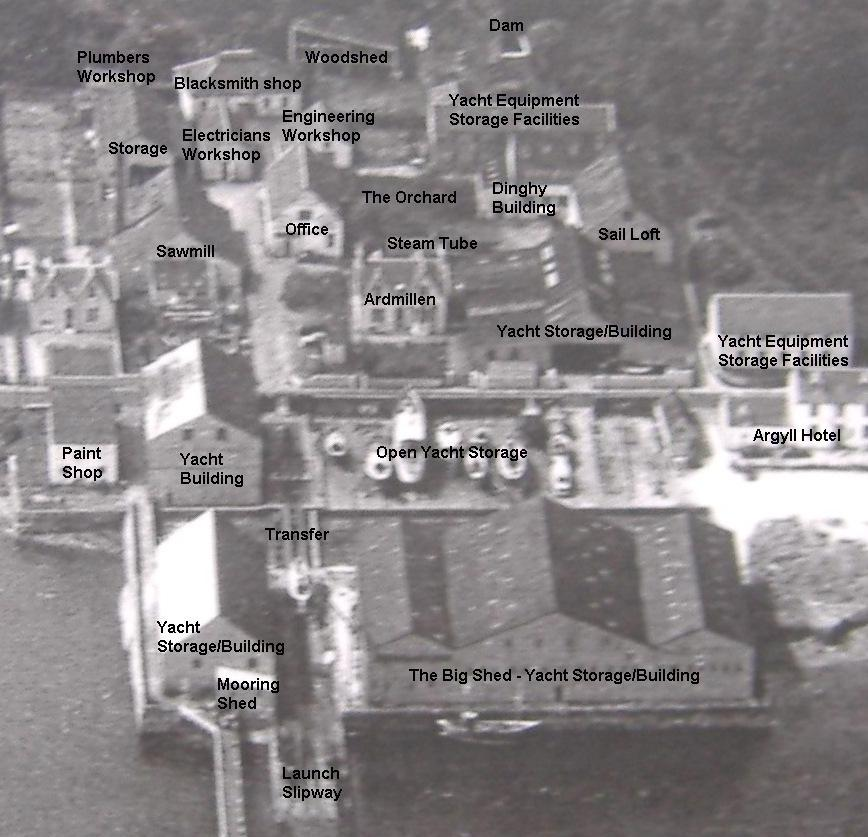
Layout of the boatyard, indicating the function of all buildings.

In April 1893, Robertson leased an acre of land on the "foreshore and seabed" from the Board of Trade for a period of 31 years, with a rent of £2 per annum. Permission included the rights to extend the yard and build a slip, dock and wharf. The new slipway and pier were built in 1893, in time for wintering the boats at the end of the season. With an estimated cost of £4,000 to £5,000, this was one of the most important investments in Clyde yachting. The new slipway allowed boats greater than 25 ft (7.6 m) to be built and launched, and was considered one of the best in the land. It was reported in the New York Times, on 14 December 1895, that "In Robertson's yard, Sandbank, Clyde, about 100 craft have been taken ashore for the Winter...". This confirms the significant growth of the business as a result of the new slipway.

The yard became renowned for its quality tenders which were built for large steamships launched further up the river. It appears that the first such order was for a set of four boats for Mr Ninian B Stewart's new 228 ft (69 m) steel steam screw schooner Maria, designed by G L Watson, and built in 1896. (No Yard Number for boats, no yard reference. Source: Yachtsman magazine, 5 March 1896).

Elrhuna, oldest boat afloat designed and built by Alexander Robertson in 1904, at Largs Marina in 2008

By 1900 most of the infrastructure required for the production of high-calibre wooden boats was in place: pier, slipway, sawmills, workshops, building-sheds, stores, paint shop, engine house, sail loft and workers' houses.

Elrhuna at Glencoe Regatta 2014

Half-hull model of Elrhuna

Elrhuna, a 28 ft (8.5 m) sloop was designed by Alexander in 1904, and due to the quality of the wood and sound construction she still races. Elrhuna (Boat No 35) is the oldest yacht still sailing which was both designed and built by Alexander Robertson. She was referred to as the "Wee Britannia" after the Royal Yacht Britannia, due to her graceful lines and sleek black hull.

The first of many motor boats were built in 1905, among them a luxurious 28 ft (8.5 m) teak-built 'carvel' motor launch ordered for the S Y Nahma, which was the last boat designed by George Lennox Watson. The development of early steam boats by Alexander provided the necessary expertise to build 7 steam-powered launches for the Admiralty in the years leading up to World War I.

When the new 'Metre' class of racing yacht was introduced in 1907, there was fierce competition. Every year vast sums of money were spent by wealthy enthusiasts to have the latest and fastest yacht on the Clyde. These were the golden years of the yard, during which they built some of the earliest metre-class classic racing yachts: 15-metre Shimna (later Slec) (Willian Fife III, 1907); 15-metre Tritonia (later Jeano, Cisne Branco and Albatroz - Alfred Mylne, 1910), 12-metre Heatherbell (Thomas Glen-Coats, 1907) - Heatherbell represented Finland in the 1912 Helsinki Summer Olympics; 12-metre Cyra (Alfred Mylne, 1909) - note : renamed Arcula around 1934 and destroyed by the Wehrmacht in 1943 or 1944, which killed its owner Frits Johannsen (DK); 10-metre Pampero (1912); 8-metre Novena (1908); 5-metre Mungo (1908).

Robertson's Yard was exceptionally busy in 1908. As well as four racing yachts, one large motor launch and several tenders under construction, they had plenty of hollow-spar work and major modifications to the yacht Susanne. The yard employed seventy men and they had to work overtime to keep up with the ambitious building programme. Many alterations were made to the yard and they had a new building shed with 26 ft (7.9 m) headroom and a 4,000 sq ft (370 m^{2}) moulding-loft. The yard was now capable of building yachts of any size, and it was hoped some 23-metre work would follow.

Robertson was a rather astute businessman so, as the yard was booming in the early 1900s, he began buying up properties along the shore of the Holy Loch to stop other boat yards being built.

=== The wars ===
Launch of Sir Arthur Rose, 1938

Over 55 boats were built by Robertson's in preparation for the First World War, and after the war the yard started to diversify and fit-out larger yachts. The company had been run by Robertson for many years, but now three of his sons were helping to run the family business. In 1922 Robertson decided to re-structure the organisation so it could be operated without him in the future. Alexander Robertson & Sons (Yachtbuilders) Limited was formally established on 5 August 1922 to "carry out all aspects of designing, building and repair of yachts, sale of yachts and sail making". Four of Robertson's sons helped to run the business in later years: Archibald, Alexander (Alec), Donald and George. A fifth son, James, trained as a naval architect and worked for Lloyd's Register of Shipping, making a significant contribution to the restoration of the famous tea clipper Cutty Sark, which is on display in London.

Example of a high quality tender, for SY Sappho

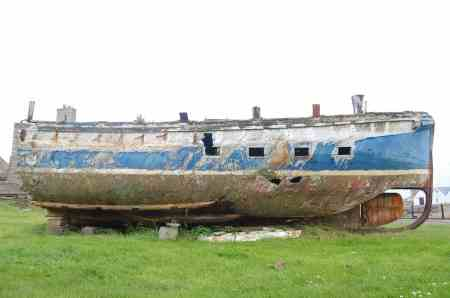
Hulk of Charlotte Elizabeth, Watson-Class lifeboat, at Thurso Harbour

Robertson's Yard was now looking for a new designer and by the end of 1929 David Boyd had replied to an advertisement in the Glasgow Herald. In 1937 he designed the sleek 6-metre racing yacht Circe, which was described by many as the most successful racing yacht ever produced by the yard. J. Herbert Thom, one of the Clyde's best helmsmen sailed the yacht with tremendous success in America in 1938 and brought back the 'Seawanhaka Cup', which was successfully defended in home waters the following year. Circe was transferred to the Spartak Yacht Club in Tallinn and represented Russia in the 1952 Helsinki Summer Olympics.

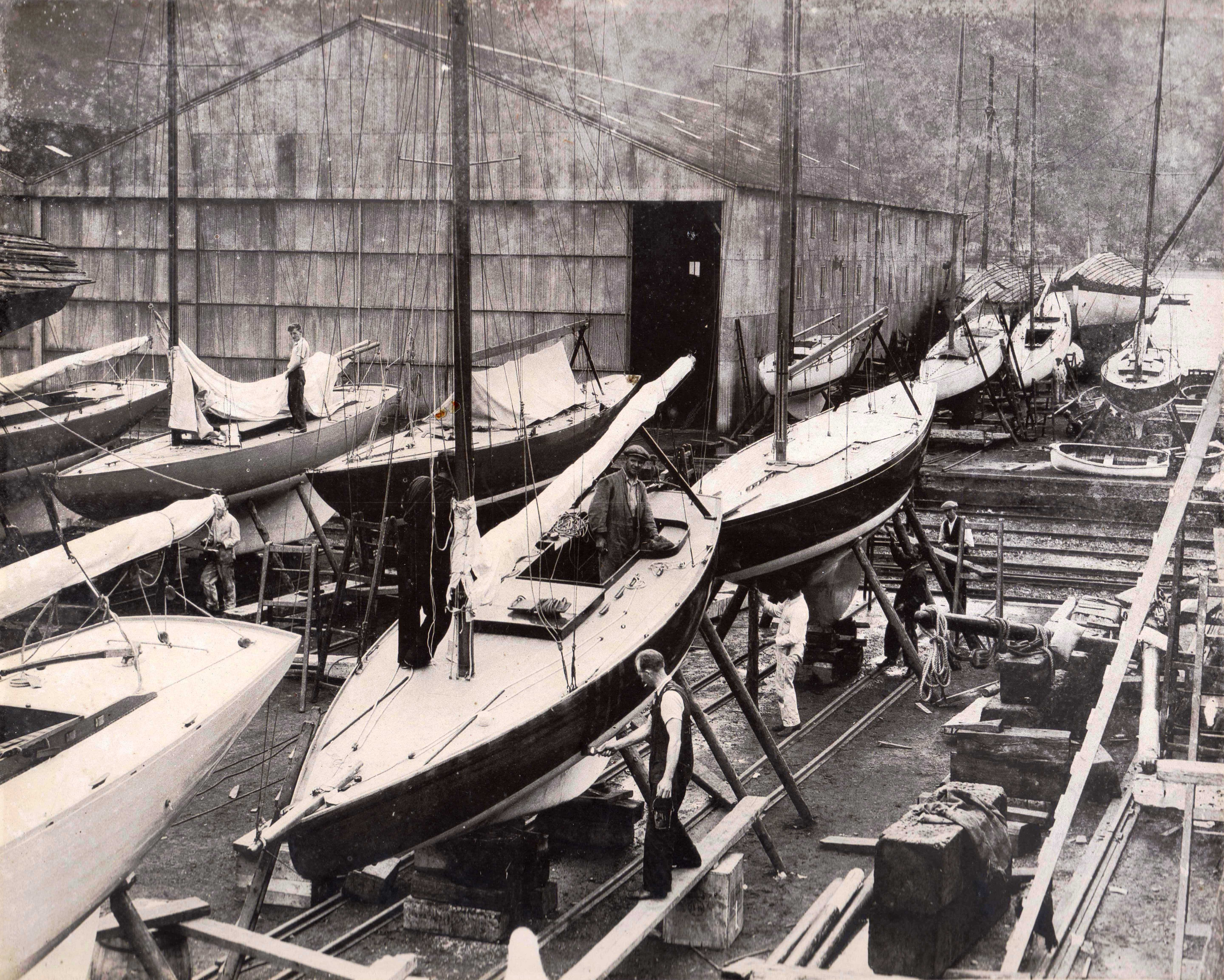
Preparing for Clyde Fortnight Regatta 1936: 'Sunbeam' 19/24 Class centre; 6-metres to rear; Island Class to left

Archibald Robertson was the senior director in the company and destined to take over operation of the yard before he died in November 1929. Alexander remained chairman of the company until June 1935, when he was 84. Even after that he maintained a keen interest in the operation and was often first at the yard in the morning to see the men get started. He died on 15 February 1937 at the family home, 'Tarskavaig', named after the small crofting village on the Isle of Skye.

MTB 718 (Lone Wolf), Fairmile 'D' modified for Special Operations in Norway, launched in 1944. Courtesy http://www.mtb718.co.uk

The first order for a lifeboat from the Royal National Lifeboat Institution (RNLI) was secured by the yard in 1935. The Charlotte Elizabeth was the first motor-powered lifeboat launched in Scotland, and was later stationed at Islay Lifeboat Station in Port Askaig: she now lies abandoned by Thurso Harbour in Caithness (correct as of 13 Jun 2009).

The Sir Arthur Rose was proudly displayed in the RNLI pavilion at the 1938 Empire Exhibition in Bellahouston Park, Glasgow between May and October. The lifeboat was officially named by Mrs F.O. Laing, daughter of Sir Arthur, on 11 August 1939 and sailed to the Isle of Iona for blessing on the same day. Orders for a total of 11 lifeboats were received, several of which came back for regular servicing.

During the 1930s many gigs (or tenders) were built for larger boats launched further up the Clyde, among them the SY Nahlin. A luxury 30 ft (9.1 m) motor launch was built for the owner of the SY Nahlin, along with a motor tender for the crew, two lifeboats and two dinghies. During the renovation of the S Y Nahlin, by the new owner Sir James Dyson, a new owner's launch was built from the original plans in 2009, and the crew's launch was rebuilt in 2008 by Henwood & Dean of Henley-on-Thames.

Several larger boats were also built during this impressive pre-war period: Caretta, 67 ft (20 m) twin screw motor launch designed by Messrs G L Watson in 1927; Ron, 50 ft (15 m) ketch designed by J A McCallum in 1928; Southern Cross, 51 ft (16 m) ketch designed by G L Watson in 1930; Zigeuner, 60 ft (18 m) yawl designed by David Boyd in 1935.

The specially fitted-out 'oceangoing' cruiser Southern Cross left Robertson's Yard on 26 October 1930 and set sail on a 3-year round-the-world trip, arriving at Brisbane in October 1931. On the return leg her owner, the tobacco heir D Guthrie Dunn who was a member of the RCYC, was lost overboard near St Helena. The yacht was brought back to Robertson's Yard by a new crew on 8 July 1933, where she was refitted and sold on. D Guthrie Dunn's cousin Miss E Mathieson donated a silver model of Southern Cross to the Ayr Yacht Club around 1965 which was used as a trophy for the famous Ailsa Craig offshore yacht race. This sturdy cruiser is still sailing in the Mediterranean and based near Barcelona.

Southern Cross Trophy, presented to Ayr Yacht Club 1965

Southern Cross at Soller, Majorca 2013

During the Second World War the yard was devoted to Admiralty work. A total of 23 fast Fairmile Marine motor boats were launched during the war: Fairmile A motor launch, 100 ft (30 m) triple screw (1); Fairmile B motor launch, 112 ft (34 m) twin screw (7); Fairmile C motor gun boat, 110 ft (34 m) triple screw (3); Fairmile D motor torpedo boat, 115 ft (35 m) quadruple screw (12). Some of the boats returned for servicing during the war, and many others were repaired or modified for the Admiralty.

A number of Robertson-built Fairmile boats had distinguished war records: ML-160 was lead vessel in the starboard column during Operation Chariot, the St Nazaire Raid on the heavily defended German dry dock and naval base in March 1942; many of the boats took part in Operation Overlord, the invasion of Normandy; and several of these high speed launches were engaged in top secret operations in the Mediterranean. MTB 625 and MTB 653 were built for the Royal Norwegian Navy and famously took part in the secretive 30th MTB Flotilla operations out of Lerwick. MTB 718 was launched at the yard in 1944 as part of the secretive 15th Motor Gun Boat Flotilla operating out of Dartmouth and carried out clandestine operations in France and Norway towards the end of the war. The crew named their boat Lone Wolf because most of her top secret operations were carried out independently.

Sailing in the Clyde area was restricted during the war, although the Holy Loch appears to have been an unrestricted area in March 1940. The Clyde racing fleet did not make its official appearance after the war until 25 May 1946. Due to the shortage of materials the cost of building a new yacht had increased by 50% between 1939 and 1945.

=== Winds of change ===
Boatbuilding and yachting in particular changed direction dramatically after the war. Larger boats with crews all but disappeared and they were gradually replaced by more economical cruising and racing yachts. The 'one-off' design/building work that the yard specialised in was replaced by 'one-design' yachts, which began with Uffa Fox's Flying Fifteens in 1948 and the successful Loch Longs in 1949.

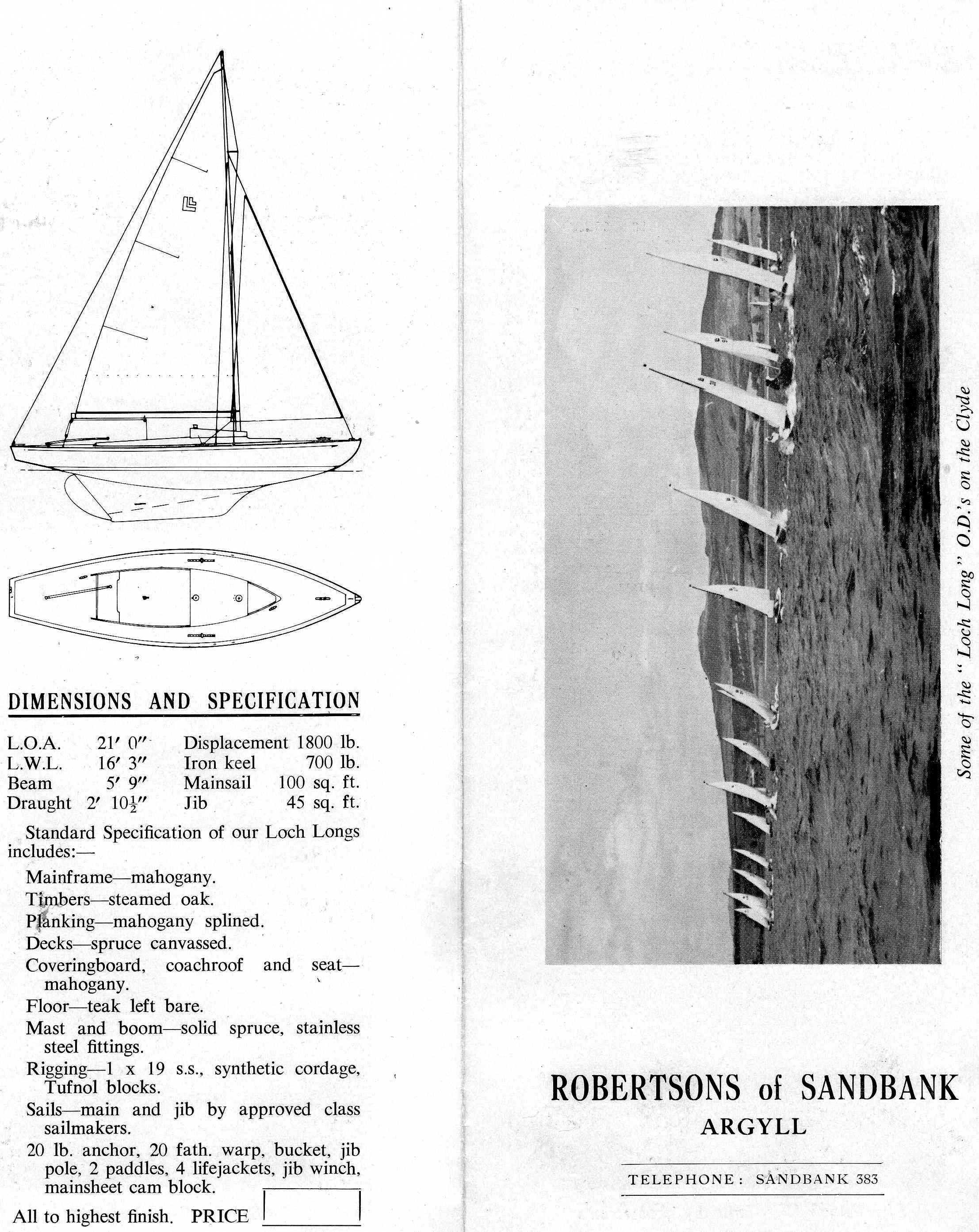
Yard brochure for the successful Loch Longs

Aerial View of Robertson's Yard ~1960

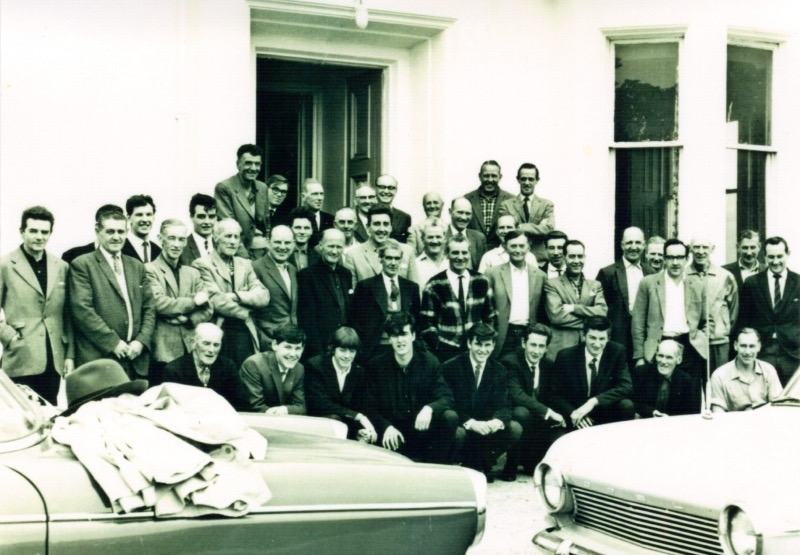
A gathering of Robertson staff, circa 1970

In September 1956 a Royal Yacht Squadron syndicate was formed to build a 12-metre for the 1958 America's Cup. The challenger was selected based on model tank testing and David Boyd's second design was chosen. In October 1957 Sceptre was beginning to take shape at Robertson's yard in Sandbank. She was officially launched on 2 April 1958. Some initial testing took place in the Holy Loch, but more extensive trials were carried out in the Solent before she was shipped to America. The Sceptre lost to the New York Yacht Club yacht Columbia in September 1958.

The luxuriously appointed 65 ft (20 m) Lone Fox was built in early 1957, in the same shed as Sceptre, and was Colonel W. H. (Bill) Whitbread's personal yacht for a quarter of a century. Colonel Whitbread was head of the well-known brewery firm, and sponsor of the famous round-the-world race. She later won many races in California, and competed regularly in the Caribbean Classic yacht races. Lone Fox took top honours in the 2011 Antigua Classic Regatta winning; class, fleet, and fastest overall boat. Duran Duran presented the Panerai Trophy to Lone Fox for fastest time in the 2012 Antigua Classic Sailing Regatta.

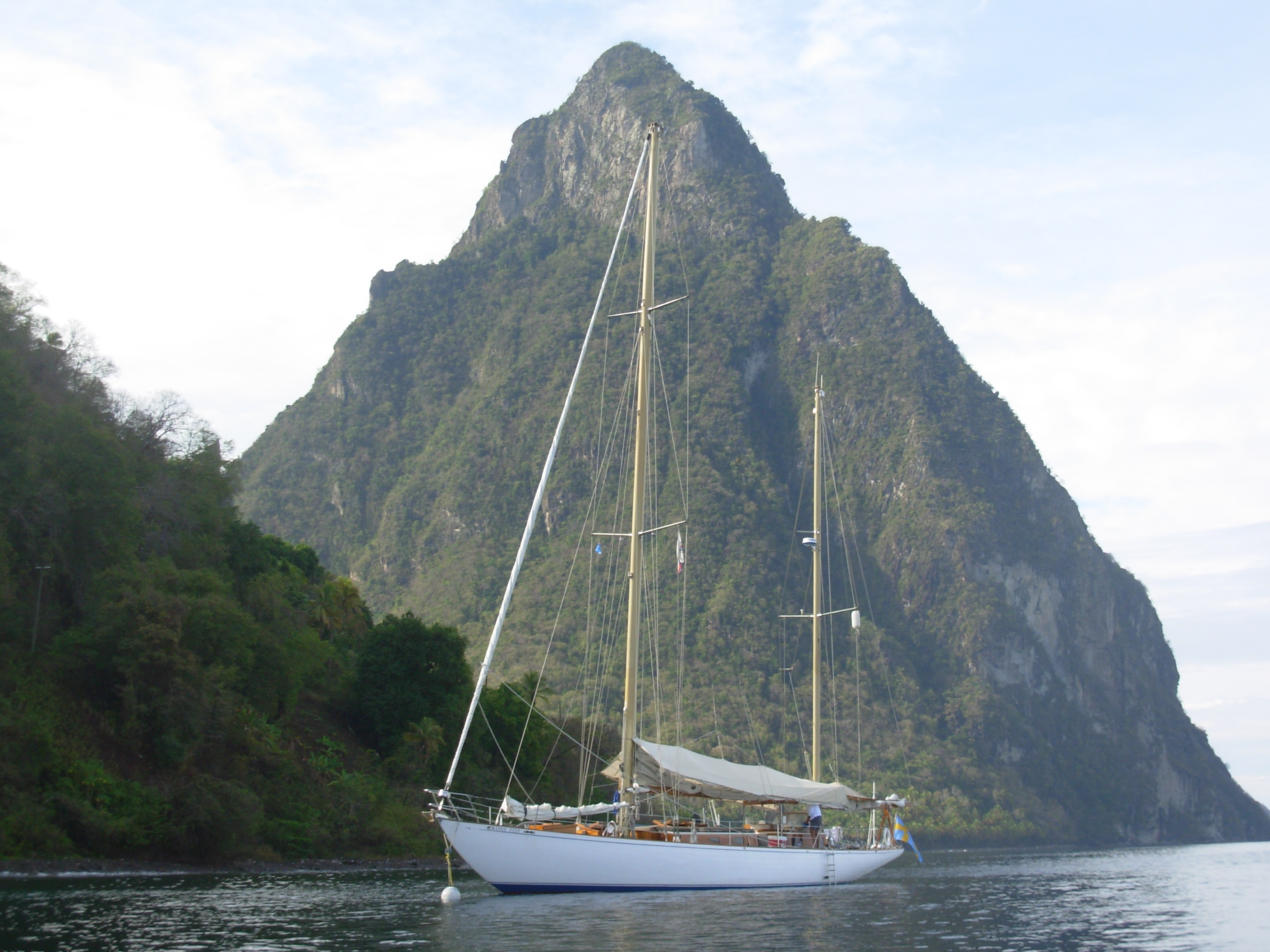
Lone Fox in St Lucia, 2007

During the late 1950s major business problems started to appear, and during a slow period the yard found work building fast launches for the RAF. They undertook fixed-price contracts for two 63-foot General Service Mk 1 Pinnaces, but delays, design changes and escalating cost of materials put the yard in financial difficulties. At the AGM held on 4 June 1963, discussion took place regarding the adverse outcomes of these contracts, and it was agreed efforts should be made to sell the yard.

Shortly before Sovereign was laid down, Robertson & Sons produced one of the finest Loch Long One Design Class yachts, Ariel, Boat No 316, sail number 87. Which was referred to in the Glasgow Herald in 1993.

David Boyd was again chosen to design a new 12-metre challenger for the 1964 Americas Cup. The Sovereign was launched on 6 June 1963, but by August the Royal Thames Yacht Club Committee was anxious about her performance and David Boyd was asked to design another boat similar to Sovereign, which was named Kurrewa V. Before the two yachts left British waters they conducted trial races in May/June 1964 and the Sovereign was officially selected as the challenger. Although the New York Yacht Club yacht Constellation won the America's Cup off Newport, Rhode Island, Sovereign was much admired for her graceful lines and teak deck.

The first modern 12-Metre yacht 'Sceptre', built for the America's Cup in 1958. Designer David Boyd in the foreground with his craftsmen

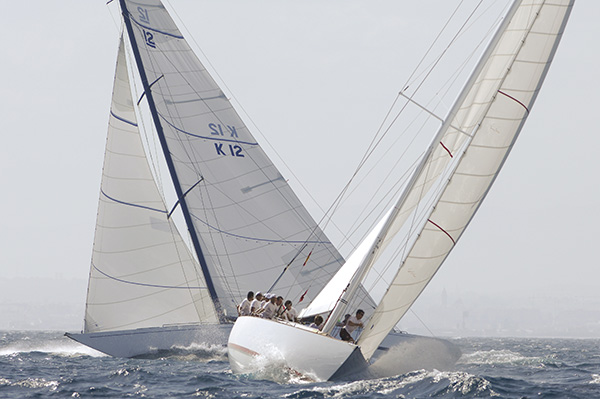
Sovereign (background) and Ikra (ex Kurrewa V), Valencia Regatta 2007. Courtesy Chris Cameron Photography.

In addition to the financial losses building the two RAF Pinnaces, the much anticipated work following the three high-profile 12-metre projects failed to materialize. The Robertson family finally sold the yard in 1965 for £27,750, and it became a subsidiary of the Auchinleck Investment Co of Glasgow (comprising a syndicate of 5 well-known Clyde yachtsmen), essentially ending wooden boatbuilding there.

=== GRP production ===
The prototype for the new fibreglass Piper Class yacht, Sandpiper, was built in wood at the beginning of 1966 and competed in the famous Clyde Week regatta that summer.

The yard continued to operate for a further 14 years assembling a wide range of GRP (fibreglass) boats such as Pipers, Ohlsons, Etchells and Pilot Launches. Dennis Healey's ill-conceived increase in VAT from 8% to 25% on luxury goods in 1974 had a disastrous effect on yachting. Even though this punitive tax was reduced to 12.5% in 1976 the damage was irreparable and many small boatyards went out of business. The rising cost of oil and resin along with strong competition from the more established GRP yards down south finally brought boatbuilding to a close in 1980. Buildings in the lower yard were finally pulled down in the late 1980s, and the site was levelled for re-development. All that was left of the original yard was the slipway and the boats that were once launched from it. Houses have now been built in the upper yard, and the lower yard site became incorporated in the new Holy Loch Marina development during 2009.

== Tables - boats and designers ==
A total of 482 numbered boats (1889-1980) were built at the yard, according to the yard build-book. However, in addition, around 200 smaller boats (mostly under 15 ft) were also built: fishing skiffs; rowing boats; sailing dinghies; tenders (gigs); sailing lifeboats; motorised lifeboats.

=== Classic wooden boats ===
A wide range of Classic Wooden Boats were built at Robertson's Yard.

Class of Wooden Boat	Number	Key names and dates
15 Metre	2	Shimna (1907), Tritonia ( later Jeano, Cisne Branco and Albatroz) 1910
12-Metre (Classic)	2	Heatherbell (1907), Cyra (1909)
12-Metre (Modern)	3	Sceptre (1958), Sovereign (1963), Kurrewa V (later Ikra) 1963
10-Metre	1	Pampero (1912)
8-Metre	4	Novena (1908), Decima (1910), Sunburst (1967)
6-Metre	5	Maid Marion (1921), Circe (1937), Marletta (1947), Marylette (1953)
5.5-Metre	2	Maryllis (1951), Yolaine (1953)
5-Metre	1	Mungo (1908)
Belfast Lough, Utah 18 ft (5.5 m)	4	n/a (1891)
23/30 Clyde Class	2	Lottie (1898), Hawk (1898)
19/24 Clyde Class	5	Valmai (1900), Valtos (1903), Sunbeam II (1904)
30 ft (9.1 m) Clyde Class	3	Vladimir (later Medea) 1904, Sunbeam (1908), Corrie (1908)
Holy Loch Redwing	4	n/a (1903)
7 Lengths Cutter (Germany)	1	Scottie (1906)
Dragon	5	Argee (1937), Arabis (1937), Primula (1937)
Flying Fifteen	4	Malise (1948), Sprite (1948), Cirrus (1949)
Loch Long	27	Blaithe (1949), Akela (1951), Ariel no. 87 (1962), Rebel (1966)
Piper	1	Sandpiper (1966), original hull design for the GRPs
Watson-class lifeboat (RNLI)	9	Charlotte Elizabeth (1934), W M Tilson (1949)
32' Surf-class lifeboat (RNLI)	2	Norman Nasmyth (1938), John Ryburn (1938)
Fairmile A motor launch	1	110 ft (34 m) Triple Screw Motor Launch, ML 106 (1939)
Fairmile B motor launch	7	112 ft (34 m) Twin Screw Motor Launch, ML 119, 136, 160, 197, 223, 238, 454 (1940–45)
Fairmile C motor gun boat	3	110 ft (34 m) Triple Screw Motor Gun Boat, MGB 315, 317, 320 (1941)
Fairmile D motor torpedo boat	12	115 ft (35 m) Quadruple Screw, Motor Gun Boat & Motor Torpedo Boat variants: MGBs 625, 630, 637, 661; MTBs 653, 675, 691, 718, 731, 758, 793, 5018 (1942–45)
Admiralty Launches (other)	65	50 ft (15 m) Steam Pinnace (1912), Patrol launch (1957)
RAF Mark 1 Pinnace	2	RAF 1380 (1956), RAF 1382 (1958)
RAF (other)	6	Motor launches (1957)

In addition to the series of Classic Boats above, there were many 'one-off' Classic Boats which were built at Robertson's Yard.

Classic (One-Offs)	Type of Wooden Boat	Designer	Year
Fairlie	19 ft (5.8 m) Cutter	William Fife III	1890
Camilla	22 ft (6.7 m) Gaff Cutter	G L Watson	1894
Vill-u-an	32 ft (9.8 m) Lugger	William Fife III	1895
Ernani	59 ft (18 m) Wooden Screw Schooner	Alexander Robertson	1898
Verve II	53 ft (16 m) Cutter	G L Watson	1899
Clodagh	46 ft (14 m) Cutter	G L Watson	1901
Elrhuna	28 ft (8.5 m) Sloop	Alexander Robertson	1904
Galma	60 ft (18 m) Twin Screw Motor Launch	Alfred Mylne	1908
HMAS Australia	50 ft (15 m) Steam Launch	Admiralty	1909
Aroha (Adana)	65.2 ft (19.9 m) Twin Screw Ketch	J A McCallum	1914
Adara	63 ft (19 m) Twin Screw Motor Launch	J A McCallum	1920
La Falaise	55 ft (17 m) Twin Screw Motor Launch	G L Watson & Co	1923
Ariadne	69 ft (21 m) Motor Launch, ketch rigged	Alfred Mylne	1925
Caretta	67 ft (20 m) Twin Screw Motor Launch	G L Watson & Co	1927
Ron	50 ft (15 m) Ketch, gaff rigged	J A McCallum	1928
Pretty Polly	67 ft (20 m) Auxiliary Cutter	G L Watson & Co	1929
Southern Cross	51 ft (16 m) Twin Screw Auxiliary Ketch	G L Watson & Co	1930
Zigeuner	61 ft (19 m) Auxiliary Bermudan Yawl	David Boyd	1935
Taiseer V (Skye)	38 ft (12 m) Auxiliary Sloop	C A Nicholson	1953
Lone Fox	64 ft (20 m) Ketch	Robert Clark Ltd	1957
Greylag	38 ft (12 m) Auxiliary Bermudan Sloop	David Boyd	1962
Sandpiper	24.5 ft (7.5 m) Day Boat (prototype of Pipers)	David Boyd	1966

=== Designers (wooden boats) ===
Robertson's Yard built boats were designed by many famous naval architects throughout its history, among them, David Boyd who joined the yard in 1929.

Robertson's Yard - Designers	Wooden Boats Only
George Lennox Watson, & Co (1892–1950)	38
Alfred Mylne (1900–1925)	27
James Croll – 'Loch Longs' (1949-1966)	27
Noel Macklin – 'Fairmile' MTB's (1939–1945)	23
Alexander Robertson (1876–1907)	17
David Boyd (1933–1967)	16
William Fife III (1890–1921)	11
John A McCallum (1914–1928)	7
Johan Anker - 'Dragons' (1937–1952)	5
Uffa Fox - 'Flying Fifteens' (1948–1949)	4
Thomas C Glenn Coates (1907)	1
C A Nicholson (1953)	1
Robert Clark (1957)	1

Note - The above counts for Alexander Robertson and David Boyd are probably understated - some of their boat designs were attributed to 'the builder', by Lloyd's Register.

=== GRP boats ===
The table provides a summary of the main classes of GRP boats fitted-out (hull purchased elsewhere), or built at the yard.

Class of GRP Boat	Number	Some Key Names and Dates
Piper	57	Stormpiper fitted-out (1967), Hee Hoo (1977)
Etchell 22	49	Pinocchio (1975), Mistress (1978), Playgirl II (1980)
Ohlson 38	5	Gale fitted-out (1969), L'Exocet fitted-out (1972), Eorsa fitted-out (1973)
Ohlson 35	1	Nyvaig fitted-out (1973)
Comfort 30	8	Casual Comfort (1976), Alicante (1979)
Bolero 25	11	Bolero 1 (1979), Bolero 11 hull-only (1980)
Bolero 35	4	Hulls only (1980)
Launches (65–35 ft)	16	Norskerry fitted-out (1969), Kempock Clyde Pilot (1978)

== Classic wooden Robertson boats still sailing. ==
This section has been included to provide an up to date list of all wooden boats that are still sailing or undergoing/awaiting restoration.

Name	Key	Built	Type of Boat, Information and Location
Camilla	c	1894	22 ft (6.7 m) Gaff cutter, designed by G L Watson, Boat No 13. Took part in the 2013 Clyde Classic Regatta in June. Currently based at Rhu.
Clodagh	c	1901	46.2 ft (14.1 m) Cutter, designed by A Mylne, Boat No 25. First class 8-berth cruiser. Awaiting major restoration in Fowey.
Jura (Yo-San)	c	1903	29 ft (8.8 m) Sloop designed by Alexander Robertson, Boat No 27. Undergoing major renovation near Kirkcudbright in November 2017.
Elrhuna	r	1904	28 ft (8.5 m) Sloop designed by Alexander Robertson, Boat No 35. Restoration project undertaken in 2015/16. After 30 years sailing from the Glencoe Boat Club moved to Falmouth late 2017.
Scottie	r	1906	35 ft (11 m) Sloop designed by A Mylne. Raced at the Havel Klassik regatta in Berlin, as Illusion, in June 2005. Based at Berlin Yacht Club in 2018.
Corrie	r	1908	44 ft (13 m) Sloop designed by William Fife III. Based at Hamble and still racing on the Solent in 2017. On the National Register of Historic Vessels.
Grace	c	1909	28 ft (8.5 m) Sloop. After renovation in Northern Italy, sold and shipped to Santander in Northern Spain in 2017.
Sandora	m	1916	35 ft (11 m) ex Admiralty Motor Launch (No 750). Based in Uxbridge 2009.
Melisande (tender)	o	1919	21 ft (6.4 m) Whaler built for the survey ship Melisande, which was commissioned in 1918. Based in Solway Firth 2018.
Adara	m	1920	63.4 ft (19.3 m) Twin Screw Motor Launch designed by J A McCallum. Awaiting restoration in Italy.
La Falaise	m	1923	55 ft (17 m) Twin Screw Motor Launch. Was converted as a luxury gourmet cruising vessel to sail on the canals of Southern France. She was up for sale on the River Thames in August 2023.
Alice	m	1924	20 ft (6.1 m) Tender for the Lulworth, which was restored 2002.
Ron (of Argyll)	c	1928	50 ft (15 m) Gaff Rigged Ketch designed by J A McCallum. Based in Western Australia during 2017.
Pretty Polly (later Juliette)	c	1929	67 ft (20 m) Cutter designed by G L Watson. Following renovation based in Palermo, Sicily in 2018. For sale in Palermo, June 2025.
Southern Cross	c	1930	51 ft (16 m) Twin screw Auxiliary Ketch designed by G L Watson for David Guthrie Dunn to circumnavigate the globe. Based near Barcelona in June 2022.
S Y Nahlin	m	1930	20 ft (6.1 m) S Y Nahlin currently owned by Sir James Dyson. Crew's motor boat tender, re-built 2008.
Morven	c	1934	23 ft (7.0 m) Auxiliary Sloop designed by G L Watson & Co. Currently based at Crinan, Scotland.
Zigeuner	c	1935	60 ft (18 m) Bermudan Yawl designed by David Boyd. Based at the Fremantle Sailing Club, Western Australia in late 2017.
Canadian Pacific	m	1938	46 ft (14 m) Watson Lifeboat. Based in Dornie, Kyle of Lochalsh.
City of Edinburgh	m	1938	46 ft (14 m) Watson Lifeboat. Seen in Buckie harbour 2005.
Sir Arthur Rose	m	1938	46 ft (14 m) Watson Lifeboat. Renamed Rose Marion, now based at Robertson's boatyard, Limekiln Quay, Woodbridge.
Julia Park Barry of Glasgow	m	1938	46 ft (14 m) Watson Lifeboat. Taken to Peterhead Prison Museum in 2015 and was awaiting restoration in Jan 2018.
The Good Hope	c	1938	46 ft (14 m) Watson Lifeboat. Converted to gaff rig. Based in South Wales.
Marletta	r	1947	6-Metre designed by David Boyd. Undergoing restoration in Cornwall, 2020.
Thistle	r	1947	6-Metre designed by David Boyd. Based at Hamble. Raced in the Metre Centenary Regatta Cowes 2007.
Loch Long (s)	r	1949	A total of 27 Loch Longs (21 ft) were built by Robertsons between 1949 and 1966, over 20 of which are still racing.
Sarah Tilson	m	1950	46 ft (14 m) Watson Lifeboat. At Medway Bridge, Rochester, undergoing restoration.
Duckling	c	1950	32.7 ft (10.0 m) Auxiliary Sloop designed by David Boyd. Based at Port Bannantyne in early 2018.
Taiseer V (Skye)	c	1953	39 ft (12 m) Auxiliary Sloop designed by C A Nicholson. Now located in France, Brittany (June 2012), renamed Skye and undergoing a major refit in 2018.
Lone Fox	c	1957	64 ft (20 m) Ketch designed by R Clark for Colonel Whitbread. Located on the Maine coast USA and undergoing deck repairs, August 2023. In the 2024 she is due to return to charter work in St Thomas, US Virgin Islands.
Sceptre	r	1958	12-Metre David Boyd design. Owned by the Sceptre Preservation Society, and still racing.
Greylag	c	1962	38 ft (12 m) Auxiliary Bermudan Sloop designed by David Boyd for Colonel Whitbread (wee sister of Lone Fox). Fully restored and for sale October 2014.
Sovereign	r	1963	12-Metre David Boyd design. Based at the Yacht Club de Cannes, still racing.
Kurrewa V (later Ikra)	r	1963	12-Metre David Boyd design. Based at the Yacht Club de San Tropez, still racing.
Sandpiper	r	1966	The original wooden Piper. Up for sale, Norfolk 2016.
Sunburst	r,c	1967	8-Metre David Boyd design. Last wooden yacht built at Robertson's Yard. Raced at Cowes 2007.

Key : c = cruising yacht, r = racing yacht, m = motor boat, o = other

== Robertson's Yard time line - key events ==
The table provides a time line for key events in the history of the yard.

Year	Key Events
1851	Alexander Robertson born in Inverkip.
1858	The family moves to set up a new post office in Sandbank (operational 1860).
1875	Alexander's father, who was born at Tarskavaig on the Isle of Skye, dies.
1876	'Robertson & Kerr Boat Builders & Carpenters' partnership formed. Small boats were repaired and built beside the new post office.
1878	Partnership dissolved, but Alexander continued on his own.
1879	Alexander bought the larger 'Distillery Site', which had more space to build larger boats, and had good access to the sea.
1887	Initial development phase of the new yard site completed. The business was expanding, with 47 boats based (wintered) at the yard.
1889	Proper boat numbering system started (No 1 Cowal Lass).
1893	The new slipway was completed late in the year. The first large boat (greater than 25 ft (7.6 m) ) was launched in 1895; Valda a 44 ft (13 m) cutter.
1896	The yard started building high-spec tenders for the owners of luxurious steamships which were launched further up the River Clyde.
1898	First large steam-powered boat, the 59 ft (18 m) wooden screw-driven schooner, Ernani.
1901	Alexander starts buying shore property in Sandbank to stop other boat yards being built.
1905	Luxurious motor boat tender built for the (SY Nahma), which was the last boat designed by G L Watson.
1906	Start of exports. Scottie, a special 35 ft (11 m) Mylne designed yacht was exported to Germany to race in the Baltic.
1907	Alexander bought a considerable portion of ground on the Kilmun shore, across the Holy Loch, to stop other boat yards being built.
1907	Start of the big classic racing yachts, first 15-Metre designed by W Fife III (Shimna).
1907	One of the first 12-Metres in UK to be classed under 'First International Rules' (Heatherbell).
1911	First naval order, from John Brown & Co, a tender for HMAS Australia.
1922	Alexander Robertson & Sons (Yachtbuilders) Ltd Sandbank, formally structured.
1929	Designer David Boyd left Fife's of Fairlie to begin work at the yard.
1934	Start of lifeboats for the RNLI (Charlotte Elizabeth).
1937	Death of Alexander Robertson, age 86.
1939	Beginning of the fast Fairmile ML/MGB/MTBs for World War II.
1949	First of one-design Loch Longs (Thistle) built at the yard.
1957	Colonel Whitbread's Lone Fox launched 10 July 1957.
1958	Earliest of the modern 12-Metre racing yachts (Sceptre).
1963	Last of the big wooden yachts 12-Metre (Kurrewa V).
1965	Robertson family sold the business.
1966	Sandpiper designed by David Boyd, wooden prototype for the GRP Pipers.
1967	Last wooden boat built at the yard, D Boyd designed 8-Metre (Sunburst).
1967	First GRP Piper fitted-out (Stormpiper).
1973	GRP shed operational.
1974	VAT on boats increased from 8% to 25%.
1974	Earliest Etchell 22 built in the UK.
1976	First GRP cruiser built, Comfort 30 (Casual Comfort).
1980	Yard went into liquidation. Terry Hooper then ran the yard servicing mostly the US Navy submarine base. After the Navy left the Holy Loch Hooper's Yard, as it was then known, was sold in the 1990s.
1993	Lower Yard sold to Highlands and Islands Enterprise.
2003	Upper Yard sold for housing development.
2009	Lower Yard site being incorporated in the Holy Loch Marina expansion programme.

== Yachting history - emergence of the Clyde and Robertsons Yard ==
This section provides a brief history of yachting in the UK and attempts to put the emergence of the Clyde and the story of Robertson's Yard in context.

During the early part of the 17th century sailing for 'private pleasure' began in the Netherlands. However, it was only after King Charles II of England returned from exile in the Netherlands in 1660, and was presented with a yacht named Mary, did sailing begin on the Thames. Prior to this time the word 'yacht' was completely unknown in England. The first yacht race, which was patronised by the royal court, took place on the Thames in 1662. It is believed that due to Royal connections, private sailing started to become popular in Cork during the late 17th century. The first yacht club in the world, 'The Water Club of the Harbour of Cork', was established in 1720. This famous club was subsequently reformed and went on to become the Royal Cork Yacht Club in 1831.

In the 18th century yachting in Britain was a very much an exclusive sport enjoyed only by the very rich, aristocrats and Royalty. From the middle to the end of the 18th century some races took place, but yachting developed very slowly.

During the 19th century yachting became a much less exclusive sport. Although there were only a few yachts over 35 tons at the start of the century, the British yacht fleet increased dramatically from around 50 in 1812, to 500 in 1850 and 2,200 by 1902.

The first yacht club in England was formed out of the Cumberland Society fleet in 1775 and went on to become the Royal Thames Yacht Club in 1830. The Yacht Club of Cowes was founded in 1815, which became the Royal Yacht Squadron in 1833. Regular weekly races were being organised at Cowes from 1826. Although yachting started on the Thames, the Solent became a much more popular venue by the middle of the 19th century. The first American yacht arrived in Cowes in 1851, which heralded the start of sailing as an international sport, and was a precursor to the America's Cup.

The first yacht club on the Clyde was the Northern Yacht Club, which appeared in 1824 and received its Royal Warrant in 1831. The club was founded to organise and encourage the sport, and by 1825 Scottish and Irish clubs were racing against each other on the Clyde. However, it was not until 1856 and the foundation of the Clyde Model Yacht Club (which later became the Royal Clyde Yacht Club) that regular weekly races took place. The Royal Yacht Club became a driving force of Clyde yachting, as three leading designers: William Fife III, George Lennox Watson and Alfred Mylne were among their members. The two senior clubs on the Clyde, the Royal Northern and the Royal Clyde, were amalgamated in 1978 to become the Royal Northern and Clyde Yacht Club.

The first recorded Clyde racing yacht, a 46-ton cutter, was built by Scotts of Greenock in 1803. Scottish yacht designer William Fife started designing yachts as early as 1807, but his first large yacht Lamlash, a 50-ton yawl, was not completed until 1812. This was the first Scottish yacht to cruise in the Mediterranean.

The rapid growth of Glasgow as an industrial city at the beginning of the 19th century was a direct result of an early project to deepen the Clyde, which was completed in 1812. The Industrial Revolution and growing overseas trade brought great wealth to the region. Many wealthy industrialists bought houses along the coast, away from all the pollution of the big cities, and developed a great passion for yachting.

However, yacht building and yachting didn't really take off on the Clyde until the middle of the 19th century. During the 1850s' the new sailing clubs were very active and William Fife & Sons dramatically increased the rate of building yachts at Fairlie from 2 to 5 per year. During the 1860s' the yard had become well established and building increased from 5 to 9 yachts every year. By the end of the century a series of yachts had been designed specifically for sailing on the Clyde: 17/19; 19/24; 30-foot (9.1 m) restricted.

While Robertson's boatyard was founded in 1876 it did not start launching top class racing yachts until the 1890's. The era of building big classic racing yachts at the yard commenced with the 15-Metre Shimna, which was designed by the world famous W Fife III in 1907.

The creation of the International Yacht Racing Union and the International Rule in 1907 provided a big boost to yacht building in the early part of the 20th century, and prior to World War I, the British yachting fleet had grown to around 3,900. The emergence of a group of talented Clyde yacht designers such as William Fife III, George Lennox Watson, Alfred Mylne, James McGruer and David Boyd in the first half of the 20th century firmly established the pre-eminent position of Clyde yachts on the high seas. The River Clyde became, like Cowes and Kiel, a centre for yachting.
