= Loch Long (disambiguation) =

Loch Long is a body of water in Argyll and Bute, Scotland.

Loch Long may also refer to:

- Loch Long (Highlands), a body of water in Kintail, on the western coast of Scotland
- Loch Long One Design, a wooden sailing yacht design
