= Ohlson 38 =

Swedish-designed cruiser racer sailing yacht

The Ohlson 38 is a 38-foot (12 m) cruiser racer sailing yacht designed by Swedish naval architect Einar Ohlson. About 128 of these boats have been built at various boat yards in Europe. The Ohlson 38 is known for its speed, which has been proven in a number of races.

In 1967 the Ohlson 38 was created by Swedish designer Einar Ohlson. It was an extended version of his 36-footer Einar Ohlson was a well-known 5.5 M boat designer in the 1960s like Bill Luders, Ray Hunt or Britton Chance, Jr. His boats are still raced today as classics within the 5.5 M race circuit.

The Ohlson 38 was GRP-produced, in contrast to the 36s, which were built from wood. The GRP hulls for the Ohlson 38 were laminated by the Tyler Boat Company Ltd. in Tonbridge, Kent in the United Kingdom and so were decks including the coachroof. The Ohlson Brothers (Bröderna Ohlson AB) in Västra Frolunda near Gothenburg finished boats primarily for the US market. Other yards finished these boats, including Malö in Henån, Matthiessen und Paulsen in Arnis/Germany, and Alexander Robertsons & Sons in Sandbank, Argyll, Scotland.

Einar Ohlson’s work has been recognized by The Encyclopedia of Yacht Designers.

The Ohlson 38 is an ocean-going cruiser, and many extended voyages have been made with these boats, including Clare Francis's Observer Single-handed Trans-Atlantic Race with 'Robertson's Golly', a woman's world-record transatlantic crossing speed record. and other voyages have been written about by Richard "Jud" Henderson, and Johanna Michaelis and Klaus Nölters with their circumnavigation on Ole Hoop.
