= Alexander Robertson (shipwright) =

Scottish shipwright (1851–1937)

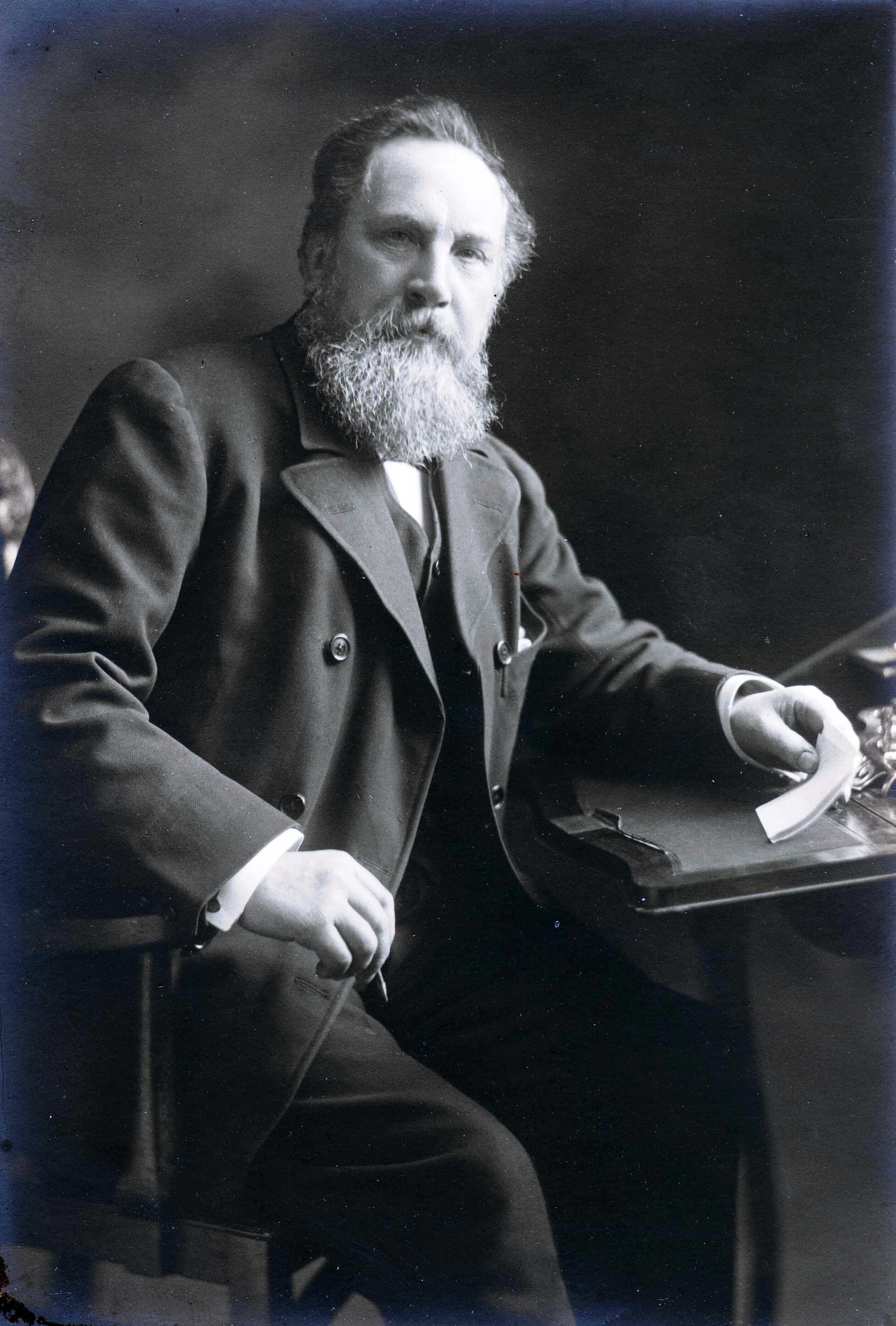
- Born: 29 August 1851; Inverkip, Scotland
- Died: 15 February 1937 (aged 85)
- Occupation: Shipwright

Alexander Robertson (29 August 1851 – 15 February 1937) was a Scottish shipwright.

== Early life ==
Robertson, was born in Inverkip, Renfrewshire, in 1851, the son of a crofter/fisherman from Tarskavaig on the Isle of Skye. Following the catastrophic potato blight on Skye in 1846, his father left Tarskavaig to seek a better life fishing on the River Clyde. After his parents moved to Sandbank, Argyll, in 1859 to run the village Post Office, his father taught him to sail and look after boats.

== Career ==
By the age of 16, Robertson had started work as an apprentice with the Dunoon boatbuilder Ewen Sutherland, who came from a family of boatbuilders in Portree on the Isle of Skye. After his initial training, further experience was acquired at Alexander Stephen and Sons Ltd. of Linthouse, one of the main yards in the Govan area of Glasgow.

In 1876, at the age of 25, he teamed up with Daniel Kerr to form Robertson & Kerr, Boat Builders and Carpenters (renamed Alexander Robertson & Sons in 1922). He built small boats at his workshop in Sandbank, on the shores of the Holy Loch. These initially included modest 'clinker' craft and fishing skiffs but they also carried out repairs, hired and stored boats, laid moorings and even earned money from fishing. This workshop was located in the grounds of his parents' Post Office (now Eckvale) near the old primary school. On 17 October 1878, the Robertson & Kerr partnership was dissolved when the latter accepted a job with the Clyde Lighthouse Trust. Robertson went on to acquire larger premises in order to expand the business. He initially designed many of the yachts and launches himself but in later years used many leading designers of the day to carry out work on the larger boats. Robertson remained chairman of the company until 1935, two years before his death.

Robertson continued working at the small workshop for several years, for the most part repairing boats. As business was booming, he began looking for larger premises and found an old distillery site (owned by Dugald McKinley, 1825–1833) with around 2 acres (8,100 m^{2}) of land, ample supplies of fresh water and good access to the sea. The land was purchased in 1879 and the first shed constructed in 1880. By 1887, the first phase of development of the site had been completed, and Robertson had the largest number of yachts (47) under his charge of any yard in Scotland. Construction of a slipway, to launch larger boats (greater than 25 ft), was held up for several years (1887–1892) because of the proposed plans to build the Clyde Ardrishaig and Crinan Railway, which would have passed through the yard.

== Personal life ==
Robertson (second from left) and what is believed to be three of his five sons (c. 1920)

Robertson not only provided a significant source of employment in Sandbank, but he also played an important part in the local community. He made notable contributions in a number of areas, including as Argyll County Councillor, representing Cowal; parish councillor; justice of the peace; member of the school board; director of Dunoon District Cottage Hospital; on the board of management of the Parish Church and he was also responsible for organising many social gatherings in the village hall. He also took a very keen interest in yacht racing in the Holy Loch, even in his later years.

Four of Robertson's sons helped to run the business in later years: Archibald, Alexander (Alec), Donald and George. A fifth son, James, trained as a naval architect and worked for Lloyd's Register of Shipping, making a significant contribution to the restoration of the famous tea clipper Cutty Sark, which is on display in London.

== Death ==
Alexander Robertson died in 1937, aged 85.
