= Eilean (yacht) =

Ketch designed and built by William Fife

- Nation: Italy
- Designer(s): William Fife
- Builder: William Fife & Son
- Launched: 1936
- Owner(s): Panerai

Specifications
- Type: Ketch
- Displacement: 50 tons
- Length: 22 m
- Beam: 4.65 m
- Draft: 3.25 m
- Sail area: 301 m2

Notes
- Captain : Andrew Cully

Eilean is a 70 foot ketch designed and built in 1936 by William Fife. She was built for the Fulton brothers, who were Scottish steel merchants. The yacht was at some time in the 1960s owned by Hartley Shawcross, who sold her to a yacht charter business in English Harbour, Antigua.

== "Rio" music video ==
She is perhaps best known for featuring in the music video of the 1982 song "Rio" by British pop band Duran Duran. The band chartered Eilean from a charter company in Antigua, and the music video features footage of the band singing and playing around on the yacht as she speeds across the Caribbean Sea.

== Subsequent damage ==
Shortly after the filming of the "Rio" music video, Eilean collided with a ferry, breaking her mizzenmast. She then sank on her mooring whilst waiting for repairs.

== Panerai restoration ==
In 2006, Angelo Bonati, the CEO of Italian watch manufacturer Panerai saw the boat in English Harbour in a state of disrepair. Bonati arranged for the yacht to be restored. The boat was sent to a shipyard in Italy for restoration. She was re-launched in 2009 as part of an advertising campaign for the Panerai brand. In 2012, some members of original Duran Duran lineup were present when Eilean was included in a "classic yacht regatta" in Antigua.

== See also ==
- Drum (yacht)
