= Loch Long One Design =

Boat
- Crew: 2–3
- Draft: 0.81 m (2 ft 8 in)

Hull
- Hull weight: 544 kg (1,199 lb)
- LOA: 6.4 m (21 ft 0 in)
- LWL: 4.65 m (15 ft 3 in)
- Beam: 1.78 m (5 ft 10 in)

Sails
- Mainsail area: 14 m^{2} (150 sq ft)
- Jib/genoa area: 4 m^{2} (43 sq ft)
- Spinnaker area: 17 m^{2} (180 sq ft)

The Loch Long One Design is a small wooden sloop rigged keelboat. The design was commissioned by members of Loch Long Sailing Club to mark the 1937 coronation of King George VI and Queen Elizabeth and to replace their existing sailing craft with a low cost design which was capable of safe use in the local conditions found on Loch Long and the Firth of Clyde. The lines of the Swedish Stjärnbåt were adapted by James Croll to add a counter stern, alter construction from clinker to carvel and allow a permanent backstay to be fitted.

== Development ==
In order to keep ownership costs down and preserve the integrity of the Loch Long as a 'one design' class, new technology and ideas have been introduced sparingly and slowly. Although the spinnaker was first flown on the Solent in the 1960s, this somewhat capricious sail was not adopted by the class until 1975. Aluminium alloy masts were experimented with around the same time, but were not adopted for reasons of cost. Sails made of humanmade fibres were experimented with after the Second World War, and were adopted in 1961. Local conditions of strong tides and regular light winds caused sailors on the Forth to adopt a genoa with a larger sail area than the original jib. In the 1990s, a battened jib with an increased sail area was developed to enhance sail durability and performance. New Loch Longs with strip planked hulls were admitted to the class in 1994; 5 boats have been constructed using this method so far, which is significantly cheaper to build than the original carvel construction.

== Miscellany ==
- The first five Loch Longs cost just £66 each, compared to £300 for a Dragon OD (May 1937).
- Luxury items – Minx, No 10, built in 1938, was banned from racing until 1946. Built by Colquhoun for James Croll, her cost was twice that of a standard LLOD and she was considered a ‘luxury’ version, with a significantly lighter hull and heavier keel.
- The price for a new one has risen with inflation and the rise in the cost of labour and materials; by 1949 the cost had risen to £425, and to £495 by 1963. The first strip-plank Loch Long, No.136 Viva built in 1993, cost £15,000.
- Loch Long number 8 Ripple appeared in the 1949 film Floodtide.
- Loch Long number 6 Sirocco was hit by a malfunctioning torpedo on 3 July 1957.
- Out of more than 130 built, over 100 are believed to still exist.

== Geographic Spread ==
There are active racing fleets at Cove Sailing Club on the Clyde and Aldeburgh Yacht Club on the River Alde. In the past there have been fleets at Gourock, Tighnabruaich, Fairlie and Largs on the Clyde, and Granton on the Firth of Forth. A few Loch Longs have escaped the straitjacket of racing and may be found elsewhere. They have been seen as far afield as Kyle of Lochalsh, Falmouth and even across the Atlantic; at least one was exported to the US, and another was transported to Brazil by the artist Simon Starling and features as a piece of installation art.

== Builders ==
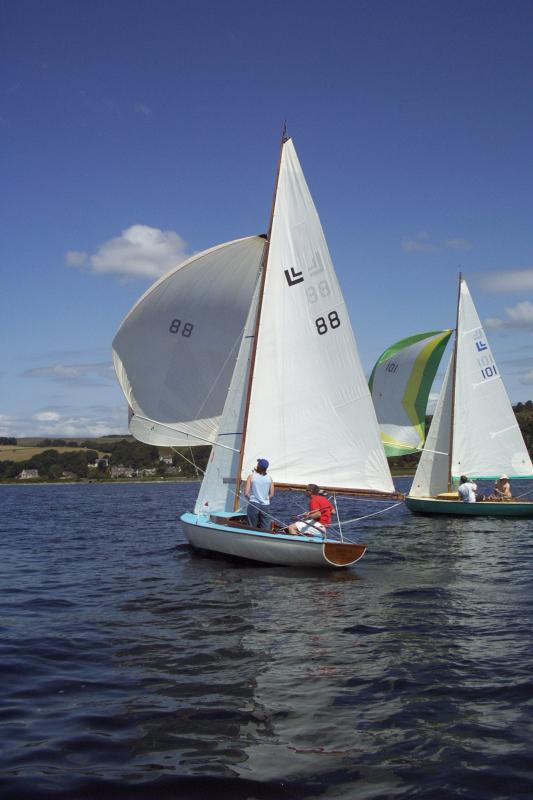
Loch Long Number 88 'Bora'

- Aldeburgh Boatyard Now 'Demon Yachts'
- R F Upson & Sons, Aldeburgh

== Builders no longer trading ==
- Alexander Robertson & Sons
- William Boag of Largs
- James Colquhoun & Sons of Dunoon
- Robert Shaw of Cove
- Nunn Bros. of Woodbridge, Suffolk
- Bute Slip Dock Co. of Bute
- J. Rodger of Glasgow
- D. Munroe & Sons of Gairletter
- C. Whisstock of Woodbridge, Suffolk
- Fairlie Yacht Slip of Fairlie
- McKellar's Slipway of Kilcreggan

== Links ==
List of keelboat classes designed before 1970
