= Charles Ernest Nicholson =

British yacht designer

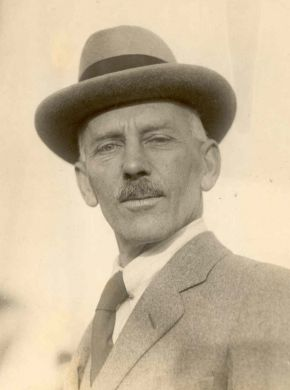
- Born: 1868
- Died: 26 February 1954 (aged 85–86)
- Occupation: Yacht designer

Charles Ernest Nicholson, OBE, RDI (12 May 1868 – 26 February 1954) was a British yacht designer.

== Biography ==
He was born in 1868, one of four sons and six daughters of Benjamin Nicholson (1828-1906), also a yacht designer, and the original Nicholson of Camper and Nicholson. His eldest brother, Benjamin Watson Nicholson (1857-1927), and younger brother, Arthur William Nicholson (1872-1957) also became directors of the firm.

Nicholson's first design of note was the Redwing class. The Bembridge sailing club met in October 1896 to agree the need for a shallow draughted yacht - to allow for the shoal waters of Bembridge Harbour - which could be sailed single-handed, to replace the expensive half racers. Nicholson designed the yacht in ten days, and by 1898 the fleet consisted of 16 boats, all built by the Camper & Nicholsons shipyard.

In the early 1900s, Nicholson developed a new powered craft which would enable the owners to come from their "big-boats" before and after the competitions. Named the Gelyce class, the name derived from the combined first and last letter of the wives of the three brothers: Gertie (married to Ben Jr), Lucy (married to Charles), and Constance (married Arthur).

In 1912, Nicholson introduced the 15mR design Istria with a Marconi rig, the first yacht in the world with a lightweight, laminated wood construction. This led to further developments and growing expertise in the use of lightweight materials which saw its fruition in the use of plywood in deck construction. This ultimately led to arguably Nicholson's most beautiful sailing creation, the 1927 commissioned Vira (later Creole) was built on behalf of Alexander Smith Cochran.

He died on 26 February 1954.

== Nicholson designs ==
- Dacia (5-rater, 1891)
- Marigold (cutter, 1892) - still sails
- Avel (cutter, 1896) - still sails as tender to Creole (see below)
- Black Swan (originally Brynhyld, yawl, 1899) - still sails
- Merrymaid (handicap cruising yacht, 1904) - still sails
- Norland (schooner, 1904)
- Nyria (first large Bermuda cutter, 1906)
- Brynhild II (23mR, 1907)
- Joyette (originally Almara) (101 ft, 1907) - under refit
- Orion (racing schooner, 1910) - still sails
- Istria (15mR, 1912)
- The Brat of Dunkirk (38 Yawl, 1913)-Hout Bay Yacht Club - restoration project
- Marguerita (racing schooner, 1913)
- Pamela (15mR, 1913)
- Paula III (15mR, 1913)
- Shamrock IV (Universal Rule 75-footer, 1914) for Sir Thomas Lipton
- Patricia (R-Class, 1921)
- BARBARA (Bermuda yawl, 1923) - still sails
- Borgila (6mR, built 1924 in Gothenborg, GKSS No.1) - still sails
- Sylvia (Bermuda ketch, 1925) - still sails
- Hurrica V (24 m ketch, 1924, Nicholson design 315), Built in Australia, restored at Norman Wrights in Brisbane, en route to San Francisco
- Creole (originally Vira, three-mast staysail schooner, 1927) - still sails
- Astra (23mR, 1928) - still sails
- Lady Van (Universal Rule “R” Class, 1928) - still sails
- Candida (23mR, 1929) - still sails
- Driac (Bermudian cutter, 40', 1930) - still sails
- Shamrock V (J-class yacht, 1930) for Sir Thomas Lipton - still sails
- Patience (Bermuda cutter, 1931) - still sails
- Velsheda (J-class yacht, 1933) - still sails
- Endeavour (J-class yacht, 1934) - still sails
- Endeavour II (J-class yacht, 1936)
- Bloodhound (12mR, 1936) - still sails
- Gadwall (30' Bermuda Sloop, 1939) - Xyris Class - still sails (one of a class of eight yachts designed in the late 1930s)
- Oiseau de Feu (originally Firebird X, offshore racing ketch, 1937) - still sails
- Trivia (12mR, 1937) - still sails
- Folly (8mR first rule) 1909 was his boat (Mr Charles E Nicholson designed for himself and was built at Camper & Nicholson in Gosport). Still sails and race.
