= Poulton =

Poulton may refer to:

== Places in England ==
- Poulton, Cheshire
  - RAF Poulton
- Poulton-with-Fearnhead, civil parish in Warrington, Cheshire
- Poulton, Merseyside, an area of Wallasey
  - Liscard and Poulton railway station
- Poulton, Gloucestershire
- Poulton or Poulton Lancelyn, a locality in Bebington, Merseyside
- Poulton-le-Fylde, Lancashire
- Poulton-le-Sands, the village that became Morecambe, Lancashire

== People with the surname ==
- Alonzo Poulton, English footballer
- Bruce Poulton (1927–2015), American university administrator
- Diana Poulton (1903–1995), English lutenist
- Edward Bagnall Poulton (1856–1943), British zoologist
- Edward Palmer Poulton (1883–1939), British physician and physiologist
- Ferdinand Poulton (1601–1641), English missionary
- George Poulton (1929–2010), English footballer
- George R. Poulton (1828–1867), English songwriter
- Harry Poulton (born 1919–1981), Canadian sprint canoer
- Henry Mortimer Poulton (1898–1973), administrator in British India
- Jared Poulton (born 1977), Australian footballer
- John Poulton, American engineer
- Joanna Poulton, British medical researcher
- Leah Poulton (born 1984), Australian cricketer
- Mabel Poulton (1901–1994), British film actress
- Mike Poulton, English translator
- Neil Poulton (born 1963), Scottish designer
- Peter Poulton (born 1970), British radio personality
- Richie Poulton (born 1962), New Zealand psychologist
- Ronald Poulton-Palmer (1889–1915), English rugby player
- Tom Poulton (1897–1963), British magazine and medical illustrator, and erotic artist
