= Kabbani =

Kabbani (Arabic: قباني), and its variant Qabbani, is a surname of Arabic origin. Notable people with the surname include:

== Kabbani ==
- Ali Kabbani (born 1999), known as Myth (gamer), American YouTube personality
- Hisham Kabbani (1945–2024), Lebanese-American Sufi scholar
- Rana Kabbani (born 1958), Syrian-British cultural historian and writer

== Qabbani ==
- Ghalia Qabbani, Syrian writer
- Nizar Qabbani (1923–1998), Syrian diplomat and poet
- Sabah Qabbani (1928–2015), Syrian diplomat
