= Bill Dally =

American computer scientist and educator (born 1960)

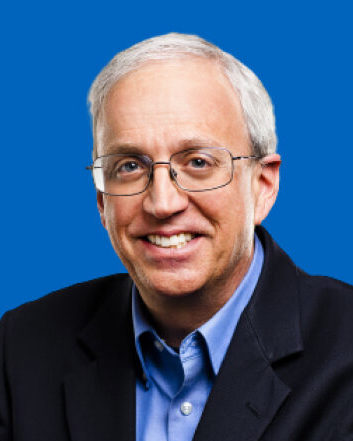
- Dally in 2021
- Born: William James Dally; August 17, 1960 (age 66)
- Education: Virginia Tech (BS); Stanford University (MS); California Institute of Technology (PhD)
- Awards: Maurice Wilkes Award (2000); ACM Fellow (2002); IEEE Fellow (2002); Seymour Cray Award (2004); Charles Babbage Award (2006); AAA&S Fellow (2007); Eckert–Mauchly Award (2010); Benjamin Franklin Medal (2025); Queen Elizabeth Prize for Engineering (2025)
- Scientific career
- Workplaces: Bell Labs; Stac Electronics; Stream Processors, Inc.; MIT; Stanford; Nvidia
- Thesis: A VLSI Architecture for Concurrent Data Structures (1986)
- Doctoral advisor: Charles Seitz
- Doctoral students: Andrew A. Chien; Stephen W. Keckler

William James Dally (born August 17, 1960) is an American computer scientist and educator. He is the chief scientist and senior vice president at Nvidia and was previously a professor of Electrical Engineering and Computer Science at Stanford University and MIT. Since 2021, he has been a member of the President's Council of Advisors on Science and Technology (PCAST).

== Microelectronics ==
He developed a number of techniques used in modern interconnection networks including routing-based deadlock avoidance, wormhole routing, link-level retry, virtual channels, global adaptive routing, and high-radix routers. He has developed efficient mechanisms for communication, synchronization, and naming in parallel computers including message-driven computing and fast capability-based addressing. He has developed a number of stream processors starting in 1995 including Imagine, for graphics, signal, and image processing, and Merrimac, for scientific computing.

He has published over 200 papers as well as the textbooks Digital Systems Engineering with John Poulton, and Principles and Practices of Interconnection Networks with Brian Towles. He was inventor or co-inventor on over 70 granted patents.

== Career ==
=== Bell Labs ===
Dally has received a bachelor's degree in electrical engineering from Virginia Tech. While working for Bell Telephone Laboratories he contributed to the design of the Bellmac 32, an early 32-bit microprocessor, and earned a master's degree in electrical engineering from Stanford University in 1981. He then went to the California Institute of Technology (Caltech) from 1983 to 1986, graduating with a Ph.D. degree in computer science in 1986. At Caltech he designed the MOSSIM simulation engine and an integrated circuit for routing. While at Caltech, he was part of the founding group of Stac Electronics in 1983.

=== MIT ===
From 1986 to 1997 he taught at MIT where he and his group built the J–Machine and the M–Machine, parallel machines emphasizing low overhead synchronization and communication. During his MIT times he claims to have collaborated on developing design of Cray T3D and Cray T3E supercomputers.

=== Stanford ===
He joined the Stanford faculty in 1997, where he became the Willard R. and Inez Kerr Bell Professor in the Stanford University School of Engineering and chaired the computer science department from 2005-2009. He is currently an Adjunct Professor at Stanford.

=== Corporate Involvements ===
Dally's corporate involvements include various collaborations at Cray Research since 1989. He did Internet router work at Avici Systems starting in 1997, was chief technical officer at Velio Communications from 1999 until its 2003 acquisition by LSI Logic, founder and chairman of Stream Processors, Inc until it folded.

=== Nvidia and IEEE fellow ===
Dally was elected a Fellow of the Association for Computing Machinery in 2002, and a Fellow of the IEEE, also in 2002. In 2003 he became a consultant for Nvidia for the first time and helped to develop GeForce 8800 GPUs series. He received the ACM/SIGARCH Maurice Wilkes Award in 2000, the Seymour Cray Computer Science and Engineering Award in 2004, and the IEEE Computer Society Charles Babbage Award in 2006. In 2007 he was elected to the American Academy of Arts and Sciences.

In January 2009 he was appointed chief scientist of Nvidia. He worked full-time at Nvidia, while supervising about 12 of his graduate students at Stanford. He is currently chief scientist and SVP of Nvidia Research.

Among many contributions to technology at Nvidia, Dally also kick-started optical interconnects for GPU and computing systems using micro ring modulators utilizing multiple wavelengths. These systems can lead to the adoption of very high bandwidth, low energy per bit optical interconnects in GPUs and also lead to circuit switched GPU datacenters with significant boost to AI computing efficiency.

In 2009, he was elected to the National Academy of Engineering for contributions to the design of high-performance interconnect networks and parallel computer architectures.

He received the 2010 ACM/IEEE Eckert–Mauchly Award for "outstanding contributions to the architecture of interconnection networks and parallel computers."

In 2025 he was awarded the Queen Elizabeth Prize for Engineering jointly with Yoshua Bengio, Geoffrey E. Hinton, John Hopfield, Yann LeCun, Jen-Hsun Huang and Fei-Fei Li.

== Personal life ==
Dally is married and has three children. He had a flight mishap in 1992 when the Cessna 210 he was flying from Hanscom Field, Massachusetts to Farmingdale, New York in bad weather conditions experienced an oil leak. He was forced to make a crash landing in the Long Island Sound and was retrieved by a rescue sailboat.

== Works ==
- Dally, William J.; Harting, Curtis (2012). Digital Design: A Systems Approach. Cambridge University Press. ISBN 978-0-521-19950-6.
- Dally, William J.; Towles, Brian (2004). Principles and Practices of Interconnection Networks. Elsevier. ISBN 978-0-12-200751-4.
- Dally, William J.; Poulton, John W. (1998). Digital Systems Engineering. Cambridge University Press. ISBN 978-0-521-59292-5.
