= The Book of Cairo =

2019 anthology of stories about Shanghai

The Book of Cairo is an anthology of ten stories from various Egyptian writers, edited by Raph Cormack and published on 16 June 2019. It is the eleventh book of the Reading the City series, focused on stories from and about a certain city, in this case Cairo in Egypt.

== Content ==
- Introduction by Raph Cormack
- Gridlock by Mohamed Salah al-Azab, translated by Adam Talib
- Talk by Mohammed Kheir, translated by Kareem James Abu-Zeid
- Whine by Hatem Hafez, translated by Raphael Cohen
- The Soul at Rest by Hend Ja'far, translated by Basma Ghalayini
- Into the Emptiness by Hassan Abdel Mawgoud, translated by Thoraya El-Rayyes
- The Other Balcony by Nahla Karam, translated by Andrew Leber
- Two Sisters by Eman Abdelrahim, translated by Ruth Ahmedzai Kemp
- Siniora by Ahmed Naji, translated by Elisabeth Jaquette
- Hamada al-Ginn by Nael Eltoukhy, translated by Raph Cormack
- An Alternative Guide to Getting Lost by Areej Gamal, translated by Yasmine Seale
- About the authors
- About the translators

== Background ==
The Book of Cairo was included in "World Literature Today’s 75 Notable Translations of 2019".

Elisabeth Jaquette was also involved in translation for The Book of Gaza and Yasmine Seale also for The Book of Ramallah.

== Reviews ==
Raph Cormack wrote for World Literature Today, that the book is a "successful attempt to capture the essence of Egyptian storytelling in the wake of mass social change and shared trauma". Poupeh Missaghi wrote for Asymptote Journal, that "has no need for camels or pyramids or an exaggeration of whatever the Western eye is looking for. Reading it feels like sitting in a cafe in Cairo with young literary men and women, listening to their stories that dig deep into what Cairo is and is not." James Holden wrote for The Short Story Publishing, that the book is "an entertaining and varied collection."
