= Beecher Moore =

American architect

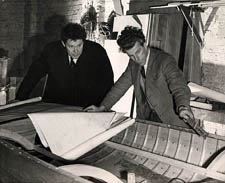
- Beecher with Jack Holt in the 1940s.
- Born: William Beecher Moore; 16 September 1908; Rochester, New York, United States
- Died: 10 November 1996 (aged 88); London, United Kingdom
- Occupations: Businessman and restaurateur

Beecher Moore (16 September 1908 – 10 November 1996) was a highly influential figure in the development of dinghy sailing in the United Kingdom after the Second World War. He worked for many years with Jack Holt who designed numerous dinghies, and together they did much to make sailing a pastime accessible to the masses.

In addition to his interest in sailing Moore had a reputation as something of a larger than life character and successfully pursued a range of other activities including for many years being part-owner of the restaurant Parkes, in Beauchamp Place, London.

== Early years ==
Moore was born in Rochester, New York, US but moved to Britain with his parents while very young. In the 1920s he went to Harvard University but did not complete his degree and instead returned to England to work with his father in his business stationery company, Moore's Modern Methods, which he inherited and ran on his father's death.

During World War II he served as ARP Warden for the Temple, London and had a lease on a flat in a building full of legal chambers where he remained resident for many years.

== Personal life ==
=== Relationships ===
He was married three times, firstly in 1934 to Elizabeth Wynkoop and secondly in 1954 to Barbara (Bobbie) Seale and Naona Van Zile in 1972.

Bobbie's father was theologian Morris S. Seale, her sister was Thea Porter the fashion designer and her brother was writer and journalist Patrick Seale. Beecher and Bobbie had one son, Chadwick. She died in 1971. Moore married Naona Van Zile, ex-wife of Rev. Sidney Lanier the following year.

He died on 10 November 1996 at his flat at the Middle Temple and his funeral was held in Temple Church in the Inner Temple. His ashes are held in the Colombarium of the church with those of his wife Naona.

== Sailing ==
Moore's interest and involvement in sailing increased during the 1930s and he became a member of the Royal Corinthian Yacht Club in Burnham-on-Crouch. Around this time he was involved in the development of what became acknowledged as the first trapeze used in a sailing dinghy - in the form of a bell rope on a Thames A Class Rater.

Moore was an exceptionally talented sailor and over the years won many sailing competitions either solo, as part of a crew or with regular sailing partner Jack Holt. His successes included; the 14-ft Merlin Championships on five occasions in the 1940s, the National Hornet World Championship three times and the 12-ft National Championship once. In 1934 Moore was part of the crew of Endeavour l in the America's Cup when he was the only American to sail aboard the British challenger. He was also heavily involved the administration of sailing at both national and international level. He was senior vice-president of the International 470 class, Chairman of the International Tempest Association and the Mirror 16-ft Association and a vice-president of the Amateur Yacht Research Society.

== Business partnership with Jack Holt ==
Moore joined forces with Thames boatbuilder Jack Holt after the war. The two both worked and sailed together. Holt was a talented boatbuilder, sailor and designer. Together they were instrumental in the development and launching of many dinghy classes including the International 14, Merlin Rocket Hornet, GP 14, Enterprise and Mirror. Holt designed the boats and built the prototypes whilst Moore looked after the marketing and development of each class. The company they formed continues to operate to this day under the name of Holt.

== Interests ==
Moore was a keen patron and collector of art and literature and accumulated a large collection of illustrated and written erotica. In 1964, during the puritanical scare period around the Profumo affair, he made a significant donation to the Private Case collection in the British Library. In the early 1990s he sold another collection of erotic writing and drawings many of which were the work of his friend, the illustrator Tom Poulton. These were collectively published by Taschen in 2006.
