= Qisas (disambiguation) =

Qisas is the concept of retribution in Islamic law.

Qisas or qasas may also refer to:

== Islam ==
- Al-Qaṣaṣ, the 28th chapter of the Qu'ran
- Qisas Al-Anbiya, any of various collections of stories adapted from the Quran and other Islamic literature

== Fiction ==
- Qisas al-Nabiyeen, a book by Abul Hasan Ali Hasani Nadwi
- Qiṣaṣ qaṣīrah, a book by Abdallah Abbas Al-Iryani
- "Qisa Ghareiba", a story by Hazi Helo
- Qisas Khatt al-Istiwa'I, a book by Zakariyau Oseni
- Qiṣaṭ Ukhrá: Qiṣaṣ, a book by Taissier Khalaf

== Other ==
- Ahsan al-Qisas, part of the Selections from the Writings of the Báb, from the founder of Baha'i faith
- Qisa-shazada, the Arabic name for a story of two Christian martyrs
