= Stream processors =

Stream processors may refer to:

- Stream processing, a technique used to accelerate the processing of many types of video and image computations
- Stream Processors, Inc, a semiconductor company that has commercialized stream processing for DSP applications
- Event stream processing, a set of technologies designed to assist the construction of event-driven information systems
