= Suslov's Daughter =

Book by Habib Abdulrab Sarori

- Author: Habib Abdulrab Sarori
- Original title: ابنة سوسلوف
- Translator: Elisabeth Jaquette
- Language: Arabic
- Genre: Novel
- Publisher: Darf Publishers (Eng. trans.)
- Publication date: 2014
- Publication place: Yemen
- English publication date: 2017

Suslov's Daughter (Arabic: ابنة سوسلوف) is a novel by Yemeni writer Habib Abdulrab Sarori. It was longlisted for the 2015 International Prize for Arabic Fiction (also known as the "Arabic Booker"). In 2017, Darf Publishers published an English translation by Elisabeth Jaquette.

Abdulrab Sarori said he was inspired to write the book after witnessing the Arab Spring, and its transformation into armed conflict in Yemen.

== Plot summary ==
The novel tells the history of southern Yemen from 1962 through the 2010s, through the eyes of its narrator Imran, a native of Aden. After having died, he finds himself before a Grim Reaper-type character who asks him about his life. The narrator proceeds to describe his love affairs with five women, beginning as a teenager in Aden and ending as a middle-aged man living in Sanaa, Yemen's capital. He discusses Yemen's turbulent history through the lens of his romantic relationships, including the emergence and collapse of Communism in South Yemen, the growth of militant Islamist groups, and the excitement and disappointment of the Arab Spring.

The novel's title refers to a girl whom the narrator becomes infatuated with as a teenager. The girl is the daughter of a high-ranking Communist official in what was then South Yemen, who is nicknamed "Suslov" after Soviet statesman Mikhail Suslov. Later, after unification of North and South Yemen, the girl's father loses his political influence and becomes devoutly religious. Similarly, the daughter, after becoming an adult, becomes a Salafi upon moving to Sanaa.

== Reception ==
Writing for The National, M. Lynx Qualey gave Suslov's Daughter a mixed review, stating: "If the reader can step around the cardboard depictions of women, Suslov's Daughter is an enjoyably ironic, if hastily sketched, allegory of modern Yemen."
