= Microparallelism =

Microparallelism is the use of software to exploit fine-grained parallelism within standard computer processors, by writing code that allows the full use of existing parallel units within superscalar processors.
