= Abu Khalil al-Qabbani =

Syrian playwright, writer and composer (1833–1903)

- أبو خليل القباني
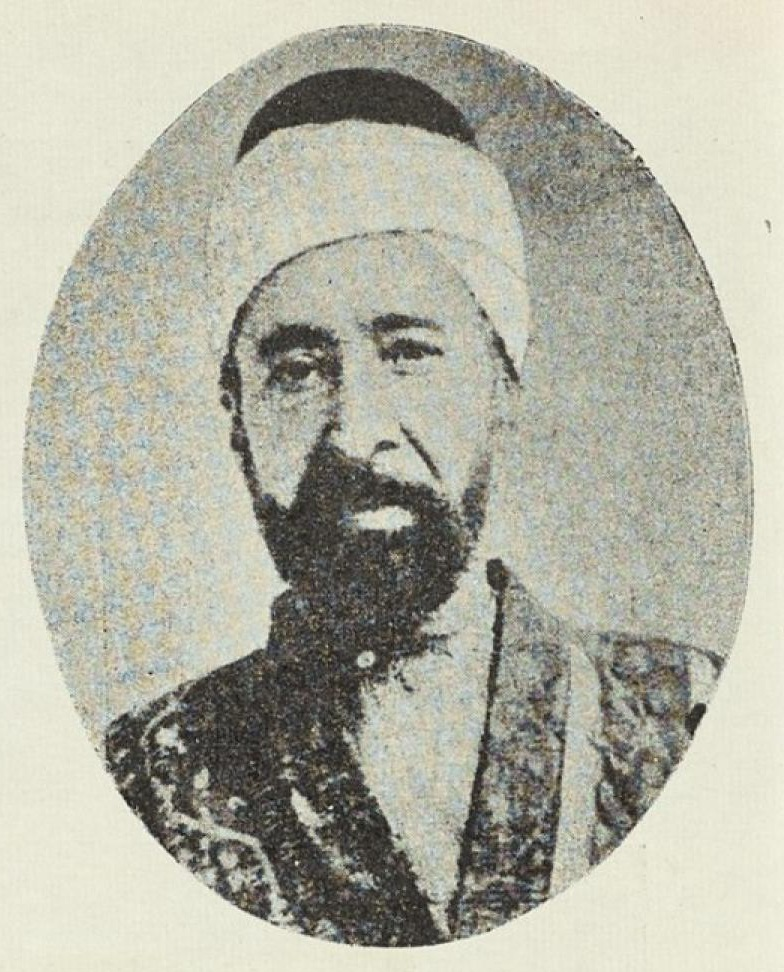
- Born: 1833; Damascus, Ottoman Empire
- Died: 1903 (aged 69–70)
- Occupations: theatre owner, playwright, actor and composer
- Known for: first documented theatre director in Syria

Ahmed Abu Khalil ibn Hussein Agha Aqbiq, known as Abu Khalil al-Qabbani, (Arabic: أبو خليل القباني / ALA-LC: Abū Khalīl al-Qabbānī; 1833–1903) was a Syrian theatre owner, playwright, actor and composer, active as a pioneer of Arab theatre in the 1870s at the time of the Arab nahda movement in Damascus and Cairo.

Al-Qabbani has been called the "Father of Syrian theatre" and has influenced later generations of playwrights and actors. Further, he introduced short musical plays, similar to an operetta in Arabic theatre and worked to establish a theatre district in Damascus.

== Biography ==
Rather than by his birth name Ahmed Abu Khalil ibn Hussein Agha Aqbiq, he is better known as Abu Khalil al-Qabbani. In the early 1870s, after having watched a performance of the play “The Miser” by the French playwright Molière at the Yazariya School in Damascus, he started to produce his own comedies in Arabic. This play had already been staged in Beirut, after Marun Al Naqqash had translated The Miser into Arabic and published it under the title Al-bakhīl in 1847 as the first known Arabic theatrical text.

Al-Qabbani's style of adapting French theatre combined singing, acting and popular improvisation. He is said to have staged about 40 performances, using inspiration from the oral and written literary heritage, such as the One Thousand and One Nights, as well as traditional melodies from Syrian muwashshahat.

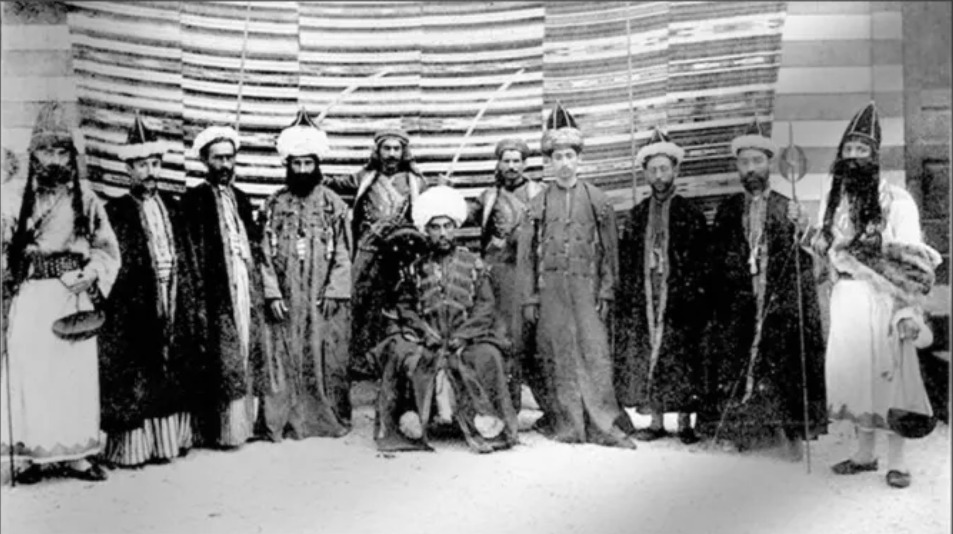
Abu Khalil Qabbani's company in theatrical clothes for the play “Harun al-Rashid”

In the beginning, al-Qabbani used to give female roles in his plays to younger boys with high-pitched voices, because women were not allowed to act in theatre at his time. His play Abu al-Hassan al-Mughaffal caused a wave of protest because of his mockery of the historical Caliph Harun al-Rashid. This enraged religious authorities, who sent a delegation to complain to the Ottoman caliph in Istanbul. Following this, the authorities closed down al-Qabbani's theatre, at the time the only theatre in the region, and prevented theatrical performances in the Ottoman province of Syria. After that, al-Qabbani left for Egypt and produced his plays there until 1900.

In Cairo, his theatre company included the female singer Al-Halabiyya, who was one of the first Arabs to take to the stage, at a time when women's singing in public was largely socially forbidden. She accompanied al-Qabbani to the Chicago World Exposition in 1893, becoming the first Arab singer to perform in front of an American audience, and gained great fame with her song “O Day of the Lover”.

In January 1895, al-Qabbani worked with Abdu al-Hamuli on theatrical productions presented by the Qabbani troupe at the Cairo Opera House. The event has been regarded as the first occasion on which an Arab singer performed at an opera house.

Two years after his return to Syria, al-Qabbani died in 1903.

== Notable relatives ==
Abu Khalil al-Qabbani's brother was the grandfather of the Syrian poet Nizar Qabbani and the diplomat Sabah Qabbani. Other notable relatives include British cultural historian Rana Kabbani of Syrian descent and her daughter, the writer and literary translator Yasmine Seale.

== Reception ==
In 1959, the Ministry of Culture sponsored the 250-seat purpose-built Al-Qabbani Theatre on 29 May Street in the centre of Damascus. Along with the 500 seat Al-Hamra Theatre, inaugurated in 1966, these two stages became the home of the Syrian National Theatre. The national theatre company has been presenting plays written by Syrian, Arab, and international playwrights for decades.

Syrian playwright Saadallah Wannous wrote the play An Evening with Abu Khalil al Qabbani as an homage to Abu Khalil and his heritage. Screenwriter Khairy Alzahaby represented him in the epic TV series Abu Khalil al-Qabbani. Syrian cultural historian Taissier Khalaf published a book about al-Qabbani's visit to the Chicago World Exposition in 1893 as well as another one about al-Qabbani's style of theatre.

In 2025, Al Jazeera Arabic published an article by Syrian novelist and journalist Khalil Sweileh about al-Qabbani's life and work, tracing his career and ending with statements by several Arabic artists paying witness to al-Qabbani's pioneering work. Further, the article stated that "the issues and debates that we thought are part of the past, are still going on today, about censorship and prohibition and the legitimacy of singing, dancing and acting."

== See also ==
- Syrian literature
- List of Syrians
- List of playwrights
