= Stream processor =

Stream processor may refer to:

- Stream processing, a technique used to accelerate the processing of many types of video and image computations.
- Stream Processors, Inc, a semiconductor company that has commercialized stream processing for DSP applications.
- Event Stream Processing, is a set of technologies designed to assist the construction of event-driven information systems.
