= The Book of Ramallah =

2021 anthology of stories about Shanghai

The Book of Ramallah is an anthology of ten stories from various ten writers, edited by Maya Abu Al-Hayat and published on 4 March 2021. It is the sixteenth book of the Reading the City series, focused on stories from and about a certain city, in this case Ramallah in West Bank.

== Content ==
- Introduction by Maya Abu Al-Hayat
- Love in Ramallah by Ibrahim Nasrallah, translated by Mohammad Ghalaieny
- A Tragic Ending by Mahmoud Shukair, translated by Thoraya El-Rayyes
- Secrets Stroll the City's Streets by Ahmed Jaber, translated by Adam Talib
- Get Out of My House by Ziad Khadash, translated by Raph Cormack
- A Garden that Only Drinks from the Sky by Liana Badr, translated by Alexander Hong
- The Horse's Wife von Ahiam Bsharat, translated by Emre Bennet
- Badia's Magic Water by Maya Abu Al-Hayat, translated by Yasmine Seale
- Sura, Surdai Ramallah, Ramallah! by Khaled Hourani, translated by Andrew Leber
- The Sea by Anas Abu Rahma, translated by Raphael Cohen
- At the Qalandiya Checkpoint by Ameer Hamad, translated by Basma Ghalayini
- About the contributions

== Background ==
The Book of Ramallah was included in the lists "69 new books by Black and POC authors" by the Cosmopolitan and "20 of the best books written by Palestinian authors" by the Happy Magazine.

Yasmine Seale was also involved in translation for The Book of Cairo.

== Reception ==
=== Reviews ===
M Lynx Qualey wrote for Middle East Eye, that "the Ramallah of this collection feels something like a big bus terminal, with people coming and going, confused about whose seat is whose, and where often travel is shut down entirely. And yet there are also moments of wicked humour, tender love, and elevating grace." Christopher Linforth wrote for World Literature Today, that the book is "tender and humorous and full of breathtaking moments of wonder in everyday life." Sue Turner wrote for the Morning Star, that the book is "comprehensive picture of the trauma Palestinians suffer under Israeli occupation – and an insight into the people's determination to resist."

=== Awards ===
The Book of Ramallah won one of the English PEN Translates Award 2020.
