= The Book of Gaza =

2014 anthology of stories about Gaza

The Book of Gaza is an anthology of ten stories from various Palestinian writers, edited by Atef Abu Saif and published on 3 Jul 2014. It is the second book of the Reading the City series, focused on stories from and about a certain city, in this case Gaza in Palestine.

== Content ==
- Introduction by Atef Abu Saif, translated by Elisabeth Jaquette
- A Journey in the Opposite Direction by Atef Abu Saif, translated by Tom Aplin
- The Sea Cloak by Nayrouz Qarmout, translated by Charis Bredin
- Red Lights by Talal Abu Shawish, translated by Alice Guthrie
- The Whore of Gaza by Najlaa Ataallah, translated by Sarah Irving
- A White Flower for David by Ghareeb Asqalani, translated by John Peate
- Dead Numbers by Yusra al Khatib, translated by Emily Danby
- When I Cut Off Gaza’s Head by Mona abu Sharekh, translated by Katharine Halls
- Two Men by Abdallah Tayeh, translated by Adam Talib
- You and I by Asma al-Ghul, translated by Alexa Firat
- Abu Jaber Goes Back to the Woods by Zaki al ’El, translated by Max Weiss
- About the authors
- About the translators

== Background ==
Literary works from Gaza are mostly short stories since "the difficulty of smuggling hand-written manuscripts to Jerusalem, Cairo or Beirut for publication led writers to shorten the length." Atef Abu Saif remarks in the introduction, that Gaza hence became known as an "exporter of oranges and short stories."

Abdallah Tayeh recorded a message in Jabaliya Camp in Gaza for the publication, but wasn't able to attend any events in the UK due to the Rafah Border being closed.

Elisabeth Jaquette was also involved in translation for The Book of Cairo.

== Review ==
The Guardian wrote that "these stories provide fascinating snapshots of a culture at a time of crisis and a welcome reminder of the universality of human relations". Patrick Smyth wrote for The Irish Times, that the anthology is composed of "Tales that reflect that depth and the variety and universality of the Gazan experience." Jordan Times wrote "most of the stories by women reflect personal frustrations and longing, exposing outdated social norms that are particularly onerous for females and the hypocrisy involved in perpetuating them," calling the book "a powerful example of Palestinian resilience."
