= Trapeze (sailing) =

Wire used on sailboats

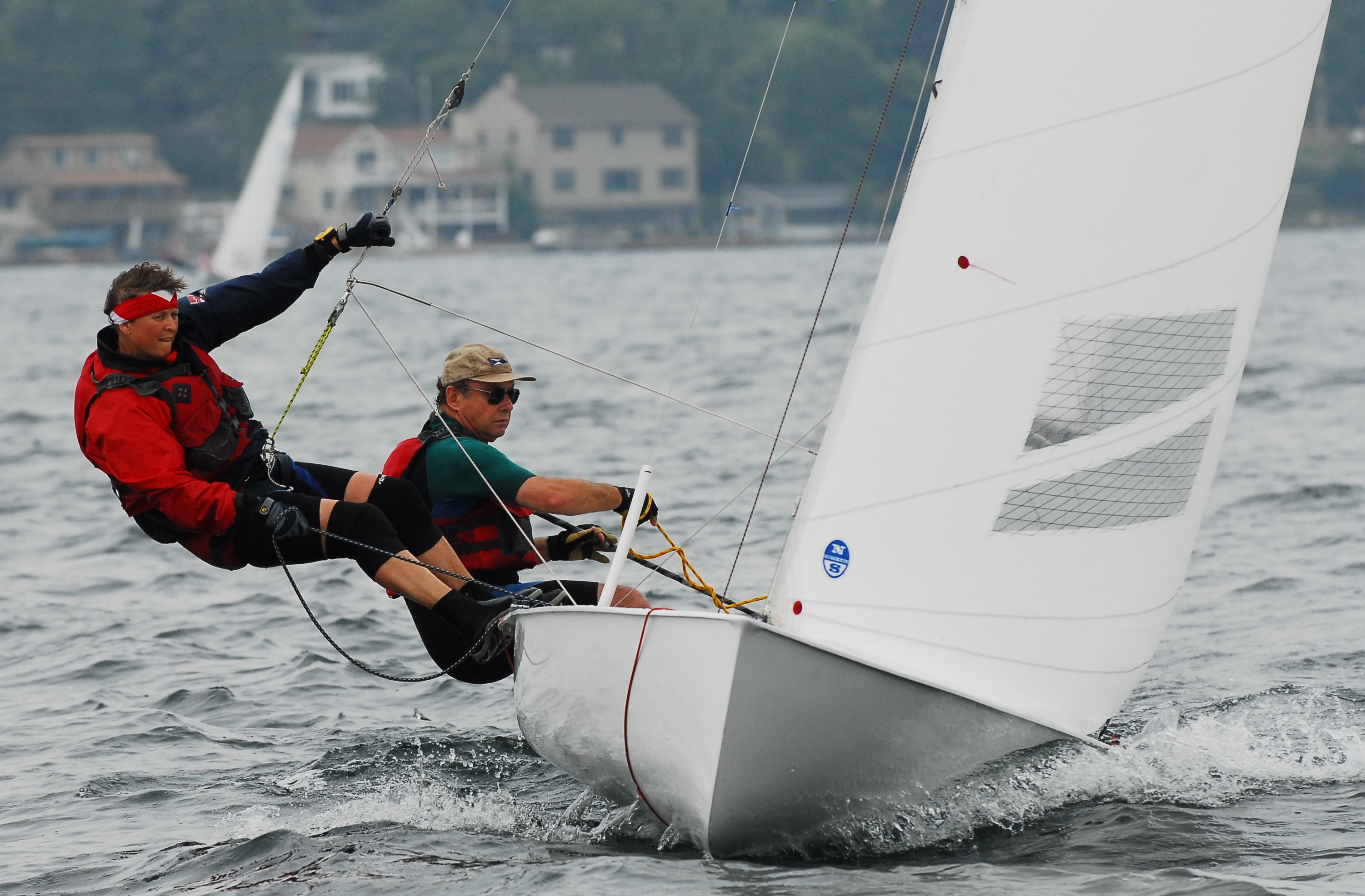
A Flying Dutchman with the crew on the trapeze whilst the helm hikes out.

In sailing, the trapeze is a wire that comes from a point high on the mast, usually where the shrouds are fixed, to a hook on the crew member's harness at approximately waist level. The position when extended on the trapeze is outside the hull, braced against it (or an extension of it outwards) with the soles of the feet, facing the masthead, and clipped on by a hook on the trapeze harness. This gives the crew member more leverage to keep the boat flat by allowing the crew member's centre of gravity to balance the force of the wind in the sails.

An additional benefit is the ability to "walk" along the gunwale to balance the boat's trim fore and aft. This is necessary to prevent racing catamarans such as the Tornado from digging the bow into the water, also called pitchpoling, and causing a nosedive and often a spectacular capsize.

Some boats may have only one trapeze, such as the 420 and the 29er, where only the crew uses the trapeze. Dinghies, such as the International 14 and the 49er, may have trapeze wires for both the skipper and the crew. The trapeze has several colloquial names such as "the wire" or simply "the trap".

When a boat loses power in its sails, and heels to the windward side, the crew on the trapeze may get dipped in the water if they do not react in time.

Some classes allow footloops on the gunwale to allow those on the trapeze to locate their feet with relative security. This helps to prevent the crew from swinging forward, sometimes round the forestay when the boat decelerates suddenly.

== Regulations ==
Due to safety concerns, the International Sailing Federation changed the rules in 2004 concerning trapeze harnesses, effective January 1, 2009: "40.2 A trapeze or hiking harness shall have a device capable of quickly releasing the competitor from the boat at all times while in use.” However, the ISAF 2009–2013 Racing Rules of Sailing which took effect January 1, 2009 does not include this provision, so this rule change is postponed.

Quick release harnesses are already widely in use, and make it possible for sailors to unhook themselves from the wire from all angles while it is under tension, thus decreasing the chance of getting trapped underwater or in dangerous conditions. The adoption of quick release harnesses has not been universal due to the reduced reliability of the moving parts; stories of such systems releasing unexpectedly have caused many to shun them in favour of traditional fixed hooks.

== History ==
There are counterclaims for the origin of the device:

- The trapeze was originated by Beecher Moore at Upper Thames Sailing Club, Bourne End on the River Thames in the United Kingdom on the Thames A Class Rater Vagabond, owned by Beecher Moore. When deployed there for the first time it was called a Bell Rope.
- In 1938 Austin Farrar started his association with the International 14 foot class and a lifelong friendship with Charles Currey. Together they worked on the development of the trapeze, now so common on racing dinghies, which was used so effectively by Peter Scott and John Kift Winter during the championships of that year.
- In 1938 a revolution in dinghy sailing took place in Falmouth. Sailors Peter Scott and John Kift Winter had developed the first 'sea-going' trapeze for use on their International 14, Thunder and Lightning. The duo used their new invention in the 1938 Prince of Wales Cup race in Falmouth and steamed over the finish line ahead of the rest of the fleet. Almost immediately, the Royal Yachting Association Dinghy Committee banned the trapeze over concerns that it was unsporting. It was reintroduced for the Flying Dutchman class 15 years later, but was not used again on an International 14 until 1970.

On balance it seems likely that Peter Scott developed Beecher Moore's Bell Rope, which was satisfactory for river use, into the more seaworthy harness used on Thunder and Lightning in its 1938 Prince of Wales Cup success. The modern trapeze developed from there - in spite of some temporary official opposition.

== See also ==
- Hiking (sailing)
