= Khairy Alzahaby =

Syrian writer (1946–2022)

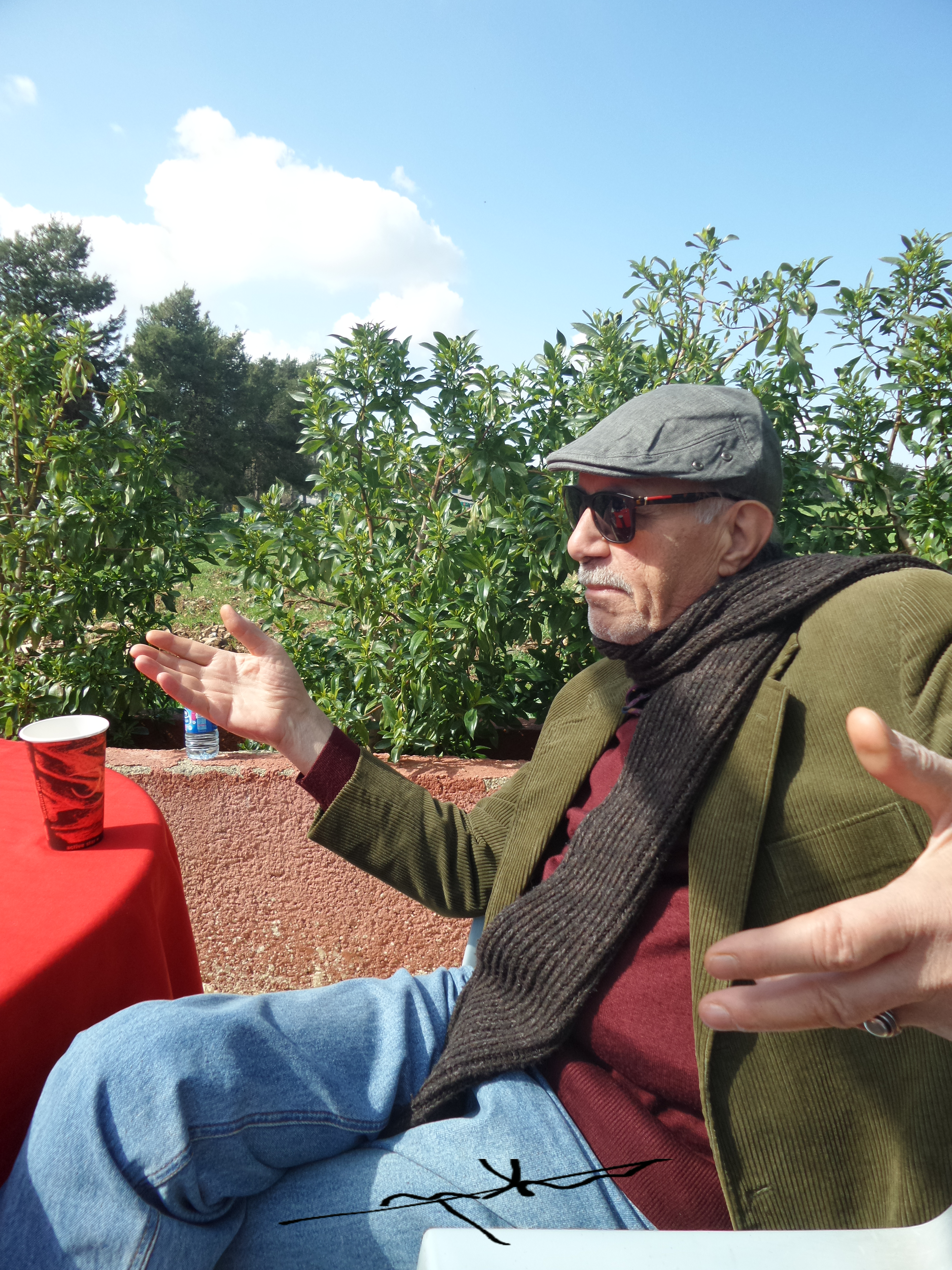
Khairy Alzahaby

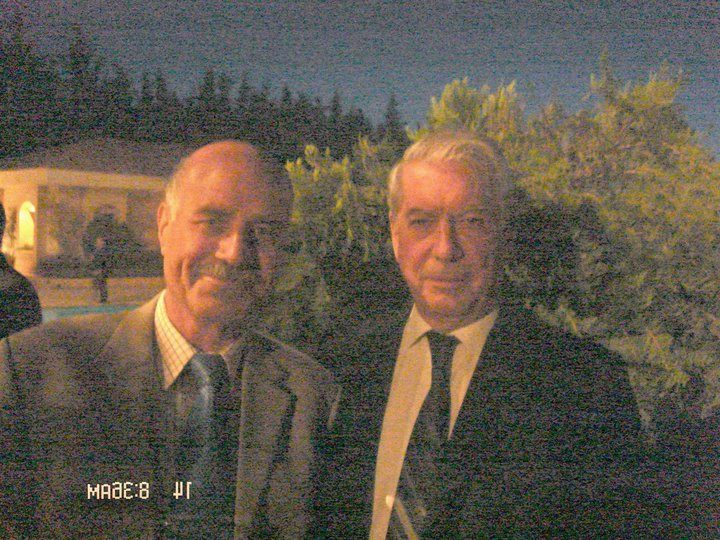
Alzahaby and Mario Vargas Llosa in 2009

Khairy Alzahaby (Arabic: خيري الذهبي; 11 January 1946 – 4 July 2022) was a Syrian novelist, historian, columnist, and scenarist.

== Biography ==
Alzahaby was born in Damascus, Syria, on 11 January 1946. He headed to Egypt in the early sixties to pursue his high study at the Cairo University. He graduated with a degree in Arabic literature and was educated by writers such as Taha Hussein and Naguib Mahfouz.

Politically he was always opposed to the regime in Syria, which made him face severe difficulties in his work and his life. He was one of the supporters of the Damascus Declaration. He was prevented from traveling, withdrew his passport, was fired from his job as a result of his political activity and signed statements against Hafez al-Assad's regime in 1991.

He sided with the 2011 revolution in Syria against the regime, and then left the country to Egypt and then to the UAE and then Jordan and then Europe. He was an independent liberal political social activist, wrote more than 1000 articles in Arab newspapers, and lectured in many cities around the world such as Paris, Madrid, Vienna, Istanbul, Salzburg, Amman, Dubai, Cairo, Damascus, Beirut, Algeria and Casablanca. In 2009, an M.A. thesis in the Department of Arabic Literature was written about his novel Time in Space at Al-Baath University in Homs.

Alzahaby died on 4 July 2022, at the age of 76.

== Bibliography ==
=== Novels ===
- Malakoot Albusataa – novel – 1975 – Damascus.
- Bird of the wonder days – novel – 1977 – Damascus.
- Arabian nights – novel – 1980 – Beirut.
- These roofs of jubata – 1982 – the prize of children literature.
- Alshater Hasan – novel – 1982 – Damascus.
- The other city – novel – 1983 – Damascus.
- Metamorphosis – trilogy:
  - 1 – Haseeba – novel – 1987. It was converted into a film and a television series
  - 2 – Fayyad – novel – 1991
  - 3 – Hisham – novel – 1993
- The over shouldered grandfather..STORIES. 1992
- Training on horrifying..STUDIES. 2004. Damascus.
- The trap of names..NOVEL. 2009. Beirut
- If her name was not Fatima..NOVEL ..2005 Cairo
- The aspirations of Yaseen..NOVEL.2006.. Beirut
- The last dance of the acrobat..NOVEL.. 2008. Damascus.
- The sixth finger 2013. first edition Cairo ،second and third edition Damascus "sard pub" 2013
- lectures in search for the novel.. studies..RAM ALLAH..2017.
- the secret library and the general..2018. Amman 2018
- 300 days in Israel .. 300 يوم في إسرائيل .."almwtawaset pub" ..Rome. ibn batuta prize. 2019
- The Lost Paradise, a novel, Dar Al-Fikr, Beirut, 2021 (الجنة المفقودة) لخيري الذهبي: رواية مدهشة عن دمشق وغزالها الهارب - أورينت نت
- Matches near a dry field, thought studies, United Arab Emirates, 2022

=== TV scripts, drama ===
- 1-Malakoot Albusataa....ملكوت البسطاء
- 2-Al shuttar... الشطار
- 3-The bird of the wonder days....طائر الأيام
- 4-The beast and the lamp Timur.... الوحش والمصباح تيمور لنك
- 5-Abu Hayyan Attawheedy.... ابو حيان التوحيدي
- 6-Building 22....البناء 22
- 7-For you Damascus..1989..لك يا شام
- 8-Claws of Jasmin....مخالب الياسمين
- 9-A rose for the autumn of the age...وردة لخريف العمر
- 10-The dance of birds..1999..رقصة الحبارى
- 11-Haseeba (also turned into a cinema movie)..2006..حسيبة
- 12-The prince of dreams ..2009 (Ibn almutazz)....ابن المعتز
- 13-Abu Khalil Qabbani..2010..أبو خليل القباني.

=== Researchers ===
Alzahaby prepared, documented and presented a chain of books for the benefit of the Ministry of Culture, under the title of "the Horizons of Damascus".. Such as:

1. – The imperial trip "in the visit of the German emperor to Damascus.. Written by Ibrahim Alaswad.
2. – The news of Taimoor lank .. Written by Ibn Arab Shah.
3. – the tattar state.. Written by Ibn sassary
4. – Master of Quraish .. Maaroof Alarnaouty.
5. -The Diaries of Damascus.. Written by Albudairy Alhallaq.
6. – Mansoor Ibn Sarjoon .. Written by Josif Nasrallah.
7. – Al Rawda Alghannaa if Dimashq Alfayhaa.. Written by Numaan Alkustaaky.
8. – The end of Mamaleek .. Written by Ibn Tolon.
9. – The end of Mamaleek .. " The Egyptian view" .. Written by Ibn Iyass.
10. – Damascus .. The reign go Khalifa Abdul Hameed ..written by Mary Sarko.
11. – The castle of Damascus .. Written by Abdulqader Arrihawy.

His novel Hasseeba was chosen by the Arab League as one of the 100 great arabs novels in the last century.

=== Prizes ===
1. Medal of courage and honor After returning from captivity in Israel

.. Damascus..1975

1. these roofs of jubata.. first prize of children .Syrian ministry of culture..1982.
2. '300 DAYS IN ISRAEL' :IBN BATUTA PRIZE FOR FIELD RESEARCH ..Morocco −2019.

== Literature ==
- Ismat, Riad (2019). "Khairy Alzahaby, Gamal el-Ghitani & Halim Barakat". Artists, Writers and the Arab Spring. pp. 73–88. doi:10.1007/978-3-030-02668-4_8. ISBN 978-3-030-02667-7. S2CID 158936627.
