= Basma Abdel Aziz =

Egyptian writer, psychiatrist, visual artist and human rights activist

- بسمة عبد العزيز
- Born: 1976 (age 49–50); Cairo, Egypt
- Occupations: Writer, psychiatrist, visual artist, human rights activist
- Notable work: The Queue, Here Is A Body
- Awards: Sawiris Cultural Award, English PEN Translation Award, Ahmed Bahaa-Eddin Award

Basma Abdel Aziz (Arabic: بسمة عبد العزيز, born 1976 in Cairo, Egypt) is an Egyptian writer, psychiatrist, visual artist and human rights activist, nicknamed 'the rebel'. She lives in Cairo and is a weekly columnist for Egypt's al-Shorouk newspaper. She writes in Arabic, and her novels The Queue and Here Is A Body were published in English. For her literary and nonfiction work, she was awarded the Sawiris Cultural Award and other distinctions.

== Life and career ==
Born in Cairo, Abdel Aziz holds a B.A. in medicine and surgery, an M.S. in neuropsychiatry, and a diploma in sociology. She works for the General Secretariat of Mental Health in Egypt's Ministry of Health and the Nadeem Center for the Rehabilitation of Victims of Torture.

As a writer, Abdel Aziz gained second place for her short stories in the 2008 Sawiris Cultural Award, and a 2008 award from the General Organisation for Cultural Palaces. Her sociological examination of police violence in Egypt, Temptation of Absolute Power, won the Ahmed Bahaa-Eddin Award in 2009.

Her debut novel Al-Tabuur (The Queue) was first published by Dar al-Tanweer in 2013, and Melville House published an English translation by Elisabeth Jaquette in 2016. In 2017, this satirical novel won the English PEN Translation Award. For its dystopian representation of injustice, torture and corruption, it has been compared by the New York Times to George Orwell's Nineteen Eighty-Four and The Trial by Franz Kafka. The novel has also been published in Turkish, Portuguese, Italian and German translations.

In 2016, she was called one of Foreign Policy 's Leading Global Thinkers. In 2018, she was named by The Gottlieb Duttweiler Institute as one of top influencers of Arabic public opinion. Her 2018 novel Here is a body, translated by Jonathan Wright, was published in English in 2011 by Hoopoe, an imprint of American University of Cairo Press.

== Works ==
=== Fiction ===
- May God Make it Easy, 2008
- The Boy Who Disappeared, 2008
- Al-Tabuur (The Queue), 2013
- Hona Badan (Here Is A Body), 2018
- The blueberry Years (Aawam Al touts), 2022

=== Non-fiction ===
- Temptation of Absolute Power, 2009
- Beyond Torture, 2011
- Memory of Repression, 2014
- The Power of the Text, 2016

== See also ==
- Contemporary Arabic literature
- Egyptian literature
