= Hala Lotfy =

Egyptian film director and producer (born 1973)

- Born: 1973 (age 52–53)
- Education: Cairo Film Institute
- Occupations: film director and producer.
- Notable work: documentary Feeling Cold (2005)

Hala Lotfy (born 1973) is an Egyptian film director and producer. She graduated from the Cairo Film Institute in 1999. She is best known for her debut feature film Al Khorug lel Nahar (Coming Forth By Day, 2012) which starred Donia Maher and won numerous awards on the film festival circuit, including the FIPRESCI Prize at the Abu Dhabi Film Festival. Her other noted works include the documentary Feeling Cold (2005) and several documentaries for the Al Jazeera series Arabs of Latin America (2006).
