= Communications of the ACM =

Monthly journal of the Association for Computing Machinery

- Language: English
- Edited by: Andrew A. Chien

Publication details
- History: 1958–present
- Publisher: Association for Computing Machinery (United States)
- Frequency: Monthly
- Open access: Yes
- Impact factor: 11.1 (2023)

Standard abbreviations
- ISO 4: Commun. ACM

Indexing
- ISSN: 0001-0782

Links
- Journal homepage

Communications of the ACM (CACM) is the monthly journal of the Association for Computing Machinery (ACM).

== History ==
It was established in 1958, with Saul Rosen as its first managing editor. It is sent to all ACM members. Articles are intended for readers with backgrounds in all areas of computer science and information systems. The focus is on the practical implications of advances in information technology and associated management issues; ACM also publishes a variety of more theoretical journals. The magazine straddles the boundary of a science magazine, trade magazine, and a scientific journal. While the content is subject to peer review, the articles published are often summaries of research that may also be published elsewhere. Material published must be accessible and relevant to a broad readership.

From 1960 onward, CACM also published algorithms, expressed in ALGOL. The collection of algorithms later became known as the Collected Algorithms of the ACM.

CACM announced a transition to entirely open access in February 2024, as part of ACM's commitment to make all articles open access.

According to the Journal Citation Reports, the journal has a 2023 impact factor of 11.1.

== See also ==
- Journal of the ACM
