= 1981 Iraqi embassy bombing in Beirut =

Shia Islamist terror attack in Lebanon

Iraqi embassy bombing in Beirut
- Part of Lebanese Civil War and spillover of the Iran–Iraq War
- Location: 33°52′31″N 35°29′03″E; Beirut, Lebanon
- Date: 15 December 1981; 44 years ago
- Attack type: Suicide car bomb
- Deaths: 61
- Injuries: 100+
- Perpetrator: Al-Dawa

On December 15, 1981, the Iraqi Shi'a Islamist group al-Dawa carried out a suicide car bombing targeting the Iraqi embassy in Beirut, Lebanon. The explosion leveled the embassy and killed 61 people, including Iraq's ambassador to Lebanon, and injured at least 100 others.

The attack is considered by some to be the second modern suicide bombing, preceded by the 1927 Bath School bombings and presaged the 1983 United States embassy bombing and the 1983 Beirut barracks bombings.

== Background ==
Emboldened by the success of the 1979 Iranian Revolution, the anti-Baathist Shi'a Islamist group al-Dawa, with financial and military assistance from the Islamic Republic of Iran, began to employ violence in its struggle against the Iraqi government. In 1979 and 1980, al-Dawa assassinated a number of "senior but low-profile" Baathist officials in Iraq. In response to a failed assassination attempt on Iraqi Deputy Prime Minister Tariq Aziz in April 1980 by al-Dawa, the Iraqi government launched a severe crackdown on the group, which included the execution of al-Dawa spiritual leader Mohammad Baqir al-Sadr.

The remaining al-Dawa leadership fled to Iran and the group became an "effective proxy" for the Iranian government against Iraq during the Iran–Iraq War, which broke out in September 1980.

== Bombing ==
On December 15, 1981, a car filled with approximately 100 kilograms of explosives was driven into Iraq's embassy building in Beirut by a suicide bomber. The ensuing explosion devastated the embassy, killed 61 people, including the Iraq ambassador, Abdul Razzak Lafta, and injured more than 100 others. Balqis al-Rawi, the Iraqi wife of Syrian poet Nizar Qabbani, who worked for the embassy's cultural section, was also killed in the attack.

== Impact ==
The attack, which presaged the 1983 United States embassy bombing and the 1983 Beirut barracks bombing, is considered by some to be the first modern suicide bombing, though others nominate earlier attacks.

== Alternative attribution ==
Some sources attribute the bombing to Imad Mughniyeh instead.
