= Habib Abdulrab Sarori =

Yemeni computer scientist and novelist (born 1956)

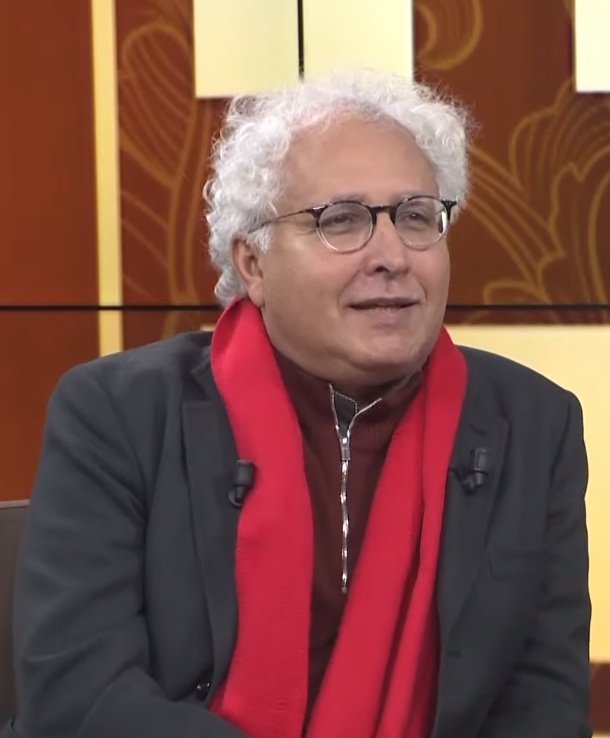
- Sarori, 29 February 2020
- Born: 1956 (age 69–70); Aden, Yemen
- Occupations: Novelist and computer scientist

Habib Abdulrab Sarori (born 1956) is a Yemeni computer scientist and novelist. He was born in Aden and pursued higher studies in France, obtaining a master's degree in Informatics from the University of Paris 6 in 1983, followed by a PhD from the University of Rouen in 1987. He is currently a professor in the Mathematical and Software Engineering Department at Rouen and also at INSA de Rouen. He has published numerous scientific papers over the last two decades. He is also the author of textbooks in computer science.

Abdulrab has published literary works in both French and Arabic. His sole French-language novel, La reine étripée, was published in 1998. Other works include Suslov's Daughter and his most recent novel, Arwa. Suslov's Daughter was longlisted for the 2015 International Prize for Arabic Fiction, and Darf Publishers published an English translation by Elisabeth Jaquette in 2017. His short story The Bird of Destruction was published in English translation in Banipal magazine, in an issue devoted to contemporary Yemeni writing. He is also the author of Production System Engineering.

== Early Life and Upbringing ==
The novelist and Yemeni writer Habib Abdulrab Sarori was born on 15 August 1956 in the Sheikh Othman neighborhood of Aden, to a religious family with interests that had moved from Jabal al-Sarirah village in Taiz Governorate. He was deeply influenced by his father's love for knowledge, who was a student of the scholar Qasim Saleh al-Sarori, and his dedication to reading books on Sufism, Monotheism(Tawhid), Jurisprudence(Fiqh), and Interpretation(Tafsir), as well as reading literature and writing poetry.

At an early age, he studied the rules and rhetoric of Arabic, along with some books of Tafsir and Hadith, under his father's guidance.

He began writing poetry early, and AL-Hikma magazine published his first poems in 1970. His upbringing in the city of Aden left its mark on his literary works.
