= Rania Mamoun =

Sudanese journalist and fiction writer

- رانيا مأمون
- Born: 1979 (age 46–47); Wad Medani, Sudan
- Education: University of Gezira, Sudan
- Occupations: writer, novelist, journalist
- Years active: 2000–present
- Employer: Gezira State TV
- Organizations: AFAC Arab Fund for Arts and Culture; IPAF Nadwa

Rania Ali Musa Mamoun (Arabic: رانيا علي موسى مأمون; born 1979) is a Sudanese fiction writer and journalist, known for her novels, poems and short stories. She was born in the city of Wad Medani in east-central Sudan and was educated at the University of Gezira.

== Early life ==
Rania Ali Musa Mamoun was born in 1979 in Wad Medani, a city in east-central Sudan. She pursued higher education at the University of Gezira, where she developed her interest in literature and writing.

== Career and literary achievements ==
As a journalist, she has been active in both print media and television. In particular, she has edited the culture page of the journal al-Thaqafi, has written a column for the newspaper al-Adwaa and presented a cultural programme on Gezira State TV.

As a literary author, Mamoun has published two novels in Arabic, Green Flash (2006) and Son of the Sun (2013), as well as a short story collection Thirteen Months of Sunrise, which was translated into English by Elisabeth Jaquette. Her main characters in Green Flash are Ahmad and Nur, two Sudanese students in Cairo who are suffering from racism and injustice. According to literary critic Xavier Luffin, their discussions deal with themes worrying "their generation, such as the lack of freedom, the civil war, identity, racism, and unemployment."

Several of Mamoun's stories have appeared in English translation, for example in the anthologies The Book of Khartoum (Comma Press, 2016) and Banthology (Comma Press, 2018), as well as in Banipal magazine. The French anthology Nouvelles du Soudan (2010) included her story Histoires de portes (Stories of Doors).

In 2009, Mamoun was the recipient of an AFAC (Arab Fund for Arts and Culture) grant, and the following year, she was selected to participate in the second IPAF Nadwa, an annual workshop for young writers of Arabic literature. In his 2019 article about the Top 10 Books about Sudan in The Guardian, Sudanese-born writer Jamal Mahjoub characterised Mamoun's stories about everyday life in modern Khartoum as "prone to experimentation".

Commenting on Mamoun's 2023 collection of poems Something Evergreen Called Life, translated by British-Syrian writer Yasmine Seale, poet Divya Victor wrote:

Locked out of her country after the Sudanese revolution and locked down in the United States during the early and most devastating phase of the global pandemic, Rania Mamoun speaks to us from the ledge of fear and unceasing uncertainty caused by genocidal and femicidal patriarchy. Yasmine Seale’s exquisite, crystalline translations of these poems sing out from the soundless cavern of vertiginous depression born from the loss of country, the loss of countless loved ones, and the loss of one’s own body: “a stray cat circling / her bearings lost/ forgotten/ like a margin in a book” […] “I am drowning/ without getting wet.”

— Divya Victor, On Rania Mamoun's "Something Evergreen Called Life"

Something Evergreen Called Life was selected by Brittle paper literary magazine as one of the 100 Notable African Books of 2023.

== Works ==
- Green Flash, 2006
- Son of the Sun, 2013
- Thirteen Months of Sunrise, short stories, translated by Elisabeth Jaquette, 2019
- Something Evergreen Called Life, poems, translated by Yasmine Seale, 2023

== See also ==
- Sudanese literature
- List of Sudanese writers
- Modern Arabic literature
