= Donia Maher =

Egyptian actress, writer and artist

- Born: 14 November 1979 (age 46); Cairo, Egypt
- Occupations: Actress, writer

Donia Maher (Arabic: دنيا ماهر; born 14 November 1979) is an Egyptian actress, writer and artist.

== Biography ==
She was born in Cairo. After studying acting, she appeared in several theatre and film productions, culminating with her breakthrough role in Hala Lotfy's film Al Khorug lel Nahar (2012) which was screened in film festivals around the world. She was also praised for her role in the TV series Segn El Nesa (Women’s Prison).

More recently, Maher has gained renown for her graphic novel The Apartment in Bab El-Louk, created in collaboration with the illustrators Ganzeer and Ahmad Nady. The English translation by Elisabeth Jaquette was nominated for the Banipal Prize.

Donia Maher lives in Cairo.
