= The Queue (Abdel Aziz novel) =

2013 satire novel by Basma Abdel Aziz

- First edition (Arabic)
- Author: Basma Abdel Aziz
- Original title: Al-Tabour
- Translator: Elisabeth Jaquette
- Language: Arabic
- Genre: Satire; Absurdist fiction
- Set in: Middle East
- Publisher: Dar Al-Tanweer (Arabic); Melville House Publishing (English)
- Publication date: 2013
- Publication place: Egypt
- English publication date: 24 May 2016
- Pages: 224 (Kindle edition)

The Queue (Arabic: الطابور, romanized: Al-Tabuur) is a 2013 satire novel by Basma Abdel Aziz. It was first published in English in 2016. The novel explores totalitarianism and bureaucracy through the lens of a fictional Middle Eastern state and the people under its control.

== Plot ==
In an unnamed Middle Eastern city, a building known as the Gate controls the populace by making decrees and requiring inordinate amounts of paperwork which must be directly processed by the Gate itself. Dr. Tarek examines a patient named Yehya, who was shot by government forces in a riot known as the Disgraceful Events. The Gate begins a propaganda campaign to rewrite the history of the Events, denying that anyone was shot at all. The Gate decrees that is illegal to remove a bullet without a permit. It also confiscates all X-Rays within the city, removing all evidence of government-sponsored violence. After the Events, the Gate remains closed. Thousands of people stand outside in the titular queue, awaiting the Gate's opening so that their paperwork can be correctly processed. Over the course of 140 days, Yehya's condition worsens and various other members of the queue struggle to survive as the Gate remains closed. Eventually, Tarek decides to break the law and remove the bullet without a permit, only to learn that Yehya has died of his injuries.

== Themes ==
The Queue explores totalitarian society through the lens of fiction. The novel has been compared to works of absurdist literature and magical realism, which are often inspired by persecution. It explores the response to the Arab Spring by satirizing the government's dehumanization of its citizens, contrasting governmental power with grassroots dissenters. The novel also explores how history is written and distorted by the government propaganda to control citizens' reactions. In Egypt, fake news, forged documents, and the intimidation of healthcare workers have been used as government tactics to exert control over the populace. All of these acts take place within the novel, which presents them with a straight-laced tone rather than as a caricature. The Queue also explores how various social institutions interact to uphold power. In the novel, religious leaders work to uphold the power of the Gate by proclaiming that bullet wounds come from God. Those leaders also work to uphold corrupt corporations which increases government control through surveillance. Patriarchal social practice also serves to prevent female characters from dissenting.

== Style ==
According to a reviewer from NPR, The Queue echoes many other novels. It references the novel of the same name by Vladimir Sorokin, which parodies Russian bureaucracy. It also mirrors The Trial by Franz Kafka and Brave New World by Aldous Huxley in its portrayal of bureaucracy and governmental control. The novel has been categorized as "the newest in this genre of totalitarian absurdity". The novel uses coded language, which gives the author a measure of cover to discuss real-life events in a way that might not otherwise be permitted.

== Background ==
Abdel Aziz began writing the novel in September 2012, about 3 months after the Muslim Brotherhood took power during the Egyptian Crisis. Abdel Aziz was inspired by a specific event in which she saw a large line of people waiting outside of a closed government office. Two hours later she passed by the same line, noting that the office was still closed and that the people had not moved. She chose not to set her novel in a particular city because "a totalitarian regime ... could be based in any place, and I wanted to express this in universal terms."

Abdel Aziz counts 1984 and Animal Farm by George Orwell, as well as books by Franz Kafka, among her literary influences.

== Reception ==
The novel received positive reviews. An NPR reviewer described the novel as "an effective critique of authoritarianism". Publishers Weekly stated that "at its best, the novel captures a sense of futility and meaninglessness" and found it to be a fitting metaphor for the plight of Egypt after the Arab Spring. However, the same review criticized the novel's pacing.
