= Sabah Qabbani =

Syrian ambassador (1928–2015)

Sabah Qabbani صباح قبّاني
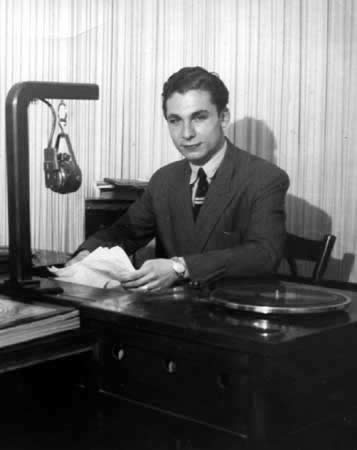

5th Ambassador of Syria to the United States
- In office 1974–1981
- Preceded by: Omar Abu-Riche
- Succeeded by: Rafic Jouejati

Personal details
- Born: 5 June 1928 Damascus, Syria
- Died: 1 January 2015 (aged 86) Damascus, Syria
- Relations: Nizar Qabbani (brother)
- Children: Rana Kabbani, Karma Kabbani
- Education: Paris-Sorbonne University
- Profession: Politician, Writer

Sabah Qabbani (Arabic: صباح قبّاني; June 5, 1928 – January 1, 2015) was appointed ambassador of Syria to the United States by President Hafez al-Assad in 1974. The post had been vacant since 1967 when diplomatic relations between Syria and the United States were severed following the 1967 Arab-Israeli war. Prior to his posting in Washington, D.C. he was Syria's envoy to Indonesia and Syria's consul in New York.

== Background ==
Qabbani received a degree in law from Damascus University in 1949 and a PhD in International Law from Paris-Sorbonne University in Paris in 1952. After returning to Syria, he joined the Ministry of Culture and became director of the Syrian Radio programs in 1953. He helped promote Arab stars such as Abdel Halim Hafez and Doreid Lahham. Then on July 23, 1960, Qabbani became the director of Syrian Television during the Egyptian-Syrian union. In 1962, Qabbani joined the Ministry of Foreign affairs and became Syria's consul in New York. After returning to Syria in 1966, he became director of press and media at the Ministry of Foreign Affairs. He remained at his post until becoming Syria's envoy to Indonesia in 1968. In 1973, Qabbani returned to Syria and became director of the US desk at the Ministry of Foreign Affairs. He was later appointed ambassador to the United States from 1974 until 1980. After the completion of his post, Qabbani returned to Syria and resumed his activities as director of the US desk at the foreign ministry until 1982. Upon Qabbani's retirement from the Foreign Ministry in 1982, he began devoting his time to writing and photography.

== Personal life ==
Qabbani was born in the Syrian capital of Damascus to a middle class merchant family. He was raised in Mi'thnah Al-Shahm, one of the neighborhoods of old Damascus. Sabah Qabbani's father, Tawfiq Qabbani was a prominent merchant and a member of the National Bloc during the Syrian Mandate years.

In 1956, he was married to Maha Naamani, the niece of Said al-Ghazzi, former Prime Minister of Syria. His brother is the Syrian poet Nizar Qabbani. Sabah Qabbani's daughter is the writer Rana Kabbani and thus he is the grandfather of her daughter Yasmine Seale. Qabbani's great uncle, Abu Khalil Qabbani, was one of the leading innovators in Arab dramatic literature.

Qabbani died on January 1, 2015, at the age of 86.
