= Joanna Poulton =

British medical researcher

Joanna (Jo) Poulton
- Occupation: Professor of mitochondrial genetics
- Parent: E. C. Poulton (father)

Academic background
- Education: Lady Margaret Hall, Oxford

Academic work
- Discipline: Medicine, genetics
- Sub-discipline: Mitochondrial diseases
- Institutions: University of Oxford

Joanna Poulton is a British medical researcher, and Professor of Mitochondrial Genetics at the University of Oxford. She is an honorary consultant in Oxford, where she works on diseases caused by mutations in mitochondrial DNA. Such mutations are associated with many diseases, including diabetes, organ failure, deafness, and blindness, and are also important in neurodegeneration and aging. Poulton has spoken up on behalf of women in academia, as well as on the effects of neurodiversity on women's careers.

== Education and career ==
Poulton is the daughter of the physician and psychologist E. C. Poulton. Her mother, one of the earliest women to study medicine at the University of Cambridge, gained her MD at the age of 90. Poulton credits her parents for having taught her and her siblings a scientific attitude and critical thinking. In 1976, Poulton gained a BA in physiological sciences at Lady Margaret Hall, University of Oxford, followed by a Bachelor of Medicine and Bachelor of Surgery in 1979. She became a Member of the Royal College of Physicians, London, in 1982. She was awarded a doctorate in medicine at Oxford in 1991. In 1997, she became a Fellow of the Royal College of Paediatrics and Child Health, London, and in 2013 was made a Fellow of the Royal College of Physicians, London.

Poulton is the author or co-author of over three hundred scientific publications, and her research has been key in the field of mitochondrial genetics. Well into her 50s, Poulton was diagnosed with ADHD, Attention Deficit Hyperactivity Disorder. She sought the diagnosis to help explain her perceived disorganisation and relative lack of success in gaining research grants. Poulton has referred to the glass ceiling encountered by professional women, and to the difficulties experienced by women academics in general in fields dominated by men. She has been active in supporting female colleagues and students and is arguably one of very few Oxford professors who has publicised her ADHD diagnosis.

== Research ==
Poulton's research has focused on mitochondrial genetics and mitochondrial disease. Mitochondria are cellular organelles involved in energy metabolism in living organisms. They carry a small amount of DNA, known as mitochondrial DNA. Mutations in mitochondrial DNA are inherited from the mother, i.e. they are passed on through the female line. In cases where a mitochondrial mutation has occurred, a patient will carry a mixture of the mutated, damaged DNA, and the normal DNA, in varying proportions in different cells (a phenomenon known as heteroplasmy); the severity of the resulting disease will depend on this proportion. Poulton's data helped demonstrate the existence of a genetic bottleneck during the transmission of mitochondrial DNA from one generation to another. Her findings helped pave the way for improvements in methods to address mitochondrial disease, including the three-parent-baby approach. More recently, Poulton has addressed potential therapies to alleviate the severity of some mitochondrial diseases.

Poulton has authored or coauthored approximately 300 journal articles and reviews on a range of subjects mostly focused on medical and genetic aspects of mitochondrial disease. Additionally, both in her working life and writings she has addressed the societal aspects of clinical practice and medical research, notably tailoring medical education in a multicultural society. In an article with Iain McLean, she contrasted the UK system of voluntary blood donations with the US system of paying blood suppliers, and commented on the tragic consequences of the latter on the spread of AIDS and other blood-borne diseases. Poulton has also written on the controversial Mitochondrial Eve hypothesis of human evolution, which was based on the variation in the mitochondrial DNA of populations in different continents.

== Selected publications ==
- Poulton, J.; Deadman, M. E.; Gardiner, R. M. (4 February 1989). "Duplications of mitochondrial DNA in mitochondrial myopathy". The Lancet. 1 (8632): 236–240. doi:10.1016/s0140-6736(89)91256-7. ISSN 0140-6736. PMID 2563411.
- Poulton, J.; Deadman, M. E.; Bindoff, L.; Morten, K.; Land, J.; Brown, G. (January 1993). "Families of mtDNA re-arrangements can be detected in patients with mtDNA deletions: duplications may be a transient intermediate form". Human Molecular Genetics. 2 (1): 23–30. doi:10.1093/hmg/2.1.23. ISSN 0964-6906. PMID 8490619.
- Poulton, Joanna; Morten, Karl (July 1993). "Noninvasive diagnosis of the MELAS syndrome from blood DNA". Annals of Neurology. 34 (1): 116. doi:10.1002/ana.410340124. ISSN 0364-5134. PMID 8517674.
- Marchington, D. R.; Hartshorne, G. M.; Barlow, D.; Poulton, J. (February 1997). "Homopolymeric tract heteroplasmy in mtDNA from tissues and single oocytes: support for a genetic bottleneck". American Journal of Human Genetics. 60 (2): 408–416. ISSN 0002-9297. PMC 1712400. PMID 9012414.
- Marchington, D. R.; Barlow, D.; Poulton, J. (August 1999). "Transmitochondrial mice carrying resistance to chloramphenicol on mitochondrial DNA: developing the first mouse model of mitochondrial DNA disease". Nature Medicine. 5 (8): 957–960. doi:10.1038/11403. ISSN 1078-8956. PMID 10426324.
- Poulton, Joanna; Luan, Jian'an; Macaulay, Vincent; Hennings, Susie; Mitchell, Jo; Wareham, Nicholas J. (15 June 2002). "Type 2 diabetes is associated with a common mitochondrial variant: evidence from a population-based case-control study". Human Molecular Genetics. 11 (13): 1581–1583. doi:10.1093/hmg/11.13.1581. ISSN 0964-6906. PMID 12045211.
- Ashley, Neil; Poulton, Joanna (January 2009). "Mitochondrial DNA is a direct target of anti-cancer anthracycline drugs". Biochemical and Biophysical Research Communications. 378 (3): 450–455. Bibcode:2009BBRC..378..450A. doi:10.1016/j.bbrc.2008.11.059. ISSN 0006-291X. PMID 19032935.
- Liao, Chunyan; Ashley, Neil; Diot, Alan; Morten, Karl; Phadwal, Kanchan; Williams, Andrew; Fearnley, Ian; Rosser, Lyndon; Lowndes, Jo; Fratter, Carl; Ferguson, David J. P.; Vay, Laura; Quaghebeur, Gerardine; Moroni, Isabella; Bianchi, Stefania (10 January 2017). "Dysregulated mitophagy and mitochondrial organization in optic atrophy due to OPA1 mutations". Neurology. 88 (2): 131–142. doi:10.1212/WNL.0000000000003491. ISSN 1526-632X. PMC 5224718. PMID 27974645.
- Poulton, Joanna; Steffann, Julie; Burgstaller, Joerg; McFarland, Robert (September 2019). "243rd ENMC international workshop: Developing guidelines for management of reproductive options for families with maternally inherited mtDNA disease, Amsterdam, the Netherlands, 22–24 March 2019". Neuromuscular Disorders. 29 (9): 725–733. doi:10.1016/j.nmd.2019.08.004. PMID 31501000.
- Dombi, Eszter; Marinaki, Tony; Spingardi, Paolo; Millar, Val; Hadjichristou, Nastasia; Carver, Janet; Johnston, Iain G.; Fratter, Carl; Poulton, Joanna (2 April 2024). "Nucleoside supplements as treatments for mitochondrial DNA depletion syndrome". Frontiers in Cell and Developmental Biology. 12 1260496. doi:10.3389/fcell.2024.1260496. ISSN 2296-634X. PMC 11043827. PMID 38665433.
