= Thea Porter =

British fashion designer (1927–2000)

Thea Porter, photographed by Joe Gaffney in 1973.

Dorothea Noelle Naomi "Thea" Porter (24 December 1927 – 24 July 2000) was a British artist, fashion designer and retailer who in the 1960s brought opulent Middle East fashions to London.

== Early life ==
She was born Dorothea Noelle Naomi Seale, on 24 December 1927, in Jerusalem, and raised in Damascus. She was the daughter of Morris S. Seale, the Arabist and theologian, who was a Christian missionary in Syria, and his French wife, who was also a missionary. Her brother was the journalist Patrick Seale, and her sister Barbara "Bobbie" Seale married the yacht designer Beecher Moore.

Porter was educated at the Lycée Français in Damascus, Fernhill Manor, then for a short time studying French and Old English at Royal Holloway College, London, before being expelled.

Following her studies in England, she worked in the library of the British embassy in Beirut, where she met her future husband, Robert Porter. Together they travelled to Jordan and Iran, and had holidays in France and Italy. She studied painting during the day, and "went to nightclubs every night and had millions of clothes." In June 1961 Porter had her first solo painting exhibition at the Alecco Saab Gallery, Beirut.

== Career ==
After she separated from her husband, Porter moved to London in May 1964. Her first job was in interior design, working for Elizabeth Eaton. She opened her first shop, an interior decorating business offering imported cushions, fabrics and hangings called Thea Porter Decorations Ltd, in Soho at 8 Greek Street on 27 July 1966. She realised that rather than just cutting up her imported kaftans to use the fabric for cushion covers, they were fashionable in their own right, and began making up her own in mixed fabrics and antique trimmings.

From 1967, she expanded internationally; her first wholesale client was Henri Bendel in New York in 1968.

Her customers, some of whom also became her friends, included Baby Jane Holzer, Lauren Bacall, Talitha Getty, Bianca Jagger, Mick Jagger, Inaara Aga Khan, Jutta Laing (the wife of R D Laing), Pamela, Lady Harlech, Veronique Peck, Princess Margaret, Edna O'Brien, Sharon Tate, Elizabeth Taylor, and Pete Townshend.

In 1971, Porter opened a store in New York financed by Michael Butler, the producer of the hit Broadway musical Hair. It closed after six months, but she continued to sell very successfully at high-end boutiques across the United States; Giorgio Beverly Hills sold approximately $300,000 worth of Thea Porter designs per year in the mid-1970s. On 1 April 1977 she opened a store in Paris, on the Rue de Tournon; this closed in 1979. Thea Porter Decorations Ltd went into receivership in February 1981; she subsequently worked from ateliers on Avery Row and Beauchamp Place. In 1986 Porter had a short business partnership with Princess Dina of Jordan in a smaller shop, Arabesque, on Motcomb Street. Zandra Rhodes has stated, "Sadly, one didn't hear of her after that". In her obituary, The Guardian noted that Porter had little interest in marketing and was generally poor at business.

== Personal life ==
In 1952, she married Robert "Bob" Porter, an economist with the British Embassy in Beirut. They divorced in 1964 or 1967. They had one daughter, Venetia.

In 1994 she was diagnosed with Alzheimer's disease and died in London on 24 July 2000.
