= Morris S. Seale =

- Born: Morris Sigel Seale; 14 July 1896; Jerusalem. Ottoman Empire
- Died: 29 August 1993 (aged 97); Limasol, Cyprus
- Education: Queen's University of Belfast
- Occupations: Arabist, Theologist

Morris Sigel Seale (14 July 1896 – 29 August 1993) was a Jewish born scholar and theologian who wrote about Jewish, Christian and Muslim traditions and explored extensively the links between the religions. He wrote three influential books and contributed numerous articles to Theological journals including the Journal of Biblical Literature and The Muslim World.

He studied theology at Queen's University of Belfast and served on an Irish Presbyterian mission in Damascus, having converted from Judaism.

His son Patrick Seale was a British journalist and author who specialised in the Middle East. One of his daughters was the fashion designer Thea Porter and the other, Barbara, was married to yachtsman and restaurateur Beecher Moore.

== Bibliography ==
- Muslim Theology: A Study of Origins with Reference to the Church Fathers (London: Luzac 1964)
- Desert Bible: Nomadic Tribal Culture and Old Testament Interpretation (London: Weidenfeld and Nicolson 1974: ISBN 0-297-76683-X)
- Qur'an and Bible: studies in interpretation and dialogue (London: Croom Helm 1978: ISBN 0-85664-818-3)
