= Abdu al-Hamuli =

Egyptian musician

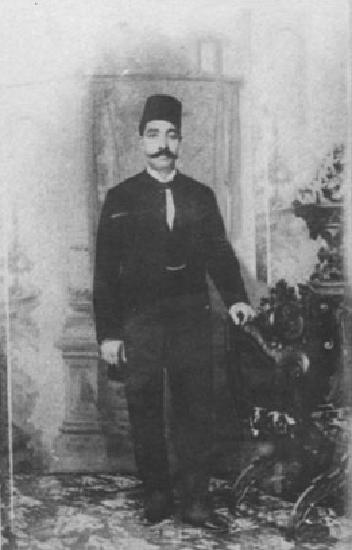
Abdu al-Hamuli

Abdu al-Hamuli (Arabic: عبده الحامولي; October 5, 1836 – May 12, 1901) was an Egyptian singer and musician. He was married to the Egyptian singer Sokaina, who was known by the name of Almaz. Together, they formed a well-known musical duo.

== Life and career ==
Al-Hamuli was born in Tanta. He went to Cairo to study Arabic classical music and various Arabic instruments and founded an orchestra there. The Khedive Ismail was fond of al-Hamuli's music and invited him to perform on official occasions.

After visiting Turkey, he developed a musical style that blended Egyptian and Ottoman influences and gained popularity among both Egyptian and Turkish audiences.

He exerted great influence on the development of Arabic music, especially on its vocal forms. This was evident in the treatment of the Arabic maqam and the free improvisation between the individual sections of a song.

In January 1895, Abdu al-Hamuli worked with Syrian theatre director Ahmad Abu Khalil al-Qabbani on theatrical productions presented by the Qabbani troupe at the Cairo Opera House. The event is regarded as the first occasion on which an Arab singer performed at an opera house. His reputation was so influential that the poet Ahmad Shawqi composed an elegy in his honor after his death, reflecting his importance in Egypt's musical history.

The relationship between Almaz and Abdu al-Hamuli was dramatized in the 1962 Egyptian musical film Almaz wa Abdu al-Hamuli, starring Warda Al-Jazairia as Almaz and Adel Mamoun as Abdu al-Hamuli.

== See also ==
- Music of Egypt - Modern Egyptian classical and pop music
