= Abdallah Abbas Al-Iryani =

Yemeni novelist and writer

Abdallah Abbas Al-Iryani (Arabic: عبدالله عباس الإرياني) is a Yemeni novelist and writer. He studied at Cairo University, obtaining a degree in civil engineering in 1984. He has devoted himself more seriously to literature since 2005. He has published several novels and short story collections as well as a play. His work has been translated into Italian and was included in a 2009 anthology on Yemeni literature called Perle dello Yemen.

== Works ==
- Bi-dūn malal : riwāyah (2006), novel
- al-Ṣuʻūd ilá Nāfiʻ : riwāyah (2007), novel
- Al-ghurm (2008), novel
- Dijlat al-shahīd : masraḥīyah (2007), play
- Ḥikāyah kull khamīs : qiṣaṣ (2006), short stories
- al-Zāriqah : qiṣaṣ qaṣīrah (2007), short stories
- Saydat al-nahraen (2008), play
- Sayf al-ʻuqdah, sayf al-ḥall : masraḥīyah (2009), play
- Māʼat ʻām min al-fawḍá : riwāyah (2009), novel
- Ḥadīth kulla yawm : qiṣaṣ (2011), short stories
