= Tom Poulton =

British artist (1897–1963)

- Born: Thomas Leycester Poulton; 3 February 1897; Wimbledon, London, England
- Died: 1 April 1963 (aged 66); United Kingdom
- Occupations: Illustrator and artist

Thomas Leycester Poulton (1897–1963) was a British magazine and medical illustrator who provided artwork for a range of publications including the British Journal of Surgery and The Radio Times. After his death it was discovered that he had also secretly produced hundreds of sketches and finished drawings of men and women engaged in a wide range of uninhibited sexual activity. In the 1990s and 2000s many of these were collected and made available to the public by publishing houses specialising in erotic art.

== Early life ==
Poulton was born in Wimbledon on 3 February 1897. His father, Thomas Hill Mortimer Poulton (a civil servant), died in 1899 when Tom was 2. Tom was educated at Monkton Combe School (Junior School and Senior School), outside Bath in Somerset. In 1914 he won a scholarship to Slade School of Fine Art in Bloomsbury, Central London where he was taught by renowned artist and teacher Henry Tonks. At the Slade he met student Edith Kibblewhite whom he married in 1923 and with whom he had children (Alethea in 1924, Celia in 1927). Edith later became known as the acclaimed lutenist Diana Poulton.

== Career ==
Poulton was commissioned to produce artwork for many magazines and books including, for Nonesuch Press, new versions of A Plurality of Worlds by Fontenelle and Isaac Walton's The Compleat Angler. He worked almost entirely with a soft pencil but occasionally used pen and ink.

The 1939 Register of England & Wales shows Poulton and his wife Edith living in Heyshott in Surrey. He describes himself as a 'black and white artist and art teacher' and also gives his First World War service as a Lieutenant in the special reserve of the Royal Artillery (demobbed in 1920).

For a time he was employed as a cartographer for the Ministry of Defence.

== Personal life and erotica ==
Whilst stationed in Khajuraho, India, Poulton came into contact with the Kama Sutra, which prompted a fascination with erotic art. [reference required] During his lifetime he produced many erotic drawings, usually on commission from various patrons, notably playboy yachtsman Beecher Moore, who sold a large collection of Poulton's work in the early 1990s.[reference required] His erotica is very much of its time; the clothing is very clearly from the 1940s and 50s and the pictures are characterised by an exuberance and joie de vivre on the part of the participants which arguably sets him apart from many other artists in the genre.

Throughout his life he kept all of his erotic work secret for fear that it would be seized and he would be arrested by the police.[reference required]

He lived in Soho, London, for many years and was a member of the Double Crown Club. In later life he lived at 13 Handel Mansions in Holborn, Camden.[reference required]

== Bibliography ==
- Maclean, Jamie, The Secret Art of an English Gentleman: Tom Poulton (Cologne: Taschen, 2006, ISBN 3-8228-3062-3)
- Poulton, Tom, An artists secret sketchbook (London: The Erotic Print Society, 1999, ISBN 1-898998-11-6)
- Maclean, Jamie, Tom Poulton: The Lost Drawings (London: The Erotic Print Society, 2000, ISBN 978-1-898998-23-5)
