= Rana Kabbani =

British Syrian cultural historian, writer and broadcaster

- رنا قباني
- Born: 1958 (age 67–68); Damascus, Syria
- Notable work: Imperial Fictions: Europe's Myths of the Orient; Letter to Christendom
- Spouse(s): Mahmoud Darwish (divorced 1982); Patrick Seale
- Father: Sabah Qabbani

Rana Kabbani (Arabic: رنا قباني; born 1958) is a British Syrian cultural historian, writer and broadcaster. Most famous for her works Imperial Fictions: Europe's Myths of the Orient (1994) and Letter to Christendom (1989), she has also edited and translated works in Arabic and English. She has written for Spare Rib, the International Herald Tribune, The New Statesman, The Guardian, British Vogue, The Independent, Al Quds al Arabi, and Islamica. She has made and contributed to many television and radio programmes for the BBC, on subjects such as literature, music, minority rights, Islamic culture, food, feminism, women's rights, painting, and British politics. She has spoken out against Islamophobia, defining its historic roots in colonialism. Her famous relatives include Abu Khalil Qabbani, her uncle Nizar Qabbani, her father Sabah Qabbani, and her daughter Yasmine Seale whose father is Patrick Seale.

== Education and personal life ==
Born in 1958 in Damascus, to Sabah Qabbani, her paternal uncle was the renowned poet Nizar Qabbani. Her maternal family was also from a distinguished background: Kabbani's mother, Maha, was the niece of Said al-Ghazzi, former Prime Minister of Syria. In particular, Kabbani was influenced by her maternal grandmother Salwa Ghazzi, suffragette and pioneering feminist from a landowning liberal educated patrician family.

Kabbani spent her childhood and young adulthood in New York City, Damascus, Jakarta and Washington DC, where her father held a career as a diplomat and Syrian ambassador. She received her BA degree from Georgetown University, her MA degree from the American University of Beirut, and her Ph.D. in English from Jesus College, Cambridge. Her teachers there were Raymond Williams, Frank Kermode, and Lisa Jardine.

As the granddaughter of the Syrian Independence hero Tawfiq Kabbani, and the niece of the Syrian poet Nizar Kabbani, Rana Kabbani had both literature and activism in her blood from a young age. In the way that Nizar Kabbani's feminism was inspired by the life and death of his sister, Kabbani's role as a progressive voice against imperialism was inspired by her experiences with growing anti-Muslim sentiment, her historical research and her family's contribution. Her great uncle Fawzi Ghazzi wrote the first Syrian Constitution - taught as a document of pioneering liberalism - but was assassinated by agents of French colonialism for not accepting to mention their Mandate in Syria in it.

Kabbani married Palestinian poet Mahmoud Darwish twice - in 1976 and then again in 1978. They lived together in Beirut during the civil war; in Paris, and in Sidi Bou Said in Tunisia. They had no children together and divorced in 1982. In 1985, she married the British journalist Patrick Seale, and they had two children, Alexander and Yasmine Seale.

== Writing career ==
Kabbani began writing at an early age. She worked as an art critic in Paris, and later moved to London to work as a publisher's editor. Her first book, Europe's Myths of Orient: Devise and Rule, was published in 1985. In it, she evaluated orientalist perspectives and narratives, specifically focusing on erotic stereotypes and sexualization of the "exotic" in literature and painting. The work was translated into Arabic, Dutch, German, and Turkish. It is taught at universities, and has never been out of print.

After the publication of Salman Rushdie's The Satanic Verses, there was a rise in anti-Muslim sentiment, which prompted Kabbani to write Letter to Christendom in 1989.

Kabbani's other works include her translations from the Arabic of Mahmoud Darweesh's 'Sand and Other Poems' (1985) and her editorship of The Passionate Nomad: Diaries of Isabelle Eberhardt (1987).

Kabbani has written for The Independent, The International Herald Tribune, The New Statesman, British Vogue, and The Guardian. In 2011, she wrote about Syria in articles such as "Can Syrians Dare to Hope?" She is active on Twitter, which has led to controversy, as she is of a radical stance and uses brash language, in order to highlight political and social issues. She has been a fund raiser and a spokesperson for British charities that raise money for Syrian refugees, as well as for autism and mental illness. She is trilingual in Arabic, French and English, and has travelled extensively in Southeast Asia, Eastern Europe, Central Asia, Russia, the United States, Canada, Western Europe and Latin America.

== Court proceedings ==
On 27 March 2026, the Court of Appeal dismissed a challenge by Dr Rana Kabbani Seale against her conviction for contempt of court.

The court found her in contempt for the following reasons:

- Persistent Breaches: She committed 27 breaches of a court order issued in 2023.
- Abusive Correspondence: The breaches involved "bombarding" the court and specific judges with offensive correspondence.
- Unfounded Allegations: She made "fanciful allegations" of criminality, conspiracy, corruption, and bias against the judiciary because she disagreed with their decisions.
- High Culpability: Many of these breaches occurred even after she received a formal warning from the Solicitor General. The judge noted she appeared "unrepentant" and viewed her actions as a personal right regardless of court orders.
- Sentencing and Appeal: As a result of these findings, she was given a six-month prison sentence, which was suspended for two years. Her recent appeal sought to overturn this conviction, but the Court of Appeal upheld the original order and sanction.

=== Background and contempt finding ===
The original finding of contempt was made by Mr Justice Rajah in July 2025. The case arose from long-running probate litigation involving Kabbani Seale, her children, and stepchildren and her son Alexander.

Alexander Seale (born c. 1987) is the son of Dr Rana Kabbani and the late Patrick Seale. He is a journalist and broadcaster based in London, specialising in French and European politics for outlets such as The Independent and TRT World.

In the context of the legal proceedings, the following further details have emerged:

- Legal Standing: Unlike his mother, who was at one point excluded from the proceedings due to procedural errors, Alexander's defence and counterclaim remained active. A court ruling in May 2021 dismissed an application by his siblings to strike out his case, allowing him to proceed to a full trial.
- Joint Ownership Dispute: Alexander and his mother jointly argued that his father, Patrick Seale, was under "undue influence" when he severed the joint tenancy of their £3.5 million family home in St Anns Villas shortly before his death in 2014. They contend that this severance, which reduced Dr Kabbani's share, should be overturned.
- Vulnerability: Dr Kabbani has consistently described Alexander as a vulnerable person with disabilities. She has used his health status as a central argument in her correspondence with the court, claiming the litigation by his siblings—Orlando, Delilah, and Yasmine—is "cruel" and harmful to his well-being.

== Works ==
- Europe's Myths of Orient: Devise and Rule, London: Pandora, 1986. ISBN 9780863582295, OCLC 70785782
- Women in Muslim society, University College, Cork. Department of Sociology. 1992. OCLC 877240672
- Letter to Christendom, London: Virago, cop. 1989. ISBN 9781853811197, OCLC 491449858
