= Taissier Khalaf =

Syrian-Palestinian novelist, critic and researcher

- Born: Taissier Ahmad Khalaf; 1967 (age 58–59); Quneitra, Syria
- Education: University of Damascus
- Occupations: Novelist; Researcher
- Known for: Historical Researcher about Levant and Arabia

Taissier Ahmad Khalaf (also written Taysir Khalaf), (Arabic: تيسير أحمد خلف, born in Quneitra 1967), is a Syrian-Palestinian novelist, critic and researcher. He has written over 50 books including his novels The Slaughter of the Philosophers and The Andalusian Messiah that were both nominated for the International Prize for Arabic Fiction.

== Career ==
Khalaf studied media and graduated from the University of Damascus in 1993. He started writing novels and joined the Arab Writers Union. He was also interested in historic research and produced several works focusing on Arab history, the Levant and especially Palestine. His historical research works include an edition of Mawāniḥ al-uns bi-riḥlatī li-Wādī al-Quds by 18th century traveler Al-Luqaimi, which describes Jerusalem under Ottoman rule; a history of the Golan Heights based on the writings of Arab historians, and a research regarding the authenticity of Abu Khalil Qabbani's journey to the United States in the late 19th century.

In literature, Khalaf utilized historical events in many of his novels; The Slaughter of the Philosophers, which was nominated for the International Prize for Arabic Fiction, has the Roman conquest of Palmyra and the life of Queen Zenobia in Rome as a background for the protagonist, but the novel focuses more on the philosophical life of Palmyra rather than the political history. His 2024 novel The Andalusian Messiah takes place in 16th-century al-Andalus after the Christian reconquista, when Muslims were forcibly converted to Christianity. It was nominated for the 2025 International Prize for Arabic Fiction.

As of 2017, Khalf resides in Dubai.

== Selected publications ==
=== Short story ===
- Khalaf, Taissier (1993). Qiṭaṭ Ukhrá: Qiṣaṣ (Other Cats: Stories) (in Arabic). Dār al-Yanābīʻ lil-Nashr wa-al-Tawzīʻ. OCLC 31132230.

=== Novels ===
- Khalaf, Taissier (1996). Dafātir al-Kutuf al-Māʼilah (Notebooks of Sliding Shoulder) (in Arabic). Dār al-Yanābīʻ. OCLC 35578519.
- Khalaf, Taissier (2004). ʻAjūz al-Buḥayrah (The Lake's Old Man) (in Arabic). Dār Kanʻān. OCLC 61671599.
- Khalaf, Taissier (2013). Moviola (in Arabic). Dār Faḍāʼāt lil-Nashr wa-al-Tawzīʻ wa-al-Ṭibāʻah.
- Khalaf, Taissier (2016). Madhbaḥat al-Falāsifah (The Slaughter of the Philosophers) (in Arabic). al-Muʼassasah al-ʻArabīyah lil-Dirāsāt wa-al-Nashr. OCLC 945115504.
- Khalaf, Taissier (2018). 'Aṣafīr Darwin (The Birds of Darwin) (in Arabic). al-Muʼassasah al-ʻArabīyah lil-Dirāsāt wa-al-Nashr. ISBN 978-614-419-869-8.
- Khalaf, Taissier (2022). Malek al-Lusus: Lafa'ef Yunos al-Suri (King of Thieves: the Scrolls of the Syrian Eunus) (in Arabic). Almutawassit. ISBN 979-1-280-73833-2.
- Khalaf, Taissier (2024). Almaseh al-Andalwse (The Andalusian Messiah) (in Arabic). Almutawassit. ISBN 979-1-255-91036-7.

=== Historical research ===
- Khalaf, Taissier (2004). Ṣūrat al-Jūlān fī al-Turāth al-Jughrāfī al-ʻArabī-al-Islāmī (The Image of the Golan in the Arab-Islamic Geographical Tradition) (in Arabic). Qadmus lil-Nashr wa-al-Tawzīʻ. OCLC 609010203.
- Khalaf, Taissier (2005). al-Jūlān fī Maṣādir al-Tārīkh al-ʻArabī: Ḥawliyāt wa-Tarājum (The Golan in the Sources of Arab History: Annals and Biographies) (in Arabic). Dār Kanʻān. OCLC 74716561.
- Khalaf, Taissier (2006). al-Kitāb al-ʻAzīzī (The Azizi Book) (in Arabic). al-Takwīn lil-Ṭibāʻah wa-al-Nashr wa-al-Tawzīʻ. OCLC 66387271.
- Khalaf, Taissier (2006). Istikshāf al-Jūlān: Mughāmirūn wa-Jawāsīs wa-Qasāwisah, 1805-1880 (Exploring the Golan: Adventurers, Spies and Pastors, 1805-1880) (in Arabic). al-Takwīn lil-Ṭibāʻah wa-al-Nashr wa-al-Tawzīʻ. OCLC 84850853.
- Khalaf, Taissier (2006). Wathāiʼq Uʻthmānīyah Ḥawla al-Jawlān: Awqāf - Awāmir Sulṭānīyah - Sālnāmāt (Ottoman Documents Regarding the Golan: Endowments - Sultanic Edicts- Salname) (in Arabic). al-Takwīn lil-Ṭibāʻah wa-al-Nashr wa-al-Tawzīʻ. OCLC 123450141.
- Khalaf, Taissier (2006). al-Masīḥ fī al-Jūlān : Tārīkh wa-Athār (Christ in the Golan: History and Traces) (in Arabic). Dār Kanʻān. OCLC 191877963.
- Khalaf, Taissier (2007). Rujm al-Hirī wa-Ḥaḍārat al-Dawāʼir al-Ghāmiḍah (Rujm el-Hiri and the Culture of the Mysterious Circles (in Arabic). Tanfīdh wa-tawzīʻ al-Takwīn lil-Taʼlīf wa-al-Tarjamah wa-al-Nashr. OCLC 792883381.
- Khalaf, Taissier (2009). موسوعة رحلات العرب والمسلمين إلى فلسطين (8 مجلدات) (Encyclopedia of Arab and Muslim trips to Palestine [8 Volumes]) (in Arabic). Dār Kanʻān. OCLC 949443939.
- Khalaf, Taissier (2014). Riḥlāt al-Baṭrīyark Diyūnīsīyūs at-Tilmaḥrī fī ʻahd al-ḫalifatain al-Maʼmūn wa-'l-Muʻtaṣim (The Journeys of Patriarch Dionysius I Telmaharoyo in the era of the two Caliphs Al-Ma'mun and Al-Mu'tasim) (in Arabic). Dār as-Suwaidī li-'n-Našr wa-'t-Tauzīʻ. OCLC 905467642.
- Khalaf, Taissier (2014). الرواية السريانية للفتوحات الاسلامية (The Syriac Account of the Islamic Conquests) (in Arabic) (2 ed.). Dār al-Takwīn. Archival Resource Key (ARK): ark:/13960/t82k1wr2f
- Khalaf, Taissier (2018). Min Dimashq ilá Shīkāghū, riḥlat Abī Khalīl al-Qabbānī ilá Amīrkā 1893 (From Damascus to Chicago, the Journey of Abu Khalil Qabbani to America 1893) (in Arabic). al-Muʼassasah al-ʻArabīyah lil-Dirāsāt wa-al-Nashr. OCLC 1031399379.
- Khalaf, Taissier (2018). Nashʼat al-masraḥ fī bilād al-Shām: min hashāshat al-qānūn ilá fatāwá al-taḥrīm, 1847-1917. Wathāʼiq wa-maʻārik Dimashq, Bayrūt, ʻAkkā (The formation of theatre in Bilad al-Sham: from the fragility of law to the fatwas of prohibition, 1847-1917. The documents and battles of Damascus, Beirut, Akre.) (in Arabic). al-Hayʼah al-ʻArabīyah lil-Masraḥ. OCLC 1104664985.
- Khalaf, Taissier (2019). Waqāʼiʻ masraḥ Abī Khalīl al-Qabbānī fī Dimashq, 1883-1873: ḥaqāʼiq wa-wathāʼiq tunsharu lil-marrah al-ūlá (The events of Abu Khalil Qabbani's theatre in Damascus, 1883-1873: facts and documents published for the first time) (in Arabic). Manshūrāt al-Mutawassiṭ. OCLC 1110667615.
- Khalaf, Taissier (2019). الحركة النسائية المبكرة في سوريا العثمانية: تجربة الكاتبة هنا كسباني كوراني (The Early Feminist Movement in Ottoman Syria: the case of Writer Hanna K. Korany) (in Arabic). Arab Center for Research and Policy Studies. ISBN 978-6-144-45308-7.
- Khalaf, Taissier (2021). ملكات عربيات قبل الإسلام (Arab Queens Before Islam) (in Arabic). Dar al-Muheet. ISBN 978-9-948-84505-8.
- Khalaf, Taissier (2022). سيرة الأجواق المسرحية العربية في القرن التاسع عشر : مذكرات الممثلين عمر وصفي ومريم سماط (Biography of Arab Theater Choirs in the Nineteenth Century: Memoirs of Actors Omar Wasfi and Maryam Samat) (in Arabic). Manshūrāt al-Mutawassiṭ. OCLC 1296609741.
- al-Salameen, Zeyad; Khalaf, Taissier (2023). "New Nabataean Inscriptions from Ḥaurān, Southern Syria". Abgadiyat. 17 (17): 13–24. doi:10.1163/22138609-01701004. ISSN 1687-8280.
- Khalaf, Taissier (2023). من عكّا إلى تكساس: مذكّرات قسطنطين أسعد سيقلي (1861 - 1925) (From Acre to Texas: A Memoir by Constantine Asad Saikali, 1861-1928) (in Arabic). Arab Center for Research and Policy Studies. ISBN 978-614-445-559-3.
