= Patrick Seale =

British journalist and author (1930–2014)

- Born: 7 May 1930; Belfast, Northern Ireland, United Kingdom
- Died: 11 April 2014 (aged 83); London, England, United Kingdom
- Occupation: Journalist
- Spouse(s): Lamorna Heath (1971 - her death, 1978); Rana Kabbani (1985 -his death, 2014)

Patrick Abram Seale (7 May 1930 – 11 April 2014) was a British journalist and author who specialised in the Middle East. A former correspondent for The Observer, he interviewed many Middle Eastern leaders and personalities. Seale was also a literary agent and art dealer.

== Background ==
Patrick Abram Seale was a Belfast-born journalist. His father was Morris Siegel Seale (1896–1993), the Arabist and theologian, who was a Russian Jewish convert to Presbyterianism and Christian missionary in Syria, where Patrick spent most of his first 14 years. Seale's mother was Reine Attal, a Tunisian-Italian midwife. Seale attended Balliol and St Antony's College, Oxford, where he specialised in Middle Eastern history. He obtained his D.Litt. at Oxford University. His sister was the fashion designer Thea Porter.

== Career ==
His journalistic experience includes six years with Reuters, mainly as a financial journalist, and over twelve with The Observer, covering the Middle East, Africa, and India.

Based in France, Seale was syndicated by Agence Global. His columns appeared in most major newspapers around the world, and were carried weekly by several newspapers, including Al-Hayat (London), Al-Ittihad (Abu Dhabi), The Daily Star (Beirut), The Saudi Gazette (Jeddah) and Gulf News (Dubai).

== Personal life and death ==
Seale married twice. First to Lamorna Heath in 1971 (died 1978) with whom he had a son, the actor Orlando in 1973. In 1976 Lamorna had a daughter, Delilah, from an affair with author Martin Amis. Seale's second wife, the writer and broadcaster Rana Kabbani, was the mother of his younger children, journalist Alexander Seale and writer and translator Yasmine Seale.

Patrick Seale died aged 83 on 11 April 2014 in London from brain cancer.

== Works ==
Seale authored numerous books, including:

- The Struggle for Syria (1965)
- French Revolution 1968 (1968)
- Philby, the Long Road to Moscow (1973)
- The Hilton Assignment (1973)
- Asad of Syria: The Struggle for the Middle East (1988)
- Abu Nidal: A Gun for Hire (1992)
- The Struggle for Arab Independence: Riad el-Solh and the Makers of the Modern Middle East (2010)
