= Diana Poulton =

English lutenist and musicologist

Diana Poulton, also known as Edith Eleanor Diana Chloe Poulton née Kibblewhite (18 April 1903, Storrington – 15 December 1995, Heyshott) was an English lutenist and musicologist.

From 1919 through 1923 she studied at the Slade School of Fine Art. She was a pupil of Arnold Dolmetsch (1922–5) and became a leading member of the early music revival. She played a key role in the revival of the popularity of the lute and its music. She was married in 1923 to the illustrator Tom Poulton whom she met when he was teaching at the Slade.

== Bibliography ==
Diana Poulton wrote an authoritative biography of lutenist and composer John Dowland (pub. Faber & Faber, 1972, revised and expanded second edition 1982).

Diana Poulton has been the subject of a full-length biography by Thea Abbott.
