= Andrew A. Chien =

American academic

Andrew Chien

Academic background
- Education: Massachusetts Institute of Technology (SB, SM, ScD)

Academic work
- Discipline: Computer science
- Sub-discipline: Systems architecture High-performance computing Database theory
- Institutions: University of Chicago; University of California, San Diego; University of Illinois Urbana-Champaign

Andrew A. Chien is an American computer scientist working as the William Eckhardt Distinguished Service Professor of Computer Science at the University of Chicago.

== Education ==
Chien earned a Bachelor of Science in electrical engineering, Master of Science in computer science, and PhD in computer science from the Massachusetts Institute of Technology.

== Career ==
From 1990 to 1998, Chien was a professor of computer science at the University of Illinois Urbana-Champaign and National Center for Supercomputing Applications. From 1998 to 2005, he was the SAIC Endowed Chair Professor in Computer Science at the University of California, San Diego. During his time at UCSD, he founded the Center for Networked Systems. From 2005 to 2010, Chien worked as the vice president of research at Intel. He joined the University of Chicago in 2011 and has since worked jointly as the William Eckhardt Distinguished Service Professor in the Department of Computer Science and senior computer scientist at the Argonne National Laboratory. Chien is also the editor-in-chief of Communications of the ACM.
