= Human Molecular Genetics =

- Discipline: Molecular genetics
- Language: English
- Edited by: Charis Eng

Publication details
- History: 1992-present
- Publisher: Oxford University Press (United Kingdom)
- Frequency: Biweekly
- Open access: Hybrid
- Impact factor: 3.1 (2025)

Standard abbreviations
- ISO 4: Hum. Mol. Genet.

Indexing
- ISSN: 0964-6906 (print); 1460-2083 (web)
- LCCN: 92643389
- OCLC no.: 39511714

Links
- Journal homepage; Online archive

Human Molecular Genetics is a semimonthly peer-reviewed scientific journal published by Oxford University Press. It covers all topics related to human molecular genetics. In addition, two "special review" issues are published each year. The editor-in-chief is Charis Eng (Case Western Reserve University). The journal was established in 1992.

== Abstracting and indexing ==
The journal is abstracted and indexed in:

- Abstracts in Anthropology
- Animal Breeding Abstracts
- Biological Abstracts
- Biotechnology Citation Index
- BIOSIS Previews
- CAB Abstracts
- Current Contents/Life Sciences
- EMBASE
- Genetics Abstracts
- Global Health
- ProQuest databases
- Science Citation Index Expanded
- Tropical Diseases Bulletin
- Weed Abstracts

According to the Journal Citation Reports, the journal has a 2020 impact factor of 6.150.
