= J–Machine =

Parallel computer

The J–Machine (Jellybean-Machine) was a parallel computer designed by the MIT Concurrent VLSI Architecture group in conjunction with the Intel Corporation. The machine used "jellybean" parts—cheap and multitudinous commodity parts, each with a processor, memory, and a fast communication interface—and a novel network interface to implement fine grained parallel programs.

== History ==
The J-machine project was started in 1988 based on work in Bill Dally's doctoral work at Caltech.

The philosophy of the work was "processors are cheap and memory is expensive," the J in the project's title standing for jellybean which are small cheap candies. In order to make use of large numbers of processors, the machine featured a novel network interface using message passing. This allowed a node to send a message to any other node within 2 microseconds.

Three 1024-node J-machine systems have been built and are kept at MIT, Caltech and Argonne National Laboratory.
