= Nizar Qabbani =

Syrian diplomat, poet and publisher (1923–1998)

- نزار توفيق قباني
- Born: 22 March 1923; Damascus, Syrian Federation
- Died: 30 April 1998 (aged 75); London, England
- Education: Damascus University
- Occupation: Poet
- Website: nizarq.com

Nizar Tawfiq Qabbani (Arabic: نزار توفيق قباني, ALA-LC: Nizār Tawfīq Qabbānī; 22 March 1923 – 30 April 1998) was a Syrian poet, diplomat, and publisher who is widely regarded as Syria’s national poet. Qabbani’s work is noted for its blend of simplicity and lyrical elegance, addressing themes of love, eroticism, feminism, religion, Arab nationalism, and resistance to both foreign imperialism and domestic authoritarianism. He remains one of the most celebrated and influential contemporary poets in the Arab world. His notable relatives include the playwright Abu Khalil Qabbani, diplomat Sabah Qabbani, writer Rana Kabbani, and translator Yasmine Seale.

== Biography ==
=== Early life ===
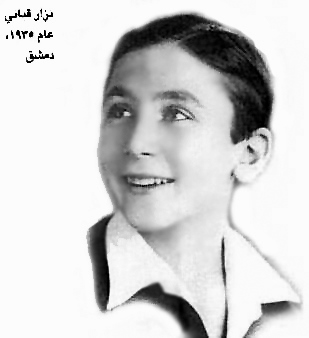
Nizar Qabbani in childhood.

Nizar Qabbani was born in Damascus, the capital of Syria, into a middle-class merchant family of Syrian-Arab origins. Nizar Qabbani's mother Fayza was of Turkish or Arab origin. One source reports that the Qabbani family had earlier origins in Konya, Anatolia. Others note that the Qabbani family was of Arab origin too, despite immigrating from Turkey. He was raised in the Old City of Damascus and attended the National Scientific College School from 1930 to 1941. Qabbani later studied law at Damascus University, then known as the Syrian University, graduating with a bachelor’s degree in law in 1945.

The family name Qabbani is derived from the Arabic word Qabban (قبان), meaning "steelyard balance."

While studying at university, Qabbani published his first collection of poems, The Brunette Told Me, in 1942. The collection’s inclusion of sexual themes generated considerable controversy. In response, Qabbani presented the manuscript to Munir al-Ajlani, then Syria’s minister of education and a prominent nationalist figure. Al-Ajlani expressed his approval of the work and wrote the preface to the collection.

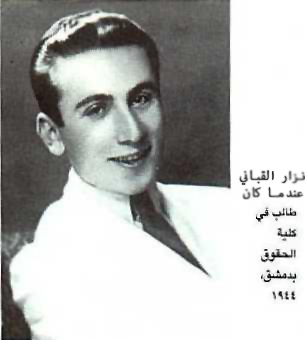
Qabbani as a law student in Damascus, 1944.

=== Diplomatic career ===
Following his graduation from law school, Qabbani joined the Syrian Ministry of Foreign Affairs, serving as consul or cultural attaché in several major cities, including Beirut, Cairo, Istanbul, Madrid, and London. In 1959, after the formation of the United Arab Republic, he was appointed vice-secretary for the union’s embassies in China. During his diplomatic postings, Qabbani continued to write prolifically, producing several works considered among his finest, including poems inspired by his time in China. He remained in the diplomatic service until his resignation in 1966.

== Literary influences ==
At the age of fifteen, Qabbani’s older sister, Wisal, died under disputed circumstances. Reflecting on his literary approach, he once stated: “Love in the Arab world is like a prisoner, and I want to set it free. I want to free the Arab soul, sense, and body with my poetry. The relationships between men and women in our society are not healthy.”

In 1981, Qabbani’s wife, Balqis al-Rawi, was killed in the 1981 Iraqi embassy bombing in Beirut during the Lebanese Civil War. Her death had a profound impact on his life and work, inspiring the elegiac poem Balqis, in which he expressed both personal grief and political anger, holding Arab regimes responsible for her death. In the poem, Qabbani described her life as “a sacrifice” and lamented that “after you, poetry will cease and womanhood is out of place,” portraying her loss as a metaphor for the suffering of the Arab people in the Levant.

The city of Damascus remained Qabbani’s most enduring muse, inspiring numerous works, most notably The Jasmine Scent of Damascus. While deeply connected to his native city, he also expressed a pan-Arab identity, portraying the Arab world from Mauritania to Iraq as a single community united by a shared history and struggle.

In his poem Umm al-Mu'tazz, Qabbani described every Arab city as part of his “family tree,” evoking images of maternal care, childhood memories, and shared pain, and affirming his solidarity with the people of each city.

Qabbani was a vocal critic of colonial and imperial projects in the Middle East, as well as of the corruption, oppression, and hypocrisy he saw among Arab leaders. His political verse often employed direct and confrontational language. In his poem Sultan, he addressed authoritarian rulers, accusing them of silencing dissent and persecuting those who spoke out.

== Personal life ==
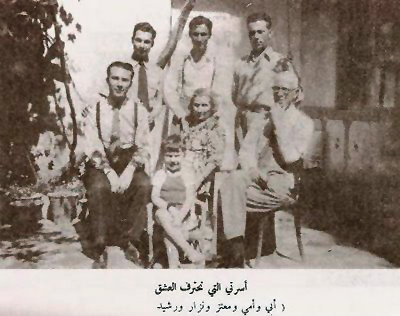
Qabbani with his family, his parents and brothers.

=== Family ===
Qabbani had two sisters, Wisal and Haifa, and three brothers, Mu'taz, Rashid, and Sabah. The latter, Sabah Qabbani, became the director of Syrian radio and TV in 1960 and served as Syria's ambassador to the United States in the 1980s.

His father Tawfiq Qabbani had a chocolate factory. He also helped support fighters resisting the French Mandate for Syria and the Lebanon and was imprisoned many times for his views, greatly affecting the upbringing of Nizar into a revolutionary in his own right. Qabbani's grandfather, Abu Khalil Qabbani, was one of the leading innovators in Arab dramatic literature.

=== Marriages ===
Qabbani married twice in his life. His first wife was his cousin Zahra Aqbiq; together they had a daughter, Hadba, and a son, Tawfiq. Tawfiq died due to a heart attack when he was 22 years old when he was in London. Qabbani eulogized his son in the famous poem "To the Damascene Prince, Tawfiq Qabbani". Zahra Aqbiq died in 2007. His daughter Hadba, born in 1947, was married twice, and lived in London until her death in April 2009.

His second marriage was to an Iraqi woman named Balqis al-Rawi, a schoolteacher he met at a poetry recital in Baghdad; she was killed in the 1981 Iraqi embassy bombing in Beirut during the Lebanese Civil War on 15 December 1981. Together they had a son, Omar, and a daughter, Zainab. After the death of Balqis, Qabbani did not marry again.

== Late life and death ==
After the death of Balqis, Qabbani left Beirut. He moved between Geneva and Paris, eventually settling in London, where he spent the last 15 years of his life. In exile, Qabbani continued to write poems and raise controversies and arguments. Notable and controversial poems from this period in his life include When Will They Announce the Death of Arabs? and Runners. On 30 April 1998, at the age of 75, Qabbani died in London of a heart attack. In his will, which he wrote in his hospital bed in London, Qabbani wrote that he wished to be buried in Damascus, which he described in his will as "the womb that taught me poetry, taught me creativity and granted me the alphabet of Jasmine." He was mourned by Arabs all over the world, with international news broadcasts highlighting his illustrious literary career.

== Awards and tributes ==
- 1992–1993 Al Owais Award for Cultural & Scientific Achievements.
- On 21 March 2016, Google celebrated his 93rd birthday with a Google Doodle.

== Bibliography ==
=== Poetry ===
Qabbani began writing poetry when he was 16 years old; at his own expense, Qabbani published his first book of poems, entitled The Brunette Told Me (قالت لي السمراء), while he was a law student at the University of Damascus in 1944.

Over the course of a half-century, Qabbani wrote 34 other books of poetry, including:

- Childhood of a Breast (1948) طفولة نهد
- Samba (1949) سامبا
- You Are Mine (1950) أنت لي
- Poems (1956) قصائد
- My Beloved (1961) حبيبتي
- Drawing with Words (1966) الرسم بالكلمات
- Diary of an Indifferent Woman (1968) يوميات امرأة لا مبالية
- Poems of Longing (1970) قصائد متوحشة
- Book of Love (1970) كتاب الحب
- 100 Love Letters (1970) مئة رسالة حب
- Poems Against The Law (1972) أشعار خارجة على القانون
- I Love You, and the Rest is to Come (1978) أحبك أحبك و البقية تأتي
- To Beirut the Feminine, With My Love (1978) إلى بيروت الأنثى مع حبي
- May You Be My Love For Another Year (1978) كل عام وأنت حبيبتي
- I Testify That There Is No Woman But you (1979) أشهد أن لا امرأة إلا أنت
- Secret Diaries of Baheyya the Egyptian (1979) اليوميات السرية لبهية المصرية
- I Write the History of Woman Like So (1981) هكذا أكتب تاريخ النساء
- The Lover's Dictionary (1981) قاموس العاشقين
- A Poem For Balqis (1982) قصيدة بلقيس
- Love Does Not Stop at Red Lights (1985) الحب لا يقف على الضوء الأحمر
- Insane Poems (1985) أشعار مجنونة
- Poems Inciting Anger (1986) قصائد مغضوب عليها
- Love Shall Remain My Lord (1987) سيبقى الحب سيدي
- The Trilogy of the Children of the Stones (1988) ثلاثية أطفال الحجارة
- Secret Papers of a Karmathian Lover (1988) الأوراق السرية لعاشق قرمطي
- Biography of an Arab Executioner (1988) السيرة الذاتية لسياف عربي
- I Married You, Liberty! (1988) تزوجتك أيتها الحرية
- A Match in My Hand, And Your Petty Paper Nations (1989) الكبريت في يدي ودويلاتكم من ورق
- No Victor Other Than Love (1989) لا غالب إلا الحب
- Do You Hear the Cry of My Sadness? (1991) هل تسمعين صهيل أحزاني ؟
- Marginal Notes on the Book of Defeat (1991) هوامش على دفتر النكسة
- I'm One Man and You are a Tribe of Women (1992) أنا رجل واحد وأنت قبيلة من النساء
- Fifty Years of Praising Women (1994) خمسون عاما في مديح النساء
- Nizarian Variations of Arabic Maqam of Love (1995) تنويعات نزارية على مقام العشق
- Alphabet of Jasmine (1998) أبجدية الياسمين

=== Other works ===
He also composed many works of prose, such as My Story with Poetry قصتي مع الشعر, What Poetry Is ما هو الشعر, and Words Know Anger الكلمات تعرف الغضب, On Poetry, Sex, and Revolution عن الشعر والجنس والثورة, Poetry is a Green Lantern الشعر قنديل أخضر, Birds Don't Require a Visa العصافير لا تطلب تأشيرة دخول, I Played Perfectly and Here are my Keys لعبت بإتقان وها هي مفاتيحي and The Woman in My Poetry and My Life المرأة في شعري وفي حياتي, as well as one play named Republic of Madness Previously Lebanon جمهورية جنونستان لبنان سابقا and lyrics of many famous songs of celebrated Arab singers, including:

- Mohammed Abdel Wahab (Ayazon: does he think?)
- Abdel Halim Hafez (Qareat Alfinjan: The cup reader)
- Fairuz (La Tasaalouny: Don't Ask Me)
- Kadhim Al-Sahir (Madrasat Alhob: School of Love)
- Umm Kulthum (Alan Endi Bondoqyah: Now I Have Rifle)
- Latifa (Talomony Aldunia: The universe blames me)
- Majida El Roumi (Beirut Sit Aldunia: Lady of universe Beirut)
- Asalah (Eghdab kama Tashaa: Get angry as you may)
- Najat Al Saghira (Matha Aqool Laho?: What shall I say to him?)
- Nancy Ajram (Ila Beirut aluntha: To the feminine Beirut )

His verses have remained popular after his death, and have been set to songs by Arab pop-music stars such as Kazem al-Saher and Latifa. However, such songs were introduced after revising the original poems.

=== Other languages ===
Many of Qabbani's poems have also been translated into English and other foreign languages, both individually and as collections of selected works. Some of these collections include:

English

- "On Entering the Sea" (1998)
- "Arabian Love Poems" (1998), translated by Bassam Frangieh and Clementina R. Brown
- "Republic of Love" (2002), translated by Nayef al-Kalali
- "Journal of An Indifferent Woman" (2015), translated by George Nicolas El-Hage, PhD

Italian

- "Poesie", a cura di G. Canova, M.A. De Luca, P. Minganti, A. Pellitteri, Istituto per l’Oriente, Roma 1976.
- "Il fiammifero è in mano mia e le vostre piccole nazioni sono di carta e altri versi", a cura di V. Colombo, San Marco dei Giustiniani, Genova 2001.
- "Il libro dell’amore", traduzione di M. Avino, in Antologia della letteratura araba contemporanea. Dalla nahda a oggi, a cura di M. Avino, I. Camera d’Afflitto, Alma Salem, Carocci, Roma 2015, pp. 116–117.
- "Le mie poesie più belle", traduzione dall’arabo a cura di N. Salameh e S. Moresi, postfazione di P. Caridi, Jouvence, Milano 2016.

Nepali

Many of Qabbani's poems have been translated into Nepali by Suman Pokhrel, and are collected in an anthology tilled Manpareka Kehi Kavita.

Hindi

Many of Qabbani's poems are translated into Hindi by Siddheshwar Singh, Arpana Manoj, Manoj Patel, Rinu Talwar and other translators.

Russian

Evgeniy Dyakonov wrote his PhD thesis on the translation of Qabbani's poetry into Russian; Dyakonov's translations were published by Biblos Consulting, Moscow, in 2007.

== See also ==
- List of Arabic-language poets
- Syrian literature – 20th-century poetry
