= Thames A-class rater =

Type of sailing boat

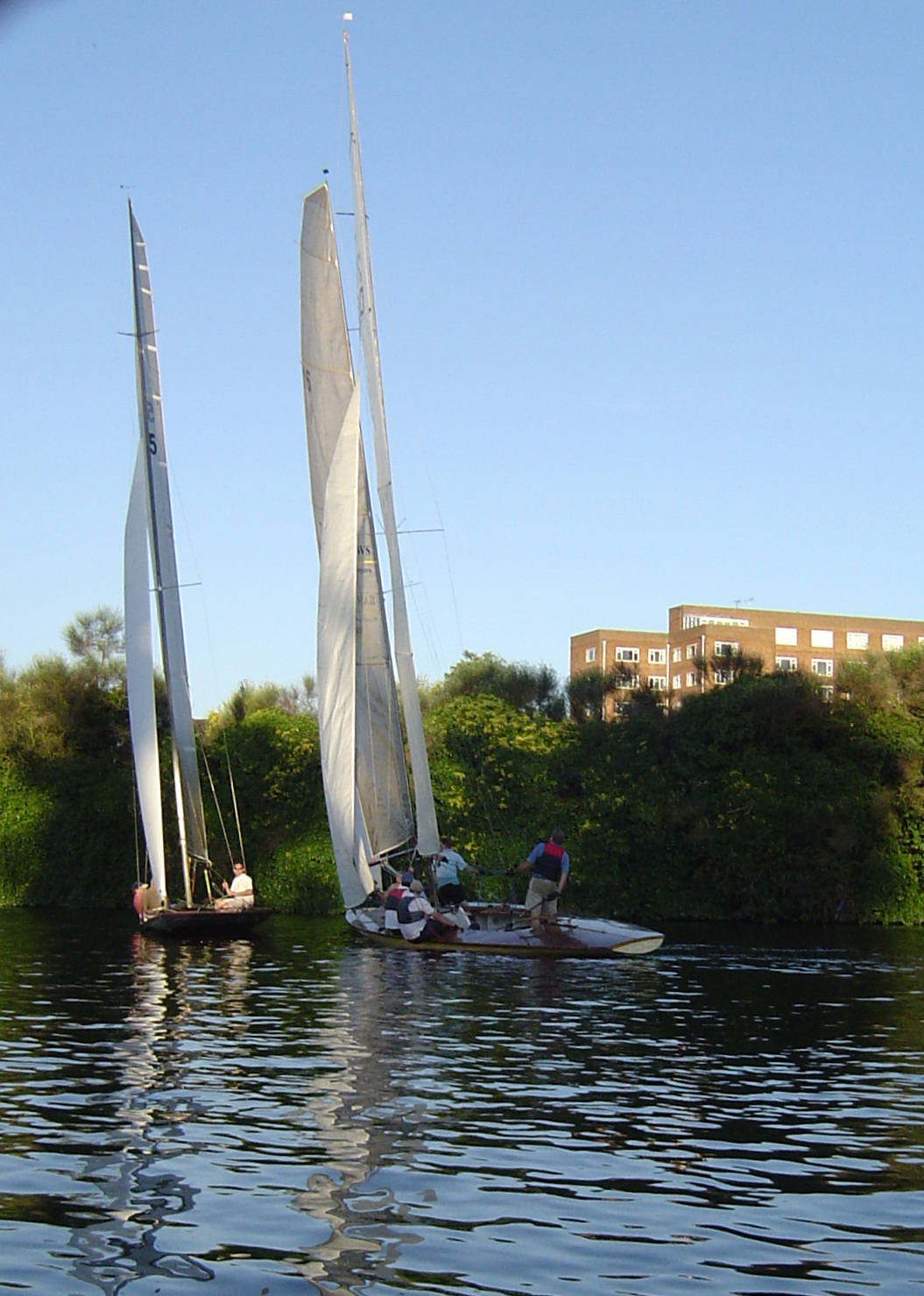
Thames Raters near Raven's Ait

The Thames A Class Rater is both a historic and modern specialist sailing craft designed for the particular conditions at Thames Sailing Club, on the River Thames at Surbiton in England. The class is a development of the Half Rater, which was designed by Linton Hope and Alfred Burgoyne in 1907. The rules refer to the craft as a yacht.

The rig is lofty, supported by standing rigging and usually by runners, and the hull is a scow with metal centreplate.

All boats built before 1922 are made from wood whilst those built since are of a different construction.

The rater is extremely fast, planes easily, and is a technically highly challenging boat to sail in anything above moderate wind conditions. It is usually sailed with a crew of three.

Raters have traditionally commuted by river under tow between Thames Sailing Club at Surbiton and Upper Thames Sailing Club at Bourne End, Buckinghamshire.

== Where raters sail ==
- Thames Sailing Club
- Upper Thames Sailing Club
- Yangon Sailing Club
- Regattas

Mixed in with large fleets of other boats, the raters are usually seen at the following regattas with very tight, close quarters racing.

- Tamesis Easter Regatta - Tamesis Club at grid reference TW177707, racing between Teddington Lock and Kingston Railway Bridge.
- The Bourne End Week regatta at Upper Thames Sailing Club (seen as the Raters 'national' championships)

== Handicap ==
Unusually, for a class designed about a rule allowing wide variation in most design parameters, individual boats are handicapped.

Handicaps will be determined by a handicap committee consisting of the Rater Captain, plus the fastest and slowest helms in the FRP and wooden fleets respectively, based on the results of the most recent Thames Championship. In the event that the Rater Captain is one of the latter four, the closest helm to the Rater Captain in their category shall also be co-opted to the committee.

This committee will meet two or three times a year to decide the handicap of all boats.

The overriding principle that the committee will work to is to encourage the older and slower boats to compete.

== The Queens Cup ==
Presented by Queen Victoria in 1893 the race is set to be nine miles with a four-hour time limit. The race takes place on the final day of Bourne End week and is considered the most prestigious race that the raters compete in.
