= John Poulton =

John Poulton is an electrical engineer at Nvidia Corporation in Durham, North Carolina. He was named a Fellow of the Institute of Electrical and Electronics Engineers (IEEE) in 2012 for his contributions to high-speed, low power signaling and graphics architecture.
