= Elisabeth Jaquette =

American translator

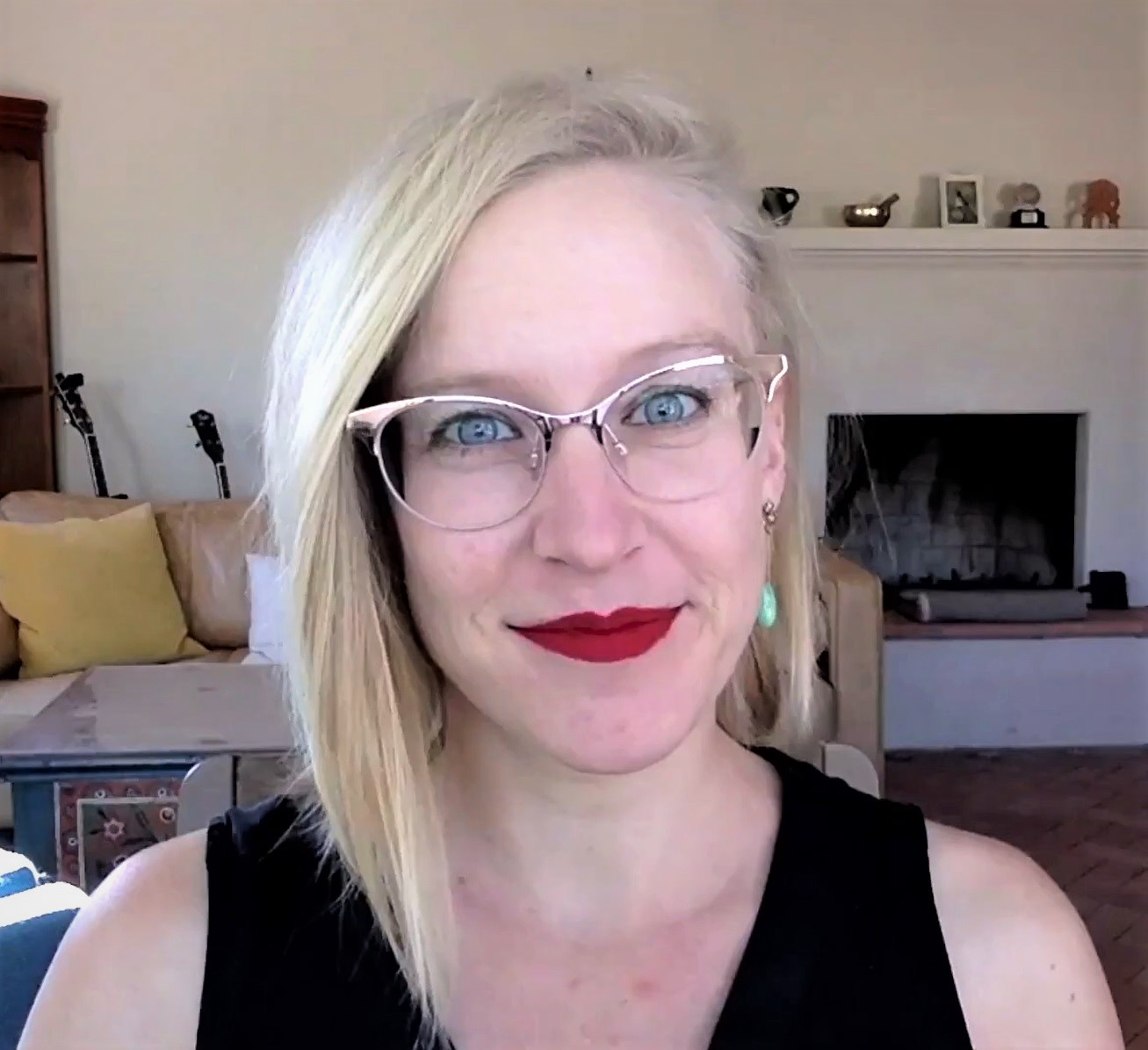
Jaquette reads for the National Book Foundation in 2020

Elisabeth Jaquette is an American translator of modern Arabic literature. Her work has been shortlisted for the National Book Award and TA First Translation Prize, and supported by the Jan Michalski Foundation, the PEN/Heim Translation Fund, and several English PEN Translates Awards. She has a BA from Swarthmore College and an MA from Columbia University and was a CASA Fellow at The American University in Cairo. She is also Executive Director of the American Literary Translators Association.

== Selected works ==
=== Translator ===
- Minor Detail by Adania Shibli (New Directions, 2020)
- The Frightened Ones by Dima Wannous (Knopf, 2020) (nominated for the Banipal Prize for Arabic Literary Translation in 2021)
- Thirteen Months of Sunrise by Rania Mamoun (Comma Press, 2019)
- The Apartment in Bab el-Louk by Donia Maher (Darf Publishers, 2017)
- Suslov's Daughter by Habib Abdulrab Sarori (Darf Publishers, 2017)
- The Queue by Basma Abdel Aziz (Melville House, 2016)

== See also ==
- List of Arabic-English translators
