= Yasmine Seale =

British-Syrian writer and literary translator

- Born: 1989 (age 36–37); London
- Occupation: writer
- Parents: Patrick Seale (father); Rana Kabbani (mother)

Yasmine Seale is a British-Syrian writer and literary translator who works in English, Arabic, and French. Her translated works include The Annotated Arabian Nights: Tales from 1001 Nights and Aladdin: A New Translation. She is the first woman to translate the The Arabian Nights from French and Arabic into English. In 2020, she received the Queen Mary Wasafiri New Writing Prize for Poetry.

== Career ==
Seale has written essays, poetry, and visual art, and has translated literary works from Arabic and French. In 2018, her translation of Aladdin was published by W. W. Norton & Company. In 2021, her translation of The Arabian Nights, titled The Annotated Arabian Nights was published by W. W. Norton. The 2021 publication is an abbreviated version of her translation of Arabian Nights, and a more substantial version is planned for publication by W. W. Nortion in 2023.

In 2021, Seale won a 2022 PEN America grant to support her translation from Arabic of If You See Them Fall to Earth by Abd al-Ghani al-Nabulsi. She is also translating the work of Al-Khansa for the Library of Arabic Literature.

She co-translated the poetry collection Agitated Air: Poems after Ibn Arabi with Robin Moger, which was published in 2022. Her translation of the poetry collection titled Something Evergreen Called Life by the writer formerly known as RaMa and now known as Rania Mamoun was published in 2023.

In addition to her written work, she gives workshops on theory and practice of English-Arabic translation.

== Critical reception ==
=== Aladdin: A New Translation ===
A review for Publishers Weekly states, "Seale's splendid translation introduces readers to the surprising depth of Aladdin’s adventures while maintaining a classical feel" and "This exhilarating translation will thrill fans of darker, more complex fairy tales and upend readers' preconceived image of Aladdin." A review in The New Yorker states, "This new translation of the classic tale is, like the lamp at its center, darker, grubbier, and more twisted than its Disneyfied iteration, emphasizing its transgressive qualities", and "Seale's text has a fluidity and an elegance that give even this diet of "dreams, smoke, and visions" a satisfying heft."

In a review for Gramarye, Ruth B. Bottigheimer writes, "Seale's translation maintains a lively narrative rhythm; her smooth rendering reflects her deep knowledge of 17th- and 18th-century French", and "Seale revises the Nights’ black-white prejudice by regularly omitting the African part of the wicked magician's identity. This is appropriate, I think, for a stand-alone translation of 'Aladdin' that is intended for a broad readership."

=== The Annotated Arabian Nights: Tales from 1001 Nights ===
A review for The Economist states, "Western adaptations have sometimes misrepresented the original tales, often to satisfy Orientalist fantasies of the Middle East. Meanwhile, though female peril and ingenuity are at the heart of the story, until now no woman has published a full English translation of the story cycle. All of which makes this new edition—translated by Yasmine Seale, a female British-Syrian poet—quietly momentous." In a review for The Washington Post, Michael Dirda writes, "In general, Seale's Englishing of "Alf Layla wa-Layla"— "The Thousand Nights and a Night" — redresses the 19th-century's Orientalizing bent and occasional racism, while also reminding us that women, and not just Scheherazade, are at the heart of these wonderful stories."

In a review for The National, Ben East writes, "Seale's own background as a French and Arabic speaker makes her the perfect person to translate from both languages, and to ensure the Diyab stories themselves have a cultural underpinning that makes sense in the 21st century as well as the 18th." In The New Yorker, Yasmine AlSayyad describes the book as "an electric new translation" and writes, "The most striking feature of the Arabic tales is their shifting registers—prose, rhymed prose, poetry—and Seale captures the movement between them beautifully." Robyn Creswell writes in The New York Review that Seale's translation "has a texture – tight, smooth, skillfully patterned – that make previous versions seem either garish or slightly dull by comparison."

=== Agitated Air: Poems after Ibn Arabi ===
In a review for ArabLit Quarterly, Marcia Lynx Qualey writes, "In this collection, [Seale and Moger] each began with a translation of one of Ibn Arabi’s works, then emailed this translation to the other. In the light and shadow of this new partner-translation, each made a new iteration, and then sent it back to the other, and again, and again, until either the poem or the poet-translators were exhausted" and "What's different about Agitated Air is that we have one original and multiple reflections of/on the same short work, by two poet-translators in conversation or debate."

Reem Abbas writes in a review for the P. N. Review, "Hopelessly grasping as the interpretation of one's own desires may sound, Seale and Moger to manage to translate Ibn Arabi's own spiritual translations into English in language that is equally sheer with desire and torment (شوق)."

== Selected works ==
=== Poetry ===
- "Conventional Wisdom" (winner of the 2020 Queen Mary Qasafiri New Writing Prize)

=== Translation ===
- Aladdin: A New Translation (ed. Paulo Lemos Horta, 2018) ISBN 978-1-63149-516-8
- The Annotated Arabian Nights: Tales from 1001 Nights (ed. Paulo Lemos Horta, foreword by Omar El Ekkad and afterword by Robert Irwin, 2021) ISBN 978-1-63149-363-8
- "The Gap" by Maya Abu al-Hayyat (short story) (published in All Walls Collapse: Stories of Separation, edited by Will Forrester and Sarah Cleave, 2022) ISBN 1-912697-57-2
- Agitated Air: Poems After Ibn Arabi, with Robin Moger (ed. Dominic Jaeckle, 2022) ISBN 978-1-8380200-4-0
- Something Evergreen Called Life by Rania Mamoun, 2023 ISBN 9780900575181

=== Essays and articles ===
- "The Travels of a Master Storyteller," The Paris Review, May 2021 (first published as foreword to Elias Muhanna's translation of Hanna Diyab's The Book of Travels)
- "After the Revolution: Three novels of Egypt's repressive present," Harper's Magazine, January 2018
- "Camera Ottomana," on Ottoman photography, FRIEZE, September 2015
- "Q v. K," on Turkish alphabet politics, LRB blog, October 2013

== Personal life ==
Seale was raised in Europe and grew up speaking English, Arabic, and French. Her mother is Syrian, and her father is Tunisian-Russian and was raised in the United Kingdom. Seale is the great-niece of Syrian poet Nizar Qabbani.
