= List of sail emblems =

The list of sail emblems consists of sail emblems and their class description.

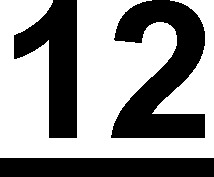
12 Metre

12m² Sharpie

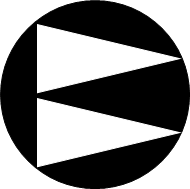
125

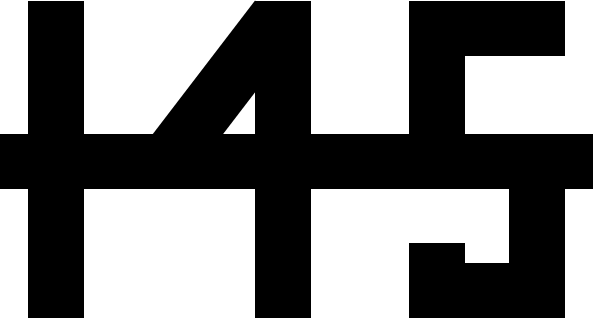
145

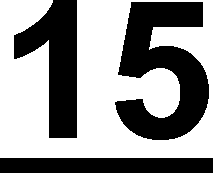
15 Metre

2.4 Metre

29er

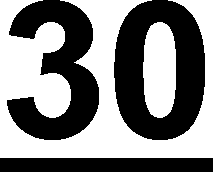
30m² Skerry cruiser

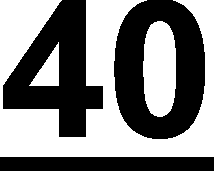
40m² Skerry cruiser

420

470

49er

49er FX

5.5 Metre

5O5

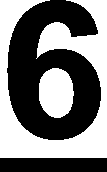
6 Metre

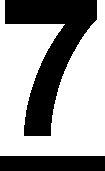
7 Metre

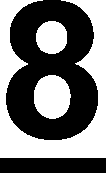
8 Metre

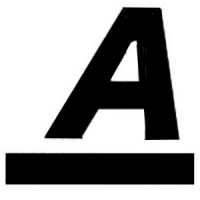
A-Scow

Albin Express

Albin Vega

Australian Sharpie

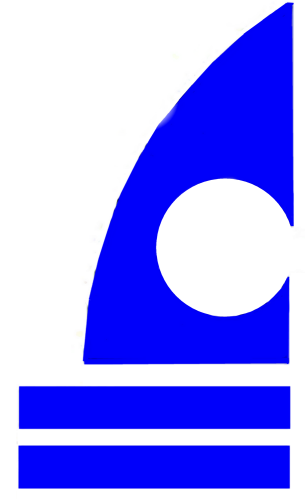
C-Scow

Cadet

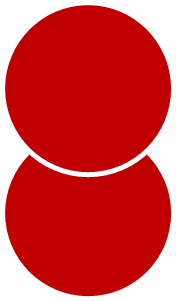
Cherry 16

Classe Mini

Contender

Corsair

Cyclone 13

Dart 18

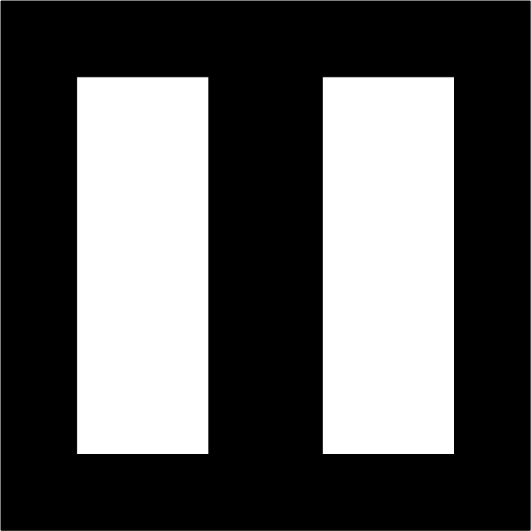
Division II

Dragon

E-Scow

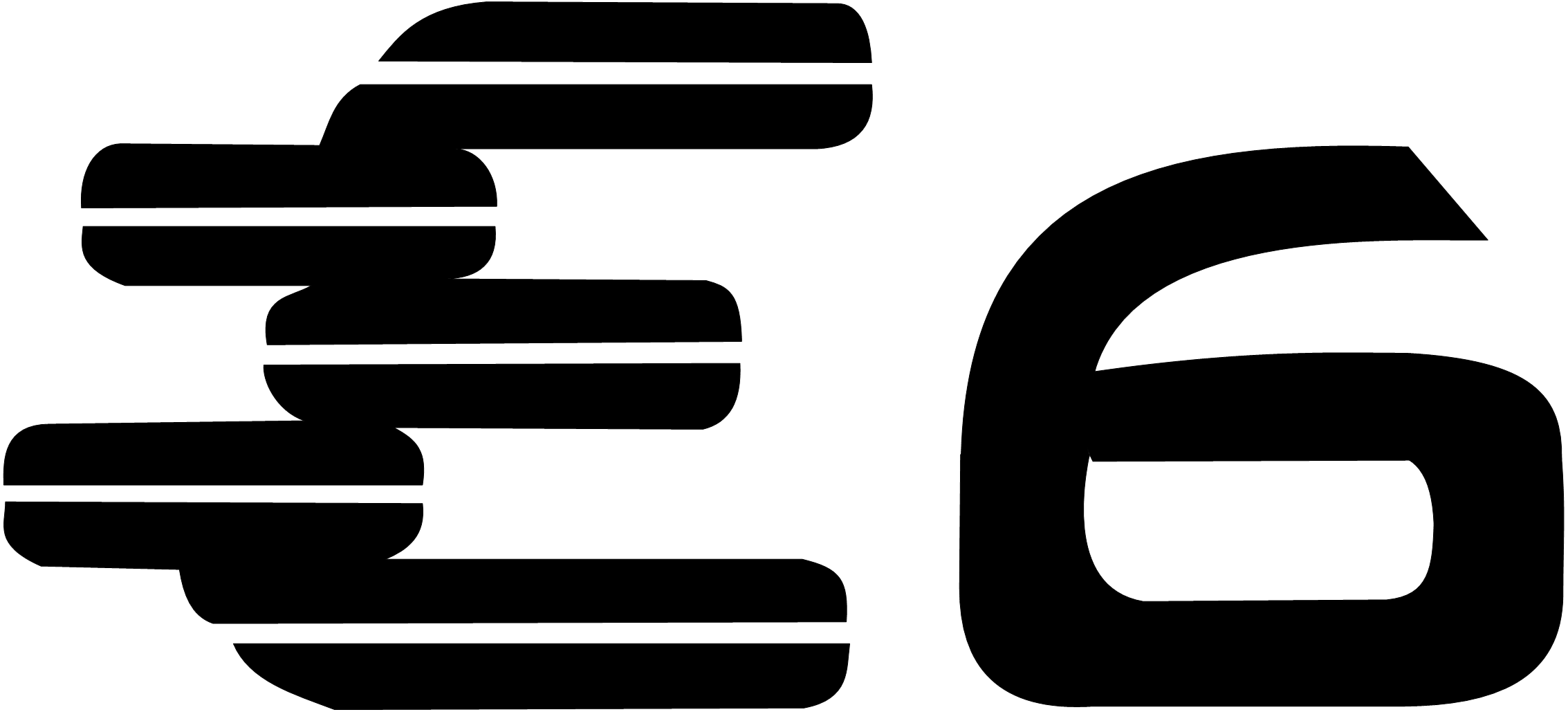
Elliott 6m

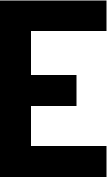
Enterprise

Europe

Finn

Fireball

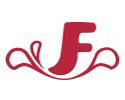
Flash

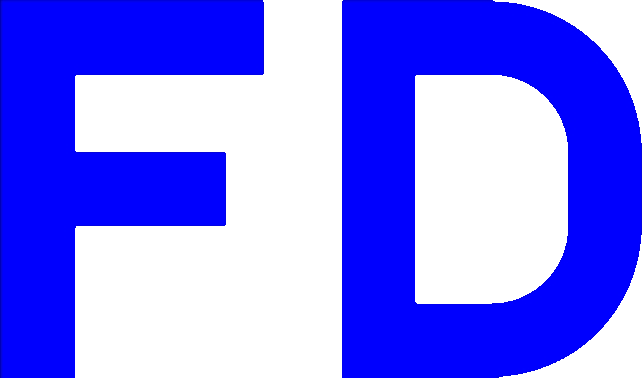
Flying Dutchman

Flying Junior

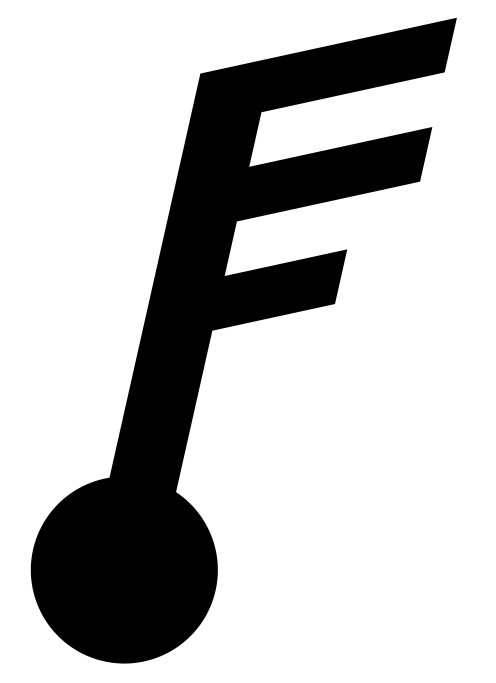
Force 5

Freedom Yachts

Foxer Dinghy

GP14

Hansa-Jolle

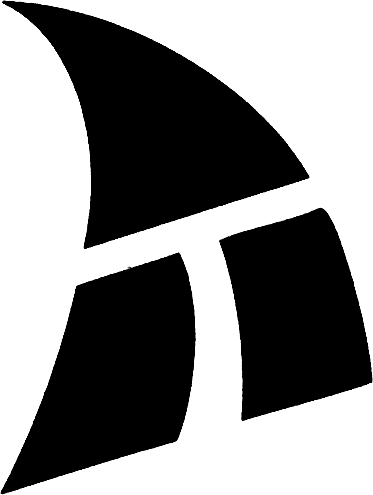
Hartley TS16

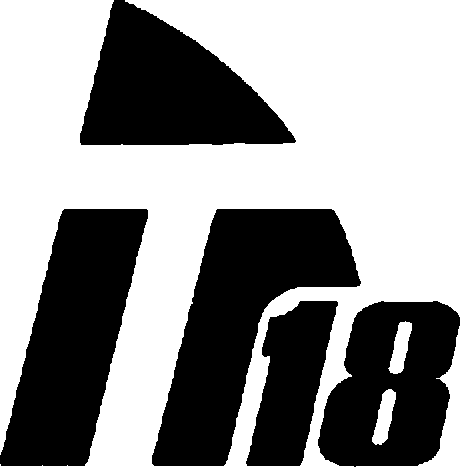
Hartley TS18

H-boat

International 806

International A-class catamaran

International Moth

IF-boat

Ixylon

J/22

J/24

J/80

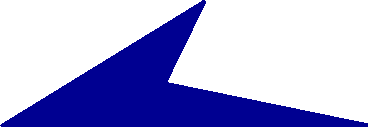
Javelin (Australasia)

Kielzugvogel

Knarr

Laser

Laser Radial

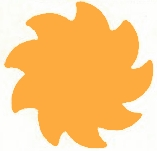
Leisure 17

L’Équipe

Nacra 17

Melges 24

Micro

Mirror

Mistral One Design

Monarch

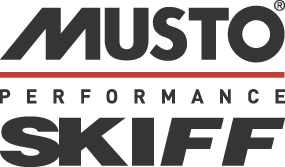
Musto Performance Skiff

Mutineer 15

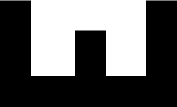
National E (Lazy E)

Neptun 22

Neptunkryssare

Nordic Folkboat

NS14

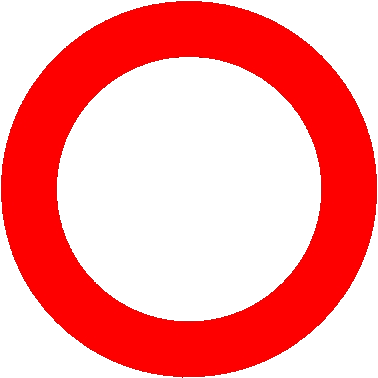
O-Jolle

OK

Optimist

Passatore

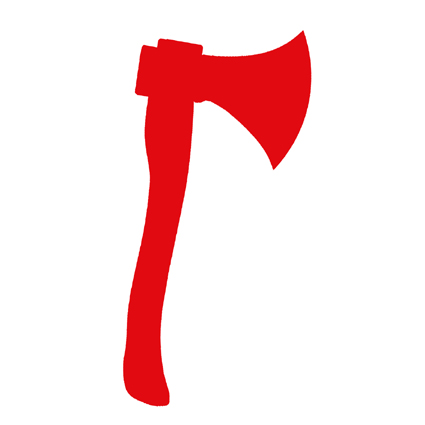
Pirate

Platu 25

RJ 85

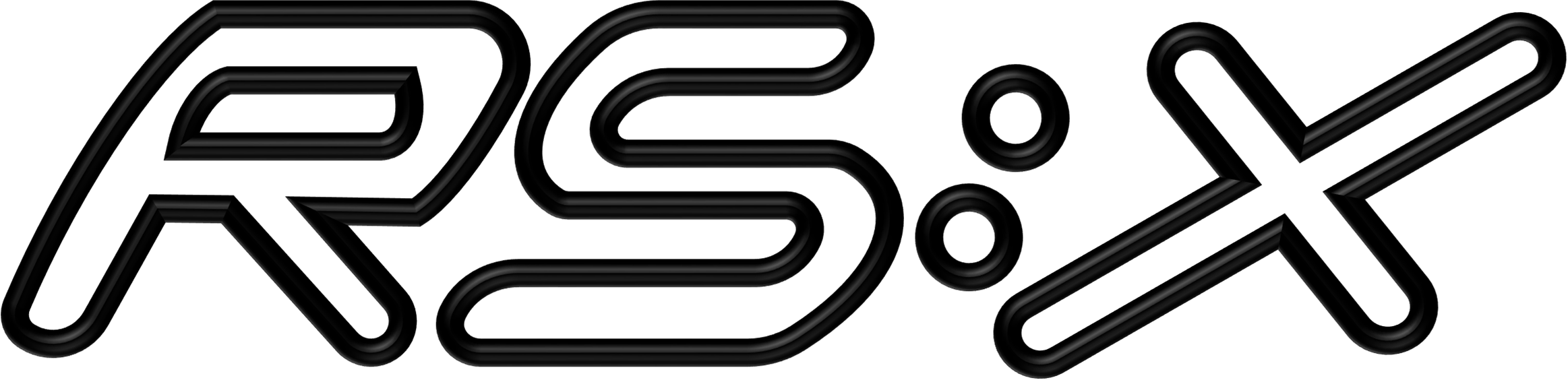
RS:X

Scampi

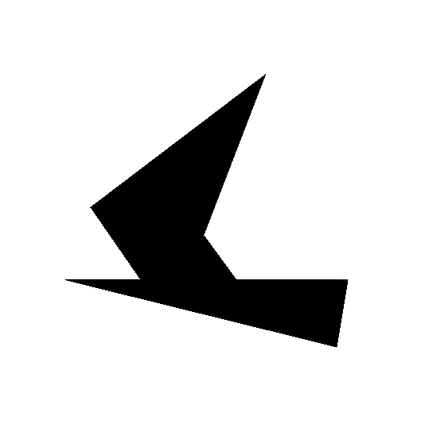
Schwertzugvogel

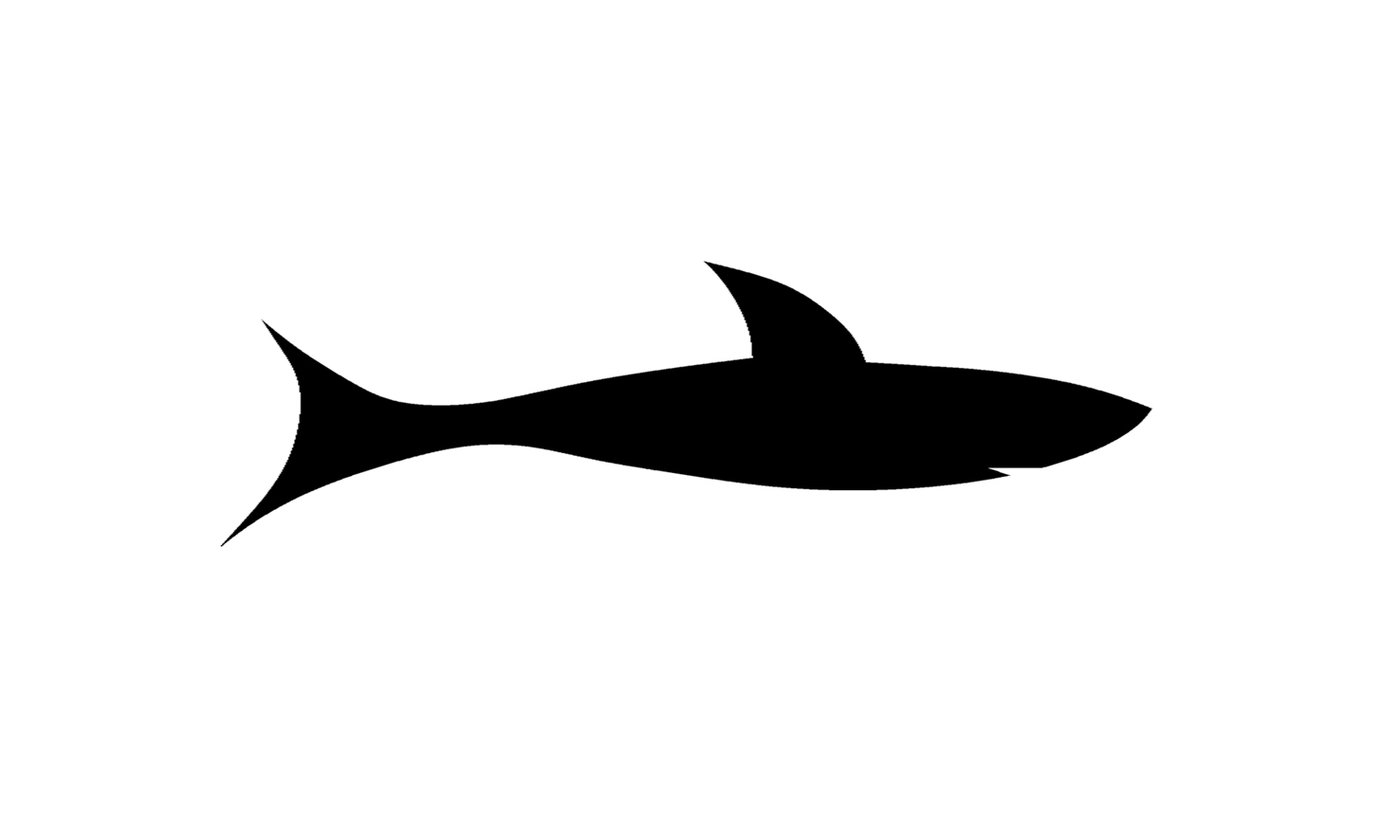
Shark

Korsar

Snipe

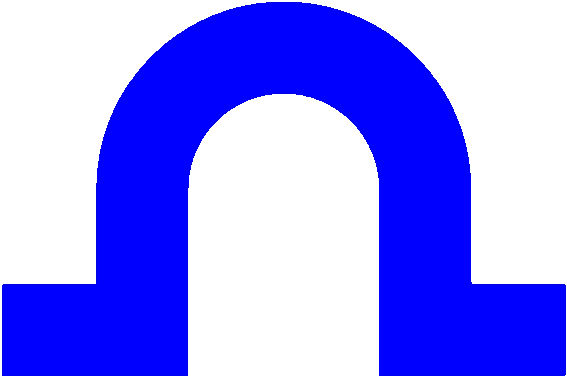
Soling

Sonar

Spækhugger

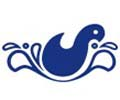
Splash

Star

Stjärnbåt

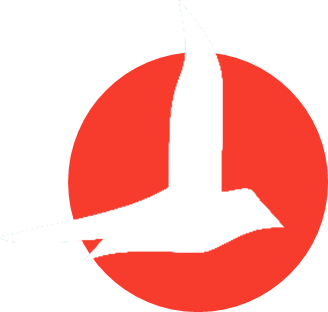
SunBird 25

SunMaid 20

Supernova (dinghy)

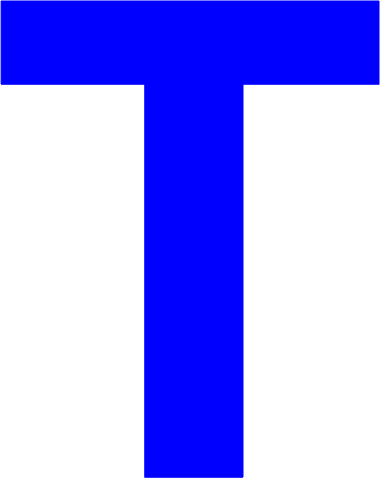
Tempest

Topper

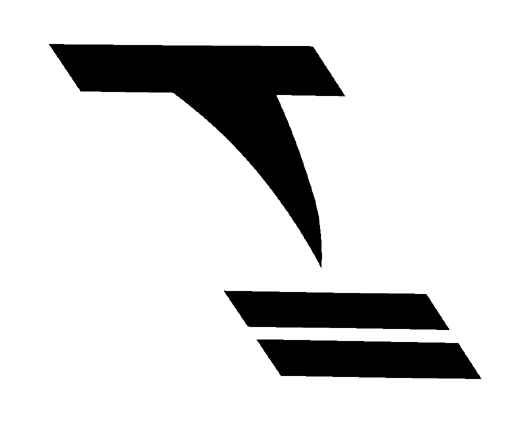
Tornado

TP 52

Trapez

Trias

Vaurien

VB-Jolle

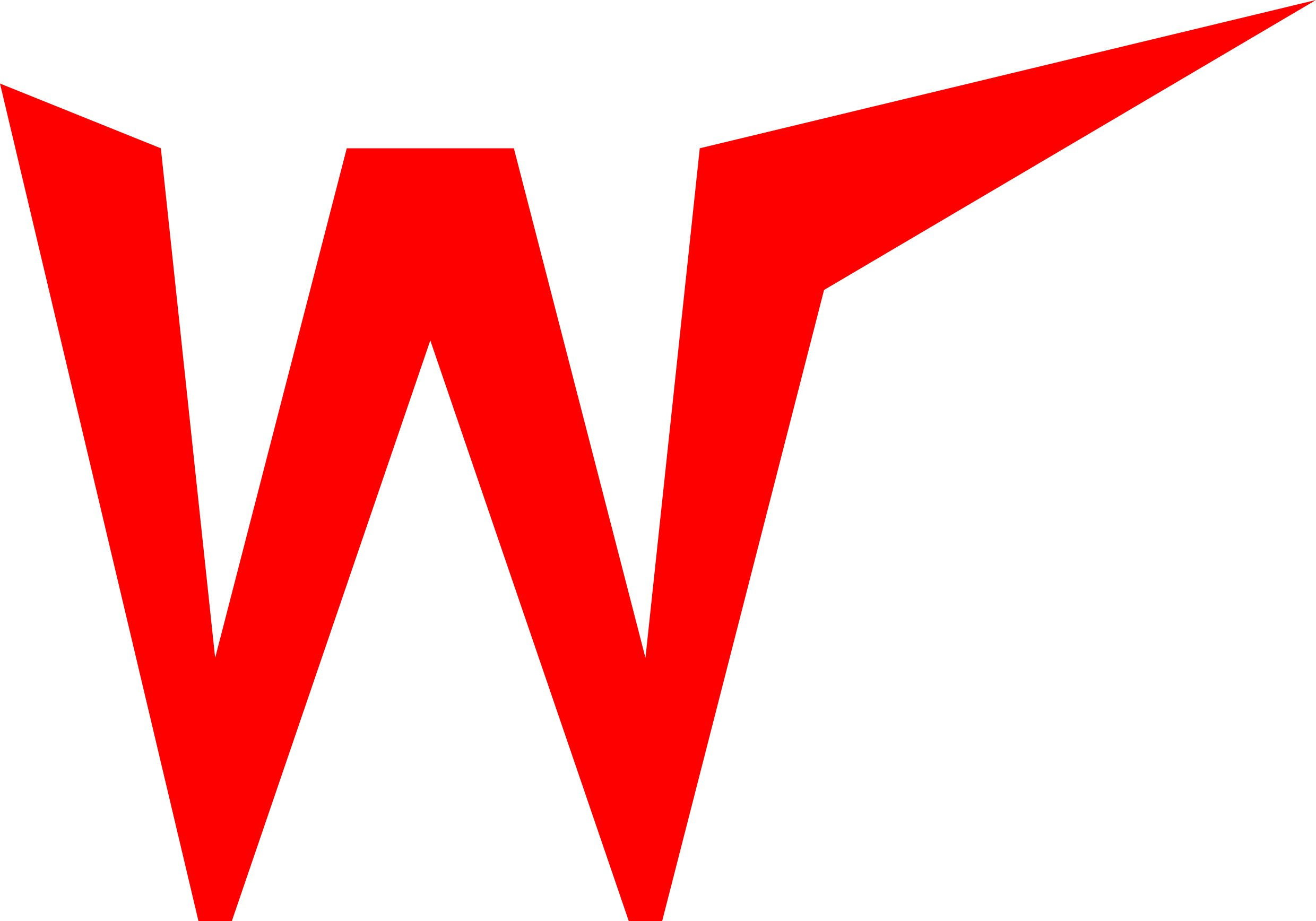
Wayfarer

Wibo (sailboat)

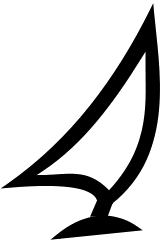
Windglider

X-79

X-99

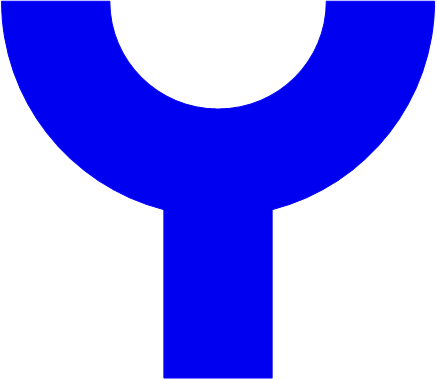
Yngling

== Other markings ==
| Boat Type | Class Marking | Marking description |
|---|---|---|
| Mirror | | Red Italic Capital letter M on a crescent section of a circle |
| Redwing | 18 | White Number on a dark red sail |
| Rhodes 19 | | An "R" surrounded by a "19", arranged to fit the contour of a circle |
| Sonar | | Six horizontal bars of progressively larger thicknesses, from top to bottom |
