= 125 (dinghy) =

Australian sailing and racing boat

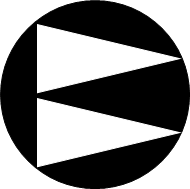
- Class symbol

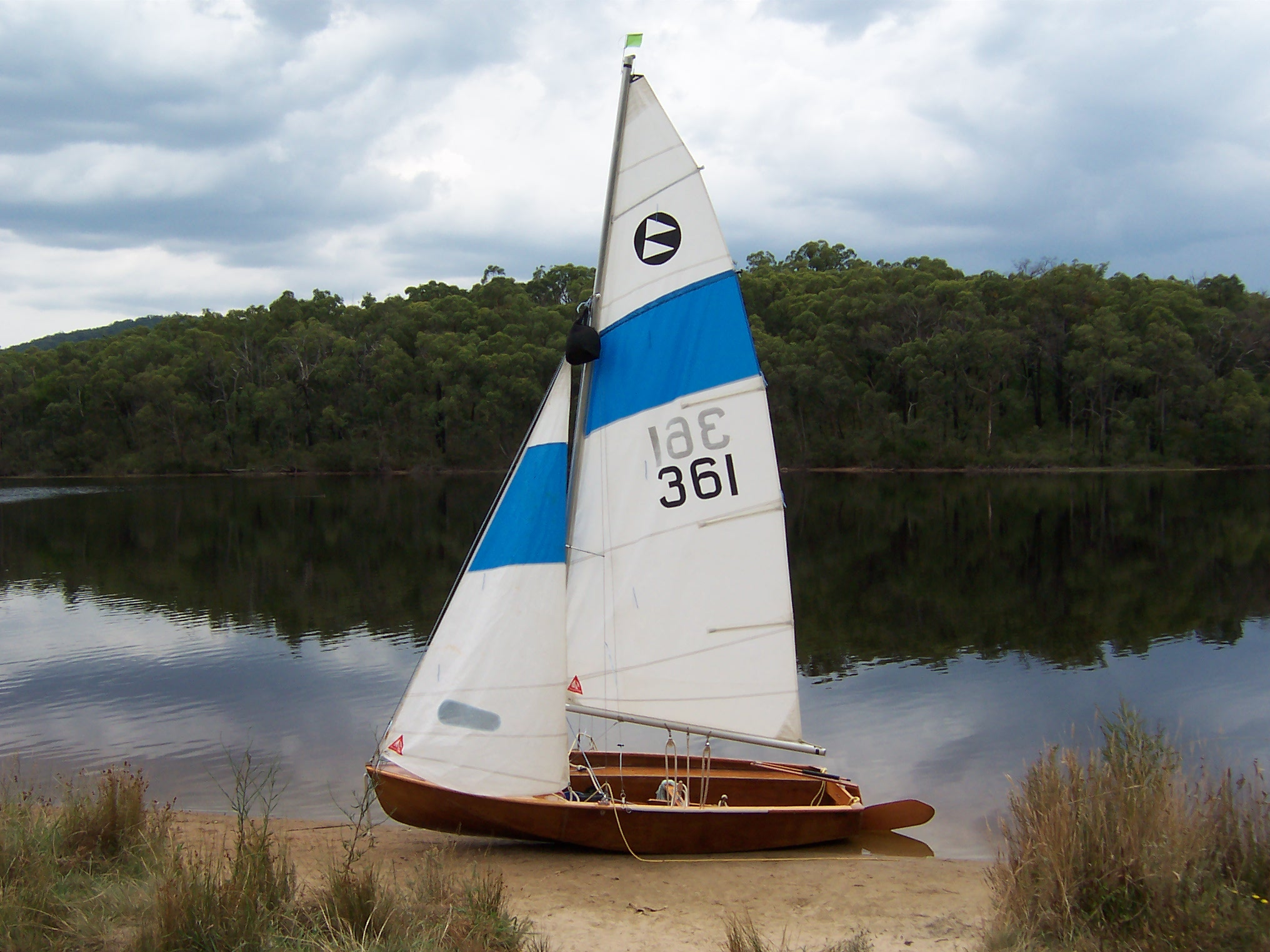

Development
- Designer: Simon Greig
- Location: Victoria, Australia
- Year: 1969
- Design: One-Design
- Role: Intermediate trainer, racing

Boat
- Crew: 2
- Trapeze: Single

Hull
- Type: Monohull
- Construction: GRP; Plywood; Foam Sandwich
- Hull weight: 50 kilograms (110 lb)
- LOA: 3.81 metres (12 ft 6 in)
- Beam: 1.43 metres (4 ft 8 in)

Hull appendages
- Keel: Centerboard

Rig
- Rig type: Fractional rigged sloop
- Mast height: 5.65 metres (18 ft 6 in)

Sails
- Mainsail area: 6.5 square metres (70 sq ft)
- Jib/genoa area: 3.0 square metres (32 sq ft)
- Spinnaker area: 8.6 square metres (93 sq ft)

Racing
- D-PN: 123.0

The 125 is a 12 ft 6 in (3.81 m) two person intermediate sailing dinghy complete with main, jib, spinnaker and trapeze. The 125 class has a strong following within Australia with national titles being held every year around the country and local state associations. The class was originally designed as an intermediate class for developing skills with the jib, spinnaker and trapeze but has become popular from novice to experienced sailors.

== History ==
The 125 was designed in 1969 by Simon Greig as a class that would sit between Jack Holt's 3.3 m (10 ft 10 in) Mirror and the larger Mirror 16 at 4.9 m (16 ft). As with the Mirrors, the 125 can be assembled from plywood using the "stitch and glue" method, and, as far as possible, the 125 uses Mirror parts in its design. The parallels between the boats go as far as the design of the sail insignia – the 125 employs a design based on the Mirror's symbol lying on its side.

Nevertheless, initial sales were not good, and with the arrival of the Mirror 14 Greig had decided not to continue production. However, John Coomer had built one of the few kits that had been sold, and encouraged Greig to continue producing kits if buyers were available. A new sail plan was developed based on the Flying Junior, and Coomer developed class rules and a constitution for the 125. Yet while his 125, Beauty Bottla, was successful in racing, there was no real demand for the class.

Things changed in 1972 when Greig handed over the copyright for the design to Coomer to be used by any association that might be formed. Subsequently, the new association was developed, the boat was marketed by the association, and as a result sail numbers increased from 6 in 1970 (with Coomer's boat) to 21 in late 1972. By 1977 over 950 sets of plans had been sold, and the first national championships were held that year.

In 1979, the 125 was also developed into the stretched 145 class and initially saw fast growth with an association and branches in all states and New Zealand. Ultimately the class proved less popular than its smaller cousin with 145 Associations disbanding in the early to mid 2000s.

The class continued to develop under a strict set of rules, with various modifications being made to the specification over the years – including, in 1990, a provision for fiberglass hulls.

== Popularity ==
According to the national association, there are a number of attributes of the class that may contribute to its popularity. In particular, the class caters to both intermediate sailors who have graduated from the sail trainers (such as the Sabot and Optimist dinghies), providing a more extensive sail plan and a trapeze on a relatively stable and forgiving hull, while also being suitable to both adult/child and adult/adult combinations. Furthermore, the 125 is a relatively low cost boat, making it suitable to sailing on a budget – especially if an older, wooden, hull is purchased. The boat can be sailed in all Australian states, and sailors can compete at both state and national levels of competition.

The popularity of the class to sailors of varying ages and skill levels can be problematic, as it leaves race organisers with difficulties trying to have all sailors finish within a reasonable time. As of 2009 there are fleets of 125's in Queensland, New South Wales, Victoria, South Australia and Western Australia.
