= Jacksnipe =

Two-man racing dinghy

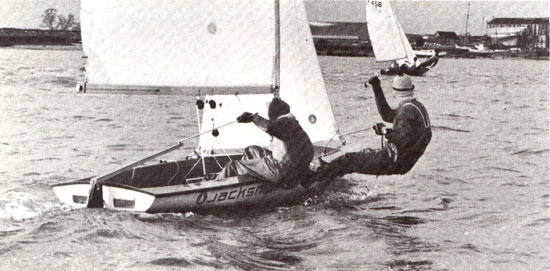

Boat
- Crew: 2
- Draft: 4 in (100 mm); 3 ft 8 in (1.12 m)

Hull
- Hull weight: 180 lb (82 kg)
- LOA: 15 ft 6 in (4.72 m)
- LWL: 14 ft 6 in (4.42 m)
- Beam: 4 ft 6 in (1.37 m)

Rig
- Mast height: 19 ft 4 in (5.89 m)

Sails
- Spinnaker area: 130 sq ft (12 m^{2})
- Upwind sail area: 128 sq ft (11.9 m^{2})

Racing
- RYA PN: 88 (in 1970)

The Jacksnipe is a two-man racing sailing dinghy with a single trapeze for the crew and symmetrical spinnaker.

== History and description ==
In the late 1960s, Jack Holt was asked by Peter Harris of the British Snipe Class Association to design an up-to-the-minute boat with a hull the same overall length as the International Snipe, which would carry the Snipe rig with the addition of a trapeze and spinnaker. The Snipe having failed to be selected for Olympic Games, it was hoped that a modern, high-performance boat might succeed.

At the time, scows were very much the thing, especially the Fireball, and so Holt drew up a flat-bottomed planing design, considerably lighter than the International Snipe, with a pivoting centreboard and a bold new cockpit design that still looks contemporary 40 years later. The name was suggested by Peter Scott.

The cockpit includes a double bottom (or false floor) which extends through almost to the bow, with deep, self-bailer equipped footwells each side of the centreline; a detachable foredeck was developed but has not been a feature of production boats. While the production deck, which extends well forward of the forestay fitting, would lend itself very well to incorporation of a spinnaker chute, none was ever fitted by the manufacturers, spinnaker stowage relying instead on an elasticated pocket or 'turtle' before the mast, under which the spinnaker could readily be stuffed.

At the time, the Class Secretary commented:

This exciting new design incorporates all modern features. The easily driven, lightweight hull planes readily yet possesses fantastic stability. Fully equipped she is priced considerably below other high-performance dinghies. Her round bilged hull, designed with glass fibre in mind, has a double bottom, self-draining through transom flaps and wells for helmsman and crew equipped with self bailers. The ample built-in buoyancy and reserve foam buoyancy is designed to make self rescue easy in the case of capsize.

The claims made were by no means excessive. The buoyancy arrangements are exemplary, allowing the boat to float low on its side when capsized making it easy for the crew to climb onto the centreboard and, in combination with a foam-filled mast, making it rare for the boat to fully invert. Yet the double floor provides for very rapid expulsion of any water in the cockpit after the boat is righted; a combination of virtues that few other designs can match. The deep footwells improve the boat's stability by positioning the crew low during manoeuvres, such as gybing, greatly adding to confidence.

A singlehanded option was envisaged, with a forward mast step position, a second, forward set of chainplates, and corresponding set of anchor points for the mainsheet bridle. With a longer tiller extension, the boat could then be sailed using just the mainsail and trapeze, Contender-style.

By comparison with its main rivals, the Fireball and Hornet, the Jacksnipe is lightly canvassed, which makes it ideal for lighter crews, but this combined with the large underwater planing surfaces leads to a boat which performs better in stronger than in lighter winds - a characteristic of many later 'skiff' designs. In overall performance terms, the Portsmouth Yardstick in 1970 was 88, which compared to 85 for the Fireball and 88 for the Hornet (at the time in its original form with jib rather than genoa, and a small spinnaker).

Some 32 examples were built by Jack Holt Limited, moulded by Lakeland Plastics before the design was passed to a chandlery which tried fitting 505 rigs to the hulls, resulting in a very fast (talk at the time was of speeds approaching those of an A-Class catamaran) but presumably over-canvassed boat, bearing in mind the narrow overall beam. A Fireball rig would surely have been more appropriate.

That the class failed to sell in large numbers can be attributed to stiff competition offered by the already well-established Fireball, and, ironically, to antipathy from within the British Snipe Class which had sponsored the new design but was split as to whether it would be detrimental to the popularity of the existing design (see ref 1).

Of current designs, the closest in terms of dimensions, cockpit layout, performance, ideal crew weight and sailing qualities is the 3000.
