= Mirror 16 =

Class of sailing dinghy

The Mirror 16 is a class of sailing dinghy which was sponsored by the Daily Mirror newspaper in 1963, and the design project was headed by Jack Holt. Its design was based upon the easy–to–construct stitch and glue principle introduced by Barry Bucknell for the Mirror 11 dinghy. The Mirror 16 was designed for the racing enthusiast and also the camping/potterer dinghy sailor. The concept was a relatively light dinghy with a large sail area that could easily be reefed. The mainsail was designed for slab reefing and the large genoa had roller reefing. The Mirror 16, like the Mirror 11, was produced with distinctive red sails. The Mirror 16 was faster than the Proctor-designed Wayfarer.

== Vital statistics ==
- LOA 16ft
- Beam 6ft
- Hull draft 6ins
- Sail area; Main 123 sq ft (11.4 m^{2}), Genoa 55 sq ft (5.1 m^{2}), Spinnaker 120 sq ft (11 m^{2}).
- Weight 260 lbs.

There were no plans and boats were built from kits provided by Bell Woodworking Company, the parts being made from templates. Bell Woodworking Company no longer exists and the templates have been lost. Currently a small group of enthusiasts are trying to recreate the design templates.

The Mirror 16 did not achieve the popularity of the other Mirror Classes. Only about 600 were built. The hull, made from 5mm plywood, was adequate but not strong enough to take punishment such as grounding on hard surfaces. Very few survive today since most have suffered from rot. About 30 boats are known to have survived some in the UK and others in Canada, US, and Australia. The group keep in contact by a list currently maintained by Barrie Skelcher.
