= Diamond Keelboat =

The Yachting World Diamond Keelboat (abbreviation: YW Diamond) is a multiple-chine sailing yacht nominally 30 feet in overall length, designed for racing and short-range inshore cruising.

== Origins ==
In 1958 the editors of the British Yachting World magazine proposed a high-performance sailing yacht that could be built cheaply from modern materials then entering common usage such as marine plywood for the hull skin and light alloy for the spars. Definitive plans were drawn up by well-known sailing dinghy designer Jack Holt and a prototype named Zest was completed in time for the 1961 International Boat Show in London. Plans were sold under the name Yachting World Keelboat in the hope that it would be adopted as a National and International racing class. Zest carried on her sail the identification number 1 below a black diamond, and after many years being nicknamed the Diamond Class, the name Yachting World Diamond or YW Diamond was officially adopted for the class in 1967.

== Specifications ==
The YW Diamond has an overall length of 9.18 metres (30.12 feet), waterline length of 7.3 metres, beam of 2.03 metres and draws 1.3 metres. The original designs called for three or four sails and could be raced with a crew of three or four. The design also called for two sleeping berths forward and potentially two inflatable mattresses aft for overnight trips, with rudimentary domestic facilities. Sitting room forward was enabled by the fairly prominent camber of the fore-deck.

== Australian History ==
YW Diamonds are considered to have become far more popular in Australia than any other country. The first local example was built at Pittwater (New South Wales) in 1962 and decade later about 130 had been built in all states, racing regularly as a class in all states except South Australia, as well as holding National Championships in the participating State capitals. Cooperation between state-based YW Diamond Associations saw uniform numbering schemes introduced in 1967 with the state postcode digit and a two digit identification number, for example the first four completed in Tasmania in 1965-67 carried numbers 701, 702, 703 and 704. The system was revised in 1971 to a simple diamond above a number that was allocated roughly in order of completion, the first four Tasmanian boats, for example, becoming 45, 42, 63 and 74.

From the mid-1970s YW Diamonds began to be built from fibreglass and resulting lower weights allowed improved performance. However they soon lost popularity as more modern designs appeared and relatively few of the 130 timber versions are believed to survive, and even less racing actively. However, there is a current resurgence of interest in the class and several are based at the Royal Yacht Club of Victoria in Williamstown and the Royal Geelong Yacht Club in Geelong, Victoria and race weekly.

The most recent Victorian State Championships were held in February 2021 at the Royal Yacht Club of Victoria (RYCV) and won by Paul Sandles and crew on "Do Not Engage"
