= Streaker =

Streaker may refer to:

- Someone who engages in streaking, purposely appearing and running nude in public
- Streaker (dinghy), a sailing dinghy
- Streaker (video game), a 1987 computer game published by Bulldog
- Combat Vehicle Reconnaissance (Tracked), a high-mobility carrier vehicle named Streaker, from the United Kingdom
- Streaker (SpaceDev), a small launch vehicle
- MQM-107 Streaker, a target-towing drone used by the U.S. Army and Air Force
- The Streaker, a starship crewed by dolphins, from David Brin's Uplift Universe novels

== See also ==
- Streak (disambiguation)
