= The Unlikely Voyage of Jack de Crow =

Book by A. J. Mackinnon

- First edition
- Author: A. J. Mackinnon
- Illustrator: A. J. Mackinnon
- Language: English
- Publisher: Black Inc.
- Publication date: 2002
- Publication place: United Kingdom
- Pages: 350
- ISBN: 978-1-86395-425-9

The Unlikely Voyage of Jack de Crow is a 2002 book written and illustrated by A. J. MacKinnon about the author's 1997 journey from North Shropshire to the Black Sea in a small Mirror dinghy.

The book describes a voyage that starts off as a trip from North Shropshire to the coast in a small (3.3m long) dinghy. When the author gets there, he decides to keep going through canals to London. Along the way he decides to continue the trip across the channel and then across canals to the Black Sea, ending up travelling around 4,900 kilometres.

Reviewers praised the book for its good-natured, humorous, self-deprecating tone.

In 2010, McKinnon published a second work in a similar vein, The Well at the World's End, describing his travels from Australia to Iona, Scotland without flying.
