= 145 =

145 may refer to:

- 145 (number), the natural number following 144 and preceding 146
- AD 145, a year in the 2nd century AD
- 145 BC, a year in the 2nd century BC
- 145 (dinghy), a two-person intermediate sailing dinghy
- 145 (South) Brigade, a regional brigade of the British Army that saw active service in both the First and the Second World Wars
- 145 (New Jersey bus), a New Jersey Transit bus route
- 145 Adeona, a main-belt asteroid
- Alfa Romeo 145, a 3-door hatchback
- Honda 145, a compact car

== See also ==
- List of highways numbered 145
