= Pacer (dinghy) =

Class of sailing dinghy

Boat
- Crew: 2

Hull
- Hull weight: 130 pounds (59 kg)
- LWL: 12 feet (3.7 m)
- Beam: 4.9 feet (1.5 m)

Rig
- Mast height: 19 feet (5.8 m)

Sails
- Mainsail area: 65 square feet (6.0 m^{2})
- Jib/genoa area: 20 square feet (1.9 m^{2})
- Spinnaker area: 80 square feet (7.4 m^{2})

Racing
- RYA PN: 1193

The Pacer class of sailing dinghy, formerly known as the Puffin Pacer, was designed in the United Kingdom by Jack Holt. It was commissioned by Puffin Paints and Glues to be designed as sailing dinghy for use by families, so needing to be larger than their earlier Puffin dinghy. It has since become a popular learning and racing dinghy in Australia, Canada, the Netherlands, India and the UK. The name was changed in the UK early 1970s, although Australia continued to use the name until 1989, when they followed the UK in dropping the "puffin" and chose the wedge-tailed shearwater as the boat's symbol.

Available with both wooden and fiberglass hulls and designed to be sailed by a crew of two, the Pacer has a rig consisting of three sails: a mainsail, jib and a spinnaker.

In a mixed fleet of classes, the Pacer races off a Portsmouth Yardstick handicap of 1193.
