= Jack Holt (dinghy designer) =

Jack Holt, OBE (8 April 1912 – 14 November 1995) was a prolific designer of sailing dinghies. His pioneering designs of dinghies using plywood did much to popularise the sport of sailing in the period immediately following World War II.

Born near the River Thames in Hammersmith, London, Holt designed more than 40 boats, many of which are listed below. He worked for many years with fellow sailing enthusiast and businessman Beecher Moore.

Jack Holt was awarded an OBE in 1979 for his services to sailing.

== Sailing Clubs ==
Jack Holt has been associated with several sailing clubs. His premises were next door to Ranelagh Sailing Club, and he designed the Merlin Rocket and his National 12 designs there.

In 1956, he was a co-founder of Wraysbury Lake Sailing Club.

He was closely associated with the London Corinthian Sailing Club, very close to his Putney premises.

== Jack Holt Designs ==
- Bumblebee
- Caboodle was a simple kit built singlehander
- Cadet (Note: The Cadet was Commissioned by Yachting World)
- Diamond Keelboat (Note: The 'Diamond Keelboat' was Commissioned by Yachting World)
- Enterprise (Note: The Enterprise was Originally the News Chronicle Enterprise, and was the first dinghy sponsored by a national paper)
- Explorer (dinghy)
- GP14
- Heron
- Hornet
- Ideal
- International 10sq m Canoe
- International 14 (Note: The International 14 is a development class.)
- Jacksnipe
- Jacksprat tender
- Lazy E, later renamed to National E
- Merlin Rocket (Note: Jack Holt collaborated with Beecher Moore in the design of the first Merlin Rocket)
- Miracle
- Mirror (Note: The Mirror was Designed by Jack Holt and Barry Bucknell)
- Mirror 16 (Note: The Mirror 16 was designed by Jack Holt as a larger version of the Mirror dinghy)
- National 12 (Note: National 12 is a development class, Holt had some very successful river designs)
- North Norfolk 16
- Pacer, formerly Puffin Pacer
- Pandamaran
- Rambler
- Solo
- Streaker
- Vagabond

A selection of Jack Holt plans are held in the archives of the National Maritime Museum Cornwall.

== Boatbuilding ==
In addition to designing boats, Jack was also a boatbuilder. His fittings business was in the loft above the boatbuilding workshop. Naturally he built all the boats he designed, but he also built boats designed by others, including the Albacore.

== Sailing fittings ==
Jack collaborated with Glen and Tony Allen from Essex to manufacture and supply a lightweight range of dinghy fittings, the fittings were known as Holt Allen fittings for 52 years until 2008 when the Allen side decided to distribute the fittings themselves under the brand Allen. The companies now trade separately as Holt Marine Ltd. and Allen Brothers (Fittings) Ltd. Holt Allen also made masts and spars for dinghies and a wide variety of other boat related fittings. Most of the fittings for the Mirror, Miracle, Mirror 14, Mirror 16 and Streaker were all provided by Holt Allen

== Sailmaker ==
Sails for early Puffins, those with a puffin silhouette on the main, were deep blue in colour and were made by Jack Holt Sails of Putney, England. Holt sails made sails for a large number of dinghy classes for many years from the 1970s to around the early 2000s
