= Miracle (dinghy) =

Dinghy sailboat

Boat
- Crew: 1–4

Hull
- Hull weight: 59 kg (130 lb)
- LOA: 3.89 m (12.8 ft)
- LWL: 3.69 m (12.1 ft)
- Beam: 1.59 m (5 ft 3 in)

Rig
- Mast height: 5.85 m (19.2 ft)

Sails
- Mainsail area: 6.8 m^{2} (73 sq ft)
- Jib/genoa area: 2.1 m^{2} (23 sq ft)
- Spinnaker area: 7.4 m^{2} (80 sq ft)

Racing
- RYA PN: 1194

The Miracle is a small dinghy sailboat popularized in the United Kingdom, and designed by Jack Holt — one of the last for the well-known designer.

The Miracle design represented the culmination of lessons learned from his many previous designs. Working in conjunction with Barry Read, Jack Holt developed the slot and glue method of constructing Miracles, which enabled some boats to be built from kits even by inexperienced amateurs. The first Miracle dinghies were built and launched in 1975. Since then, the Miracle's success grew strongly, and sail numbers today exceed 4,121.

The Miracle is sailing dinghy, ideal for beginners or experts, children and adults alike. There is a class association based in the UK, with several active fleets around the country.

The Miracle was supplied initially as a plywood kit and designed for home building, based on the slot and glue method of construction. As a result, many Miracles were built by enthusiasts. Subsequently, professionally assembled Miracles were built by Bell Woodworking, who were the sole source of kits, and a few by other professional builders. Build quality of the commercially built craft was reportedly very good, and is supported by the fact that many older examples have survived. Most Miracles are made of wood.

In the early 1990s, a composite version of the Miracle was developed, made from a combination of a glass-reinforced plastic (GRP) hull and wooden deck. Shortly after that, a boat made entirely of GRP was then produced, only a few of these remain, and they still attract good prices. In 1997, plans became available so that the dinghy could be produced as a home build again.
