= Solo (dinghy) =

Racing dinghy

National Solo
- Class symbol

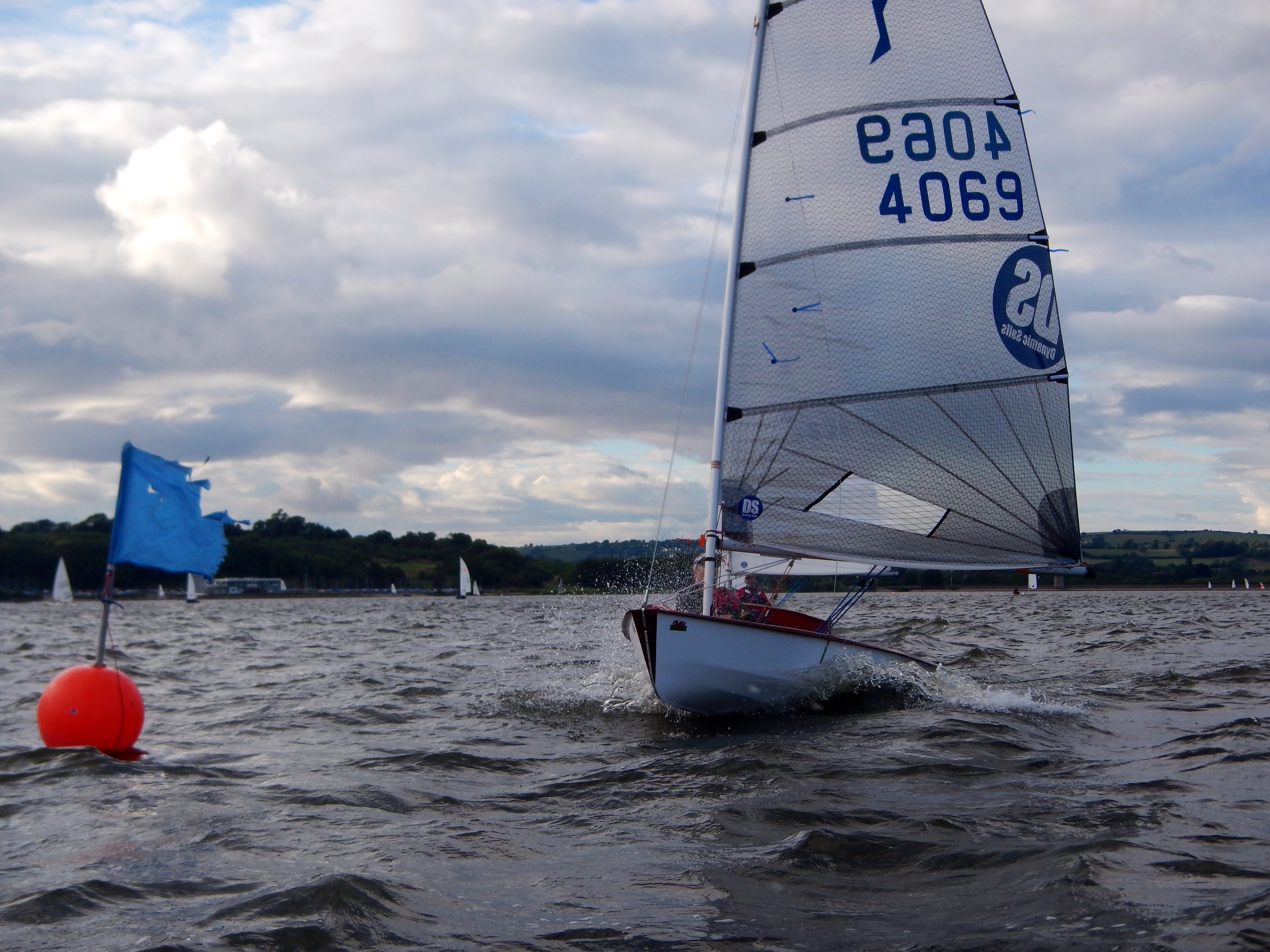
- Solo4069 at Chew Valley Lake Sailing Club.

Development
- Designer: Jack Holt
- Year: 1956
- Name: National Solo

Boat
- Crew: 1
- Draft: 1.07 m (3 ft 6 in)

Hull
- Type: Monohull
- Construction: Wood; GRP; Composite
- Hull weight: 70 kg (150 lb)
- LOA: 3.78 m (12 ft 5 in)
- Beam: 1.55 m (5 ft 1 in)

Rig
- Mast height: 5.97 m (19 ft 7 in)

Sails
- Mainsail area: 8.36 m^{2} (90.0 sq ft)

Racing
- D-PN: 94.0
- RYA PN: 1143 (2018)

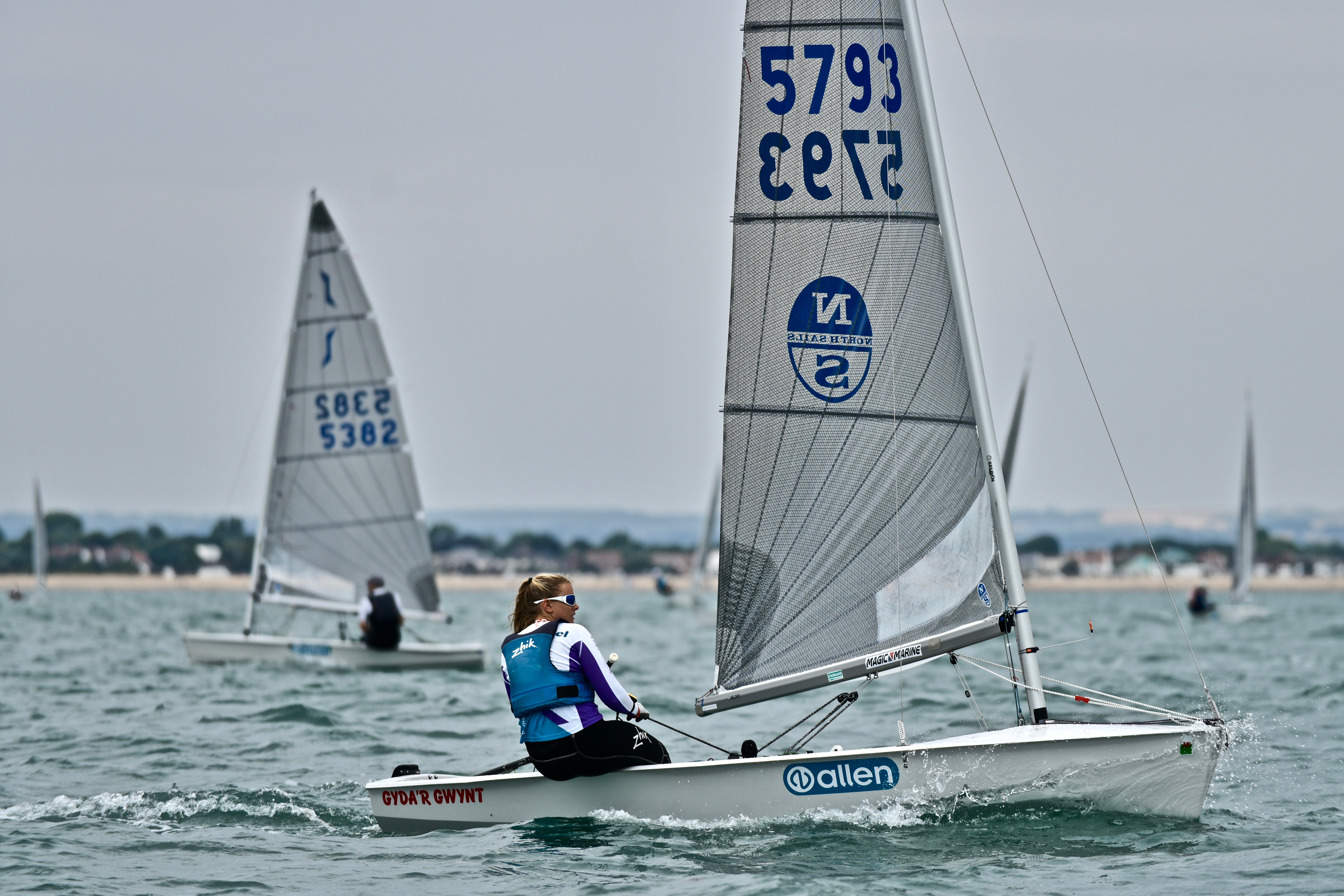
Ellie Cumpsty sailing Solo 5793 at the 2018 Solo National Championships, Hayling Island, UK.

The National Solo class is a racing dinghy designed by Jack Holt in 1956. The Solo is sailed in the United Kingdom, Holland, Portugal and Australia.

Originally designed in wood, competitive boats are now widely available in Fibre Reinforced Plastic (FRP) or composite construction (FRP hull and wood deck) as well as wood.

2016 was the 60th anniversary of the design and the Class Association organised a series of events to celebrate. A draw of all National Solo Class Association members was made in which the prize was Solo 6000.

2017 Class Measurement rule changes allowed corrector weights to be moved from the aft end of the centreboard cast to below the thwart.

- Double-chined hull
- May be constructed from wood, FRP or composite (GRP hull, wooden decking)
- Available as a kit, part-built or complete. Plans available from the RYA for a completely DIY boat.
- Keel stepped, stayed mast
- Fully battened sail
- Inward sloping decks for comfortable sitting out
- Most boats have centre mainsheet, but aft sheeting permitted by class rules
- A Very Active Class Association
- One of the most popular racing classes in the UK

== Some UK Clubs with large Solo fleets ==
- Barnt Green Sailing Club, Barnt Green, Worcestershire, B45 8BH.
- Hickling Broad sailing Club, Hickling, Norfolk, NR12 0YJ.
- Bough Beech Sailing Club, near Sevenoaks, Kent
- Broadwater Sailing Club, Denham, Bucks
- Chew Valley Lake Sailing Club, Somerset
- Budworth Sailing Club, Cheshire
- Chipstead Sailing Club, Sevenoaks, Kent
- Elton Sailing Club , Bury, Greater Manchester
- Fishers Green Sailing Club, Waltham Abbey, Essex
- Grafham Water Sailing Club, Cambridgeshire
- Hunts Sailing Club, Cambridgeshire
- Island Barn Reservoir Sailing Club, West Molesey, London/Surrey border
- Kingsmead Sailing Club, Berkshire
- Littleton Sailing Club, Shepperton, Middlesex
- Marconi Sailing Club, Steeple, Essex
- Midland Sailing Club, Birmingham
- Rickmansworth Sailing Club, Herts
- Ripon Sailing Club, Farnham, near Knaresborough, North Yorkshire.
- South Cerney Sailing Club, Gloucestershire
- Carsington Sailing Club, Ashbourne, Derbyshire
- West Kirby Sailing Club, Merseyside
- Hollingworth Lake Sailing Club, Greater Manchester
- Frensham Pond Sailing Club, south west Surrey
- Leigh and Lowton Sailing Club, Greater Manchester
- Papercourt Sailing Club, Ripley, Surrey
