= Jet 14 =

Sailboat class

Development
- Designer: Howard Siddons
- Location: United States
- Year: 1952
- No. built: 1,150
- Builders: Siddons & Sindle, Allen Boat Company
- Role: One-design racer
- Name: Jet 14

Boat
- Displacement: 285 lb (129 kg)
- Draft: 4.17 ft (1.27 m) with centerboard down

Hull
- Type: Monohull
- Construction: Fiberglass
- LOA: 14.00 ft (4.27 m)
- LWL: 13.92 ft (4.24 m)
- Beam: 4.67 ft (1.42 m)

Hull appendages
- Keel: centerboard daggerboard
- Rudder: transom-mounted rudder

Rig
- Rig type: Bermuda rig
- J foretriangle base: 16.58 ft (5.05 m)
- E mainsail foot: 8.37 ft (2.55 m)

Sails
- Sailplan: Fractional rigged sloop Masthead sloop
- Mainsail area: 75 sq ft (7.0 m^{2})
- Jib/genoa area: 38 sq ft (3.5 m^{2})
- Spinnaker area: 150 sq ft (14 m^{2})
- Total sail area: 113 sq ft (10.5 m^{2})

Racing
- D-PN: 97.6

The Jet 14 is an American sailing dinghy that was designed by Howard Siddons as a one-design racer and first built in 1952.

The Jet 14 is a development of Uffa Fox's International 14.

== Production ==
Siddons used a set of early International 14 molds that he had acquired to create the Jet 14 hull shape, with a partial foredeck added. It was initially intended to be sailed as a catboat with just a mainsail or as a sloop, with a jib, but these days is only sailed as a sloop.

The design was initially built by Siddons & Sindle in Island Heights, New Jersey, United States, but the company went out of business and production was assumed by the Allen Boat Company of Buffalo, New York, who still produce it. Over 1,150 boats have been built.

== Design ==
The Jet 14 is a recreational sailboat, with the early boats built predominantly of wood and later boats constructed of fiberglass, with wood trim. It has a fractional sloop rig with wooden or aluminum spars. The hull has a plumb stem, a vertical transom, a transom-hung rudder controlled by a tiller and a retractable centerboard. It displaces 285 lb (129 kg).

The boat has a draft of 4.17 ft (1.27 m) with the centerboard extended and 4 in (10 cm) with it retracted, allowing beaching or ground transportation on a trailer or car roof rack.

For sailing the design is equipped with either a mainsheet traveler or a headknocker cleat mounted on the boom. The class rules were amended to allow spinnakers in 1971 and many boats have cutouts in the foredeck for spinnaker stowage, either a single cutout near the bow of one on each side of the mast. The boat's class rules restrict the cutout sizes. The design is often sailed with the spinnaker and jib hoisted unless in very light winds.

The class rules permit a lever-style boom vang and a jib window for visibility. The rules require buoyancy to be added to the wooden boats, while the fiberglass ones have built-in buoyancy tanks that make them unsinkable.

The design has a Portsmouth Yardstick racing average handicap of 97.6 and is normally raced with a crew of two sailors.

== Operational history ==
There are fleets sailed in New York state, New Jersey, Maryland, North Carolina and Ohio.

In a 1994 review Richard Sherwood wrote, "The Jet 14 ... is fast, going well to windward. The long flat run of the hull and the light weight allow her to plane."

== See also ==
- List of sailing boat types
