= Streak =

Streak or streaking may refer to:

- Streaking, running naked in a public place
- Streaking or surfactant leaching in acrylic paints
- Streaking (microbiology), a method of purifying micro-organisms
- Streak (mineralogy), the color left by a mineral dragged across a rough surface
- Streak (moth), in the family Geometridae
- Streak (film), a 2008 film
- Winning streak, consecutive wins in sport or gambling
  - Losing streak
  - The Streak (professional wrestling), a run of victories for The Undertaker at WrestleMania
  - The Streak (Easton High School Wrestling), a Pennsylvania, US, high-school streak
- Iron man (sports streak), an athlete of unusual physical endurance
- Hitting streak, in baseball, a consecutive number of games in which a player appears and gets at least one base hit.
- Dell Streak, tablet computer by Dell
- Streak camera, device to measure short optical pulses
- "The Streak" (song), a 1974 record by Ray Stevens
- Archenteron, an indentation on a blastula
- Heath Streak (1974–2023), Zimbabwean cricketer and cricket coach
- Aero-Flight Streak, a late 1940s single engine civilian aircraft
- Streak (company) is a private American company founded in 2011 and based in San Francisco, California

== See also ==
- Streaker (disambiguation)
