= Sail emblem =

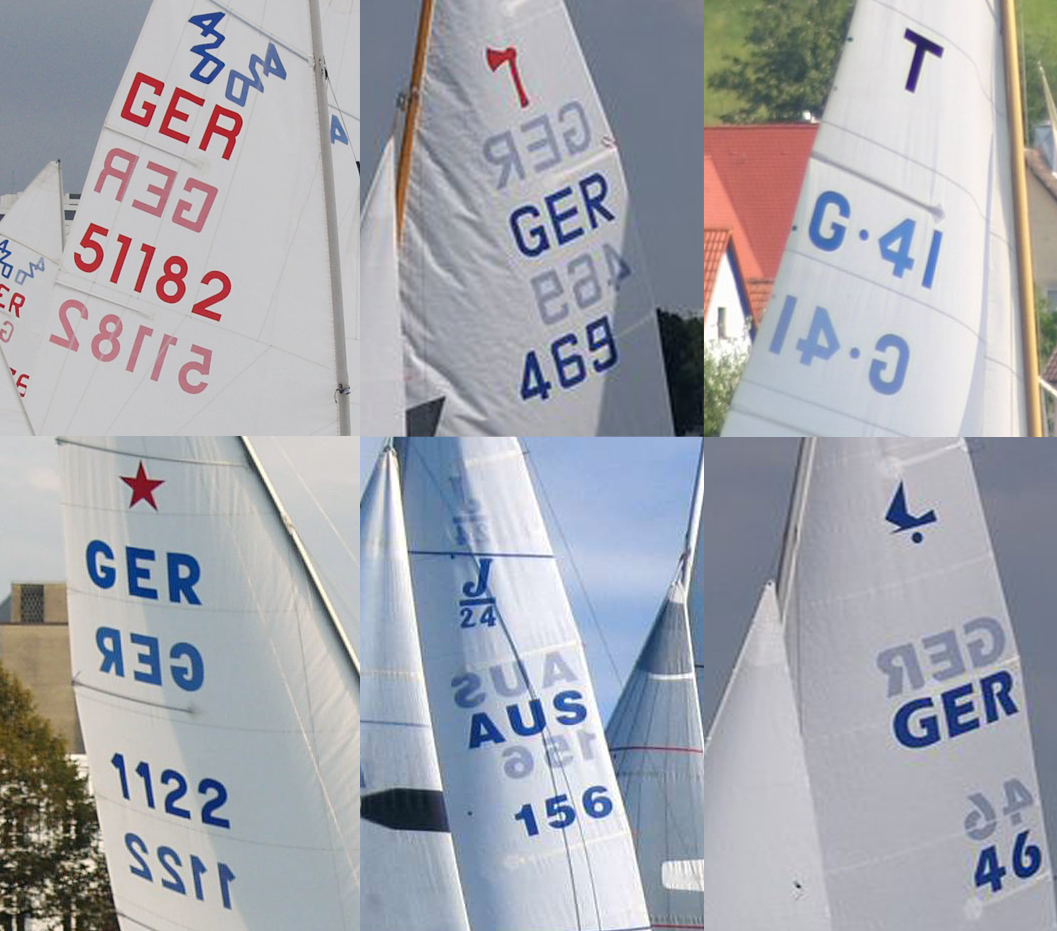
several sail emblems

A sail emblem is a figure, placed on the sail of sailing boats to mark the boat type. The figure helps to recognize boats from further distances.

It's placed above the boat's sail number and the country's sail code.

== Also check ==
- List of sail emblems
