= Cherry 16 =

Lightweight trailer sailer designed by Frank Pelin

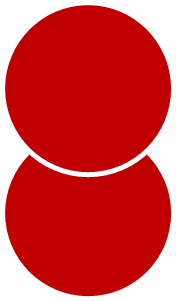
- Class Symbol

Development
- Designer: Frank Pelin
- Location: New Zealand
- No. built: 700
- Role: Cruising and racing
- Name: Cherry 16

Hull
- Type: Monohull
- Construction: Plywood
- Hull weight: 108.9 kg (240 lb)
- LOA: 4.864 m (15.96 ft)
- Beam: 2.178 m (7.15 ft)

Hull appendages
- Keel: Centerboard
- Ballast: 41 kg (90 lb)

Rig
- Rig type: Fractional rigged sloop

Sails
- Mainsail area: 7.06 m^{2} (76.0 sq ft)
- Jib/genoa area: 3.72 m^{2} (40.0 sq ft)
- Spinnaker area: 7.62 m^{2} (82.0 sq ft)

The Cherry 16 is a 4.864 m (15.96 ft) light weight trailer sailer designed by Frank Pelin in the 1970s. The hull is assembled from plywood using the stitch and glue method and can be assembled by an amateur boat builder. Plans for the construction of the Cherry 16 are still commercially available from Pelin Plans (New Zealand).
