= Scorpion (dinghy) =

British National class of sailing dinghy

Development
- Designer: T. J. Dorling
- Year: 1959

Boat
- Crew: 2

Hull
- Type: Monohull
- Hull weight: 81 kg (179 lb)
- LOA: 4.27 m (14 ft 0 in)
- Beam: 1.45 m (4 ft 9 in)

Sails
- Mainsail area: 6.7 m^{2} (72 sq ft)
- Jib/genoa area: 3.25 m^{2} (35.0 sq ft)
- Spinnaker area: 11.14 m^{2} (119.9 sq ft)

Rating
- RYA PN: 1044

The Scorpion is a British National class of a small sailing dinghy. The Scorpion is a lightweight, high-performance, two person, hiking racing dinghy. Its adjustable rig enables sailing in all weathers for crews of all weights, ages and experiences. The Scorpion was originally designed for launch and recovery through Cornish surf at Porthpean in St Austell Bay. Its 14 ft hard chine planing hull is built to strict measurements while rig controls and cockpit layout are left to personal choice.

Scorpions are built with wood, a combination of FRP and wood or all FRP. Wooden hulls have shown a competitive life of 20 years or more. Scorpions regularly win prizes at Boat Shows.

The ability to adjust the rig while sailing means that the Scorpion can be raced in most conditions. Its lightweight hull (81 kg) gives it good performance and easy handling ashore.

This National Class has a strong class association. The website at http://www.sailscorpion.co.uk allows members to keep in touch and contains event information, results, suppliers, technical articles, advice on tuning and race tactics and news.

In handicap racing the Scorpion sails off a Portsmouth Yardstick of 1053.

The dinghy was designed by T.J. Dorling in 1959.
