= Five essentials of sailing =

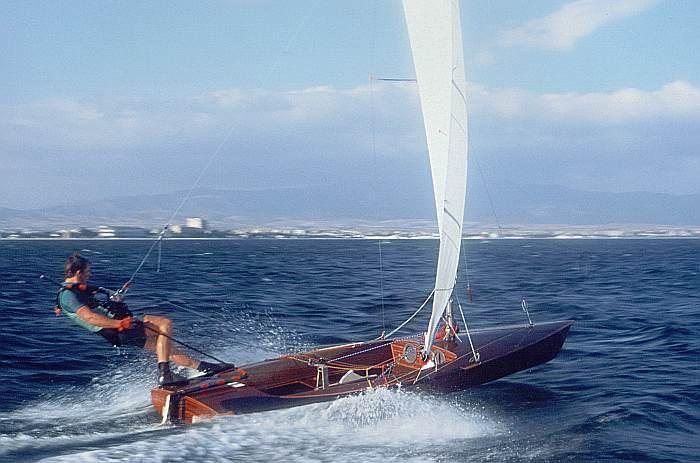
A sailor using the five essentials

The five essentials of sailing describe the five key things that a dinghy sailor uses to sail the boat as efficiently as possible. The five essentials are:

- Boat balance - which side the sailor sits on and how far out to make sure the boat sails level.
- Centreboard/daggerboard position - lifting the centreboard/daggerboard up when sailing downwind and putting it down when sailing upwind.
- Course made good (C.M.G. or Course Over Ground) - the actual route taken to achieve the journey's objecting measured over the ground. It is the resultant of the course steered and the effect on that course of any wind and tide.
- Sail trim - pulling the sail in when sailing upwind and letting it out when sailing downwind.
- Boat trim - sitting at the front of the boat when sailing upwind and at the back when sailing downwind.

== Description ==
A useful mnemonic is "Can This Boat Sail Correctly?" the first letters of which refer to Center/daggerboard, Trim, Balance, Sheet/Sail and Course. Alternatively, many sailors prefer "Can This Boat Sail Better?" the first letters of which refer to Course, Trim, Balance, Sheet/Sail and Board.
