= Streaker (dinghy) =

Type of sailing dinghy

- Class symbol

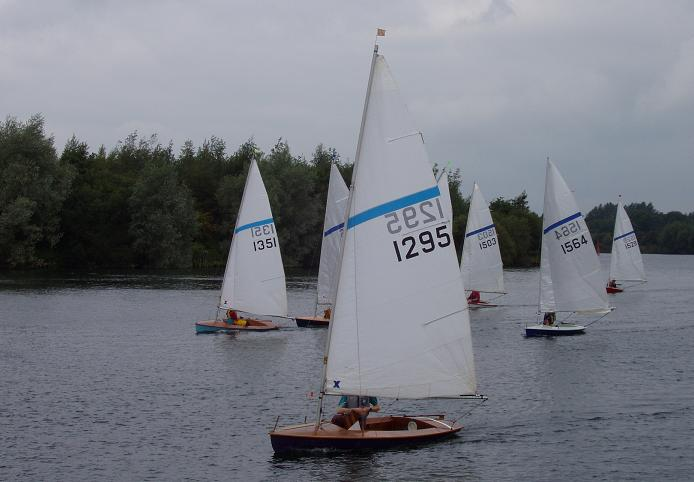
- Streakers at Ripon Sailing Club

Development
- Designer: Jack Holt
- Year: 1975
- Name: Streaker

Boat
- Crew: 1
- Draft: 1.17 m (3 ft 10 in)

Hull
- Type: Monohull
- Construction: Plywood; Fibreglass
- Hull weight: 48 kg (106 lb)
- LOA: 3.9 m (12 ft 10 in)
- Beam: 1.4 m (4 ft 7 in)

Sails
- Total sail area: 6.5 m^{2} (70 sq ft)

Racing
- D-PN: 97.7
- RYA PN: 1124

The Streaker is a type of sailing dinghy designed in 1975 by Jack Holt. It is a light (minimum weight only 48 kg) one-person boat with a uni-rig stayed sail plan. It is sailed mainly in the Britain and the Philippines, and over 2200 have been built. Initially, all boats were built of plywood, but since 1998 fibreglass and fibreglass variants have been used; now, over half of new boats are of fibreglass or composite (fibreglass and wood) construction.

The hull design is a double chine hull with little freeboard. The boat incorporates an unconventional raking daggerboard. Recent developments have included a smaller sail, known as the 'Wave Sail,' for use by lighter crews or in strong winds.
