= Leisure 17 =

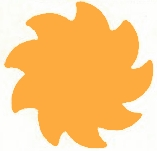
- Class symbol

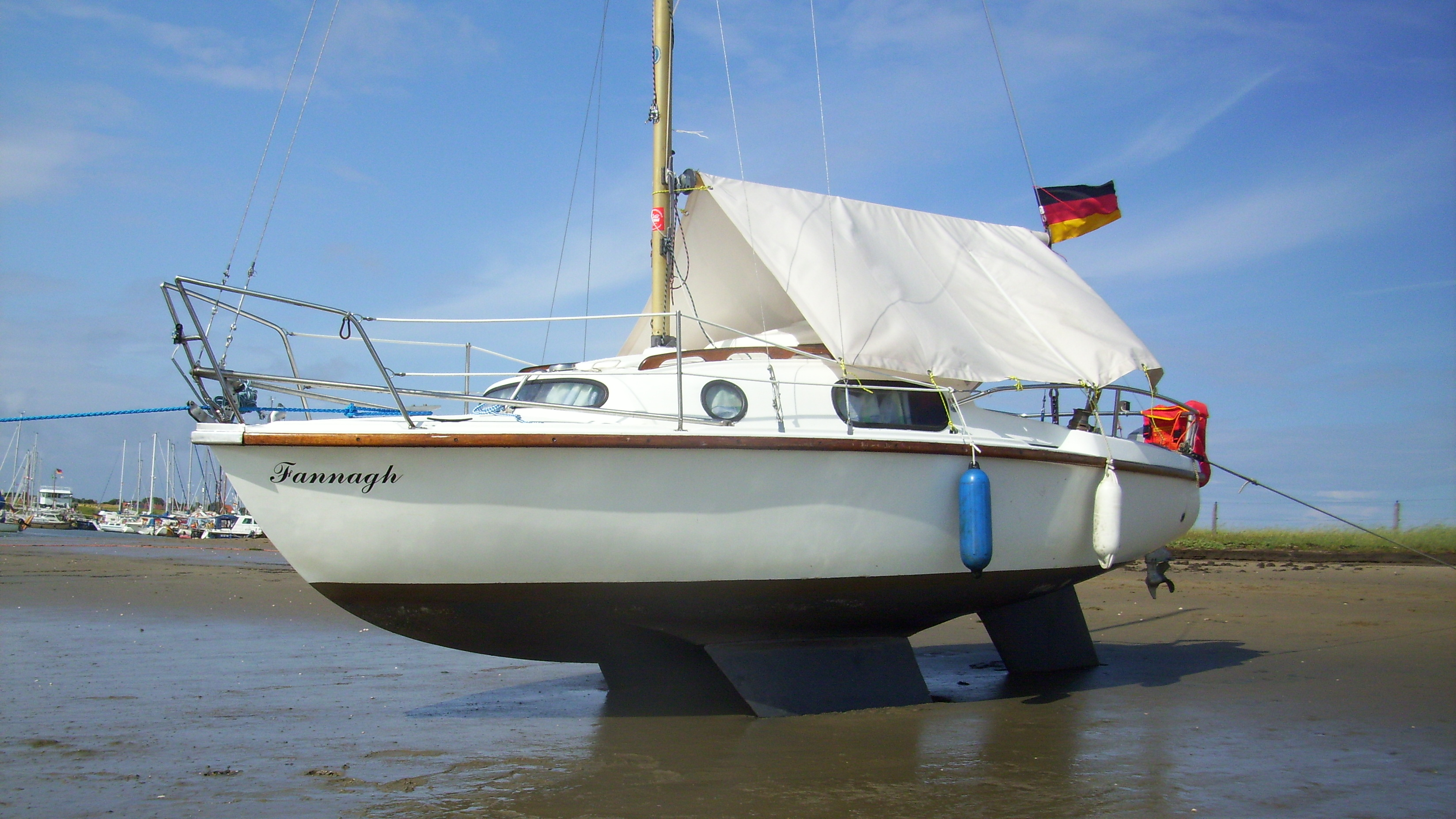

Development
- Designer: Arhur C. Howard
- Location: Stansted, Essex, UK
- Year: 1967
- No. built: 3000
- Brand: Leisure
- Builder: Cobramold Ltd.
- Name: Leisure 17

Boat
- Crew: 2-4
- Displacement: 670 kg (1,480 lb)

Hull
- Construction: Glass Reinforced Plastic
- LOA: 5.18 m (17.0 ft)
- LWL: 4.27 m (14.0 ft)
- Beam: 2.13 m (7.0 ft)
- Engine: Outboard

Sails
- Mainsail area: 6.1 m^{2} (66 sq ft)
- Jib/genoa area: 7.9 m^{2} (85 sq ft)
- Spinnaker area: 19.2 m^{2} (207 sq ft)
- Gennaker area: 9.3 m^{2} (100 sq ft)

Racing
- Class association: 17

Leisure 17 is one of a series of cruisers manufactured by the British boatbuilder Cobramold Ltd. until the company went into liquidation in 1980, the moulds were then taken over by Brinecraft Ltd. The boat is capable of offshore sailing.

== History ==
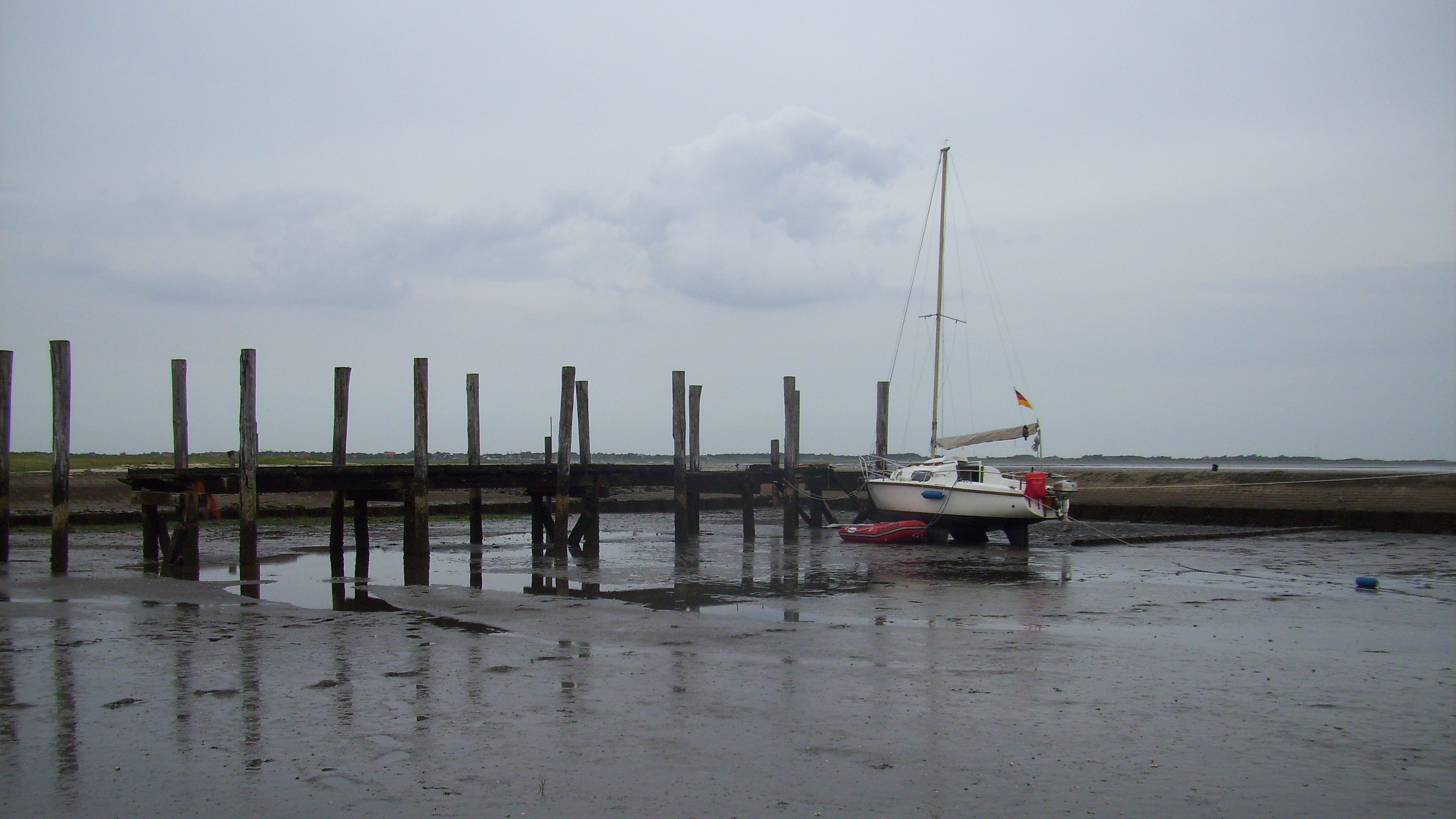
Leisure 17 in Spiekeroog

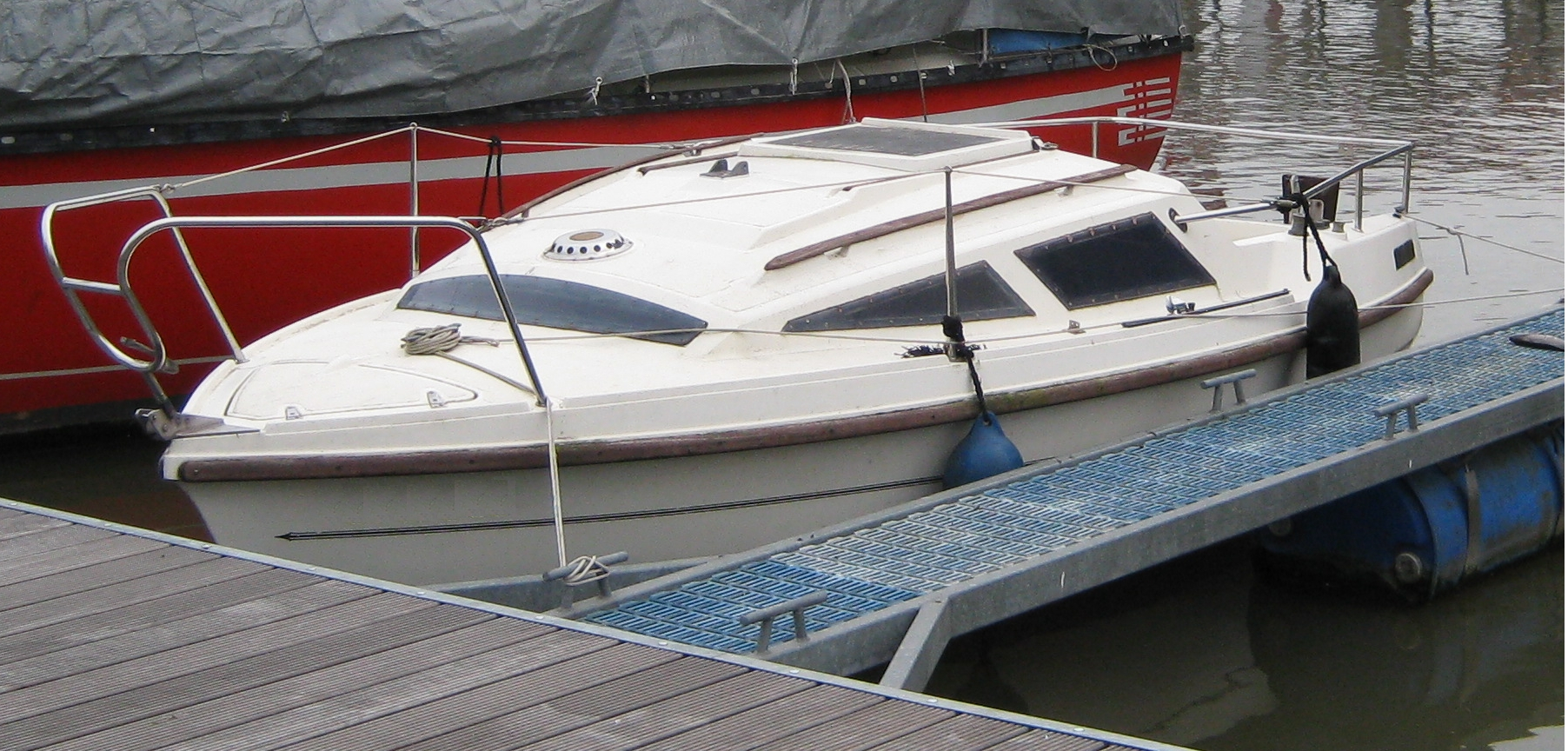
Leisure 17 SL

The Leisure 17 was built between 1967 and 1996. A total of between 3000 and 4500 units were built, the exact numbers are not known due to the company records being lost in a fire in 1990.

Designed to be a family cruiser, the hull is made from Glass-reinforced plastic and came in two designs: a double-keel version and a fin-keel version. The keels of both versions are made from cast iron. Since the double-keel version has a quite low draft (0,65 m), it is popular in tidal waters.

Later, the Leisure 17 SL came in a new shape, designed by Brian Meerloo. This used the same hull but had a redesigned upper deck, giving a larger cabin.

== Deck ==
The cockpit provides space for up to four persons. A locker is placed between the cockpit and the stern. The stanchions and guard rail gives the Leisure 17 the appearance of a bigger cruiser and provide fixing points for protective fenders. A small pipe placed at the bow leads to the anchor chain locker.

== Sails ==
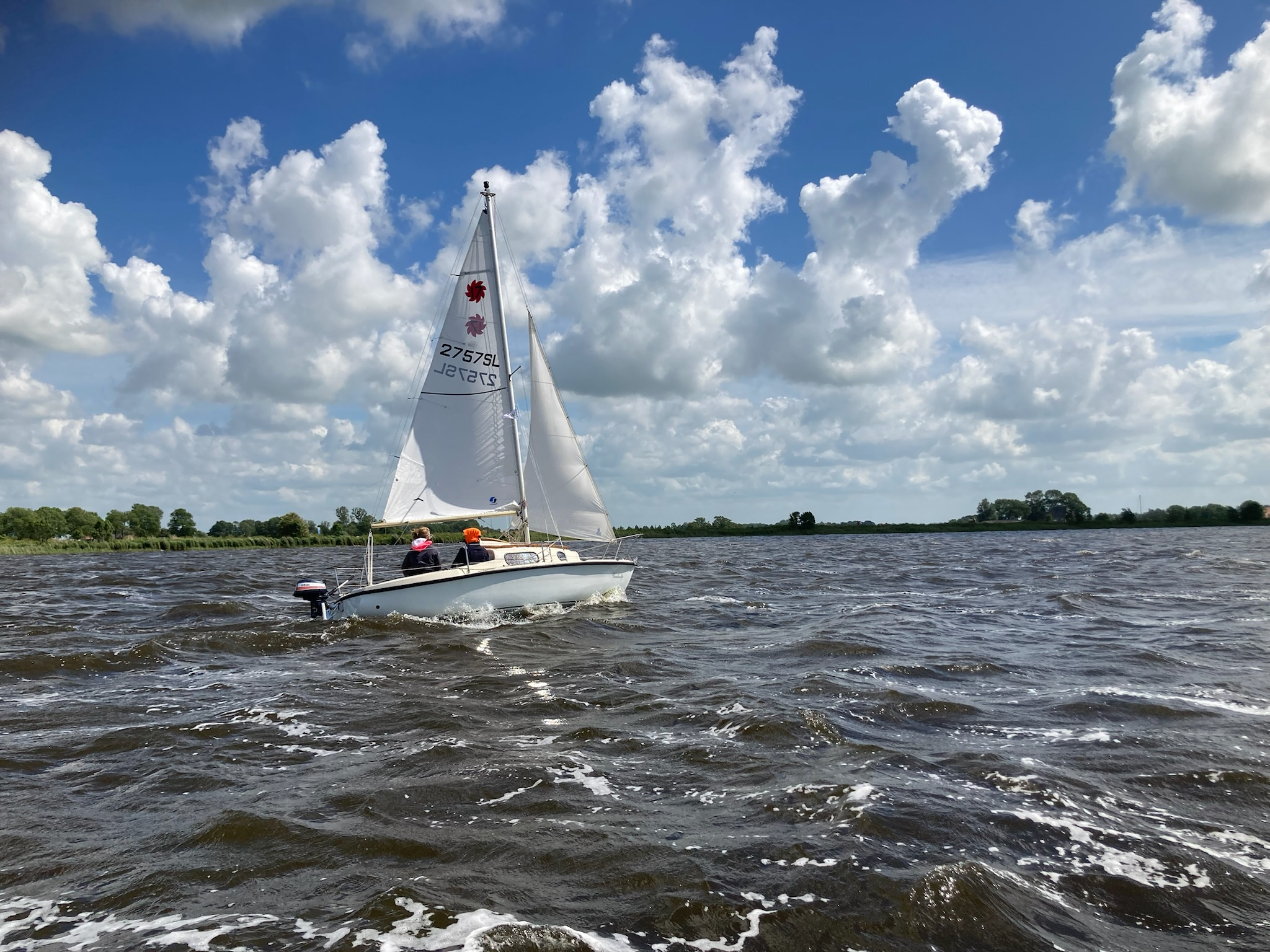
Leisure 17 under Sail

Sail areas for the Leisure 17
Sail	Sail area (m²)	Sail area (ft²)
Main sail	7.7	83
Genoa	9.3	100
Working jib	6.0	65
No. 1 jib	7.9	85
Storm jib	3.7	40
No. 1 spinnaker	19.3	208
No. 2 spinnaker	13.9	150

== Mechanical Propulsion ==
Most Leisure 17 are equipped with an outboard. 3.68 kW (5 hp) is sufficient to reach hull speed.

== Cabin ==
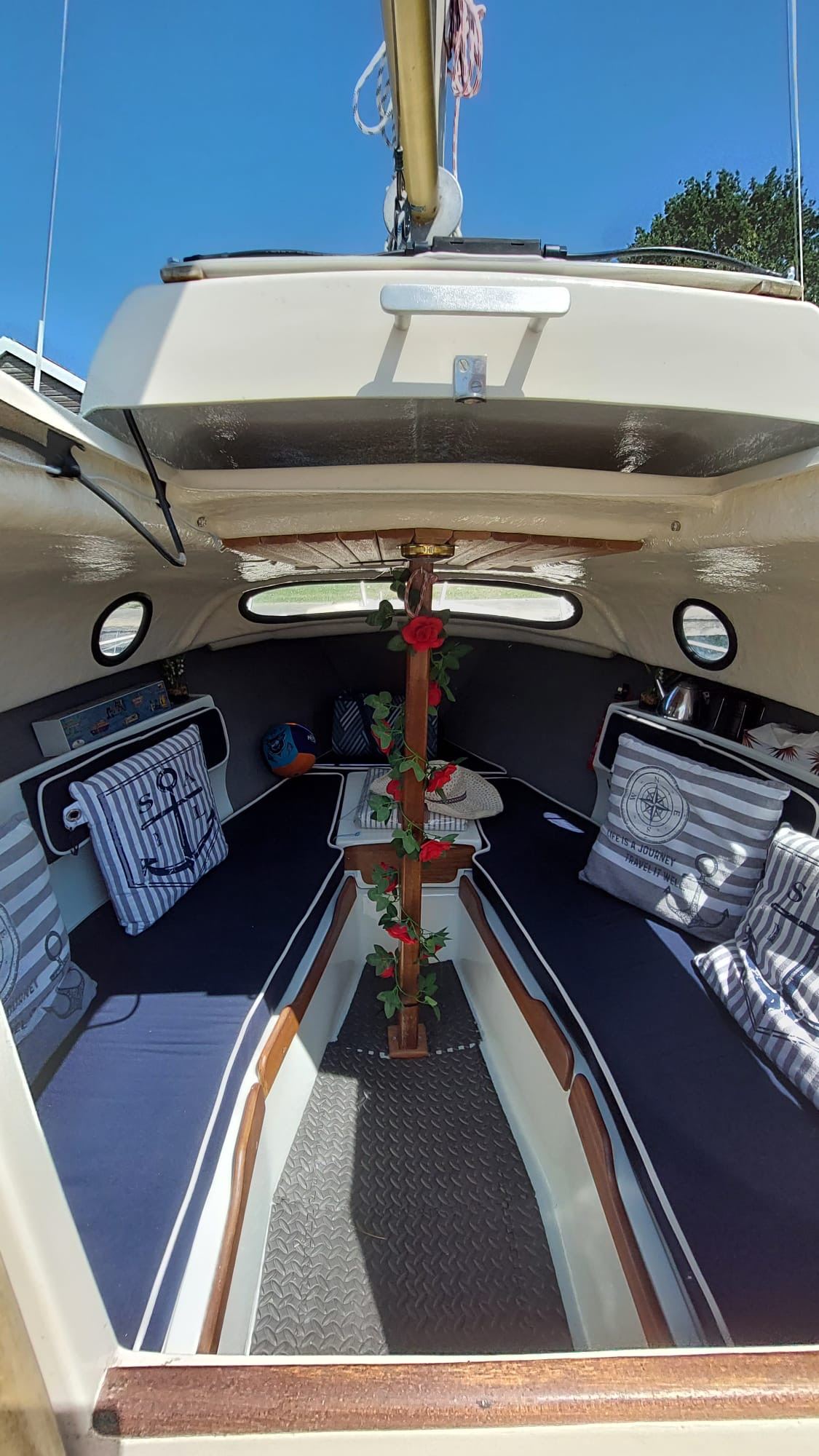
Cabin of a Leisure 17

The cabin is just a single room. The seats placed in the saloon provide two bunks. Two additional bunks can be found below the cockpit seats. The Leisure 17 was designed as a 4-person cruiser, but just two crew will fill the available storage and sleeping space. Although the boat is only 17 feet overall, it is equipped with a small galley and a chemical toilet.

== Point of interest ==
The Leisure 17 is a seagoing cruiser. The sea-keeping abilities of the yacht were proved by John Adam, who crossed the Atlantic with his Leisure 17 in 1967 within 32 days.

In March 2012, Turkish sailor Noyan Culum, left Bodrum in Turkey and sailed single-handed over eight months to Plymouth in the UK, via Gibraltar and crossing the Bay of Biscay.
