= National E =

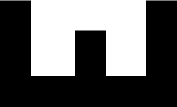
- Class symbol

Development
- Designer: Jack Holt
- Location: London, UK
- Year: 1962
- Design: One-Design
- Role: intermediate/senior, racing

Boat
- Crew: 2
- Trapeze: Single

Hull
- Type: Monohull
- Construction: GRP; Plywood
- LOA: 4.58 metres (15 ft 0 in)
- Beam: 1.6 metres (5 ft 3 in)

Hull appendages
- Keel: Centerboard

Rig
- Rig type: Bermuda
- Mast height: 6.2 metres (20 ft 4 in)

Sails
- Mainsail area: 8.9 square metres (96 sq ft)
- Jib/genoa area: 3.6 square metres (39 sq ft)
- Spinnaker area: 16.25 square metres (174.9 sq ft)

Racing
- D-PN: 113.0

The National E (formerly Lazy E) is a two-person intermediate to senior sailing dinghy complete with main, jib, spinnaker and trapeze. It was designed by Jack Holt in 1962 as a fast stable boat. It encapsulates experience gained from his earlier designs of the GP14 and the Enterprise. It has a strong following in Australia with national titles held annually and over 560 sail numbers issued to date.
