= Mirror (dinghy) =

International racing sailing class

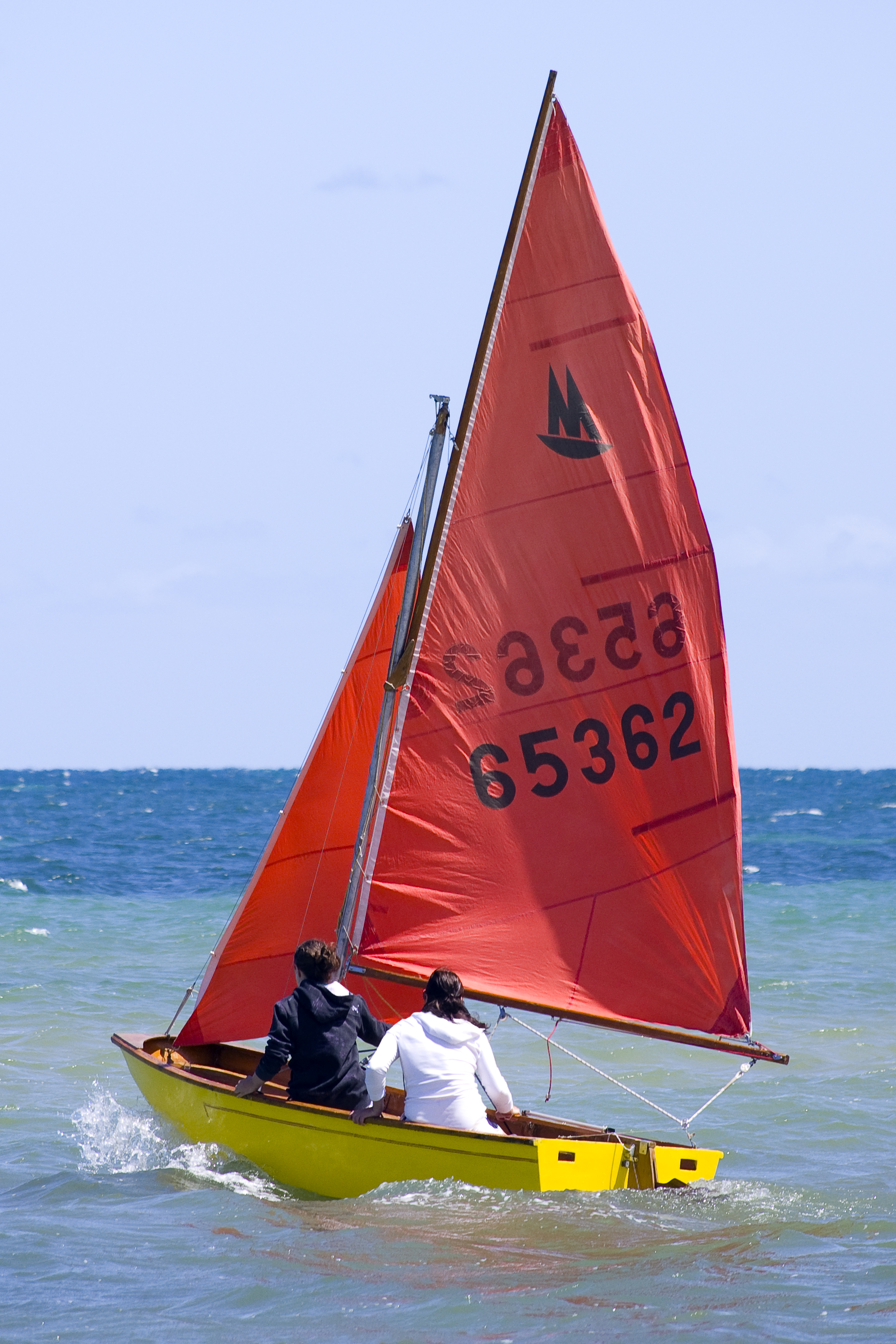
- A mirror leaving the beach

Boat
- Crew: 2
- Draft: 0.70 m (2 ft 4 in)

Hull
- Hull weight: 45.5 kg (100 lb)
- LOA: 3.30 m (10 ft 10 in)
- LWL: 2.95 m (9 ft 8 in)
- Beam: 1.39 m (4 ft 7 in)

Sails
- Mainsail area: 4.6 m^{2} (50 sq ft)
- Jib/genoa area: 1.9 m^{2} (20 sq ft)
- Spinnaker area: 4.4 m^{2} (47 sq ft)

Rating
- D-PN: 113.1

The Mirror is a type of popular sailing dinghy with more than 70,000 built.

The Mirror was named after the Daily Mirror, a UK newspaper with a largely working-class distribution. The Mirror was from the start promoted as an affordable boat, and as a design it has done a great deal to make dinghy sailing accessible to a wide audience. Although most popular in the UK, Mirrors are also sailed in other countries, notably Australia, Ireland, Sweden, Canada, the Netherlands, South Africa, New Zealand, the Philippines and the United States.

== Design ==
The Mirror was designed by Jack Holt and TV do-it-yourself expert Barry Bucknell in 1962. It employed a novel construction method where sheets of marine plywood are held together with copper stitching and fibreglass tape. This is called tack and tape or stitch and glue construction. Buoyancy is provided by four independent integral chambers rather than by bags. It was originally designed to be built with simple tools and little experience, and this meant that the design was quite simple. For example, the characteristic 'pram' front reduces the need for the more complicated curved wooden panels and joinery needed for a pointed bow, and a daggerboard is used instead of a hinged centreboard. The result is a robust, versatile and fairly light boat that can be easily maintained and repaired, and can also be launched into the water very quickly from storage or transport. Although most experienced sailors would carry a paddle rather than oars, if necessary it rows well. If the transom is strengthened, an outboard motor can be used for propulsion.

The original rig was a Gunter rig, but in 2006 the class rules were changed to allow a single mast and an alloy boom. Although a Bermudan sloop rig has now been introduced for the Mirror, the original Gunter rig (with a gaff that effectively doubles the height of the mast) meant that all the spars could be packed inside the hull for easy storage or transportation. This same space saving is still available with the Bermudan rig by using an optional two-piece aluminium mast. Mirrors can be sailed without a jib by moving the mast into an optional forward step and moving the shroud attachment points forward. However, in this configuration it can be difficult to tack, so it would mainly be used to de-power the boat for beginners. Most single handers retain the mast in the standard position and handle the jib as well: because of the Mirror's small size, this is quite manageable.

Mirror class rules permit the use of a spinnaker. This may also be used by single handers as well – although flying a main, jib and spinnaker single-handed sounds complex, it is quite manageable with a bit of practice.

Mainsail controls permitted by the class are downhaul (Cunningham), outhaul and kicking strap (vang). The Jib tack fixing may also be adjustable while sailing allowing changes in jib luff tension and tack height.

Richard Creagh-Osborne commented in the Dinghy Yearbook 1964 (pub. Adlard Coles) that the Mirror 'was one of the two best one design dinghies drawn by Jack Holt - the other being the Heron'. Initially the design met with a considerable degree of scepticism from the established boating fraternity due to its unconventional design and construction (actually pioneered by Ken Littledyke for canoe construction) but Creagh-Osbourn and Beecher Moore were two of the highly respected pundits of the dinghy scene who were far sighted enough to see the value of the design, and immediately supported it. Within a few years its dramatically lower cost (only just over half the cost of the Heron or Gull) and massive promotion by the Daily Mirror (under the guidance of a dedicated team headed by Victor Shaw) transformed the boat into the most popular two man dinghy in terms of sales per annum worldwide. This was sadly relatively short lived, and the imposition of 25% VAT in the late 1970s on boats, killed the dinghy market and the sales of the Mirror - it never really recovered, and by the time the economy improved, its franchise of practical post war kit builders had been replaced by kids who had little understanding of the most basic woodworking skills and even less interest - it remains popular but not to the extent and enthusiasm that fostered the book 'Mirrormania' in 1976.

== Racing ==
Despite not being a particularly fast dinghy, the Mirror is used for one-design racing. Because of the number that have been made, it is possible to find other Mirror sailors to race against in countries where the boat is present. The fleet of similar boats, combined with the Mirror's stability and complexity for its size, make it a boat used for learning racing skills. It is a UK Olympic pathway boat, and sailors have learned in Mirrors. Mirrors are raced globally.

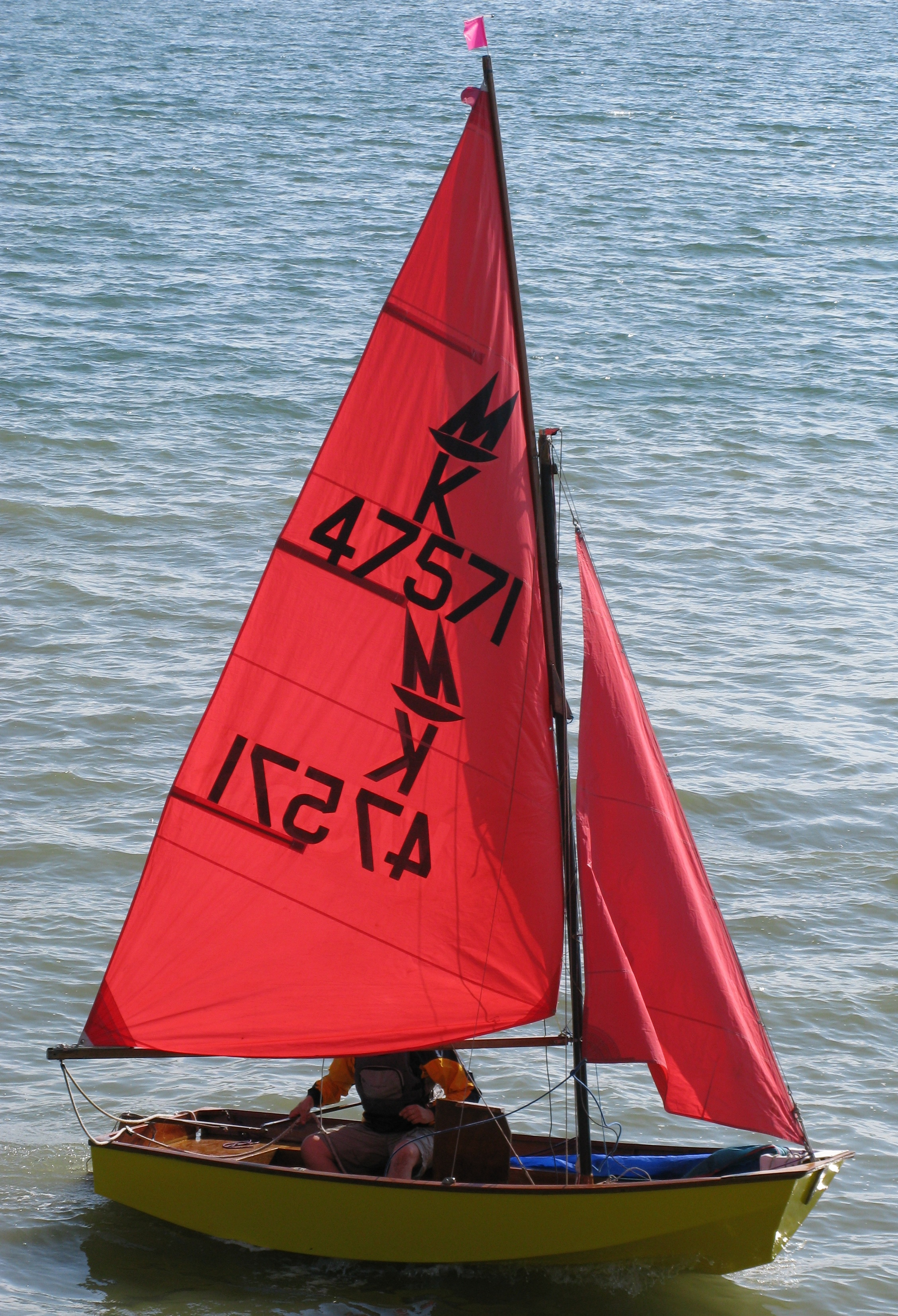

The Mirror World Championship is contested biennially by the nations of Ireland, the UK, the Republic of South Africa, Canada, New Zealand, Sweden, Netherlands and Australia. Ireland has dominated the event over the past decade, winning the championship in 1999 (Marty Moloney and Revelin Minihane), 2001 (Peter Bayly and William Atkinson), 2003 (Chris Clayton and Craig Martin) and 2005 (Ross Kearney and Adam Mc Cullough) although the last 2 world championships have been won by British pairings. Anna Mackenzie and Holly Scott from team GBR were the first all-female team to win the title in 2007 which was contested in Port Elizabeth, South Africa. Andy and Tom Smith also from Great Britain won the event in 2009, in Pwllheli, Wales.

Former world champion Ross Kearney won both the 2010 Mirror European championships at Sligo Yacht Club, and the 2011 Mirror World Championship held in Albany, Western Australia, with current crew Max Odell.

The 2013 World Championships were hosted at Lough Derg Yacht Club in Ireland.

The biggest event in the UK each year is Abersoch Mirror week, held in North Wales at S.C.Y.C.(www.scyc.co.uk). Abersoch Mirror week is an event for all sailors, from the very young and first time sailors to the mega keen adult, with boats from the 60s to brand new. In 2013 there were more Mirrors than the Nationals. In 2015 the 2015 Nationals were held alongside Abersoch Mirror week.

The UK Portsmouth Yardstick number for single handed racing is 1369, for racing with two crew the UK Portsmouth Yardstick number is 1383.

== Cruising ==
Although in the racing world Mirrors are associated with youths and beginners, as a cruising/pleasure boat they are very practical for adults, even experienced and veteran sailors where modern racing dinghies are not practical. Compared to racing dinghies which tend to have low gunwales, are a wet ride, capsize easily, and cannot be rowed or motored; the Mirror is more like a traditional boat with relative comfort inside the cockpit, plenty of room for stowage, and both the crew and gear remain dry in light winds. In heavy winds, the hull form is very stable and this makes them very reliable for the more adventurous cruiser, knowing that capsize is less likely than racing boats of comparable size. Their small size and light weight means they are easy to handle, launch and recover, transport, tow, and store on land. They can be launched and recovered by hand from inhospitable places where cars and tractors are unable to go (eg deep mud estuaries, large beaches with gentle gradients, etc), which gives them an advantage over bigger dinghies. Their ability to take oars and an engine means that the cruising dinghy sailor can be self sufficient without relying on rescue boats in case of problems with the sails or rigging. With the right knowledge and equipment, Mirrors are suitable for cruising on rivers, lakes, and coastal waters; solo or in groups. Mainly used for day sailing but sometimes for multi-day passages, with boom tents allowing camping on the boat, or camping gear stowed to be used for camping ashore.

One has even been sailed and rowed singlehanded from Ellesmere to the Black Sea. Because there are so many of them around, others can be found to sail with. In bad weather, Mirrors can be handled, though stronger winds may overwhelm them. Their seaworthiness is excellent for their size.

The Mirror with the sail No 1 (i.e. the first ever mirror) may be seen at the National Maritime Museum Cornwall.

== Other designs ==
Three other dinghy designs are also associated with the 'Mirror' name: the (Mirror) Miracle of 3.86 metres (12 ft 8 in) length, the Marauder (Mirror 14) (4.42 metres [14 ft 6 in]), and the Mirror 16 (4.90 metres [16 ft 1 in]). Of these, the Marauder was designed by Peter Milne, while the other two were Jack Holt designs. The Miracle also sports a squared-off 'transom bow' (albeit smaller than that of the smaller Mirror), while the two larger designs enjoy a more traditional bow treatment. All of them were conceived as potential home-build projects, though the Marauder is a less obviously hard-chine design.

The rather larger GRP 'Mirror Offshore' (a van de Stadt design), possibly in a similar spirit, was intended to enable an introduction to larger boats within a limited budget.
