= Heron (dinghy) =

Boat type

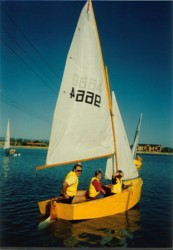
- Learning to sail in a Heron, West Lakes, South Australia

Boat
- Crew: 2 (max)

Hull
- Hull weight: 63.7 kg (140 lb)
- LOA: 3.429 m (11.25 ft)
- Beam: 1.372 m (4 ft 6.0 in)

Sails
- Mainsail area: 4.78 m^{2} (51.5 sq ft)
- Jib/genoa area: Jib: 1.72 m^{2} (18.5 sq ft); Genoa: 2.83 m^{2} (30.5 sq ft)
- Spinnaker area: 6.36 m^{2} (68.5 sq ft)

Racing
- D-PN: 120.0
- RYA PN: 1346

The Heron Dinghy is a dinghy designed by Jack Holt of the United Kingdom as the Yachting World Cartopper (YW Cartopper). The Heron dinghy was designed to be built by a home handyman out of marine ply over a timber frame, but can now also be constructed from marine ply using a stitch and glue technique or from fibreglass. Modern dinghies will usually have built in buoyancy tanks; older craft will have bags or retrofitted tanks.

Since about 1980 boats have been increasingly made of fibreglass, although the Australian association has approved stitch and glue construction .

The Heron is sailed in the UK and Australia and New Zealand, with a few others spread around the world. UK class rules vary slightly from the Australian Rules. In the UK a spinnaker is permitted and a larger genoa can be used. The UK also permits the use of different rudder shapes and a Bermudan Mast. Other more minor differences exist between the rules. The Heron cartop dinghy was popular in Ireland from the late 1950s until the arrival of the Mirror which was lighter, easier to build, and had built in buoyancy.

They are mainly used as adult/child racing dinghies. For state and national titles the Olympic triangle course is often used.

The Heron has a Portsmouth Yardstick of 1346 when sailed single handed. In the US Sailing scheme it has a D-PN of 120.0.

Over 10,500 Heron sail numbers have been issued since the design first appeared in the late 1950s.

The first Heron, No 1 Flook, still exists and is now owned by the National Maritime Museum Cornwall.
