= Hornet (dinghy) =

High performance dinghy

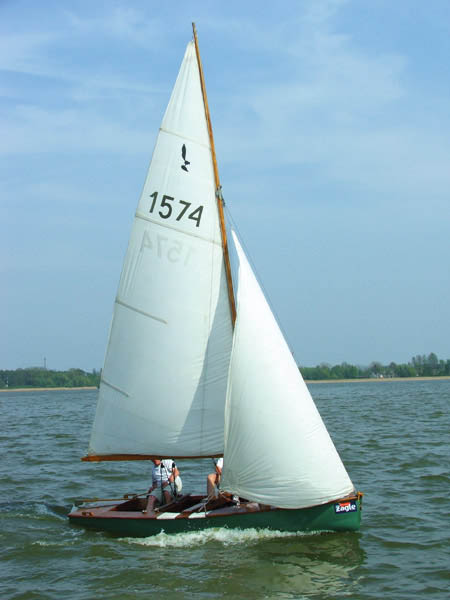
- A Hornet sailing with the older smaller main and jib, with sliding seat, on a port tack.

Development
- Designer: Jack Holt
- Year: 1952
- Name: Hornet

Boat
- Crew: 2
- Trapeze: Yes

Hull
- Type: Monohull
- Construction: Plywood, composite or GRP
- Hull weight: 61 kilograms (134 lb)
- LOA: 4.87 metres (16.0 ft)
- Beam: 1.64 metres (5.4 ft)

Hull appendages
- Keel: Centerboard

Sails
- Upwind sail area: 9.75 square metres (104.9 sq ft)

Racing
- RYA PN: 973

The Hornet dinghy is a 16-foot-high performance dinghy designed by Jack Holt in 1952.

It is sailed by two people, with either a sliding seat ('plank') or a single trapeze, or where neither plank nor trapeze is fitted, by three people. The Hornet is a restricted class meaning that its external hull measurements, sailing weight, sail measurements, and mast dimensions and weights are controlled, but the hull's interior layout, centreboard and rudder have few restrictions. Permitted materials are restricted in order to control costs.

== Development ==
The Hornet was originally designed by Holt for inexpensive homebuilding using marine plywood bent over a simple frame, along the lines of his popular 14 foot GP14 design. During the 1960s composite and GRP boats were supplied by various builders, such as Doe, Baker, Dingwall, etc. but, due to large flat panels of GRP being more flexible (or heavier) than marine ply, those were generally not always competitive with the best wooden boats from the likes of Rigden, Gibbens, Cory et al.

During the 1970s and early 1980s the class was updated progressively by the adoption of the trapeze, larger sails, and the phased reduction of overall weight limits over several years. Performance was revolutionised in 1973 by the introduction of No.1782 "Revolution" by Malcolm Goodwin, which was significantly faster than conventional Hornets. The hull shape was hydrodynamically optimised taking advantage of permitted tolerances, being built over a much stiffer frame to control its shape and stiffen its structure. Among other improvements an effective gybing centreboard was developed. Two other boats, Super Zonka and Short Circuit, were built at the same time, with gybing boards.

Goodwin subsequently productionised his design and manufactured it in various forms: self assembly kits, part finished hulls, or finished boats.

Tim Baker subsequently built composite boats from a Goodwin mould.

Richard Lovett developed an interpretation of the new hull shape, and built two boats still known for their speed.

Tim Coombe went on to build several more boats from the same frames.

In 2000, a new deck mould was developed, and Speed Sails, and later Bob Hoare, built around 10 new boats in FRP.

In 2008, a new skiff-style deck mould was developed, and 5 boats built with this new space frame layout.

The current generation of Hornets are being built by SP Boats.

The latest sail number is 2190, but the longevity of the class is illustrated by the fact that 20-year-old boats are still winning the championships.

The Hornet celebrated its 60th anniversary in 2012.

The Hornet was adopted by Poland as the trainer for the Olympic Flying Dutchman dinghy class.

The main Hornet fleets are in the south of England and in Poland.

- LOA : 4.87 metres (16.0 ft)
- Beam : 1.64 metres (5.4 ft)
- Sail Area : 9.75 square metres (104.9 sq ft)
- Dry Hull weight (min) : 61 kilograms (134 lb)
- All up weight (min) : 126 kilograms (278 lb)
- Portsmouth number : 973
