= Yachting World =

British magazine

- Cover of the December 2024 issue
- Editor: Elaine Bunting
- Categories: Yachting
- Frequency: Monthly
- Circulation: 11,013 (Jan–Dec 2023)
- Publisher: Future plc
- Founded: 1894
- Country: United Kingdom
- Language: English
- Website: http://www.yachtingworld.com/

Yachting World is a monthly English language magazine published since 1894. Owned by Future plc, it features articles on sailing and yachting, specialising in ocean and offshore cruising and racing events and techniques. It is published in the UK, but has an international readership, with some 65% of readers outside the UK.

The editor is Helen Fretter.
