= 145 (dinghy) =

Sailing dinghy

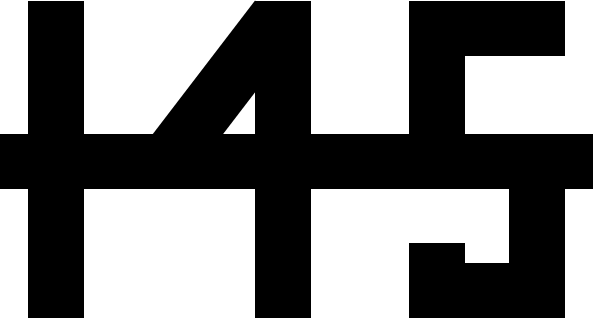
- Class symbol

Development
- Location: Australia
- Year: 1979
- Design: One-Design
- Role: Intermediate-senior trainer, racing

Boat
- Crew: 2
- Trapeze: Single

Hull
- Type: Monohull
- Construction: GRP; Plywood; Foam Sandwich
- LOA: 4.47 metres (14 ft 8 in)
- Beam: 1.43 metres (4 ft 8 in)

Hull appendages
- Keel: Centerboard

Rig
- Rig type: Fractional rigged sloop

Racing
- D-PN: 113.0

The 145 is a 14 ft 8 in (4.47 m) two person intermediate sailing dinghy complete with main, jib, spinnaker and trapeze. The class is a lengthened version of the 125 class of sailing dingy. The 145 class had a following within Australia, although not as strong as its smaller cousin. Eventually, the class fell out of popularity and the class associations disbanded in the early to mid 2000s. Some examples are still raced around Australia.
