= Barry Bucknell =

English television personality

Robert "Barry" Barraby Bucknell (26 January 1912, Hampstead, London – 21 February 2003, St Mawes, Cornwall, aged 91) was an English TV presenter who popularised Do It Yourself (DIY) in the United Kingdom.

Bucknell was educated at the William Ellis School, Camden, and served an apprenticeship with Daimler, after which he joined his father's building and electrical firm in St Pancras, London. He was a conscientious objector in the Second World War, working in the National Fire Service in London during the Blitz and later. In the 1950s he served as a Labour Party member of St Pancras Borough Council.

== Home improvement shows ==
After his first child was born, Bucknell was asked by a BBC radio producer to give a talk on becoming a parent. It was after this that he was asked to demonstrate home improvements on TV.

=== About the Home ===
Initially, he was one of a number of experts answering viewers' questions, but his manner, both magisterial and welcoming, was so much liked he was given his own spot on About the Home in 1956, demonstrating tasks such as putting up shelves and making a tool box.

=== Barry Bucknell's Do It Yourself ===
In the late 1950s he began presenting the long running BBC TV series Barry Bucknell's Do It Yourself which at its peak attracted seven million viewers. The programmes were presented live and, despite rehearsing his projects at home with his wife timing him, occasionally resulted in on-screen mishaps with Bucknell saying "This is how not to do it!"

=== Bucknell's House ===
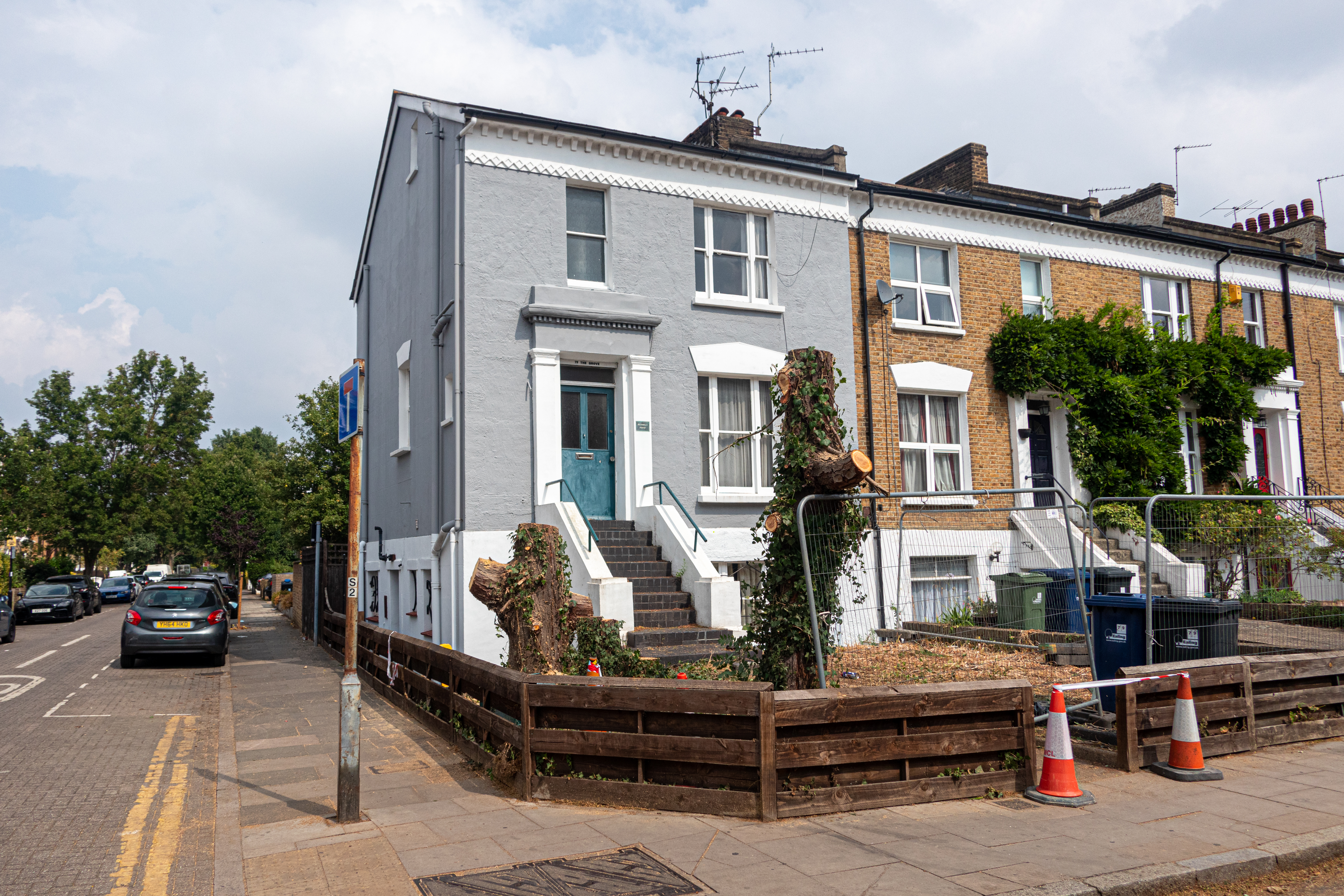
Bucknell's House, 79 The Grove, Ealing, London, W5 5LL.

The 1962 series Bucknell's House followed a 39-week BBC project renovating a house, bought for £2,250, in Ealing. According to the 2008 Channel 4 programme How TV Changed Britain the house was now said to be worth £800,000.

=== Other television appearances ===
Bucknell appeared in a public information film Energy Sense is Common Sense in 1976.

=== Criticism ===
Bucknell often demonstrated techniques to 'modernise' older properties, most typically using cheap materials including hardboard and plywood to cover up architectural detail such as period doors and fireplaces, which at that time were considered unfashionable. This earned Bucknell the moniker 'Bodger' Bucknell. By the 1990s, some critics argued that he was largely responsible for millions of home owners altering their properties to a style that, in turn, is now considered dated again.

== Sailing interest ==
From the mid-1960s Bucknell became increasingly involved in sailing and he and Jack Holt designed the popular Mirror Dinghy. He also designed a two-man canoe for the Royal National Lifeboat Institution, a catamaran for his wife and himself which he moored next to his house in St Mawes, Cornwall.
