= Stitch and glue =

Boat building method

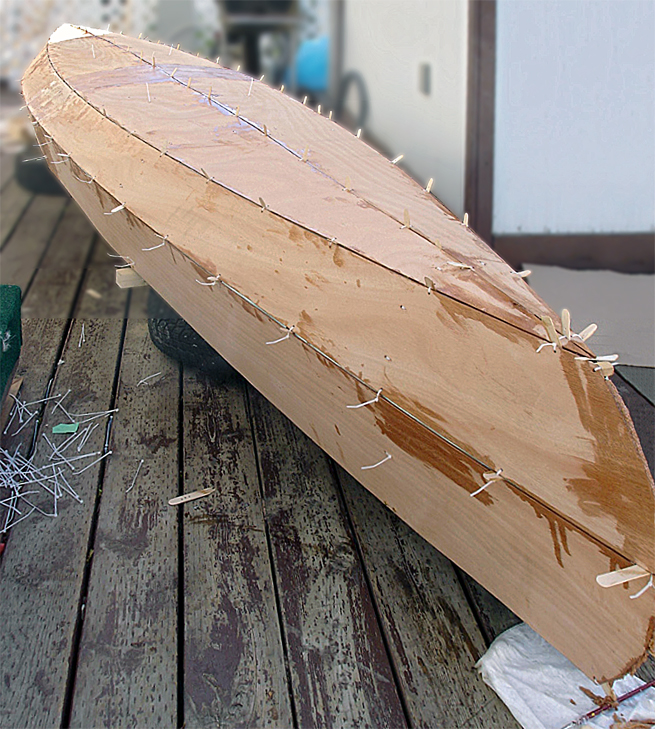
A stitched canoe hull under construction.

Stitch and glue is a simple boat building method which uses plywood panels temporarily stitched together, typically with wire or zip-ties, and glued together permanently with epoxy resin. This type of construction can eliminate much of the need for frames or ribs. Plywood panels are cut to shape and stitched together to form an accurate hull shape without the need for forms or special tools. This technique is also called "tack and tape", or "stitch and tape". Seams are reinforced with fiberglass tape and thickened epoxy.

== History ==
The stitch and glue method was developed by woodwork teacher Ken Littledyke for the manufacture of canoes, later sold as the 'Kayel' in plan and kit form, using plywood panels joined by fiberglass tape and resin. The technique was then popularised by the first TV do it yourself (DIY) expert, Barry Bucknell, in about 1964.

The method was adopted, substituting copper wire ties rather than fishing line as in the early Littledyke examples, for the construction of the Mirror Dinghy in 1962. The Mirror is so named because the design was sponsored by The Daily Mirror newspaper, a fact reflected by the historically red sails. The Daily Mirror apparently wanted to bring cheap sailing to the masses. As such, unlike other construction techniques of the day, which required specialist skills and tools, stitch and glue was supposed to put boat-building within the reach of the average member of the public.

Although stitch and glue is similar to a traditional form of boatbuilding from northern Europe, particularly Lapland, called "sewn boats", it is not known if Littledyke's development of the stitch and glue methods was influenced by that technique.

In the United States stitch and glue boat building was popularized in the mid-1980s largely through Harold "Dynamite" Payson's articles in WoodenBoat magazine and books on building "instant boats" designed by Phil Bolger. These boats were constructed of plywood with seams filleted with fiberglass tape and could be built by DIY amateurs of modest skill and relatively meagre resources.

== Technique ==
Stitch and glue joint crossection.

The technique consists of stitching together plywood panels with some sort of wire or other suitable device, such as cable ties or duct tape and staples. All these methods of stitching or suturing the plywood panels of the hull are simple methods of clamping the hull parts together before they are permanently welded or fused by epoxy and fiberglass tape joints. Once the epoxy sets solid in most cases the stitches or other clamping structures are removed leaving only the fused plywood panels behind. Copper wire is popular because the wires can be twisted tighter or looser to precisely adjust fit, and because it is easy to sand after gluing, and it is suitable in a marine environment if left in place, but mild steel electric fencing wire can be used just as easily and then can be removed completely from the hull structure. To join, the cut panels are drilled with small holes along the joining edges and stitched. Once together, the joint is glued, usually with thickened epoxy and fiberglass on the inside of the hull.

On the outside of the hull, the wire is snipped and the joints filled and sanded over. The outside of the joint, or entire hull, may be fiberglassed and glued as well, providing additional strength. The combination of fiberglass tape and epoxy glue results in a composite material providing an extremely strong joint, something close to 8-10 times the strength of fastenings and timber framing that might have been used in more conventional plywood construction.

An alternative is to use dabs of thickened epoxy in between the "stitching" to join the panels, and after it has cured, completely remove the wire stitches instead of just snipping them off on the outside. With the wires removed, a fillet of thickened epoxy is applied over the entire length of the joint.

True stitch and glue designs generally have few bulkheads, relying instead on the geometry of the panels to provide shape, and forming a monocoque or semi-monocoque structure. But larger stitch and glue boats may have many athwart ship (sideways) or longitudinal (lengthwise) bulkheads in effect egg crating the interior with these members also fused into the final structure with the same type of glass tape and epoxy joints as the major hull seams.

== Spread of the technique ==
Stitch and glue has become one of the dominant techniques in amateur boatbuilding. While the use of relatively few plywood panels (which minimizes the joints and makes the construction easier and faster) limits the shapes possible, the simplicity and low cost of the stitch and glue technique makes it the method of choice among most amateur boatbuilders. Simple software CAD packages are available for designing stitch and glue boats, and there are many Internet bulletin boards, newsgroups, and mailing lists dedicated to the subject of stitch and glue boats and various popular stitch and glue designs. Stitch and glue is not inherently limited to small designs though, as demonstrated by the boats made by Sam Devlin, who has applied the technique to making boats as long as 65 feet.

The "Instant Boats" developed by Phil Bolger use simplified framing and stitch-and-glue style plywood sheet joining and bulkhead gluing. Step-by-step building books about the boats and plans for many were sold by Harold Payson of Thomaston, Maine. They range from very small dinghies to power and sailboats 25 to 30 feet long. They are not necessarily designed for light weight, but like the original Mirror Dinghy, for simple construction. The plans predate CAD panel development software so the shapes are extremely simple in some cases.

=== The one sheet boat ===
The one sheet boat (OSB, cf. oriented strand board) is an outgrowth of the stitch and glue technique. The OSB is a boat that can be built using a single sheet of 4 foot by 8 foot plywood (1.22 m × 2.44 m). Some additional wood is often used, for supports, chines, or as a transom, though some can be built entirely with the sheet of plywood. OSBs tend to be very small, since the displacement is limited to a theoretical maximum of about 1500 lb (680 kg), based on the largest hemispherical shape that could be formed with the same surface area as the sheet of plywood. Though forming a hemisphere is possible (see geodesic dome), it is only practical for one person, since most designs have a maximum displacement of under 1000 lb (450 kg).

== See also ==
- Duramold
