= Dinghy sailing =

Sailing of small boats, usually for sport

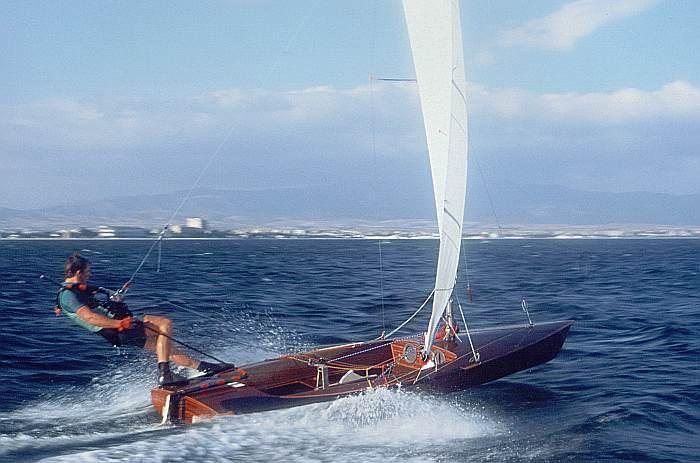
A Contender dinghy on a broad reach

Dinghy sailing is the activity of sailing small boats—usually for recreational purposes, learning necessary sailing skills (often also within family), and competition.

RYA lists five essentials of sailing dinghies as:

- The sails
- The foils (i.e. the daggerboard or centreboard and rudder and sometimes lifting foils as found on the Moth)
- The trim (forward/rear angle of the boat in the water)
- Side-to-side balance of the dinghy by hiking or movement of the crew, particularly in windy weather ("move fast or swim")
- The choice of route (in terms of existing and anticipated wind shifts, possible obstacles, other water traffic, currents, tides etc.)

When racing, the above skills need to be further developed and additional skills and techniques learned, such as the application of the "racing rules of sailing", boat handling skills when starting and when rounding marks, and knowledge of tactics and strategy. Racing tactics include positioning the boat at different angles. To improve speed when racing, sailors should position themselves at the windward direction (closest to the direction of the wind) in order to get "clean air".

The RYA, the regulating authority for sail training in the UK, states that, "With a reliance on nature and the elements, sailing ... is about adventure, exploration, teamwork and fun."

== Development of the dinghy ==
=== Early beginnings ===
There has always been a need for small tender boats for transporting goods and personnel to and from anchored sailing ships. Together with other smaller work craft such as fishing and light cargo, small inshore craft have always been in evidence. Charles II of England had a private sailing boat presented to him when he returned from exile to England in the 17th century, and he sailed for recreation and competition.

In 1887 Thomas Middleton, a Dublin solicitor, considered that yacht racing was becoming an excessively expensive activity, with boats becoming eclipsed by better designs each year. He proposed the 'One Model' principle. He wanted yacht racing to be an exercise of skill with all boats being built to the same design. He assembled a group of potential owners who agreed to call the boat 'The Water Wag'. The Water Wag Club still prospers in Dún Laoghaire harbour, with racing each Wednesday evening during the summer season.

Towards the end of the 19th century people began to use these small boats for sport and recreational sailing, utilising the opportunities for leisure afforded by the Industrial Revolution. Larger privately used sailing boats had developed separately, and have resulted in the yachts of today. There has been some crossover, in that the sloop sail plan was adopted as standard and most convenient by early dinghy designers.

=== Planing and trapezing ===
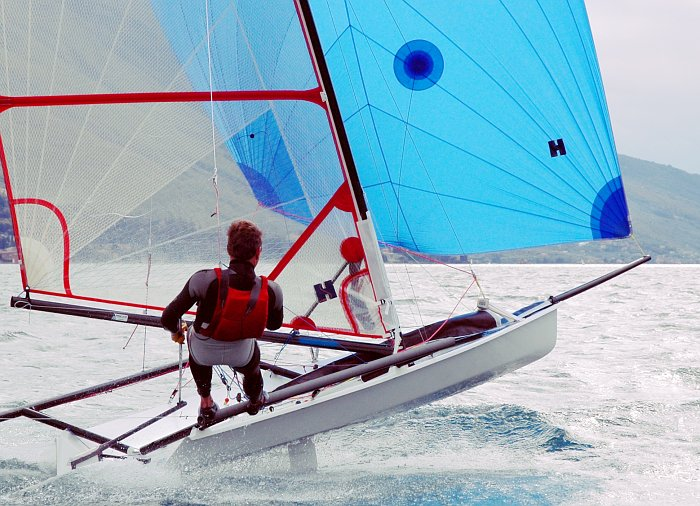
A Musto Performance Skiff dinghy on the reach

The development of the sailing dinghy was helped in the early 20th century by Uffa Fox (1898–1972), an English boat designer and sailing enthusiast. He developed and contributed to many dinghy classes that are still with us nearly a century later: the Albacore, International 14, National 12, Jet 14, Firefly and Flying Fifteen. The Scorpion was designed in 1959 by Taprell Dorling.

He also introduced the major advance of hull shapes that can plane, and which can therefore reach beyond the usual speed limits for small sailing boats. In effect, a boat which is planing is skimming along the surface, with the bow of the boat not in the water. This results in less friction because of reduced waterline length, reduced displacement (the amount of water needing to be pushed aside by the boat), and reduced 'wetted area'. The driving force provided by the sails has to overcome less resistance, and therefore speed increases dramatically.

In 1928 Uffa Fox introduced planing to the English dinghy racing world in his International 14 boat, the Avenger. He achieved 52 first places, two second places and three third places out of 57 race starts that year. Note: Graham Anderson in his 1999 book Fast Light Boats, a Century of Kiwi Innovation argues that planing centreboard sailing boats were introduced into New Zealand in the early 20th century—well before Uffa Fox popularised the concept.

Another advance in dinghy sailing was introduced in the 1930s, when the technique of trapezing was introduced. This involves using the crew to provide more leverage (than possible by hiking out) to keep the sails vertical and the boat balanced; doing this can prevent the boat from capsizing, by hanging outside the boat on a harness and rope attached to the 'hounds' or upper mast. As a result, the boat is easier to keep upright, and the sails can deliver maximum power most of the time. While trapezing can be helpful and increase speed, it can also be very dangerous if the crew is not wearing a quick-release harness or is inexperienced. The quick-release harness allows the crew to unstrap themselves quickly so as to not get forced under the boat if it were to capsize.

Trapezing during a race first appeared in 1934, on the Amazon A Class Rater.

Uffa Fox started building 14s in 1923, and was designing them by 1925. He was to transform the class with the introduction of his first planing hull design, Avenger, in 1927. The construction and finish of his 14s was considered by many to be the ultimate in quality and craftsmanship, and Thunder and Lightning built in 1938 was no exception.

The hull was built of two thin veneers; diagonal internally and fore and aft externally, and stiffened by tiny rock elm frames, all fastened with thousands of copper nails. His aim was to achieve as light a construction as possible using the materials of the day – there was no carbon fibre or Kevlar then.

Within a week of being launched, Thunder & Lightning won one of yachting's premier racing trophies, the Prince of Wales Cup, held that year at Falmouth. It was during this series that the boat's owners, Peter Scott (son of the famous Scott of the Antarctic), and John Winter, used a device now commonly known as the trapeze. At that time, it was known as King George's Jubilee Truss. The device was immediately banned by the Yacht Racing Committee on the grounds that it was unsporting and gave an unfair advantage to its users. Thunder & Lightning is now in the National Maritime Museum Cornwall.

The innovative technique was immediately banned, and received little development until it was reintroduced on the Osprey and Fiveohfive Class (505) in 1954 by John Westell and the Flying Dutchman class in the early 1960s.

=== Post WWII developments ===
During the Second World War plywood had become a major building material for aircraft. After the war, plywood was adapted for building sailing dinghies. Two primary methods of construction were adopted: stitch and glue and timber-framed construction. Jack Holt designed many dinghies to be built by home handymen using these construction techniques. The Mirror Dinghy was predominantly built using stitch and glue, while the Enterprise and Heron is an example of a boat built using plywood on a timber frame.

=== Modern developments ===
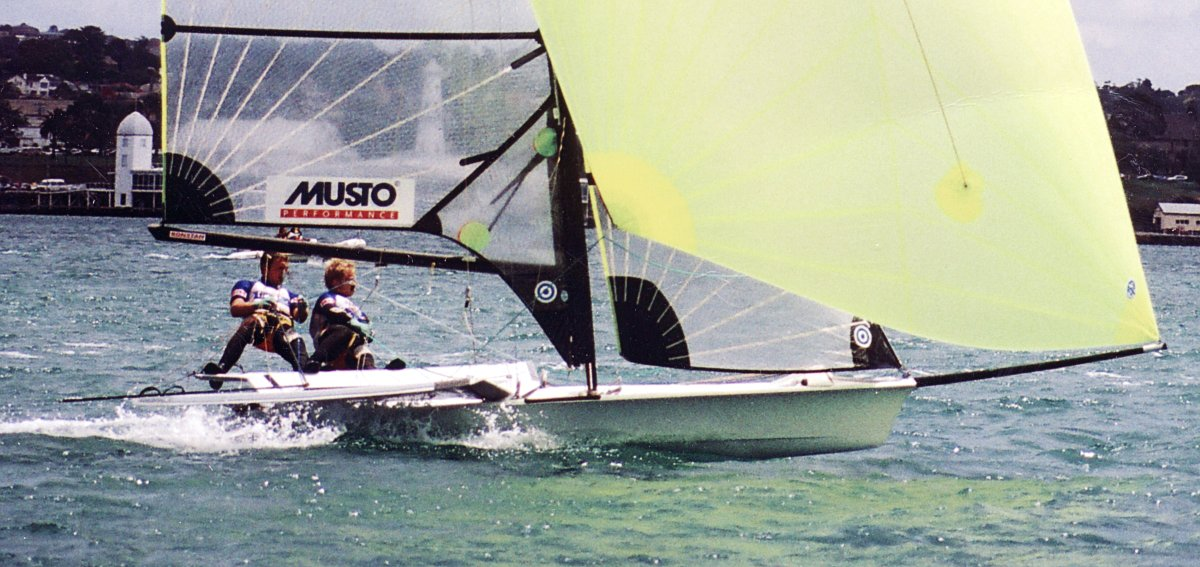
A 49er skiff in a race

At the beginning of the 21st century, dinghy sailing is still a rapidly developing sport. It is losing its image of being expensive, time-consuming, and exclusive. This is because of the earlier work of pioneers such as Uffa Fox, and through the use of modern designs and techniques such as lighter hull materials (e.g., fibreglass and foam sandwich hull construction, which eliminate time-consuming maintenance and constant care that wooden hulls required, although they are rare and only a few people make them some still sail with wooden boats), more responsive sail materials and design, easily transportable boats (many car-toppable), and simpler rigs such as gennakers instead of more complex spinnakers. These advances are more economical in time and money, and have greatly extended the appeal of dinghy sailing.

In Britain, the RYA regulates racing and provides modular and accredited training courses for leisure and competitive sailing. A basic sailing course can be completed in several days. Similar organisations exist worldwide to administer and promote both leisure and competitive sailing.

== Dinghy racing ==
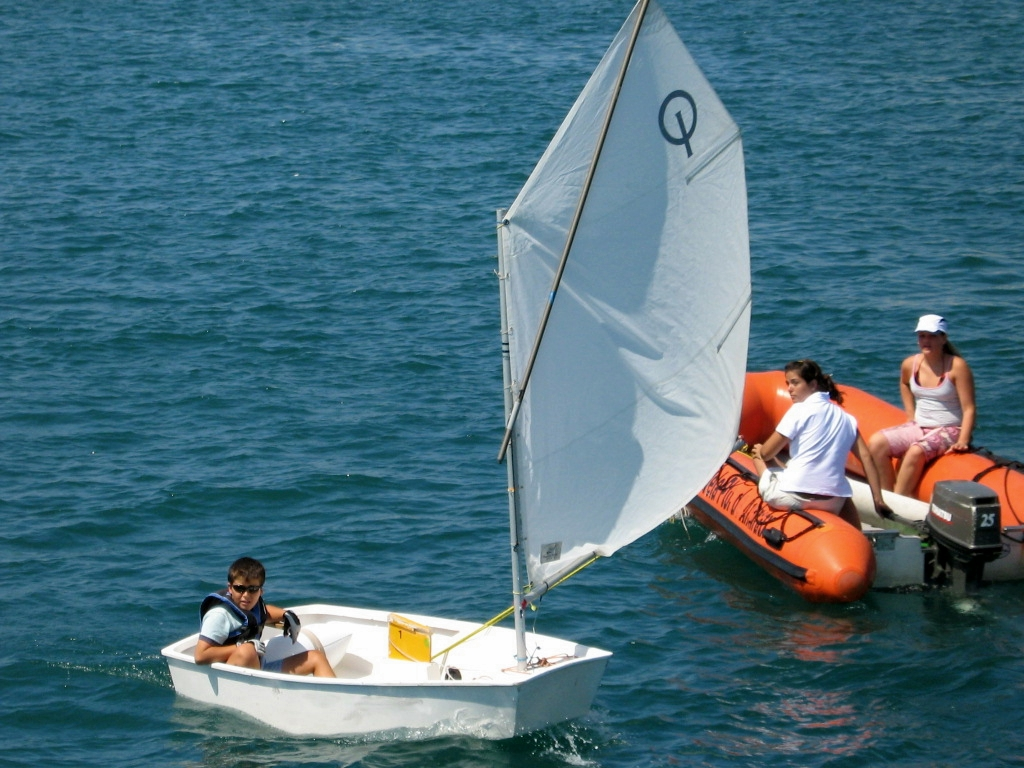
Optimist dinghy, often used for youth racing

Racing is one of the most popular forms of dinghy sailing, and it contributes to the development of sailing skills as well as to improvements in dinghy and sail construction and design. Sometimes the Olympic triangle is used as a course for dinghy races where space permits, particularly for events where there ought to be little local advantage such as State and National titles and for classes which are mainly displacement sailing such as the Heron (dinghy). The olympic triangle is the most popular choice for dinghy racing, but a windward leeward course is another popular option.

== See also ==
- Dinghy
- Dinghy racing
