= Fairey Marine =

British boat building company

Fairey Marine Ltd, latterly known as FBM Marine, was a boat building company based on the River Hamble, Southampton, England. The company was created in the late 1940s by Sir Charles Richard Fairey and Fairey Aviation's managing director, Mr. Chichester-Smith. Both were avid sailing enthusiasts along with Chichester-Smith's good friend and former Olympic yachtsman, Charles Currey.

== C.R. Fairey ==
Fairey was also a keen J-class yacht enthusiast. Fairey came to own Shamrock V built in 1930 for Sir Thomas Lipton's fifth and last America's Cup challenge. Designed by Charles Nicholson, she was the first British yacht to be built to the new J Class rule and is the only remaining J built in wood. Sir T.O.M. Sopwith had considerable knowledge of yacht racing and purchased Shamrock V in 1932 to gain experience in J Class racing. He challenged in 1933 and using his experience from Shamrock V went on to build "Endeavour". Shamrock V was then sold to Sir Richard Fairey. In the pre war years, Fairey had commissioned yacht designer Charles Nicholson to build him a 12 Metre class racing yacht. To support this endeavour Sir Richard utilised the designers and engineers at the Fairey Aviation company's design office to undertake research, design and development work. Hydrodynamic research was augmented by construction of the world's first experimental low speed wind tunnel for racing yacht design at the Hayes factory. Although the primary use of the wind tunnel was for sails research, Fairey engineers also developed a method of experiment for measuring the component known as skin friction in naval architecture which was used in both the hull and sails research work. The resulting craft was known as Flica, in this craft Fairey won 35 flags in 39 races in 1932 and in the following year 49 flags in 55 races.

== Post war work ==
As the war drew to a close Fairey and Chichester-Smith both decided that they should produce sailing dinghies utilising techniques that had been employed in the construction of aircraft. Charles Currey was recruited to help run the company when he came out of the Royal Navy. The world air speed record holder Peter Twiss joined Fairey Marine Ltd from Fairey Aviation in 1960 and was responsible for development and sales of day-cruisers. In 1969, commanding the Huntsman 707 Fordsport, he took part in the Round Britain Powerboat Race, and included among his crew members, Rally champion Roger Clark. Boats were primarily designed by Alan Burnard.

In the early years, thousands of dinghies were produced by Fairey Marine including the Firefly, Albacore, Falcon (dinghy), Swordfish (dinghy), Jollyboat, Flying Fifteen, 505 and International 14's along with the much smaller Dinky and Duckling. Later on in the 1950s they produced the larger sailing cruisers, the Atalanta (named after Sir Richard's wife), Titania, Fulmar and the 27-foot (8.2 m) Fisherman motor sailer (based on the Fairey Lifeboat hull) along with the 15' Cinderella (outboard runabout)/ Carefree (inboard runabout), and the 16'6" Faun (outboard powered family cruiser).

In the 1960s Fairey designed and built a range of wooden-hulled speedboats and motor launches designed by Alan Burnand.
These became well known in boating circles for their speed, stability and good rough-water handling. Craft were sold to both wealthy and famous individuals, including Deborah Kerr, Prince Albert of Belgium and Billy Butlin. The craft also starred in the James Bond film From Russia with Love. Sean Connery as James Bond can be seen driving a white Fairey Huntress and the being chased by a Fairey Huntsman 28s and several blue Fairey Huntresses. The Huntsman was commanded by Charles Currey.

Types such as the Dagger and Spearfish were used as police launches and as pinnaces by the Royal Navy. In the early 1970s Fairey switched to glass reinforced plastic hulls of the same design. The range was expanded to include cabin cruiser types (such as the Swordfish) which could still put in an impressive turn of speed and won several cruiser-class long distances races, such as the London-Monte Carlo race.

Fairey also manufactured 2 × 53-foot motor cruisers in the early 70s which were named the Amira. Designed by Alan Burnard, they were designed with cold moulded ply construction hull and ply superstructure. The Fairey Amira was designed to take two engines with up to 1000 bhp each, one of the boats was fitted with 2 Isotta Fraschini 700 hp v8 engines with ZF vee drive gearboxes and the other was fitted with 2 MTU 8v331 tc80 engines each developing 800 hp with ZF vee drive gearboxes. The design speed for this boat was up to 40 knots; the boat was offered with a wide range of engines including gas turbines. Only one of the pair still remains, this is hull No1 "Fataam", her home port is Puerto Duquesa in southern Spain.

Today, Swordsman Marine builds motorboats based on Fairey designs. These include 30-foot (9.1 m) speedboats based on the Spearfish, using the same hull with a modified cabin and modern engine and controls, and larger cabin cruisers based on a modified version of the Dagger design. Fairey Marine absorbed the East Cowes firm of Groves and Gutteridge Ltd., established since 1899. One of the main products of the company has been lifeboats for the Royal National Lifeboat Institution.

== Collapse of Fairey Marine ==
Fairey Marine was taken into Receivership along with other companies in the Fairey Group in 1975 when the parent company went into liquidation. The business was subsequently absorbed into what is now the marine division of Babcock International Group. When the main Fairey company went into receivership the work force and the management did not want to be taken over by Trafalgar House or Rank International because they expected that those companies would shut the firm and adapt the site for use as a marina. The workforce wanted to stay in boat building and were keen that the National Enterprise Board should take them over. Since then the company developed and expanded its range of products as well as acquiring a number of other companies including Cheverton Workboats, Brooke Marine and what became Fairey Marinteknik, the company was also known as Fairey Allday, all companies absorbed into Fairey produced the Waveney-class lifeboat for the RNLI; see also Attacker-class patrol boat, produced in the early 1980s before emerging as FBM Marine in 1988. In March 2000, FBM Marine was acquired by Babcock International Group PLC, a major UK based support services, facilities management and engineering company specialising in the support of defence forces worldwide, and renamed FBM Babcock Marine Ltd.

== Construction methods ==
The hot moulding process was an adaptation to post war boat building of the method originally developed by de Havillands in the 1930s for "stressed skin" wooden aircraft production, using layers of thin birch plywood sandwiched together with glue over a male mould and "cooked" in a large oven called an "autoclave" By using true mass-production techniques, Fairey Marine were able to turn out vast numbers of identical boats at an unprecedented quality and price. Moulds were constructed from spruce, built up on a steel base plate. Seven by three inches planks cut to the waterplane sections provided the starting point. Working from the sheerline, the planks were built up in a series of steps, arriving quickly at a close representation of the designed shape. Subsequent fairing yielded finished dimensions. Rebates for the keel, stem and transom completed the mould building process. Although the veneers used to produce Fairey boats may appear to be parallel sided, every one was in fact profiled. Rather than shaping each veneer to fit on the mould, as in traditional boat building, Faireys saved an enormous amount of time by sawing complete sets of veneers to precision patterns. Veneers were produced in stacks of six. Boat were then typically built in batches of 24 or 36. Early boats used 1/8″ spruce ply, surplus to the War Department's de Havilland Mosquito aircraft programme. When this material became unavailable it was replaced by 2.5 mm agba veneers.

Chosen for its high gum content, agba formed easily without splitting and glued well. All the dinghy classes used just three agba veneers while some of the bigger boats used up to six. Initially all the veneers were laid at 45° while later boats changed to fore and aft outer planking for aesthetic reasons. With the keel, stem and transom in place, veneers were applied starting on the centreline and working out towards the shear. Each veneer was held in place by just three staples at the keel, bilge and shearline. Roller-application of Borden One-Shot waterproof glue preceded each veneer except the first. With all veneers in place a vacuum bag was drawn over the moulding and secured in place using a clamp plate and G-clamps. Early vacuum bags were made from war surplus barrage balloon fabric. After about 1950, individual rubber bags were prepared on the moulds using uncured rubber sheets which were subsequently vulcanised in the autoclaves used for production.

Placed in the autoclave, the vacuum was drawn down to 27/28 inches water-gauge and steam at a pressure of some 50 pounds per square inch introduced. Processing took about 45 minutes at 100 °C. Curing at elevated temperatures under vacuum not only ensured that all the veneers were firmly consolidated – a process requiring many thousands of staples using the conventional cold-moulding process – but allowed for the use of a truly waterproof, single part, high-temperature curing glue. During the curing process the glue impregnated the wood resulting in a virtually rot-proof finished shell. Components such as side-decks were also hot moulded while other parts required for assembly were cut to patterns in the same way as the skin veneers. For one of the more complex boats, the International 14, the time for final construction from bare hull to finished boat was set at 230-man-hours compared to 400–500 hours associated with traditional construction.

== Power boats ==
When Richard Fairey son of Sir Richard started the powerboat business, he had contacted US designer C Raymond Hunt (designer of the International 110) about using the designs that were proving so successful in races such as the Miami-Nassau. Fairey Marine motor cruisers began with boats being built to Hunt designs. The exclusive concessionary rights for the sale of Fairey craft were acquired by businessman Bruce Campbell. He went off to the South of France with the first four hot-moulded Fairey boats on a sales trip, naming the design Christina. The 23 ft (7m) design may have suited Hunt's local waters but being fully open boats and incorporating leaky retractable centre-boards, they were not well received. Before long Campbell returned with all four boats still in tow. Richard Fairey then employed British designer Alan Burnard to adapt Hunt's ideas and come up with more suitable designs, while Bruce Campbell severed his close ties with the company.

Burnard's first designs, included the Huntress and were far more appropriate, Fairey went on to build hundreds of boats to Burnard designs. In addition to producing its own craft, Fairey also supplied bare hulls suitable for fitting out, and Campbell, still looking to fulfil his own ideas for a luxury powerboat, acquired Huntress hulls, with the blessing of Fairey, fitting them out to his own specifications and calling them, once again, Christinas; the later models were laid up in GRP by Halmatic. Campbell's boats proved successful in British racing both in Round Britain races and the Cowes-Torquay. Tommy Sopwith won the inaugural 1961 Cowes Torquay race in a Christina 25.

The most common Fairey Marine Motor Cruisers are listed below:

- Fairey Huntress
- Fairey Huntsman / Fairey Huntsman 28 / Fairey Huntsman 31: The design of the Huntsman and its smaller sister, the Huntress were the inspiration of Ray Hunt and designed by Alan Burnard. These boats enjoyed considerable success in 1960s power boat racing, and came to represent the classic type of the period. The planing hull design has been copied in various guises since. The hull is a relatively deep V with single chine and spray rails. The construction was of laminated mahogany, Once laminated the hulls were cooked in an autoclave to cure the glue. The engines (Twin Perkins T6354 145 hp 5.95 litre turbo diesel) were placed midships under a sloping deck to the cock-pit.
- Fairey Fantome
- Fairey Swordsman: 61 Swordsman boats were built between 1964 and 1974 at the Hamble Point factory around 40 are still in service today. Initially 33' long and with a beam of 11' 5", they came in either an aft cabin or open cockpit version. Like the Huntress and Huntsman 28 they were also available in kit form or as a hull only if required – they were the largest of the production boats built by Fairey Marine. In the middle of the production Faireys introduced an upgraded version called the Super Swordsman.
- Fairey Spearfish and Spear

Other craft produced by Fairey Marine were a total of 88 hulls for Dell Quay Productions Ltd which were used to produce the Dell Quay Ranger and Christinas. The company was perhaps most renowned for producing exclusive powerboats and cruisers based on an extensive racing pedigree. Fairey Marine cruisers won 148 racing awards between the years 1961 and 1973, including the prestigious Monte-Carlo and Cowes-Torquay races. 1969 was a particularly successful year, with a tally of 54 awards.

== Sailing craft ==
Fairey Marine's first volume production boat was the Firefly, a 12 ft sailing dinghy which continues to be a popular racing dinghy today. In 1946 Uffa Fox was asked by Chichester-Smith, together with Stewart Morris, to design a one-design twelve foot dinghy. Uffa Fox dusted off his pre war Sea Swallow design renaming it Firefly to name it after Fairey aircraft. Another dinghy, the 15 ft Albacore, was also built by other manufacturers and raced at many sailing clubs in the UK and other countries. The Firefly was one of the first production dinghies ever built in large numbers, the initial cost of a boat was £65. The first four were bought by Sir Geoffrey Lowles, commodore of Itchenor Sailing Club, which he named Fe, Fi, Fo and Fum. The boat was also considered to be sufficiently competitive enough to be selected for the single handed class in the 1948 Olympics, although it was replaced in 1952 by the Finn. Early boats were built from laminates of birch ply, left over from the stocks used to build Horsa gliders. The mast, built by Reynolds, was aluminium alloy with the top section made from spruce. A number of modifications have been made to the class over the years including construction in GRP from 1968, and the introduction of a one-piece rotating mast by Proctors in 1970. Despite the introduction of plastics to replace ply moulded boats, it is a testament to their build quality that there are still many wooden boats racing regularly.

Production Sailing Dinghies

- 505,
- Albacore,
- Dinky,
- Duckling,
- Falcon,
- Firefly,
- Flying Dutchman,
- International Finn,
- Gannet,
- International 14- Mk1 to Mk5 Designed by Uffa Fox,
- Jollyboat_(Uffa Fox),
- Swordfish,
- Shearwater III

Production Yachts

Later on in the 1950s they produced the larger sailing cruisers, the Atalanta (named after Sir Richard's wife), Fulmar and the 27' Fisherman motor sailer (based on the Fairey Lifeboat hull) along with the 15 Cinderella (outboard runabout) and the 16'6" Faun (outboard powered family cruiser).

Between 1956 and 1968 Fairey Marine produced some 291 Atalanta class sailing yachts, designed by Uffa Fox: The Atalanta was conceived in 1955 by Alan Vines, a senior executive at Fairey, with the expertise of Uffa Fox who was their Design Consultant. It was envisaged as a trailable shallow draft performance cruiser with the sea keeping capabilities and safety of a fin keel yacht. Over the succeeding decades the distinctive centre cockpit design with its rolled decks and generous accommodation has more than fulfilled expectations, offering a respectable turn of speed in light airs while her retractable cast iron keels give outstanding heavy weather performance in a seaway. Robust enough to carry its full sail in winds up to force five, the Atalanta retains many of the handling characteristics of a classic dinghy.

Fairey Marine went on to produce three variants of the Atalanta, another 26 ft (8.1m) hull with a slightly shorter cockpit and more headroom called the Titania (named after another Fairey flying boat), a larger version the Atalanta 31 (9.45m) and the Fulmar a 20 ft(6.1m) version with a single lifting keel.

Fairey Marine Production Yacht Classes

- Atalanta 26
- Atalanta 31
- Titania (also 26 ft but with greater cabin headroom)
- Fulmar

Also produced using the same technique of hot-moulded veneers were the Dinky and Duckling dinghies, mainly used as tenders although the Duckling was also sold as a sailing dinghy, also the Pixie a two-part symmetrical dinghy/canoe.

It is mentioned in the Fairey Review that between 1946 and 1963 the Hamble factory produced over 11,000 boats.

== Other work ==
During the 1950s Fairey Marine decided to build a production folding boat, a cross between a canoe, a dinghy and a punt. Of plywood and waterproofed canvas construction, the boat was robust, with individual sections being bolted together and stiffened with removable bulkheads. Fore and aft shaped sections were added for better performance through the water. Additional sections were available so the boat could seat from one to four persons. There was even a rigid deck spray cover so it could be used for surf canoeing.

In 1974, Fairey Marine was awarded the contract to build a new floating bridge between East and West Cowes, on the Isle of Wight. The bridge (or ferry) travels along two heavy chains anchored on either side of the River Medina. The chains pass through slots beneath the cardeck of the ferry, and the winch machinery inside pulls along the chain, taking it from one shore to the other. The chains are kept loose so that they sink to the river bed, allowing other vessels to use the river and sail above the chains. The use of chains means that it is impossible for the ferry to go off course or become lost in fog. The bridge is diesel powered, took 16 months to build and cost £280,000. It carries up to 19 cars, Since 1982, the bridge has been the only floating bridge on the route and since 1992 foot passengers have travelled free of charge.

Combat Support Boat
One of the last designs to come from Fairey Marine before being absorbed into FBM Babcock Marine Limited was a craft based on a requirement issued by the UK Military Vehicles and Engineering Establishment at Christchurch, the Fairey company started development of the 8m Combat Support Boat (CSB) in the autumn of 1975, with the first prototype being delivered to the British Army for trials early in 1977. As a result of extensive trials the boat was accepted for service with the British Army in February 1979 and an order placed for 56 boats. The Ministry of Defence ordered a further 12 CSBs to replace those lost during the Falklands War. After evaluation by the US Army, with over 700 boats delivered, more than half of these having been license-produced in the US.

== Associated companies ==
1. Fairey Marine Holdings Ltd, Hamble, Management company;
2. Fairey Marine (East Cowes) Ltd, East Cowes, Ship and boat building;
3. Fairey Exhibitions Ltd, Hamble, Exhibition stand contractors;
4. Fairey Marine Ltd, Hamble, Boat building and repair;
5. Fairey Yacht Harbours Ltd, Hamble, Boat handling, berthing and storage;

== Fairey-sponsored sailing competitions ==
The Schools Championships was started in 1953 under the name of The Public Schools Firefly Invitation Championships. Its aim was to promote inter-schools sailing competition and the encouragement of young sailors. The winning school won a prize of a Fairey Firefly 12 ft dinghy. This scheme was the idea of Colin Chichester-Smith and Charles Currey both of Fairey Marine. They both sailed International 14 footers at that time and asked the Itchenor Sailing Club to run the event which has become a prestigious UK competition. Fairey Marine presented a complete Firefly for some 19 years. To reduce their financial commitment in later years Ratsey & Lapthorn, the sail makers, presented the sails. The Firefly first prize was replaced in 1972 by today's engraved plate "The Sir Richard Fairey Challenge Trophy".

== Preservation groups and associations ==
The Fairey Enthusiasts Club is for those who share an appreciation of the boats built by Fairey Marine exclusively. Its main objective is to offer a freely available exchange for information and comments for those with an interest in Fairey Marine or for those restoring a Fairey boat from the 1960s to the early 1980s.

Fairey Owners' Club Although Fairey boats were built from the '50s to the early '80s, it was not until 1986 that the Fairey Owners Club was founded by Justin Birt. Their basic idea, which still remains the principal objective of the club, is to preserve the marque of Fairey boats especially powerboats. Latterly the club has admitted owners of modern interpretations and copies of the original boats. These boats use identical hull moulds or have been designed by Fairey's chief designer, Alan Burnard.

Atalanta Owners Association: The Atalanta Owners Association (AOA) was started in 1958 by Fairey Marine with the object of maintaining a register of the Atalanta class sailing craft. With the demise of the company, many of the records and drawings of these craft were passed to the AOA and are still available to members.

== See also ==
- Fairey Aviation
- Fairey N.4
- Uffa Fox
