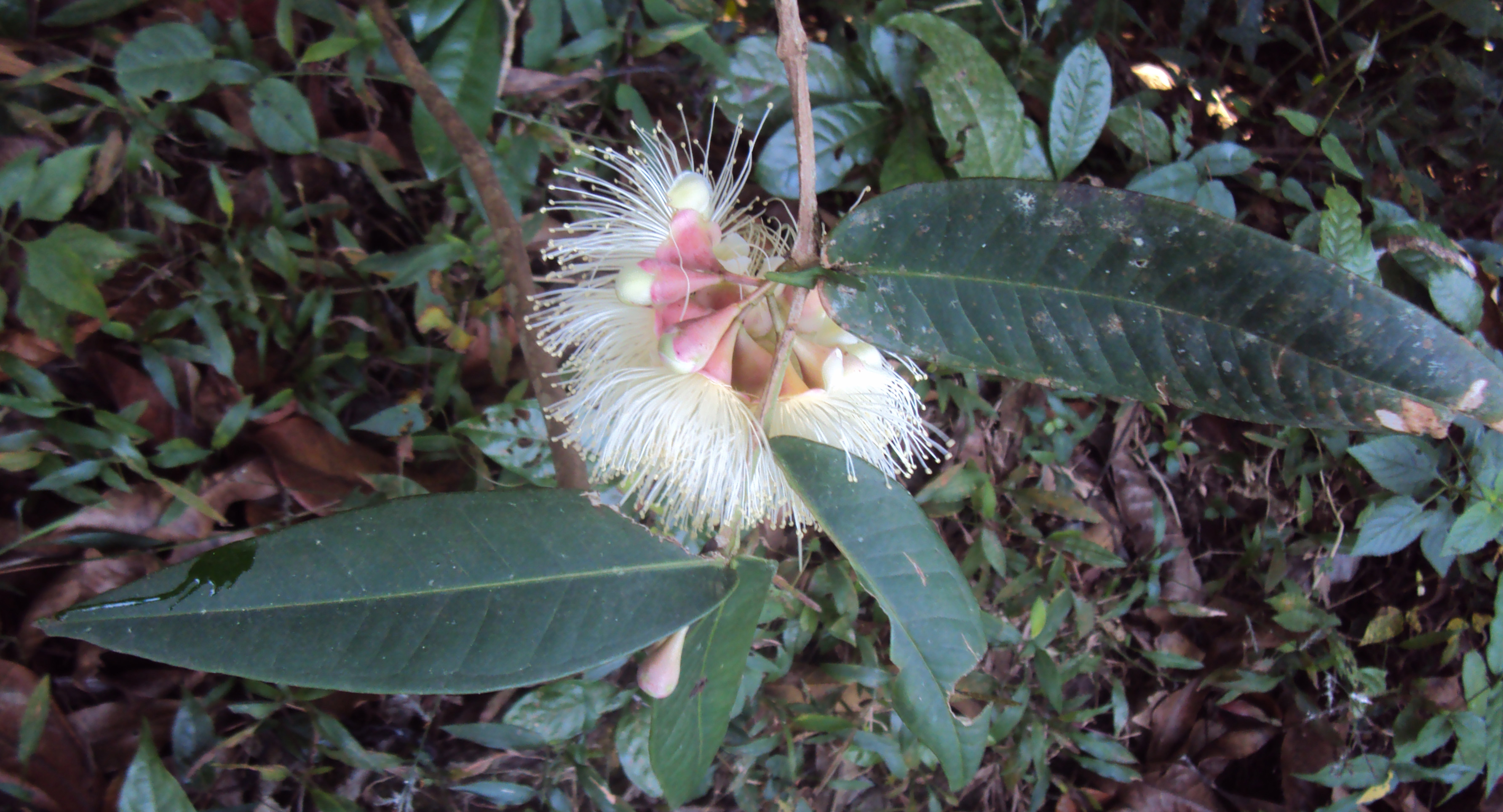

Conservation status
- Near Threatened (IUCN 3.1)

Scientific classification
- Kingdom: Plantae
- Clade: Tracheophytes
- Clade: Angiosperms
- Clade: Eudicots
- Clade: Rosids
- Order: Myrtales
- Family: Myrtaceae
- Genus: Syzygium
- Species: S. munroi

Binomial name
- Syzygium munroi (Wight) Chandrab.

Synonyms
- Eugenia munroi Wight; Eugenia munroii Miq., orth. var.; Jambosa munroi (Wight) Walp.

= Syzygium munroi =

Species of flowering plant

Syzygium munroi is a species of flowering plant in the family Myrtaceae. It is a small evergreen tree native to southwestern and northeastern India. In southwestern India it is known from the southern Western Ghats of Karnataka, Kerala, and Tamil Nadu states. It grows in lowland and lower montane tropical rainforests from sea level to 1,200 metres elevation, where it is associated with Vateria indica, Prioria pinnata, Dipterocarpus indicus, Palaquium ellipticum, Cullenia exarillata, and Mesua ferrea. It is also known from the Khasi Hills of Assam state in northeastern India.

The species was first described as Eugenia munroi by Robert Wight in 1841. In 1977 Marimuthu Chandrabose placed the species in genus Syzygium as S. munroi.
