= John Westell =

English sailboat designer

Personal information
- Nationality: English
- Born: Woodroffe John Westell; 11 March 1921 Devon
- Died: January 1989 (age 68) Devon

Sailing career
- Sport: Sailing
- Class: International 14

John Westell (11 March 1921 – January 1989) was an English sailboat designer, who is noted for designing the 505 sailing dinghy and the Ocean Bird class of trimarans. Westell also designed cruising sailboats.

== Biography ==
Born Woodroffe John Westell on 11 March 1921 in Devon, England, Westell dropped the use of "Woodroffe" in his name, which was a reference to his ancestry. By age 16, he was a champion dinghy racer. In 1939, he volunteered for the Royal Navy Reserve and helped deliver a Bird-class minesweeper to the New Zealand Navy. He returned to become a sub-lieutenant and train as a meteorologist. During World War II, he was posted to a naval air station in Ceylon (which became Sri Lanka in 1972). After the war, he returned to England, married and became a father by 1950. He raced International 14 sailboats and co-founded the magazine, Yachts and Yachting.

He died of cancer in January 1989 at the age of 68, having retired from a position at Honnor Marine, a manufacturer of sailing craft.

== Sailboat design ==
Westell's first boat design was a plywood, 16-foot (4.9 m), scow-shaped dinghy. In the early 1950s he became interested in experimenting with the characteristics of the International 14 and the Flying Dutchman hull shapes to improve their planing characteristics. This led to the development of the 505 sailing dinghy.

He first worked for a sailboat manufacturer in Rochester, Kent and later became a technical director of production at Honnor Marine at Totnes, Devon. In the 1970s, he became interested in cruising trimarans with his Ocean Bird swinging-ama design.

=== 505 sailing dinghy ===
Westell designed the 18-foot dinghy, Coronet, in 1953. This sailboat competed in the International Yacht Racing Union (IYRU) selection trials at La Baule, France, in 1953 for a new two-person performance dinghy for the Olympics. Although the Coronet lost Olympic selection to the Flying Dutchman (even though its performance was notably superior), in 1954 the Caneton Association of France asked Westell to modify his Coronet design to create for them a 5-meter performance dinghy that would be suitable to their needs. Westell settled on a measured length 5.05 m to allow for boat-building tolerances of the day, and the resulting craft become known as the 505. The class achieved international status with the IYRU in 1955.

=== Ocean Bird trimaran class ===
Westell designed the prototype Ocean Bird, which became a trimaran sailboat in the 1970s. It featured fold-in lateral floats on a webless steel-beam frame chosen to provide stability against heeling, yet allow a compact footprint in harbour.
