= Charles Currey =

British sailor (1916–2010)

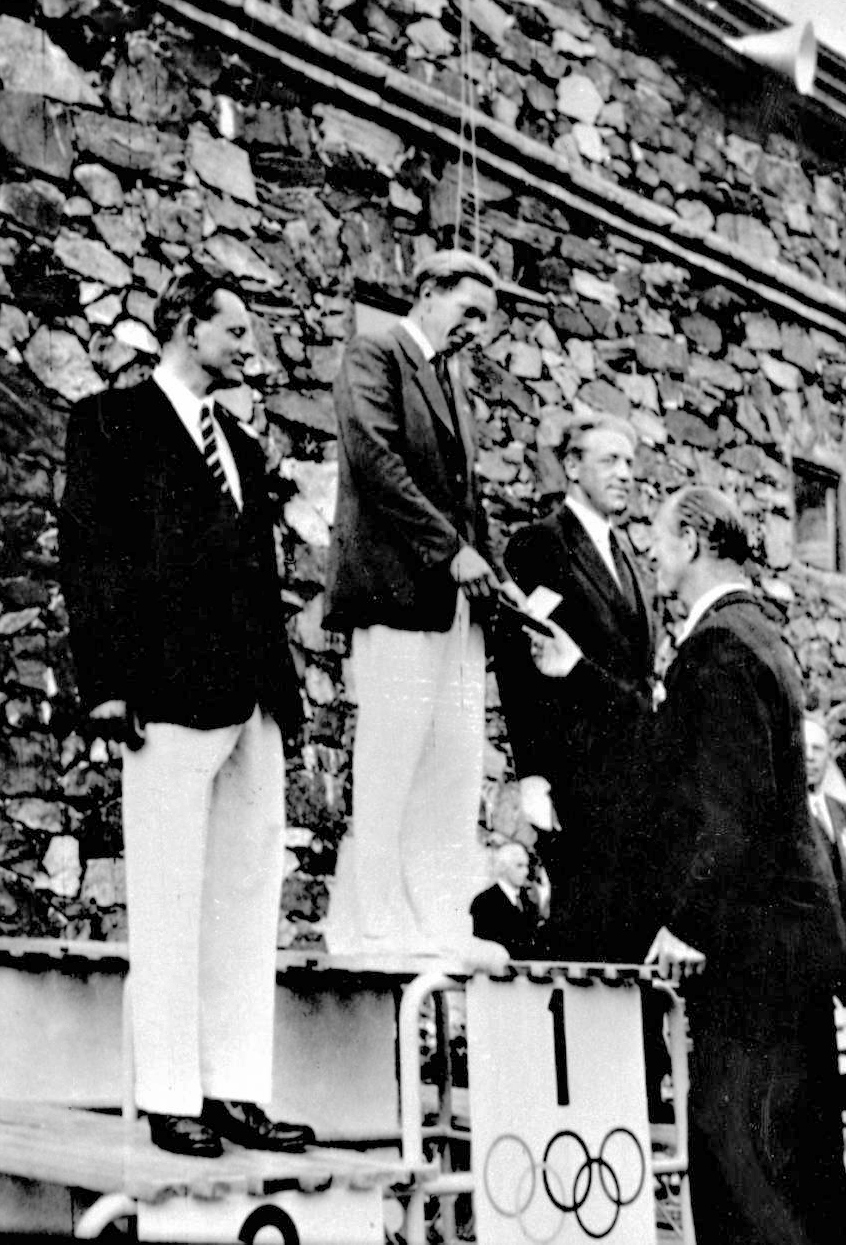
- Currey (left) at the 1952 Olympics

Personal information
- Born: 26 February 1916
- Died: 10 May 2010 (aged 94)

Sailing career
- Sport: Sailing
Medal record
Sailing
Representing United Kingdom
Olympic Games
Silver medal – second place	1952 Helsinki	Finn class

Charles Norman Currey (26 February 1916 – 10 May 2010) was a British sailor who won a silver medal in Finn class at the 1952 Olympics.

Currey was born into a marine family. He had to abandon an anticipated career in the British Navy due to an illness, and instead became a renowned sailor and boat builder. At the onset of World War II he was accepted as a member of Royal Naval Reserve, and was eventually promoted to lieutenant commander and appointed as captain of a gunboat patrolling the English Channel. He then returned to boat building and became an expert in the Finn dinghy. He was considered for the 1948 Olympic team in this boat class, and was selected in 1952, when he won a silver medal ahead the Swedish boat designer Rickard Sarby. After that Currey designed and sailed other types of dinghies, as well as powerboats. In the 1960 he was appointed as managing director of the Fairey Marine company, where he worked for the past decades. His son Alistair Currey also became an Olympic sailor.
