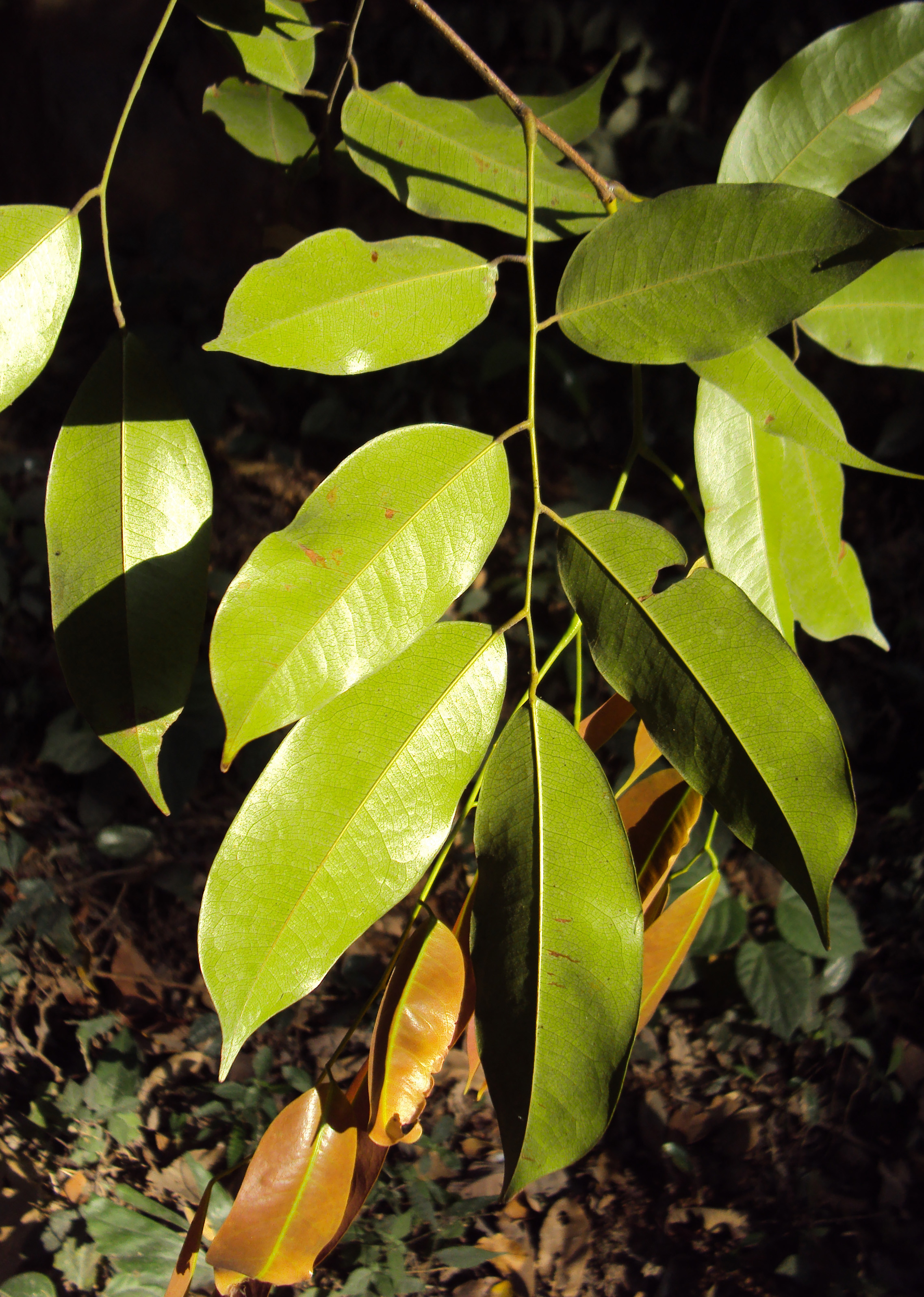

Conservation status
- Vulnerable (IUCN 3.1)

Scientific classification
- Kingdom: Plantae
- Clade: Tracheophytes
- Clade: Angiosperms
- Clade: Eudicots
- Clade: Rosids
- Order: Fabales
- Family: Fabaceae
- Genus: Prioria
- Species: P. pinnata

Binomial name
- Prioria pinnata (Roxb. ex DC.) Breteler

Synonyms
- Hardwickia pinnata Roxb. ex DC.; Kingiodendron pinnatum (Roxb. ex DC.) Harms

= Prioria pinnata =

Species of legume

Prioria pinnata, known as kulavu or ennappayin in Malayalam, is a species of legume in the family Fabaceae. It is a tree endemic to the Western Ghats of southwestern India. It is a large tree up to 35 metres tall, which grows as a canopy tree in lowland and mid-elevation rain forests in the states of Karnataka, Kerala, Tamil Nadu from 130 to 950 metres elevation. It is associated with Hopea ponga, Hopea parviflora, Dipterocarpus indicus, Vateria indica, Tetrameles nudiflora, and Diospyros crumenata.

Trees were traditionally tapped by local people for lamp oil, but harvesting has now ceased as alternatives became available.

The species is threatened by habitat loss. The population has declined considerably because of overexploitation and habitat degradation. Populations at low elevations are extremely fragmented, and less fragmented at higher elevations. The IUCN Red List assesses the species as Vulnerable.
