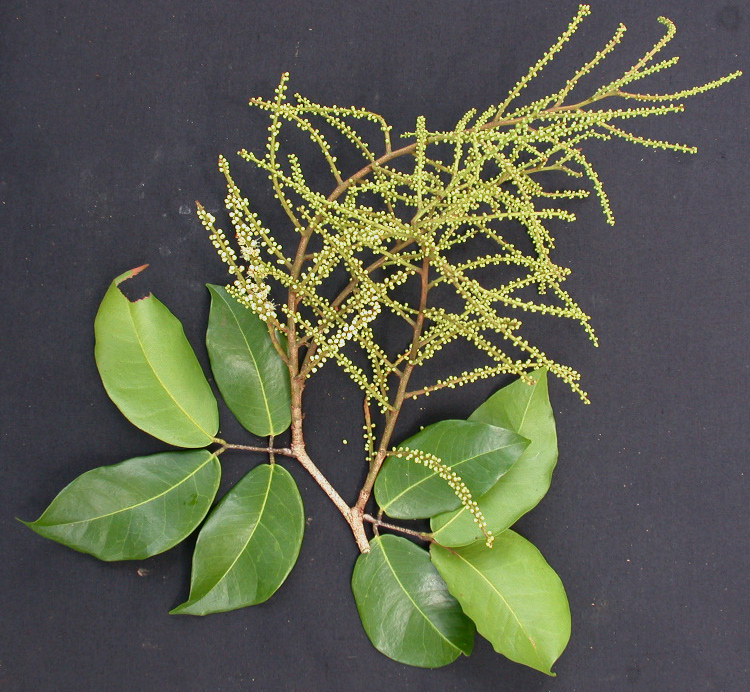
- Prioria copaifera leaves & inflorescence

Scientific classification
- Kingdom: Plantae
- Clade: Tracheophytes
- Clade: Angiosperms
- Clade: Eudicots
- Clade: Rosids
- Order: Fabales
- Family: Fabaceae
- Subfamily: Detarioideae
- Tribe: Detarieae
- Genus: Prioria; Griseb.

Type species
- Prioria copaifera Griseb.

Synonyms
- Eriander Winkler; Gossweilerodendron Harms; Kingiodendron Harms; Oxystigma Harms; Pterygopodium Harms

= Prioria =

Genus of legumes

Prioria is a genus of flowering plants in the family Fabaceae. Members of this genus are found in Central America, Africa, southern Asia, and Oceania.

== Species ==
Prioria comprises the following species

=== African species ===
- Prioria balsamifera (Vermoesen) Breteler
- Prioria buchholzii (Harms) Breteler
- Prioria gilbertii (J. Léonard) Breteler
- Prioria joveri (Normand ex Aubrév.) Breteler
- Prioria mannii (Baill.) Breteler
- Prioria msoo (Harms) Breteler
- Prioria oxyphylla (Harms) Breteler

=== American species ===
- Prioria copaifera Griseb.
- † Prioria martineziorum Rodriguez-Reyes & Estrada-Ruiz

=== Asiatic and Pacific species ===
- Prioria alternifolia (Elm.) Breteler
- Prioria micrantha (Burtt) Breteler
- Prioria novoguineensis (Verde.) Breteler
- Prioria pinnata (Roxb. ex DC.) Breteler
- Prioria platycarpa (Burtt) Breteler
- Prioria tenuicarpa (Verde.) Breteler
