= Prioria platycarpa =

Conservation status
- Least Concern (IUCN 2.3)

Scientific classification
- Kingdom: Plantae
- Clade: Tracheophytes
- Clade: Angiosperms
- Clade: Eudicots
- Clade: Rosids
- Order: Fabales
- Family: Fabaceae
- Genus: Prioria
- Species: P. platycarpa

Binomial name
- Prioria platycarpa (Burtt) Breteler

Synonyms
- Kingiodendron platycarpum Burtt

Species of legume

Prioria platycarpa is a species of plant in the family Fabaceae. It is found only in Fiji.
