= Prioria msoo =

Conservation status
- Vulnerable (IUCN 2.3)

Scientific classification
- Kingdom: Plantae
- Clade: Tracheophytes
- Clade: Angiosperms
- Clade: Eudicots
- Clade: Rosids
- Order: Fabales
- Family: Fabaceae
- Genus: Prioria
- Species: P. msoo

Binomial name
- Prioria msoo (Harms) Breteler

Synonyms
- Oxystigma msoo Harms

Species of legume

Prioria msoo is a species of plant in the family Fabaceae. It is found in Kenya and Tanzania.
