= National 12 =

Sailing dinghy class

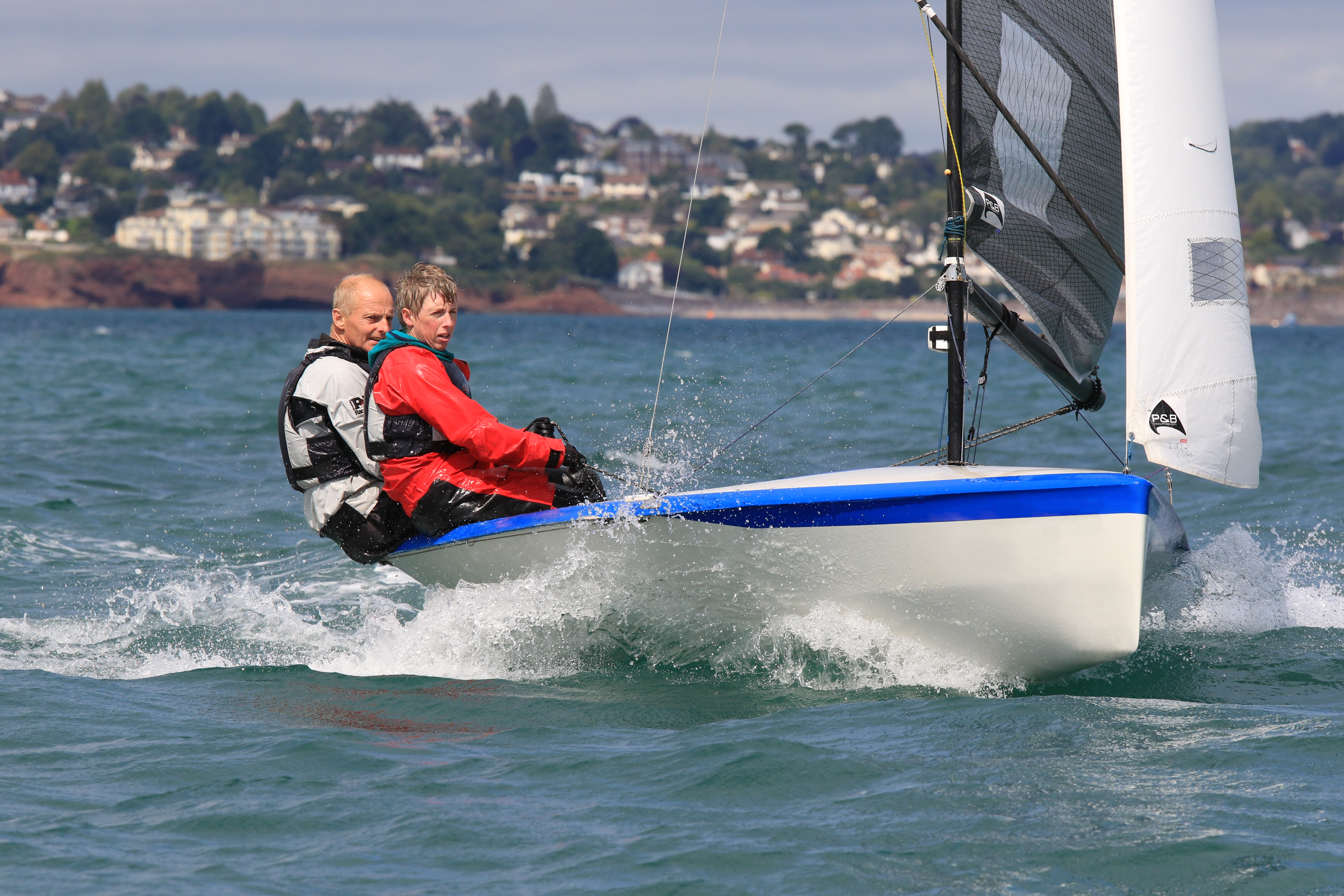
DCBs are one of the leading designs, sporting a carbon rig and winged rudder.

The National 12 is a two-person, two-sail, twelve-foot (3.6 metres) long sailing dinghy. They are sailed extensively in the UK. The class was started in 1936 by the Royal Yachting Association as an alternative to the more expensive International 14s.

National 12 racing

The rules limit the length of the boat to 12 ft, beam to 6 ft 6 in, an all up weight to 78 kg and a sail area of 10.4 m^{2}. National 12s are sailed on all types of water from narrow rivers to the open sea. The class holds a national championships on an annual basis – known as Burton Week after the premier prize of the week: The Sir William Burton Cup – at various venues around the UK coast.

The National 12 is a development class where within a set of rules (and with occasional considered changes to those rules) the boats have been able to evolve over time, moving from wood and clinker construction to high-performance glass and carbon fibre-foam composite boats. There have been over two hundred different designs since the class inception. One of the most noticeable changes in the boats is the steady increase in beam over the history of the class – early examples were less than 5 ft while modern ones are usually at the maximum 6 ft 6 in to provide maximum righting moment for the crew. The Twelve has developed into a racing boat which performs well in all conditions being highly manouvreable and challenging to sail in windy weather.

== The History ==
N153 Witch – 1st Burton Cup winner at the 70th anniversary

National 12s sailing at Ranelagh sailing club in the 1930s

N1 "Gipsy" was designed by Uffa Fox and launched at Cowes in April 1936. The Twelve proved extremely popular and by the first championships in September of that year over 150 boats had been built. Gipsy accepted honourable retirement at the former Exeter Maritime Museum as a landmark in dinghy sailing history. Although his design, the "Uffa King", was very successful Fox himself built only two boats, Anemone N452, and Westwind N456, the latter for Bruce Banks, later to become famous as a sailmaker, in whose hands the boat was successfully campaigned for more than a decade, winning the Burton Cup both in 1939 and again in 1950. Westwind is now in the collection of the National Maritime Museum Cornwall

From 1936 to the present day the class has continued to develop. Rule changes have been made where necessary, for example, a minimum width rule was introduced in 1937, and a maximum width in 1980 . Clinker construction went out in 1970 with the development of GRP hulls and 'four plank' wooden construction.

Ian Proctor started experimenting with metal masts to replace wooden spars in 1952 and Terylene sails arrived in 1954. The minimum weight was reduced to 80 kg in the 1980s.

Feeling Foolish design of National 12 at Northampton 70th anniversary

A further reduction in late 1990s and a recent reduction in 2000 reduced the minimum weight down to the currently 78 kg (this includes mast & centreboard), reflecting the ability of even amateur builders to build lightweight hulls. Today most new boats are built using carbon fibre-foam sandwich construction with a self draining floor. This makes the boats very light and stiff, adding to the responsive character of the boats.

Winged rudders have been mainstream in the class since around 2010. They provide a number of benefits including: allowing the 12 to carry a little more helm/crew weight as they provide lift at the transom, increasing straight line speed in certain conditions and acting as a stabiliser on high speed reaches and runs.

== Handicap and Other Racing ==
In a mixed fleet, the National 12 competes with other boats off a Portsmouth Yardstick handicap of 1064. In mixed fleet racing in North America, it is more likely to use a D-PN of 98.0.
