= Prioria joveri =

Conservation status
- Vulnerable (IUCN 3.1)

Scientific classification
- Kingdom: Plantae
- Clade: Tracheophytes
- Clade: Angiosperms
- Clade: Eudicots
- Clade: Rosids
- Order: Fabales
- Family: Fabaceae
- Genus: Prioria
- Species: P. joveri

Binomial name
- Prioria joveri (Normand ex Aubrév.) Breteler

Synonyms
- Gossweilerodendron joveri Normand ex Aubrév.

Species of legume

Prioria joveri is a species of plant in the family Fabaceae. It is native to Angola, Cameroon, and Gabon, where its natural habitat is subtropical or tropical moist lowland forests. It is threatened by habitat loss.

It is a large tree, with resinous bark. The leaves are pinnate, with 4–5 alternately-arranged leaflets 8 cm long and 2.5 cm broad. The flowers are small, with four (rarely five) white sepals 2 mm long and no petals; they are produced in panicles. The pod superficially resembles a maple samara with a single seed at one end, with the rest of the pod modified into a wing.
