= Pegasus Dinghy =

1958 racing dinghy

The Pegasus is a powerful and fast two person racing and cruising dinghy designed by Uffa Fox in 1959. It was notable for being a boat capable of being built at home using marine ply but still with an efficient and aesthetically pleasing round bilged hull form.

The boat has a narrow bow entry and a planing hull, and it carries a mainsail, a jib, and a large symmetric spinnaker. Stability is achieved with a trapeze allowing this relatively narrow boat by modern standards to carry a large sail plan.

Approximately 250 Pegasus's were constructed, some all wooden and many in composite construction from GRP hulls and marine ply decks and buoyancy tanks. A few all GRP boats were also produced. As of 2007, it was believed that about 30 remained, many of which were still sailing.
