= Planing (boat) =

Mode of watercraft operation

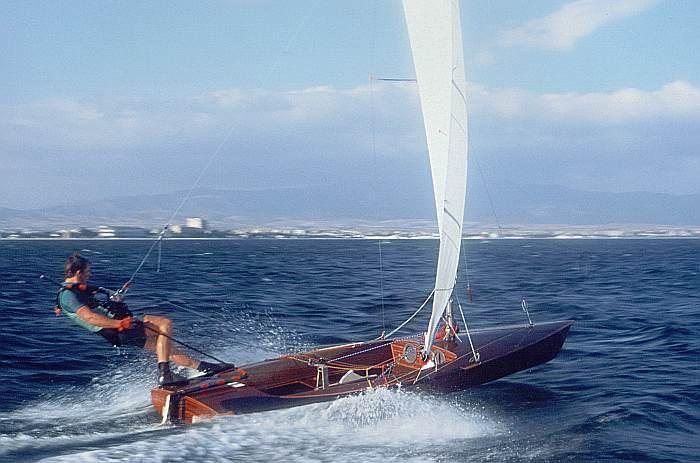
A Contender dinghy planing on a broad reach. Note the typical way the bow lifts up while the stern skims over the water.

Planing (/ˈpleɪnɪŋ/ PLAY-ning) is the mode of operation for a waterborne craft in which its weight is predominantly supported by hydrodynamic lift, rather than hydrostatic lift (buoyancy).

Many forms of marine transport make use of planing, including fast ferries, racing boats, seaplanes, and water skis. Most surfboards are planing or semi-planing hulls. Beyond planing, fast vessel designs have seen a transition to hydrofoil designs.

== History ==
The earliest documented planing sailboat was a proa built in 1898 by Commodore Ralph Munroe. It was capable of speeds of more than twice the hull speed.

Planing a sailing dinghy was first popularised by Uffa Fox in Britain. In 1928 Fox introduced planing to the racing world in his International 14 dinghy, Avenger. That year he gained 52 first places, 2 seconds, and 3 third places out of 57 race starts.

This performance was noticed by other designers who further developed them. Over the years, many dinghies have acquired the ability to plane. Materials advances have allowed for lighter boats that will plane faster and in lighter air. There are now many high-performance dinghies (sometimes called skiffs) that can plane to windward.

== How planing works ==
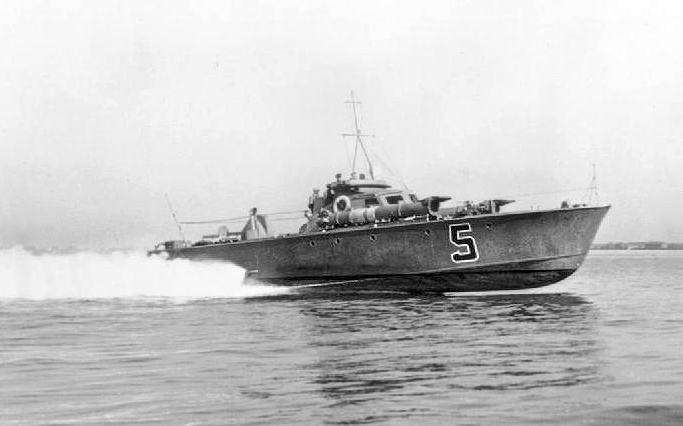
Royal Navy World War II motor torpedo boat planing at speed on calm water showing its hard chine hull - note how most of the forepart of the boat is out of the water

At rest, a vessel's weight is borne entirely by the buoyant force. Every hull acts as a displacement hull at low speeds: the buoyant force is mainly responsible for supporting the craft. As speed increases, hydrodynamic lift increases, and the buoyant force decreases as the hull lifts out of the water, decreasing the displaced volume. At some speed, lift becomes the predominant upward force on the hull and the vessel is planing.

A simple model of this effect is a solid slab of material that is heavier than water (like a steel plate) but is shaped and oriented to have a positive angle of attack. At rest, the slab will sink because it is heavier than water; the buoyant forces are overwhelmed by the force of gravity. However, if the slab is kept in the same orientation and pulled horizontally through the water, it will force the incoming water downward. This results in a reactive force upward on the slab. At a high enough speed, this reactionary force (plus any small buoyant force) is larger than the force of gravity and the slab will stay afloat. In this way, the horizontal force (which may be supplied by a motor or a sail) is converted into a vertical force upward. Planing is achieved by hydrodynamic lift and is analogous with aerodynamic lift (See lift on an airfoil).

Although any hull will plane if enough power is provided and enough speed is attained, a hull designed for operation in the planing realm is sometimes distinguished by a flat run aft. In other words, in side view, the bottom is more or less a straight line toward the stern. (Exceptions to this include surfboards and other recreational planing hulls, which utilize rocker throughout for enhanced maneuverability when banking through turns.) In contrast, in a displacement, or non-planing hull, the bottom is curved in side view (the curvature is called "rocker") all the way from bow to stern, in order to minimize wave drag. In front view, the sections in the aft area may be straight, as in a racing hydroplane, to maximize planing forces and speed, but for practical reasons of stability and comfortable ride are often V-shaped, especially in boats intended for offshore use.

To plane, especially to initiate planing, the power-to-weight ratio must be high, since the planing mode of operation involves moving the hull at speeds higher than its natural hull speed. All boat designs for planing benefit from minimised weight; planing powerboats are commonly made from light alloy or use other reduced-weight construction techniques- RIBs are typical examples. Planing sailing boats need a good sail area and powerboats need a high-power engine. Steps and chine ridges may also be incorporated into the design to encourage both ease of planing and stability.

Most surfboards, although unpowered, are planing or semi-planing hulls. They utilize the push of the waveform more or less in combination with gravity and specific angles of attack for the hydrofoil to maximise propulsive force and reduce the net downforce and thus achieve planing lift.

== Sailing techniques used to promote planing ==
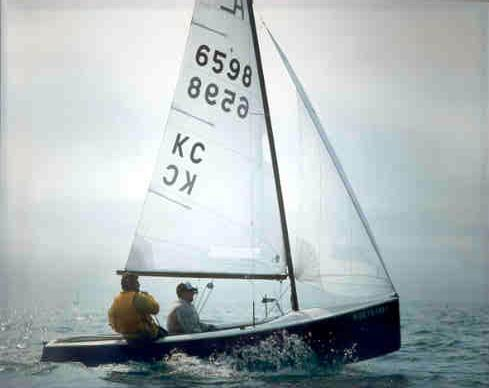
Albacore dinghy planing

Planing may be achieved in most sailing dinghies. In light to moderate conditions, planing is best initiated by a combination of the following.

- Maximise power: Sail on a reach or broad reach to begin.
- Minimise surface-induced drag: Raise the centreboard or daggerboard about halfway
- Maintain power: When a gust hits, bear away slightly and ease the sheets.
- As a gust begins to pass, steer slightly to windward to keep the apparent wind forward.
- Maintain flat form of immersed sections of hull: Keep the hull level side-to-side, trapeze if necessary.
- Move passenger weight aft to lift the bow.
- Maintain power if necessary: flick or pump the sails (although there are some restrictions on doing this in a race).
- Seek optimal form and speed of immersed hull: if there are waves, surf down them to initiate planing.

== See also ==
- Hydroplane (boat), racing powerboats designed to use lift from the hull to reduce drag
- Hydrofoil, a more advanced concept to further reduce drag by supporting the weight of the hull on specialised wings at speed
- Dinghy racing
- Dinghy sailing
- Sportsboat
- Windsurfing
