= Ocean Bird =

Class of trimaran sailboat

Development
- Designer: John Westell
- Location: United Kingdom
- Year: circa 1970
- Role: cruiser
- Name: Ocean Bird

Boat
- Draft: 1.2 m (3.9 ft)—1.34 m (4.4 ft)

Hull
- Type: Trimaran
- Construction: Steel beam and GRP
- Hull weight: 6,000 kg (13,000 lb)
- LOA: 30 ft (9.1 m)
- Beam: 11 ft 5 in (3.48 m) (folded); 22 ft 6 in (6.86 m) (extended)

Hull appendages
- Keel: Fixed or retractable.

The Ocean Bird is a class of trimaran sailboat designed by John Westell and produced by Honnor Marine Ltd. at Totnes, Teignmouth in the 1970s, featuring fold-in lateral floats on a webless steel-beam frame chosen to provide stability against heeling, yet allow a compact footprint in harbour.

== Overview ==
David Owen provided an overview in a 1970 review of the sailing craft. He noted the following:

- Multihulls owe their stability to their wide stance, which provides less yielding of the rig to heeling and thereby requires stronger support of the mast and rigging, but allows a much shallower draft than for a monohull. The vessel has a centreboard, instead of a fixed keel to minimize leeway.
- Ocean Bird trimarans are configured as "a monohull with two smaller, sleeker wing hulls mounted as outriggers". The outriggers fold in toward the main hull, when needed to save space when in harbour—a configuration that allows for motoring, but not sailing.
- The vessel has two berths forward, a marine toilet, washbasin, sail locker, and hanging locker in the center. The main cabin accommodates a dining area and galley.
- Owen quoted designer, Westell, as saying, "If a trimaran is properly built to stand up to bad weather stresses, it's just about the safest thing afloat. It's light enough and buoyant enough to use as its own life raft if all else fails."

== See also ==
- List of multihulls
