= Albacore (dinghy) =

Two-person dinghy for competitive racing

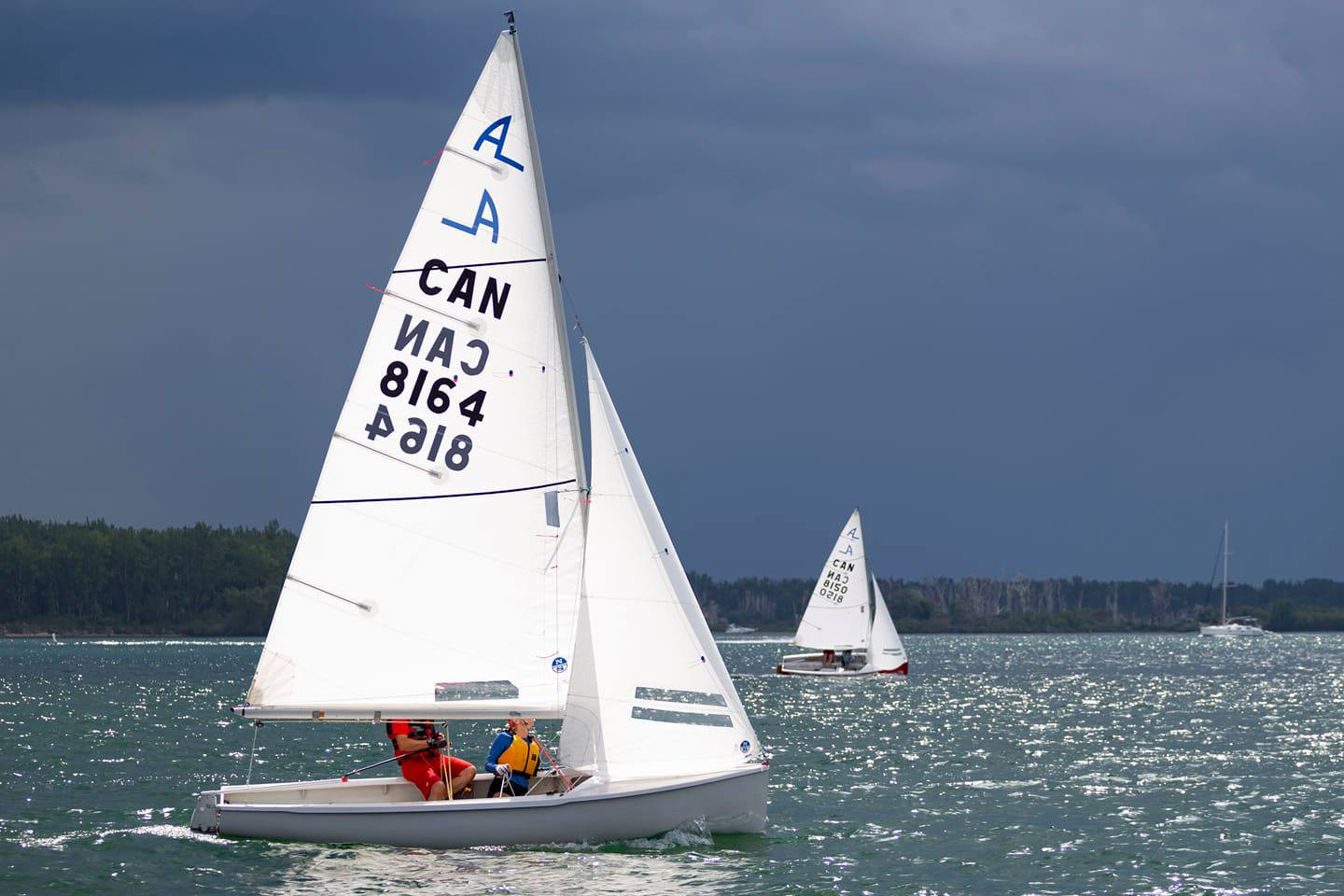

Development
- Year: 1954

Boat
- Crew: 2
- Draft: 1,270 mm (4 ft 2 in) (foils down) 200 mm (8 in) (foils up)

Hull
- Hull weight: 109 kg (240 lb)
- LOA: 4,570 mm (15 ft 0 in)
- Beam: 1,550 mm (5 ft 1 in)

Sails
- Mainsail area: 8.36 m^{2} (90 sq ft)
- Jib/genoa area: 3.25 m^{2} (35 sq ft)
- Upwind sail area: 11.61 m^{2} (125 sq ft)

Racing
- D-PN: 90.3
- RYA PN: 1062

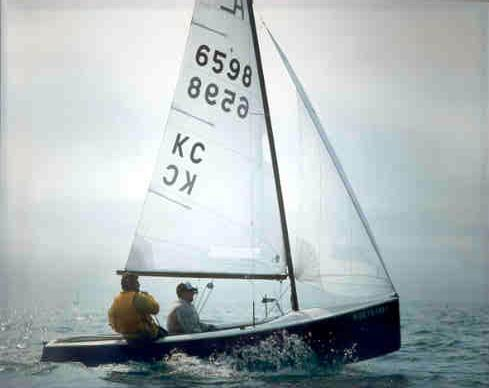
An Albacore dinghy planing

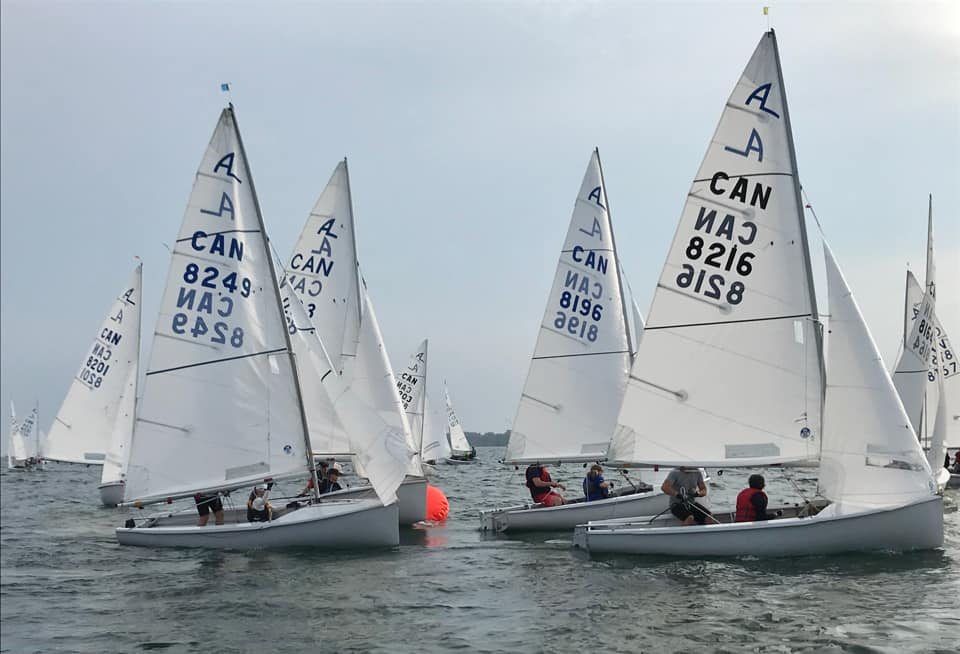
Albacore racing fleet rounding the windward mark

The Albacore is a 4.57 m (15 ft) two-person planing dinghy with fractional sloop rig, for competitive racing and lake and near-inshore day sailing. Hulls are made of either wood or fiberglass. The basic shape was developed in 1954 from an Uffa Fox design, the Swordfish. Recent boats retain the same classic dimensions, and use modern materials and modern control systems.

A deep airfoil section centerboard and rudder make the Albacore highly maneuverable. The Albacore's rig uses swept spreaders supporting a tapered mast, a powerful vang, and adjustable jib halyard and other sail controls to depower in high winds. This adjustability enables light crews and heavy crews to race head-to-head in all but the most extreme conditions. It does not have a trapeze or spinnaker, and hence avoids the difficult handling of sport boats. The powerful rig and easily driven hull give excellent performance over a wide range of wind and wave conditions.

The 2011 international champion described the Albacore as a boat that is simple to get into at first, but one that will challenge the tuning and tactical skills of a sailor for the rest of their life. Recent champions have been graduates of college sailing teams.

== The first Albacore ==
The first Albacore (number 1) was built by Clive Dollery and Dave Lowe, who adapted Uffa Fox's design. They were both junior members of the Locks Sailing club in Portsmouth, England (UK) in the 1950s. They crewed in a variety of boats including Lowe's National 12, but they were also keen amateur boat builders.

Dollery wanted a boat to race. They wanted to start with a ready made hull. Lowe's father and Uffa Fox had discussed and agreed to build a non-standard Flying 25 with significant changes made. So they assumed that the same agreement could be applied to a Swordfish sailing dinghy also designed by Fox.

A Swordfish hull was obtained from Fairey Marine via a local boat builder. They modified the hull moving the position of the mast, cutting a slot and fitting a keel box. Several members of the Locks Sailing club were interested in this project and formed a committee with Fairey Marine, resulting in the 'committee modified Swordfish'. This was renamed the 'Albacore'. The committee agreed that this boat be allocated Albacore number 1.

The Locks Sailing club soon had a fleet of about 20 Albacores that raced regularly against one another. In 1958 the National Albacore championships were held under the burgee of the Locks Sailing Club, in Langstone Harbour with a fleet of 46 boats.

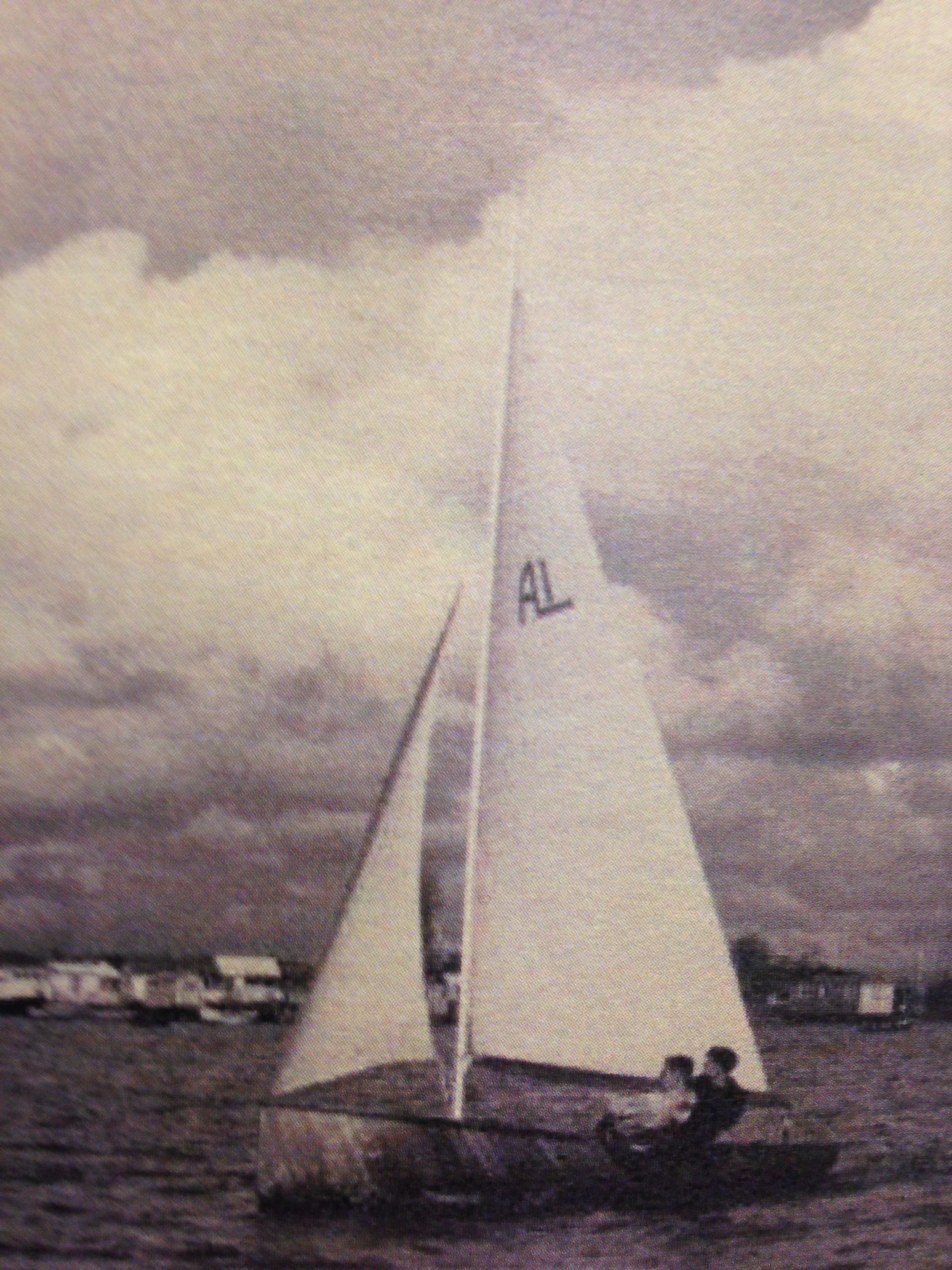
Lowe and Dollery on Albacore 1

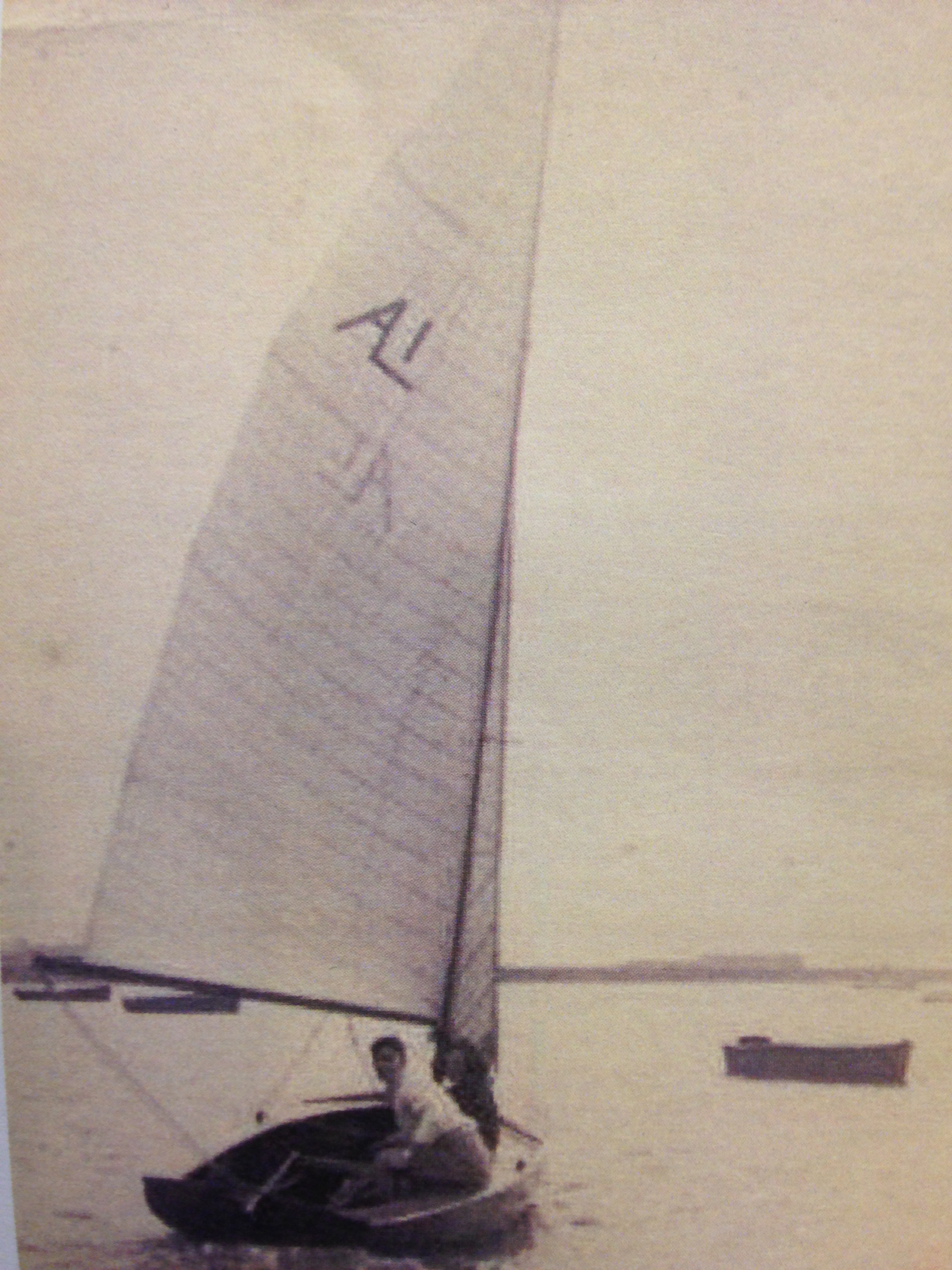
Albacore 1

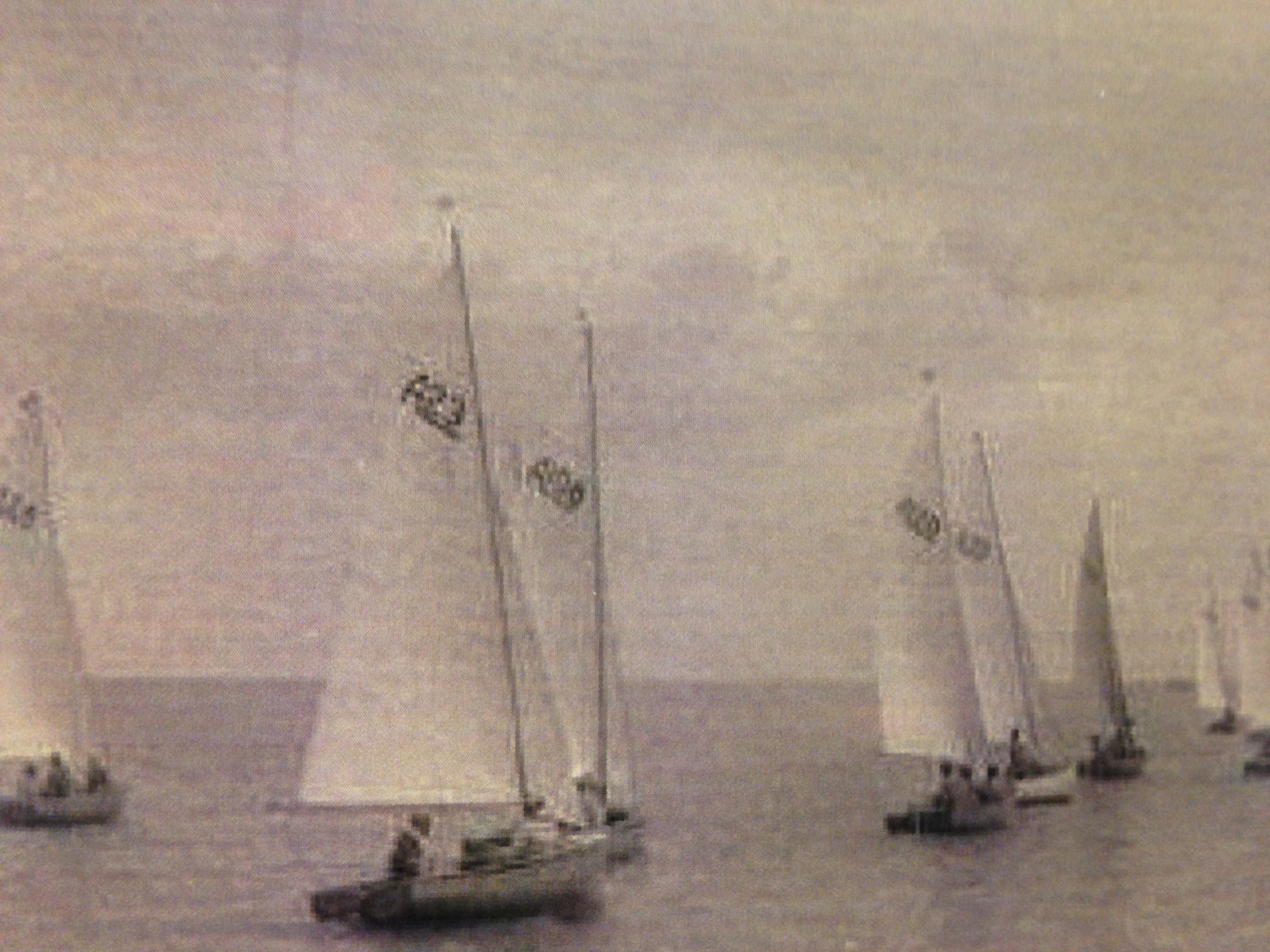
Albacore Fleet

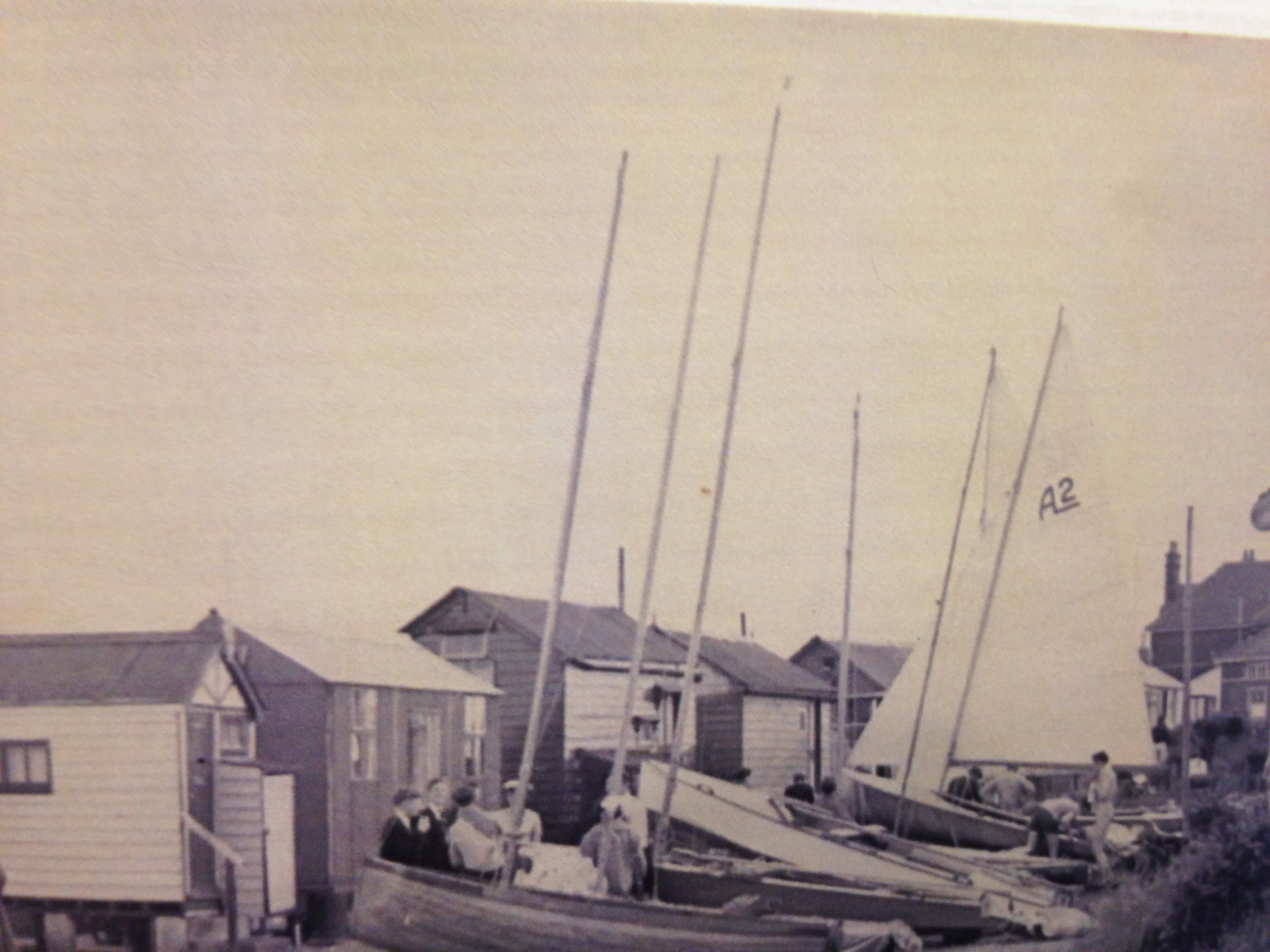
Albacore on land

== Popularity ==
About 8,200 Albacores have been built. The class is actively raced in Canada, the United Kingdom, and the United States. Albacores are also used for adult and youth sail training, and for leisure sailing.

The Albacore was ranked 16th most popular one-design sailboat in North America in 2010 by Sailing Anarchy, and 38th most popular in the UK from 2001 to 2011 by Yachts and Yachting.

There is a particularly large concentration of Albacores in Toronto, Ontario, Canada where the Friday night club series sees an average of 45 boats and peaks of over 60 boats on the start line every Friday during the summer sailing season.

Older Albacores are commonly found in vacation areas such as Ontario Cottage country.

== Competitions ==
The Albacore class offers an active racing program, attracting experienced sailors as well as new enthusiasts. With local club racing, regional regattas, and international championships, the class provides racing opportunities for every level of experience and interest. In addition, Albacores compete with other boats in a mixed fleet by means of the Portsmouth Yardstick handicap scheme. Its Portsmouth number is 1062 and its D-PN is 90.3.

The Class has a biannual International (World) Championship with the venue alternating between the three key countries where the class is sailed. The earliest such event was in 1971, and was won by Canadians Jack Langmaid and Nancy Langmaid in a Fairey Marine Albacore.

Recent International events:

Year	Location	Winners
2005	Lyme Regis in Dorset, England	
2007	West River Sailing Club in Galesville, US	
2009	Largs, Scotland	Barney Harris and David Byron
2011	Toronto, Canada	Barney Harris and David Byron
2013	Abersoch, Wales	Barney Harris and David Byron
2015	Sarasota, US	George Carter and Almir Tavares
2017	Weymouth and Portland National Sailing Academy, England	Tom Lonsdale and Stephen Graham
2019	Shelburne, Canada	Neville Herbert and Mark Fowler
2021	(no event)	
2023	South Caernarvonshire Yacht Club, Abersoch, Wales	Neville Herbert and Lewis Fowler
2025	Hampton Roads, Virginia, US	Barney Harris and David Byron

The next International Championship is scheduled to take place at Lyme Regis in Dorset, England in 2027.

== Manufacture ==
Two manufacturers of Albacores produced boats in 2011 to 2013: Ovington Boats in the UK and Hapco Marine in the USA. The boats were primarily delivered to UK, Canadian and US destinations.

Notable earlier manufacturers include Ontario Yachts, Skene, Woof, Kingsfield Marine, Fairey Marine, Grampian Marine, McGruer&Clarke, JD Young, Rondar, Lockley, Lockley-Newport, and Whitby Boat Works. The first fiberglass version of the boat was made by Whitby Boat Works and sold as the Albatross. Shortly thereafter, fiberglass version of the Albacore appeared.

== Family use ==
The hull weight of an Albacore is 109 kg (240 lbs). Therefore, the Albacore can be road-trailered, with 1 or 2 Albacores behind a typical family car. With appropriate road-trailer design, the boat can be loaded and unloaded using only 2 people.

The Albacore is frequently used as a first boat for those who are just learning to sail, and as a very competitive racer for more advanced sailors.

Regatta results show that this class of boat is often sailed by husband/wife and parent/child combinations, and that some of the all-women teams are the most competitive in the class.

== Rigging and materials ==
All Albacores ever made are considered identical for the purpose of racing, and can race together without a handicap. However, many details and materials be improved or modified at the choice of the individual owner or manufacturer, provided that the basic dimensions and materials meet the class specification.

The rigging of early Albacores was very simple, including such basic features as a flat centerboard and fixed jib fairleads. This rigging allowed only limited adjustability of sails.

Modern Albacore designs have evolved sophisticated control systems for their running rigging and standing rigging. This greatly increases their versatility compared to earlier boats, and they can be sailed in 2 knots to 25 knots of wind.

A typical modern design for an Albacore includes:

- Epoxy foam sandwich fibreglass hull (Modern wood hulls are also manufactured, but are less common)
- Tapered aluminum mast
- Lightweight aluminum boom
- Automatic fly-away jib stick
- Moulded or wood/fiberglass composite centerboard with symmetric airfoil cross-section
- Kick-up rudder with symmetric airfoil cross-section
- Suction self-bailers (which empty a boat after capsize in 4 minutes)
- Adjustable continuous 16:1 vang and 12:1 jib halyard, rigged to side control panel
- 4:1 main-sail outhaul, 2:1 main-sail Cunningham, jib Cunningham
- Adjustable hiking straps for crew and helm
- Extended jib tracks for high- & low-aspect jibs
- Split-tail mainsheet
- Deck mounted 6:1 mast pre-bend adjuster and 2:1 rope mast ram
