= Alistair Currey =

British sailor

Personal information
- Full name: Charles Alistair Currey
- Nationality: British
- Born: 6 November 1947 (age 77)
- Height: 180 cm (5 ft 11 in)

Charles Alistair Currey (born 6 November 1947) is a British sailor who competed in the 1972 Summer Olympics.
