= 505 (dinghy) =

International racing sailing class

International 505
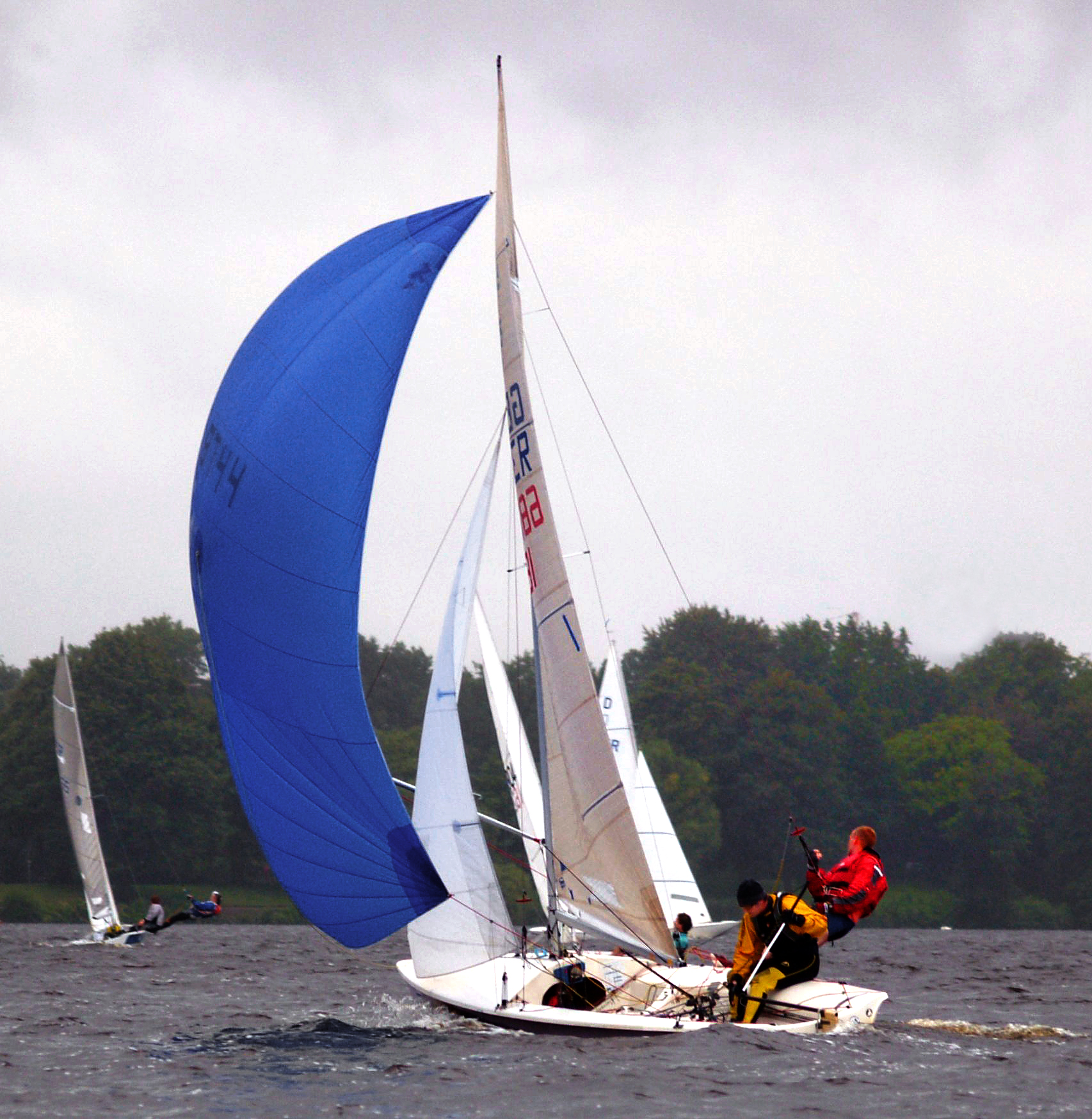

- International 505 Logo

Development
- Designer: John Westell
- Year: 1954

Boat
- Crew: 2
- Draft: 1.45 m (4 ft 9 in)
- Trapeze: 1

Hull
- Type: Monohull
- Construction: unrestricted
- Hull weight: 127.4 kg (281 lb)
- LOA: 5.05 m (16.6 ft)
- LOH: 5.05 m (16.6 ft)
- Beam: 1.88 m (6 ft 2 in)

Rig
- Rig type: Bermuda Sloop
- Mast height: 6.9 m (23 ft)

Sails
- Mainsail area: 12.3 m^{2} (132 sq ft)
- Jib/genoa area: 4.94 m^{2} (53.2 sq ft)
- Spinnaker area: 27 m^{2} (290 sq ft)
- Upwind sail area: 17.3 m^{2} (186 sq ft)
- Downwind sail area: 44.3 m^{2} (477 sq ft)
- Total sail area: 44.3 m^{2} (477 sq ft)

Rating
- D-PN: 79.8
- RYA PN: 896
- PHRF: 149.4

The International 505 is a One-Design high-performance two-person monohull planing sailing dinghy, with spinnaker, utilising a trapeze for the crew.

== History ==
The origins of the class began in 1953 with the creation of the 18-foot 'Coronet' dinghy designed by John Westell. This sailboat competed in the International Yacht Racing Union (IYRU) selection trials at La Baule, France, in 1953 for a new two-person performance dinghy for the Olympics. Although the Coronet lost Olympic selection to the Flying Dutchman, in 1954 the Caneton Association of France asked Westell to modify his design to create for them a 5-metre performance dinghy that would be suitable to their needs. Westell settled on a measured length 5.05 m to allow for boat-building tolerances of the day, and the resulting craft became known as the 505.

The class achieved international status with the IYRU in 1955.

== Production ==
As of 2022, about 9,250 505s had been built.

There have been many builders over the 60-year history of the class. At present Rondar Raceboats is the most prolific builder, producing wet-layup hulls on a semi-production basis. Ovington Boats, which at one time built hulls for Rondar under contract, now build their own.

List of current 505 hull builders:

Builder	Location	Description	Website
Rondar Raceboats	Great Britain	Hulls and complete boats	www.rondarraceboats.com
Ovington Boats	Great Britain	Bare hulls only	www.ovingtonboats.com
Parker 505	Great Britain	Bare hulls and complete boats	
Van Munster Boats	Australia	Bare hulls and complete boats	www.vanmunsterboats.com
Duvoisin Nautique	Switzerland	Bare hulls only	http://duvoisinnautique.ch/en

It is typical for sailors to purchase bare hulls, spars and foils, and then rig the boats themselves. The result is that there is a wide variety of setups, with some notable regional preferences. For example, US boats traditionally have end-boom sheeting while German boats have mid-boom. This has led to the establishment of several rigging businesses, led by successful 505 sailors, that have developed standard rigging setups and sell complete boats based on bare hulls sourced from builders. These include Holger Jess with SegelsportJESS in Kiel, GER and Ian Pinnell of Pinnell & Bax in Northampton, GBR. Having standard setups with published tuning settings helps non-professional sailors become competitive more quickly. Similarly with sails. There is a handful of sailmakers that dominate the 505 class: Pinnell & Bax in the UK, Bojsen-Møller in Europe, Glaser and North in the US and Narval in Poland.

== Design ==
The hulls of early 505s were built in cold-molded marine plywood, new hulls are now built using composite molding: glass fibre and/or carbon fibre mats and vinylester or epoxy resin using either a wet layup technique or using heat-cured prepreg sheets. Hulls are usually cored with foam, balsa or Nomex to increase stiffness and durability, spars traditionally were manufactured from aluminium alloy, later rule changes have permitted the use of carbon fibre for boom and spinnaker pole.

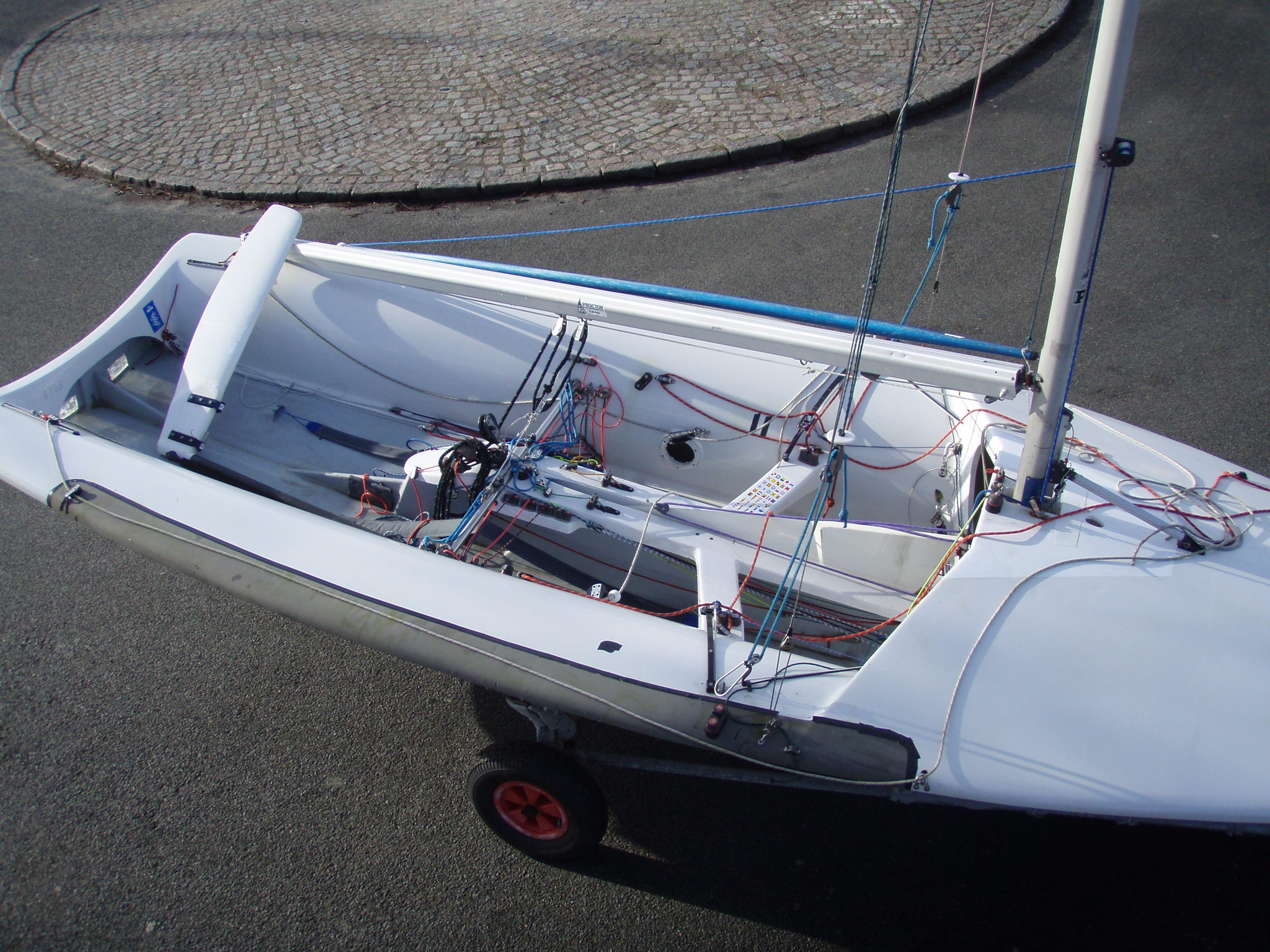
Cockpit and lines

The hull shape and sail plan are tightly controlled, while the spars, foils and rigging are more open which allows the boat's rig and controls to be set up to the preferences of the crew, rather than dictated by the class rules.

== Operational history ==
The 505 is a large boat by dinghy standards, with a powerful sailplan, especially with the adoption in October 2001 of a larger spinnaker. The 505 will plane upwind in wind speeds of around 10 knots or more.

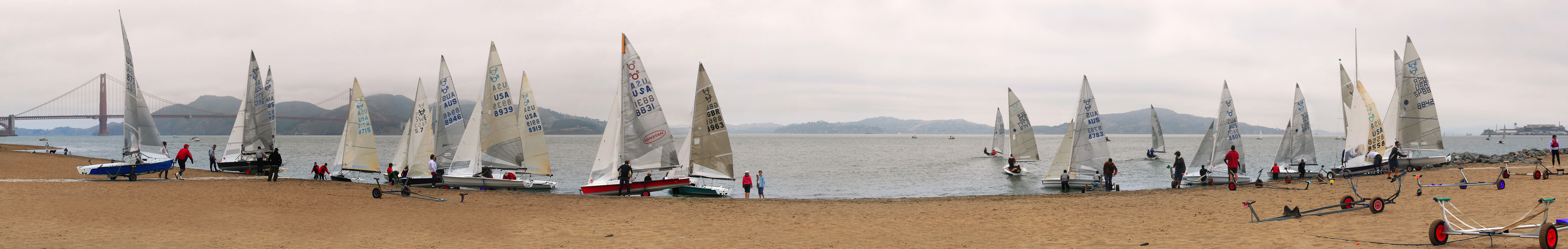
Preparation for schooner race (SAP 5O5 World Championship). The 505 is named for its length, 5.05 meters (16.5 feet).

=== World Championships ===
The International 505 Class Association organises an annual world championships which typically take place in Europe every other year and then elsewhere in the world on the alternating years. Some of the most famous names in sailing have competed at these championships and a lucky few have made the podium list below.
