= Prioria balsamifera =

Conservation status
- Endangered (IUCN 2.3)

Scientific classification
- Kingdom: Plantae
- Clade: Tracheophytes
- Clade: Angiosperms
- Clade: Eudicots
- Clade: Rosids
- Order: Fabales
- Family: Fabaceae
- Genus: Prioria
- Species: P. balsamifera

Binomial name
- Prioria balsamifera (Verm.) Breteler

Synonyms
- Gossweilerodendron balsamiferum (Verm.) Harms; Pterygopodium balsamiferum (Verm.)

Species of legume

Prioria balsamifera, the agba or tola, is a tall forest tree in the family Fabaceae. It is native to lowland tropical rainforest in west Africa, from Nigeria southwards to the Congo Basin in Angola, Cameroon, Republic of the Congo, Democratic Republic of the Congo, Equatorial Guinea, Gabon, scattered or in local pockets, favouring deep soil and plenty of moisture. It is threatened by habitat loss and over-cutting for timber.

It is a large to very large tree growing to 60 m tall, with a trunk 70–180 cm diameter with resinous bark. The leaves are pinnate, with 6–10 alternately-arranged leaflets 4–9 cm long and 2–4 cm broad. The flowers are small, with four (rarely five) white sepals 2 mm long and no petals; they are produced in panicles. The pod is 10–14 cm long and 3.5–4.5 cm broad, superficially resembling a maple samara with a single 2–3 cm seed at one end, with the rest of the pod modified into a wing. It has a high spruce gum content.

Other names for this tree are achi, egba, emongi (Nigeria), tola blanc (Congo-Brazzaville), tola branca (Angola), N'Tola (Zaire).
