= Uffa Fox =

English sailboat designer

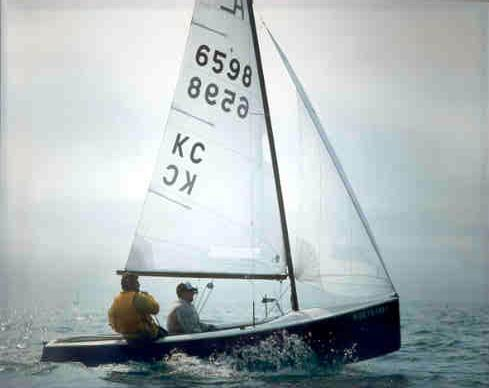
Albacore planing dinghy, designed and built by Fox

Uffa Fox CBE (15 January 1898 – 26 October 1972) was an English boat designer and sailing enthusiast, responsible for a number of innovations in boat design. Not afraid of courting controversy or causing offence, he is remembered for his eccentric behaviour and pithy quotes, as much as for his original boat designs.

== Life ==
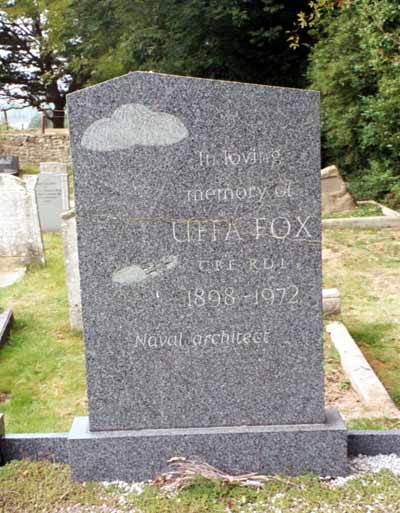
Grave of Uffa Fox, Whippingham, Isle of Wight, showing lifeboat of his design on parachute

Fox was born on the Isle of Wight and was raised in East Cowes. He lived for a while in Puckaster on the Isle of Wight.

In July 1921, Fox and a crew of nine sea scouts departed for the western Solent in a 27-foot (8.2 m) open whaler under the parental expectation that they were on a camping/sailing trip. He decided to extend the itinerary up the Seine towards Paris. In seven days, they travelled within 70 kilometres of the city when they turned around to return another five days later. After being met by the coast guard as presumed castaways, Fox was relieved of his role in the sea scouts.

He was the subject of This Is Your Life in January 1963 when he was surprised by Eamonn Andrews at the Colston Hall in Bristol. He was also among the crew of the Typhoon, an account of which was written and published by William Washburn Nutting in In the Track of Typhoon (1922). Fox joined the crew in England for her transatlantic return via France, Spain, and the Azores into New York City.

He was a founding participant in the 1950s annual sea-side cricket match on Bramble Bank in the central Solent.

Fox died in October 1972.

== Work ==
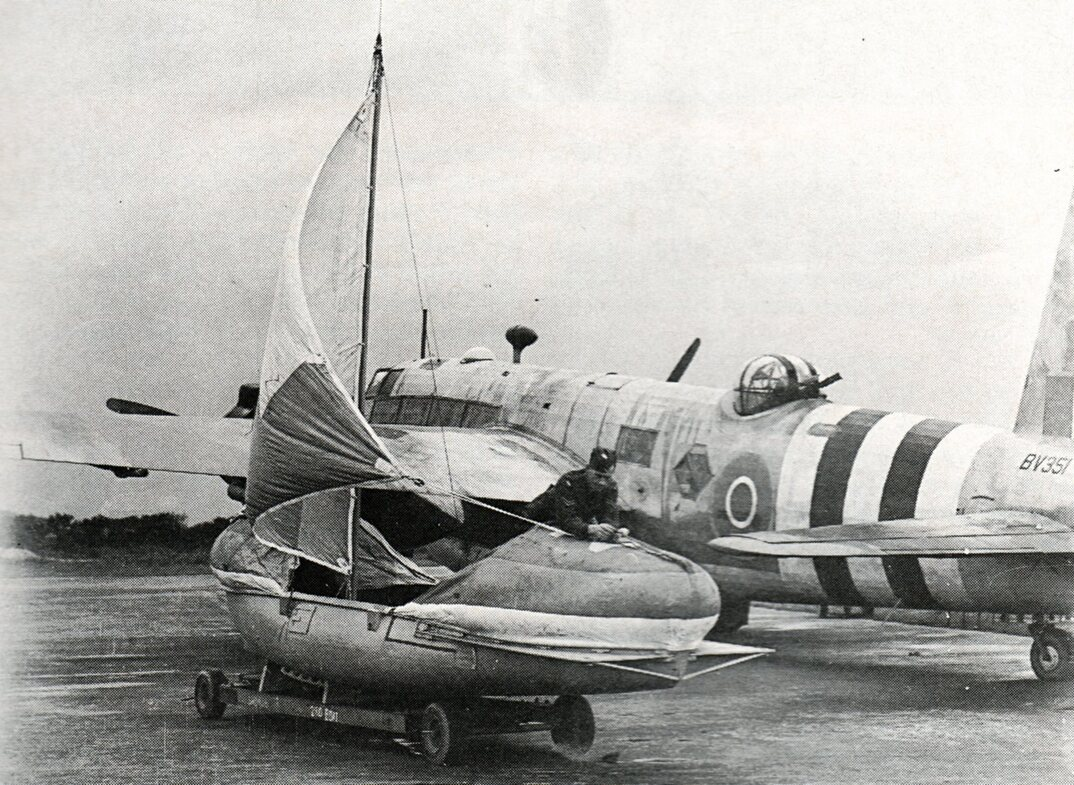
A Fox-designed airborne lifeboat, shown rigged for sailing, in front of a Vickers Warwick

Fox was responsible for innovations in dinghy sailing that enhanced the popularity of the sport. His designs introduced planing hulls and trapezing to dinghy racing.

=== Sailboat racing ===
Prince Philip, Duke of Edinburgh and Fox became friends in 1949 and raced together frequently at Cowes Week aboard Fox's Dragon "Fresh Breeze" or the Duke's 'Royal' Dragon "Bluebottle". He also took the Royal children sailing at Cowes. Philip said of Fox in a foreword to his biography, “His life was one long campaign for the freedom of the human spirit and against the foolish, the stupid and the self-important, the whole conducted with a cheerful breeziness that disarmed all but the hardest of cases.”

=== Boat design ===
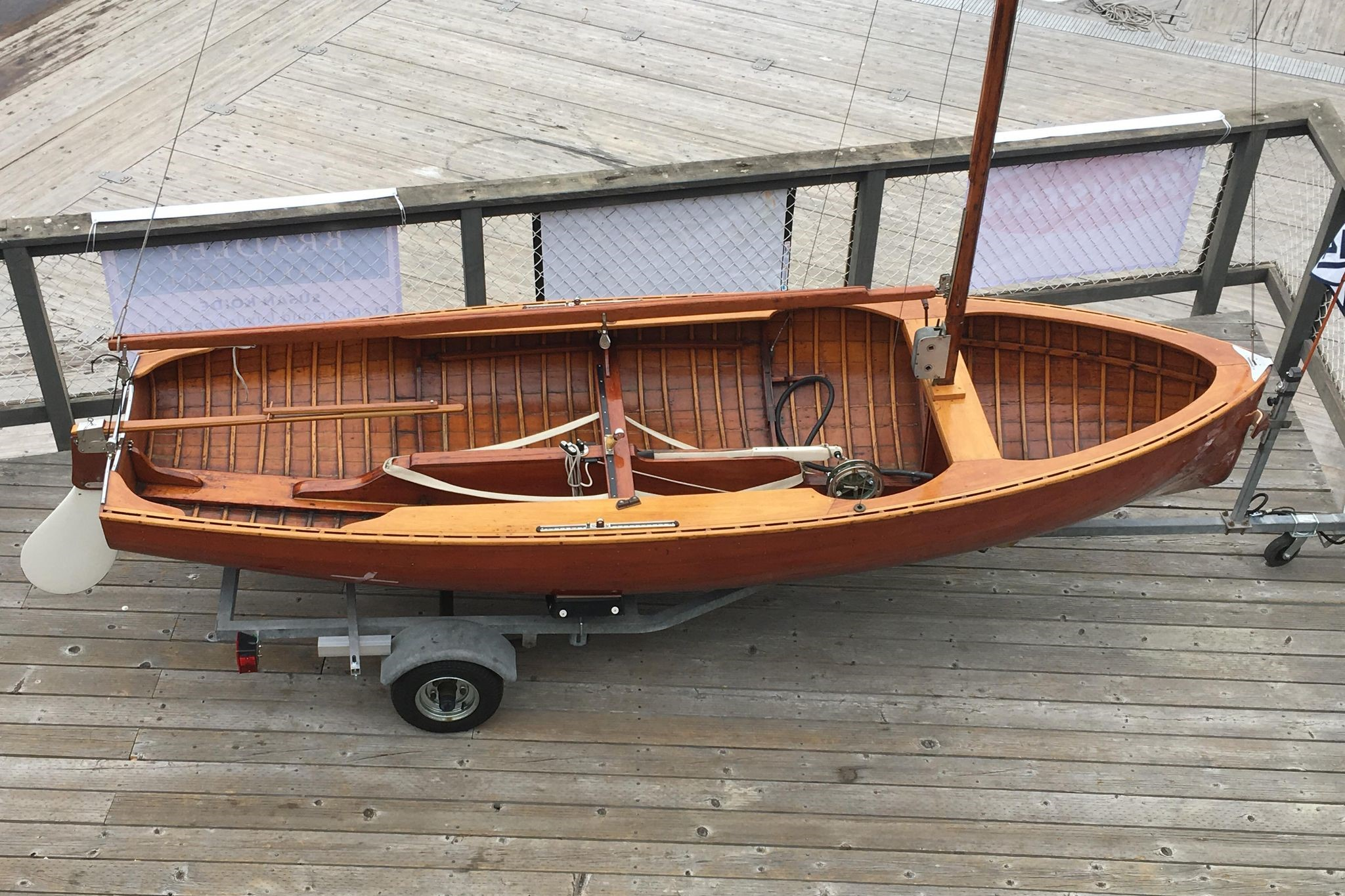
1939 International 14 Dinghy, designed by Fox

About 1943 he designed a 27-foot (8.2 m) lifeboat to be dropped from Vickers Warwick aircraft when rescuing downed aircrew or mariners; its deficiencies led to the more sturdy American A-1 lifeboat. An example of this craft and of others built and/or designed by Fox are in the collections of the Classic Boat Museum at East Cowes, Isle of Wight. These boats could be released from under the aeroplane retarded by six 32-foot (9.8 m) diameter parachutes. Although initially adapted for the Warwick, the lifeboat was subsequently also carried by Air-Sea Rescue Lancasters and B-17 Flying Fortresses. The museum also holds a large collection of photographs by and about Fox.

He established boat design and building businesses in the south of England. He designed many of the significant classes of boats around today, including the planing International 14, the Foxhound, the Foxcub and Super Foxcub, the Flying Fifteen, the Flying Ten, the National 12, the National 18, the Albacore, the Swordfish, the Firefly, the Javelin, the Pegasus Dinghy, the Jollyboat and the Day Sailer. Many of his designs exploited the wartime developments of moulded plywood, extruded aluminium, Tufnol etc.

In addition to dinghies, he designed several keelboats all loosely based on the same concept as the Flying Fifteen, with separate fin keel and rudder. They were very lightweight compared with other boats of the era. Huff of Arklow for Douglas Heard was 30'-0" on the waterline and Flying Fox for Fred Brownlee was 35'-0" waterline length.

Uffa Fox designed the Britannia rowing boat, used by John Fairfax for the first solo-rowing expedition across the Atlantic Ocean in 1969. The Britannia was described as "the Rolls-Royce of rowing boats, made of mahogany." It was self-righting, self-bailing and partly covered. He also designed Britannia II, used by Fairfax and Sylvia Cook to row across the Pacific Ocean in 1971 through 1972.
