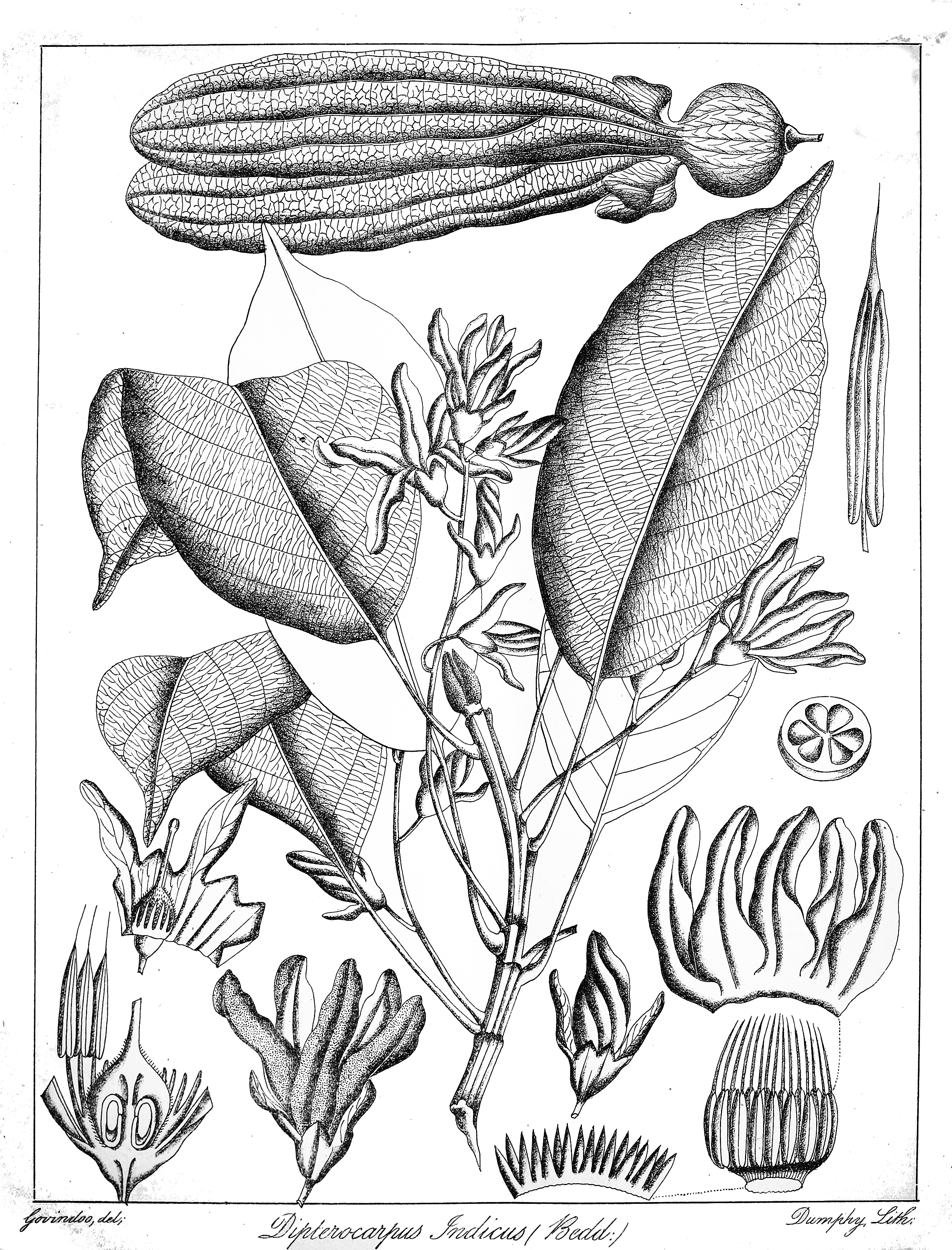

Conservation status
- Endangered (IUCN 3.1)

Scientific classification
- Kingdom: Plantae
- Clade: Tracheophytes
- Clade: Angiosperms
- Clade: Eudicots
- Clade: Rosids
- Order: Malvales
- Family: Dipterocarpaceae
- Genus: Dipterocarpus
- Species: D. indicus

Binomial name
- Dipterocarpus indicus Bedd.

= Dipterocarpus indicus =

Species of tree

Dipterocarpus indicus is a species of large tree in the family Dipterocarpaceae endemic to the Western Ghats of India. It is recognised as an endangered species under the IUCN Red List of Threatened Species 2021.

== Description ==
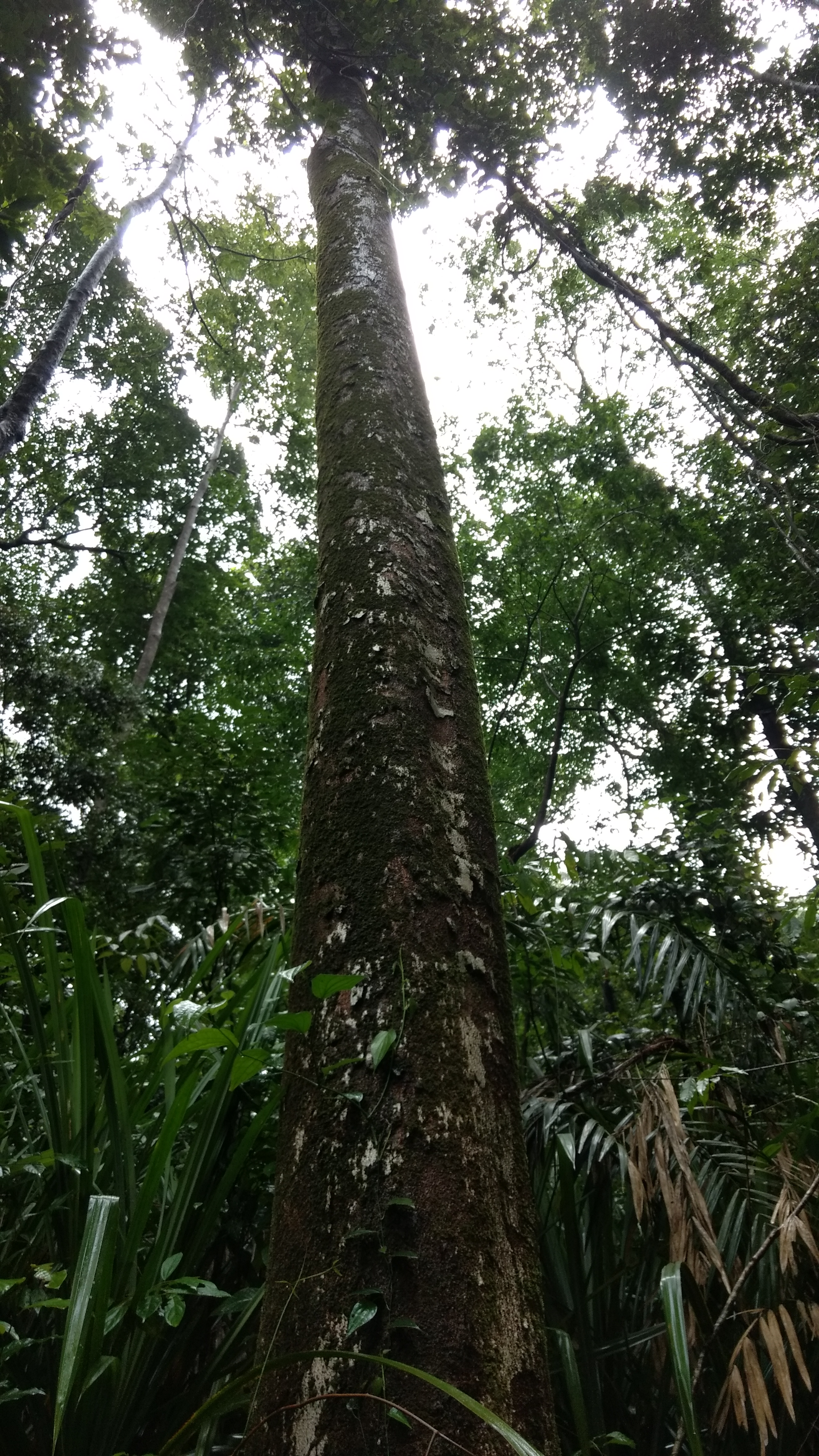
Dipterocarpus indicus tree

These are emergent trees that can attain height about 50 m and girth up to 2 m. Leaves are simple and show alternate phyllotaxy. Mostly seen as clustered towards the end of branches. They are pubescent when young and glabrous when mature. Size: 8-20 × 6-10 cm. Leaf shape can be described as broadly elliptic or ovate. Leaf apex is shortly acuminate. Ten to thirteen pairs of strong and parallel secondary nerves are seen. Petiole length is about 3 cm.

Flowers are white and seen in axillary racemes. Fruits are smooth with 3 short and 2 long, enlarged, wing like, persistent calyx lobes.

== Distribution ==
This is a rare tree seen in low and medium elevation evergreen forests of Western Ghats from Northern Karnataka to Southern Kerala. Elevation range is from 400 m to 900 m.

== Gallery ==
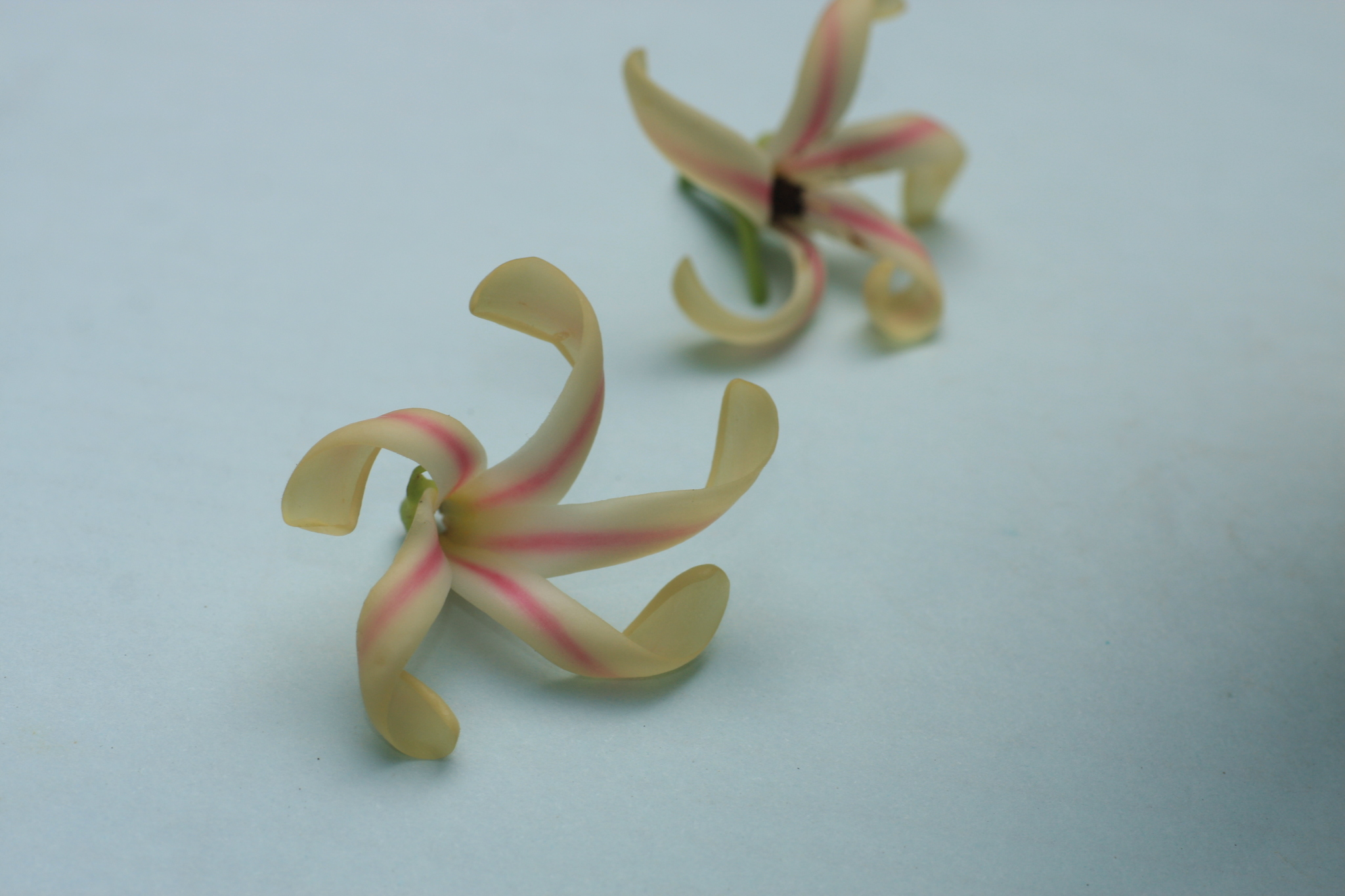
Flower

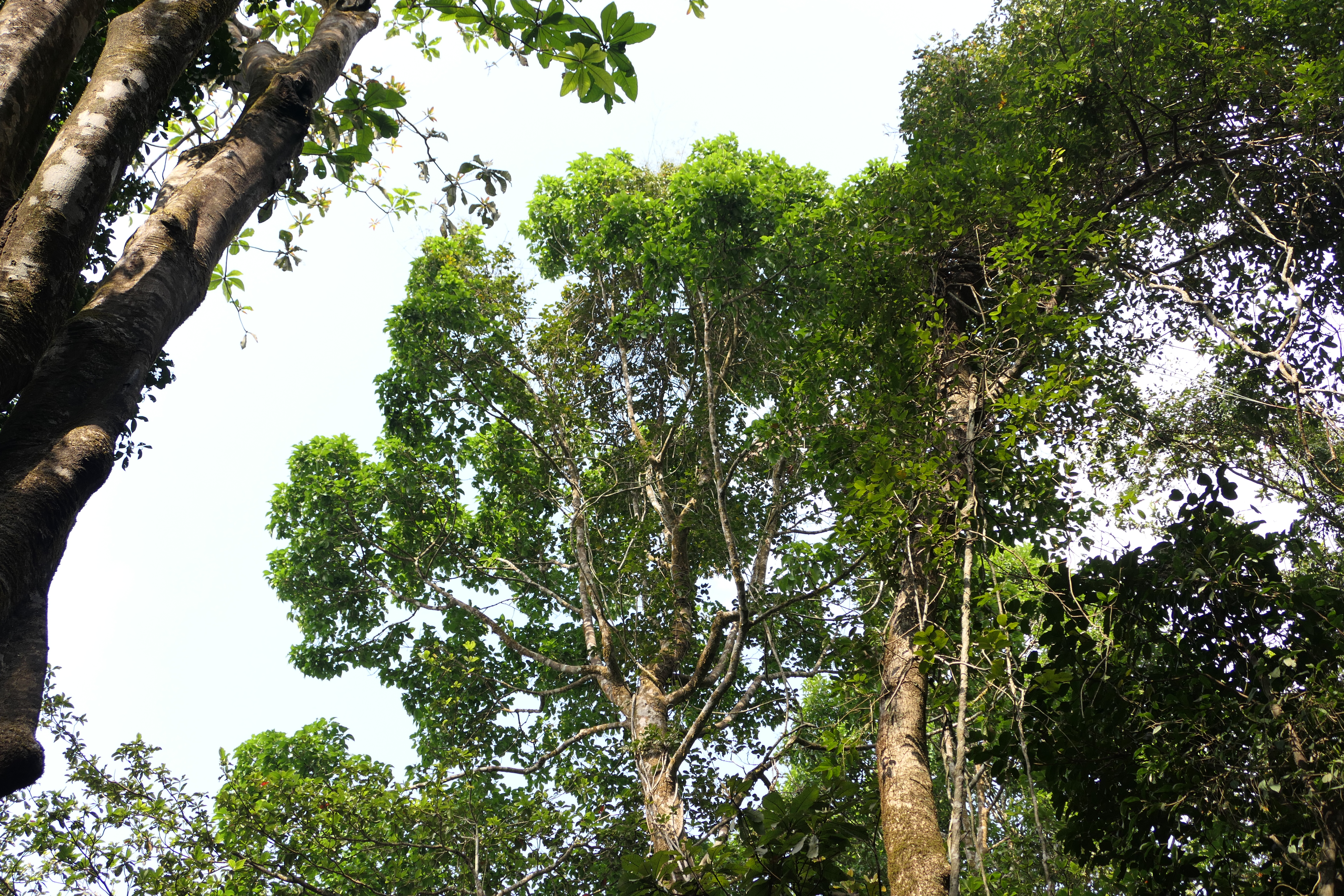
Tree

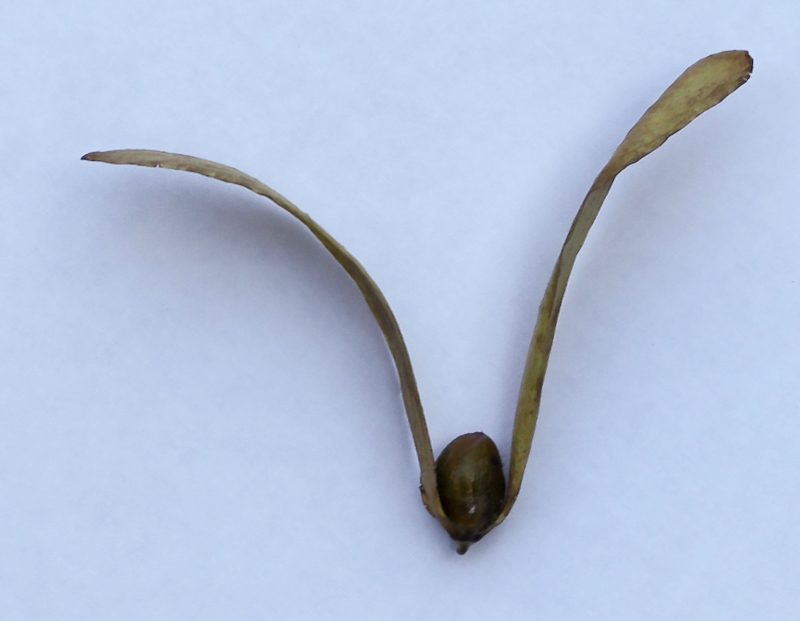
Seed

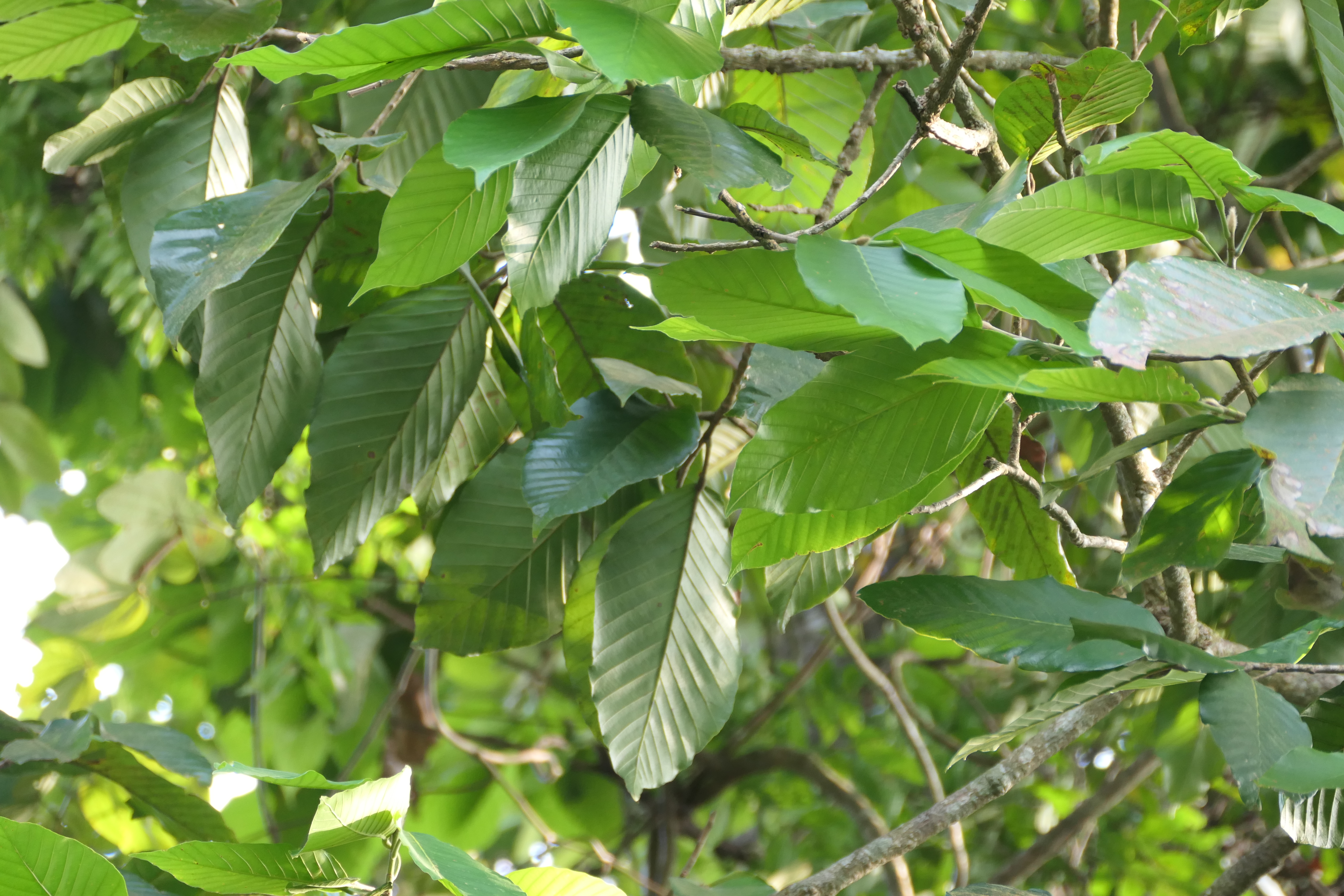
Leaves
