= International 14 =

Sailboat class

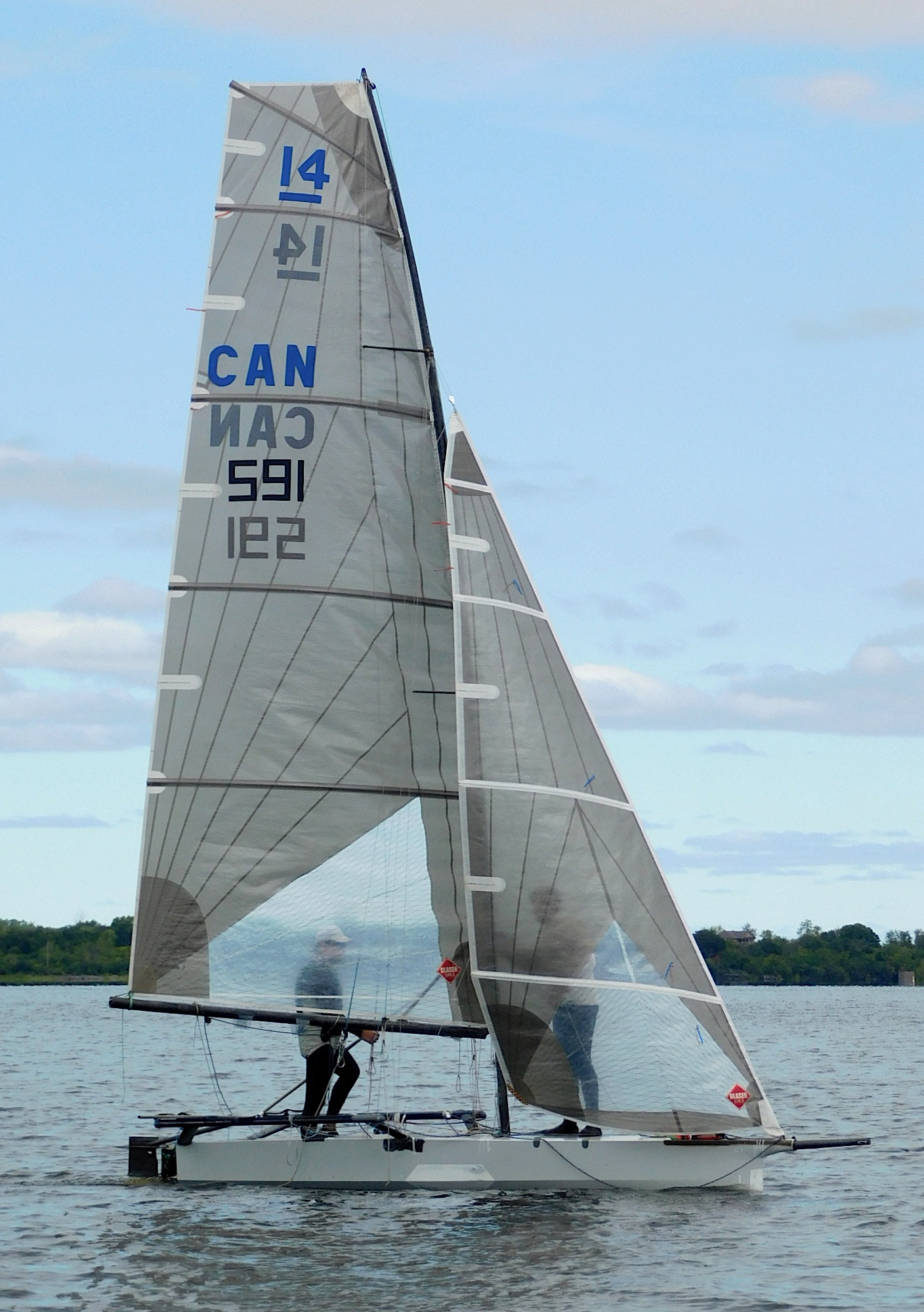

Development
- Designer: Many designers
- Location: United Kingdom
- Year: 1928
- Builders: China New Yachts; Composite Craft; Henderson Boat Company; Ovington Boats; W. D. Schock Corp
- Role: racing sailing dinghy

Boat
- Crew: two
- Displacement: {70 kg}

Hull
- Type: monohull
- Construction: any material permitted
- LOA: 14.00 ft (4.27 m)
- LWL: 14.00 ft (4.27 m)
- Beam: 6.00 ft (1.83 m)

Hull appendages
- Keel: daggarboard
- Rudder: transom-mounted rudder

Rig
- Rig type: Bermuda rig

Sails
- Sailplan: fractional rigged sloop
- Total sail area: 200.00 sq ft (18.581 m^{2})

Racing
- RYA PN: 780

The International 14 is a International racing sailboat, crewed by two sailors. The class was established in 1928.

The boat is a developmental sailing class and so the design rules and the boats themselves have changed dramatically over time to keep the International 14 at the leading edge of sailing technology. Many designers have contributed to the boat.

Sailboatdata.com noted "the International 14 is a high performance 2-Man, development racing dinghy with a long history of performance developments that often been adopted in the design of later boats. Today, with hiking racks, a giant flat head main, and its 'skiff' like hull, an up-to-date racing model bears little resemblance to the earlier boats."

The design became an international World Sailing class in 1928.

== Production ==
The design has been built by many builders over a century of construction. Today it is built by Ovington Boats and Composite Craft in the United Kingdom. From 1946 to 1970 it was built in the United States by the W. D. Schock Corp, with 26 boats completed over that 24-year period. It was also at one time built by the Henderson Boat Company in North America and China New Yachts in China.

== Design ==
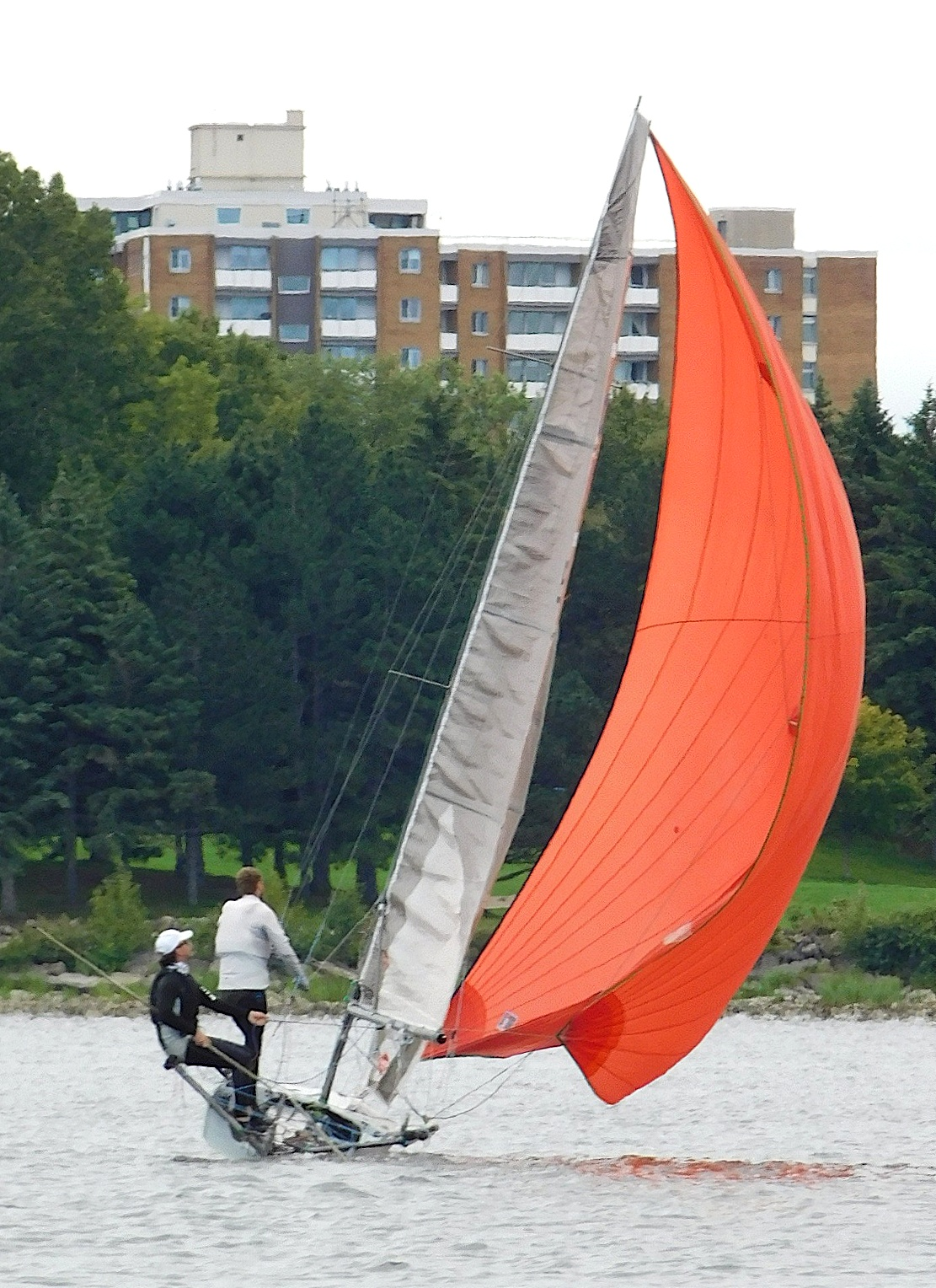
An International 14 flying its asymmetrical spinnaker

Before the class was formally established in 1928, many designers built open class 14 foot racing boats that were the forerunners of the official class. In 1923 Uffa Fox built his first 14-foot racer and by 1925 was creating designs for them. Fox introduced the first planing hull-equipped 14, named Avenger, in 1927.

The International 14 is a racing sailing dinghy. Over time the hulls have mostly been built from wood, glassfibre and more recently, carbon fibre reinforced polymer, although under class rules any materials are permitted for the hull. Modern boats built to the current rules, for example to the Bieker 6 design, typically have a fractional sloop rig with carbon fibre spars; a plumb stem and transom; a transom-hung, hydrofoil-equipped rudder controlled by a tiller with an extension and a retractable centreboard. Hiking racks are also fitted, along with fully-battened mainsails. Carbon fibre boats typically weigh 154 lb (70 kg).

The class was one of the first to allow a trapeze, adopted in 1938. A second trapeze was permitted starting in 1984, due to the large amount of sail carried on boats of that period. In 1996 the International version and the Australian models were merged into a single class.

For sailing downwind the design may be equipped with an asymmetrical spinnaker, flown from a long carbon fibre bowsprit. The spinnaker size is unrestricted, but 344.45 sq ft (32.000 m^{2}) is typical.

The boat has a Royal Yachting Association Portsmouth Yardstick handicap of 780.

== Operational history ==
The design is supported by an active class club that organizes racing events, the International 14 Class Association. There are 14 active fleets sailing in Australia, Canada, France, Germany, Japan, the UK and the US.

== Boats on display ==
- National Maritime Museum Cornwall, Falmouth, Cornwall, England

== See also ==
- List of sailing boat types
