= List of Australian sail racing associations =

The following is a list of former and current Australian sailboat racing associations. Current associations are affiliated with and recognised by Australian Sailing (AS) unless noted otherwise.

Association	Classes raced	Years active	Notes
Adams 10 Metre Yacht Association	Adams 10 Metre	1988–present	
Australian 16 ft Skiff Association	16ft Skiff		
Australian 2.4 Metre Class Association	2.4 Metre		
Australian 420 Association	420		
Australian 9er Association			
Australian Arrow & Arafura Catamaran Association			
Australian Blokart Association Inc			
Australian Formula 18 Catamaran Association	Formula 18		
Australian FQ32 Class Association			
Australian Hansa Class Association			
Australian Historical Sailing Skiff Association	Historical skiffs	1990–present	Formed to race restored and replica historical skiffs
Australian International Dragon Association			
Australian International A Division Catamaran Association			
Australian International Optimist Dinghy Association	Optimist		
Australian International Yngling Association	Yngling		
Australian Impulse Association	Impulse		
Australian Laser Class Association	Laser		
Australian Minnow Class Association			
Australian Musto Skiff Class	Musto Skiff		
Australian National Sabot Council	Sabot		
Australian O'pen Skiff Association	O'pen Skiff		
Australian Paper Tiger Catamaran Association	Paper Tiger		
Australian Radio Yachting Association			
Australian Sharpie Sailing Association	Lightweight Sharpie	1962–present	Lightweight sharpies are an Australian version of the 12 m2 Sharpie.
Australian Sports Boat Association	Various	2007–present	The ASBA supports and promotes Sportsboat racing
Australian Tasar Council	Tasar		
Australian Weta Class Association \	Weta		
Australian Windsurfing Association			
Cherub Association of Australia	Cherub		Not affiliated with AS
Couta Boat Association	Couta		Couta boats are a traditional fishing boat developed for Port Phillip Bay and are raced in Melbourne.
Cruising Yacht Association, Northern Territory			
Farr 40 Owners Group	Farr 40		
Flying Eleven Association of Australia	Flying Eleven		
Flying Fifteen International	Flying Fifteen		
Hartley TS16 Association of Australia	Hartley TS 16		
International 470 Class Association of Australia	470		
International 5.5 Metre Association of Australia	5.5 Metre		
International 505 Yacht Racing Association of Australia	505		
International B14 Association of Australia	B14		
International Cadet Class Association	cadet		
International Contender Association of Australia	Contender		
International Etchells Class Association of Australia	Etchells		
International Finn Association of Australia Inc.	Finn		
International Fireball Association of Australia	Fireball		
International Flying Dutchman Class of Australia	Flying Dutchman		
International Fourteen Sailing Council of Australia			
International Mirror Class Association of Australia	Mirror		
International Moth Class Association of Australia	Moth		
International OK Association of Australia	OK		
J70 Class of Australia	J/70		
Kiteboarding Australia			
MG14 Association of NSW	MG14		
Nacra Association of Australia	Various Nacra Sailing designs		
National 125 Association of Australia	125		
National E Sailing Association	National E	1965–present	Not affiliated with AS
National Heron Sailing Association	Heron		
National Mosquito Catamaran Council of Australia	Mosquito		
NS14 Association of Australia	NS14		
NSW 12 Foot Skiff Association	12ft Skiff		
Pacer Australia	Pacer		
Pelican Sailing Association	Pelican		
Old Gaffers Association of WA	Various		
RL24 Owners Association of Australia	RL 24		
RS Aero Class Association (Aust)	RS Aero		
RS Sailing Association Australia	Various		
Sabre Sailing Association of Australia	Sabre		
SB20 Australia			
Skate Sailing Association of WA	Skate		
Spiral Class Association of Australia	Spiral		
The Classic Yacht Association of Australia	Various		
Trailer Sailer Association of South Australia	Various		
VX One Australia	VX One		
Waszp Sailing Association Of Australia	Waszp		
