= MG14 =

Two-person skiff

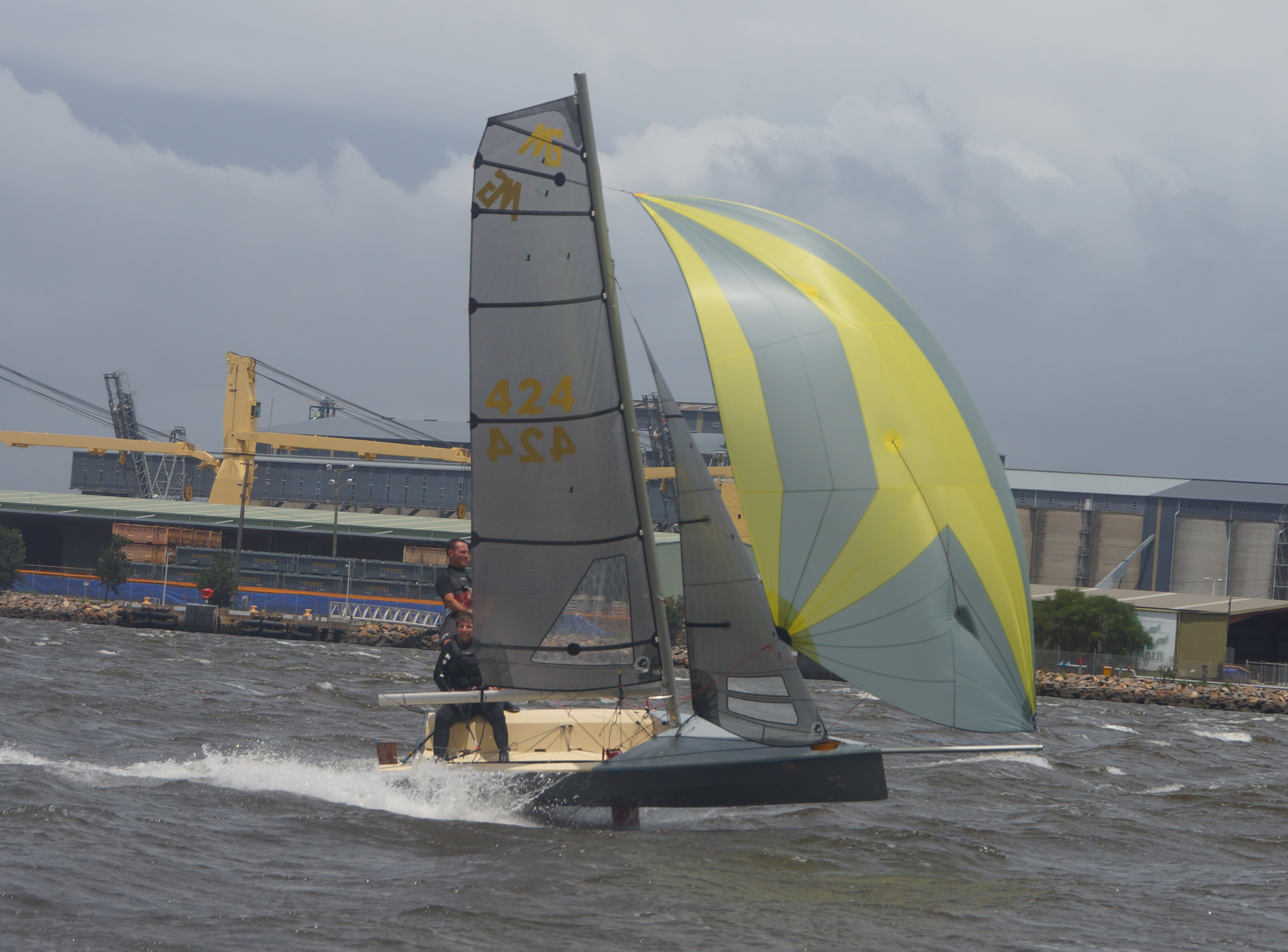
MG14 sailing downwind in heavy breeze

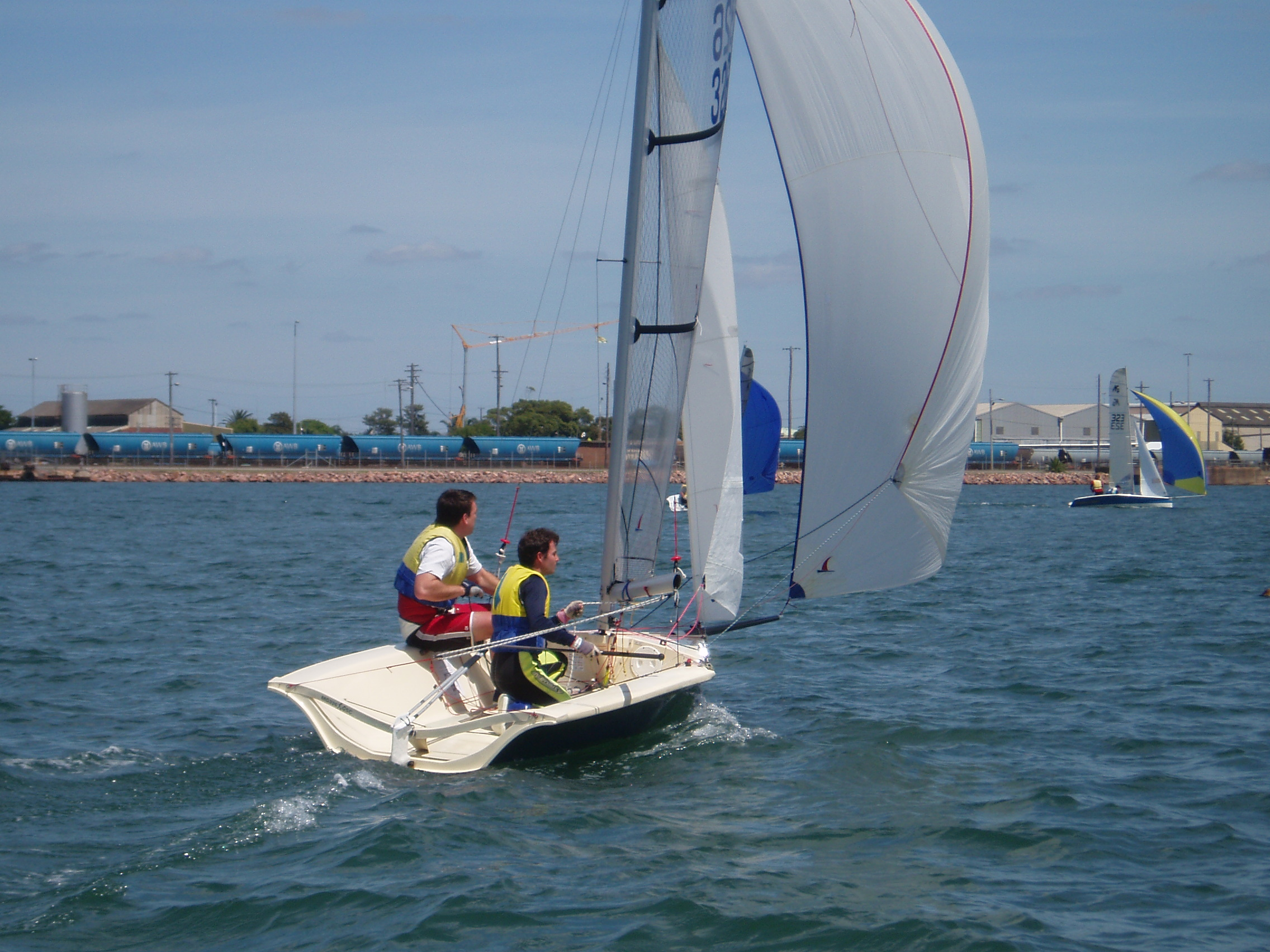
MG14 sailing downwind in light breeze

MG14 is a two-person skiff with a high-performance development hull, single trapeze and asymmetrical spinnaker.

It was originally developed in 1963 at Manly Sailing Club in Sydney as the Manly Graduate 14ft to be used as a stepping stone between the smaller Manly Junior and larger boats such as the 16ft Skiff. During its early history it had a double luff spinnaker, but is now rigged with an asymmetric spinnaker - giving great performance, ease of use and tactical gybing downwind.

The MG14 is now a high performance machine, with performance to rival any other single trapeze boat of its size. Keeping the modest sail area, however, has ensured entry level skiff sailors, and older sailors, can still compete and race. It is a performance boat that places emphasis on technique, finesse and strategy - rather than brute force!

The class has various hull designs of similar performance, but with variances in stability or speed on certain wind angles and strength. The class has a tight set of rules so the boats can modernise but the older ones still remain competitive for many years. Because of this MG14s have good resale value.

It is a popular class with fleets in New South Wales, Queensland, Victoria and in the Australian Capital Territory.

The NS14 class is very similar to the MG14 - it has the same hull and working rig designs but that class does not allow spinnakers or trapezes. The NS14 and MG14 share the same restricted development rules about hull and working sail measurements. Several boats are registered to sail as both MG14 and NS14s.

== Main class specifications ==
- Length: 4.25 - 4.30m (14ft)
- Beam: 1.60 - 1.83m (6ft).
- Minimum Hull Weight: 64 kg.
- Working Sail Area: 9.3 sq m (mainsail and jib)
- Asymmetric Spinnaker: 14m perimeter.
- Crew: Two.
- Trapezes: One.
