= MYC (disambiguation) =

MYC or Myc may refer to:

- MYC, a protein-coding gene in the species Homo sapiens
- Myc, a family of regulator genes
- myc, the ISO 639-3 code for Ngbinda language

== Organizations and events ==
- Mobile Yacht Club, a private boat club and harbor
- Manly Yacht Club, a sailing club in the suburb of Manly on the Northern Beaches of Sydney
- Milwaukee Yacht Club, a yacht club established in Wisconsin
- Madras Youth Choir, a non-profit, voluntary organization in Chennai, Tamil Nadu
- Mae Young Classic (2018), a multi-night special event and tournament
