= Black Rock Yacht Club =

Yacht club in Melbourne, Victoria, Australia

Coordinates: 37.9695°S 145.0103°E

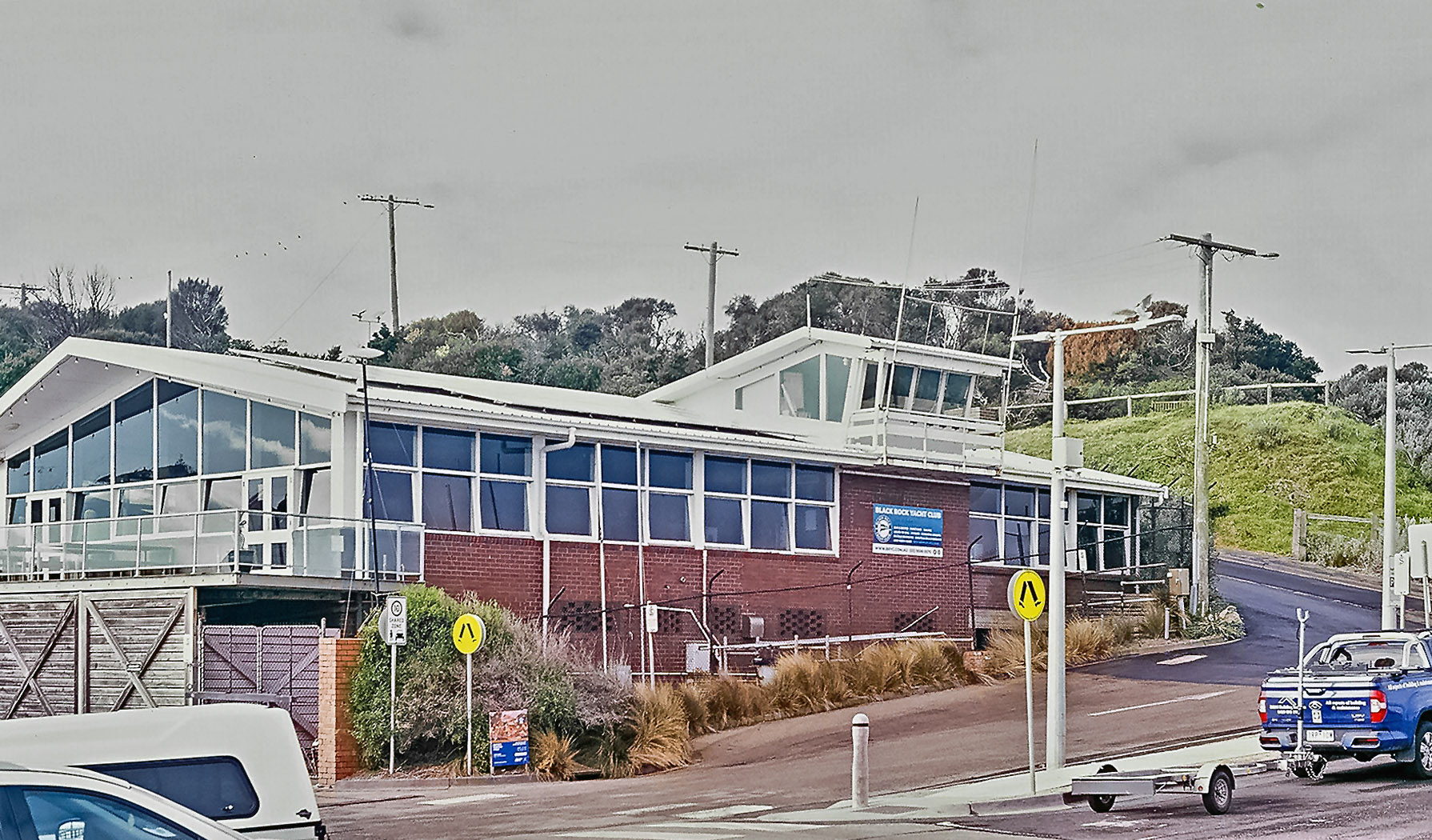
- The yacht club, 2024

- Burgee
- Founded: 1904; 122 years ago
- Location: Black Rock, Port Phillip Bay, Melbourne, Victoria, Australia
- Commodore: Nik Wallis
- Focus: Dinghies
- Website: bryc.com.au

The Black Rock Yacht Club is a yacht club for off-the-beach sailing boats located at Black Rock on the shores of Port Phillip Bay, in the south-eastern suburbs of Melbourne, Victoria, Australia.

== History ==
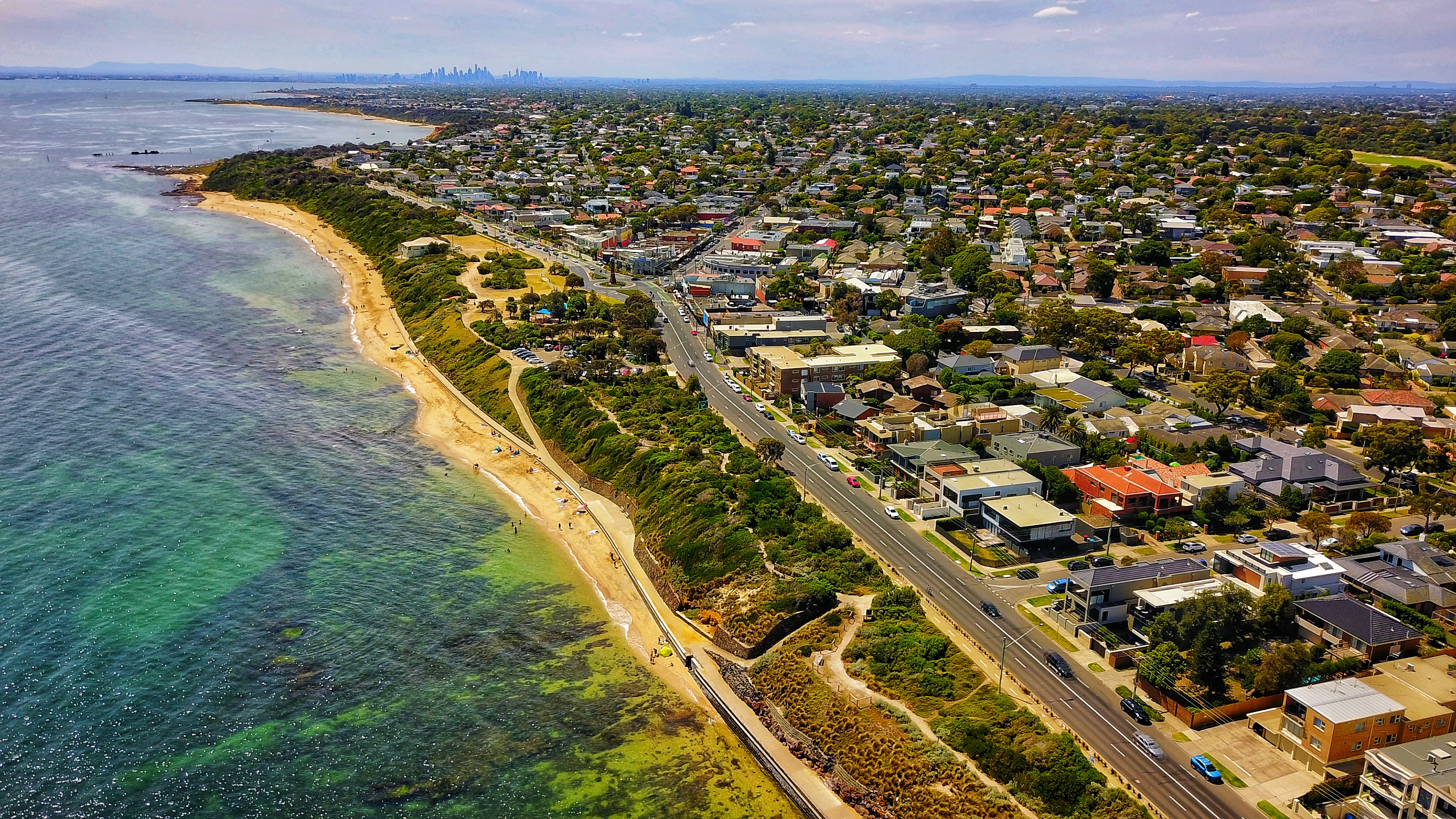
Aerial perspective of the yacht club to Port Philip Bay and the Melbourne city centre, 2019. The yacht club is on the little headland left of the image

The club was founded in 1904, mostly accommodates dinghies, and has a history of nurturing Olympic, world and Australian champions. Classes sailed at the club include International 14, OK, Sabre, 125, 420, Moth, Sabot, Optimist, RS Aero, and Australian Lightweight Sharpie.

In 1926 the nineteenth century warship HMVS Cerberus was scuttled to form a breakwater in front of the club and as a result launching is quite easy in most wind conditions.

The Black Rock Yacht Club hosts many national and international regattas such as the Moth World Championship (2004–05), the 470 World Championships in 1999, the Finn Gold Cup (world champs) twice, and the RS Aero Worlds (2019–20). The fleet of International 14s sailing out of Black Rock is particularly strong.

== Notable members ==
- Lindsay Irwin, the 2005 International 14 World Champion

== See also ==
- Ocean Racing Club of Victoria
