= RS Aero European Championships =

International sailing regatta

- Most recent edition or competition: 2025 RS Aero European Championship
- First held: 2016
- Class: RS Aero

The RS Aero European Championship is an annual international sailing regatta for the RS Aero class. The event is organized by the host club on behalf of the RS Aero Class Association.

== Hosts ==
| Edition | | | Hosts | | | Ref. |
| No | Day/Month | Year | Host club | City | Country | Ref. |
|---|---|---|---|---|---|---|
| 1 | 25 – 29 Jul | 2016 | Travemünde Week | Travemünde | Germany | |
| 2 | 17 – 23 Aug | 2019 | Fraglia Vela Malcesine | Malcesine | Italy | |
| ~~3~~ | Cancelled due to COVID-19 pandemic | 2020 | Fraglia Vela Malcesine | Malcesine | Italy | |
| 3 | 31 Jul – 6 Aug | 2021 | Fraglia Vela Malcesine | Malcesine | Italy | |
| 4 | 30 Jul – 5 Aug | 2022 | Weymouth and Portland National Sailing Academy | Isle of Portland | United Kingdom | |
| 5 | 21 – 24 Jun | 2024 | Carnac Yacht Club | Carnac | France | |
| 6 | 24 – 27 Apr | 2025 | Circolo Vela Torbole | Torbole | Italy | |
| 7 | 29 – 24 Jul | 2026 | Travemünde Week | Travemünde | Germany | |
| 8 | 27 – 30 Aug | 2027 | Howth Yacht Club | Dublin | Ireland | |

== Results ==
=== RS Aero 5 ===
==== Male ====
| Year | Gold | Silver | Bronze |
|---|---|---|---|
| 2016 | Archie Hainsworth (GBR) | Andrias Sillaste (EST) | |
| 2019 | Attila Banyai (HUN) | Andrew Frost (GBR) | Sammy Isaacs-Johnson (GBR) |
| 2021 | Attila Banyai (HUN) | Roy Van Maanen (IRE) | Axel Almersson (SWE) |
| 2022 | Roscoe Martin (GBR) | Tom Ahlheid (GBR) | Andrew Frost (GBR) |
| 2024 | Enrico Loi (ITA) | Mattia Monti (ITA) | Andrea Manconi (ITA) |
| 2025 | Sammy Isaacs-Johnson (GBR) | Andrias Sillaste (EST) | Enrico Loi (ITA) |

==== Female ====
| Year | Gold | Silver | Bronze |
|---|---|---|---|
| 2016 | Lucy Greenwood (GBR) | Silvia Johanna Haavel (EST) | |
| 2019 | Liina Kolk (EST) | Caitlin Atkin (GBR) | Lily Barrett (GBR) |
| 2021 | Francesca Ramazzotti (ITA) | Vanja Ramm-Ericson (SWE) | Anouck de Ripainsel (BEL) |
| 2022 | Chloe George (GBR) | Abby Hire (GBR) | Alessandra Tydeman (GBR) |
| 2024 | Florence Le Brun (FRA) | Vittoria Cartelli (ITA) | Anka Staite (GBR) |
| 2025 | Jessica Jöesaar (EST) | Sophie Stockton (GBR) | Nathalie Jacob (FRA) |

=== RS Aero 6 ===
==== Male ====
| Year | Gold | Silver | Bronze |
|---|---|---|---|
| 2022 | Chris Hatton (GBR) | Ants Haavel (EST) | Chris Rust (GBR) |
| 2024 | Andrew Frost (GBR) | Dan Venables (GBR) | Chris Hatton (GBR) |
| 2025 | Andrew Frost (GBR) | Filippo Vincis (ITA) | Kristo Ounap (EST) |

==== Female ====
| Year | Gold | Silver | Bronze |
|---|---|---|---|
| 2022 | Abigail Larr (GBR) | Cathy Lunn (GBR) | Beth Milledge (GBR) |
| 2024 | Sofiia Naumenko (UKR) | Ellie Craig (GBR) | Liina Kolk (EST) |
| 2025 | Sofiia Naumenko (UKR) | Liina Kolk (EST) | Juliane Barthel (GER) |

=== RS Aero 7 ===
==== Male ====
| Year | Gold | Silver | Bronze |
|---|---|---|---|
| 2016 | Dmitry Tretyakov (RUS) | Kristo Ounap (EST) | Simonas Jersovas (LTU) |
| 2019 | Peter Barton (GBR) | Craig Williamson (GBR) | Jack Hopkins (GBR) |
| 2021 | Peter Barton (GBR) | Leopoldo Sirolli (ITA) | Giulio Sirolli (ITA) |
| 2022 | Martis Pajarskas (LTU) | Tim Hire (GBR) | Vejas Strelciunas (LTU) |
| 2024 | Pim Van Vugt (NED) | Noah Rees (GBR) | Jack Miler (GBR) |
| 2025 | Mattia Di Lorenzo (ITA) | Peter Barton (GBR) | Mark Ripley (GBR) |

==== Female ====
| Year | Gold | Silver | Bronze |
|---|---|---|---|
| 2016 | Liina Kolk (EST) | Juliane Barthel (GER) | Jane Peckham (GBR) |
| 2019 | Juliane Barthel (GER) | Eleanor Craig (GBR) | Jane Peckham (GBR) |
| 2021 | Julie Lamarre (SWE) | | |
| 2022 | Anya Haji-Michael (GBR) | | |
| 2024 | Juliane Barthel (GER) | Paula Boyle (GBR) | Julie Lamarre (SWE) |

=== RS Aero 9 ===
| Year | Gold | Silver | Bronze |
|---|---|---|---|
| 2016 | Richard Watsham (GBR) | Ben Rolfe (GBR) | Matt Thursfield (GBR) |
| 2019 | Greg Bartlett (GBR) | Liam Willis (GBR) | Chris Larr (GBR) |
| 2022 | Peter Barton (GBR) | Chris Larr (GBR) | Ben Charnley (GBR) |
| 2024 | Ben Flower (GBR) | Peter Barton (GBR) | Eric Wahlberg (SWE) |
| 2025 | Ben Flower (GBR) | Rory Cohen (GBR) | Timothy Woodcock (FRA) |

== See also ==
- RS Aero
- RS Aero World Championships
