= Flying Eleven =

Australian high-performance racing skiff

Boat
- Crew: 2

Hull
- Hull weight: 39 kg (86 lb)
- LOA: 3.3 m (11 ft)
- Beam: 1.33 m (4 ft 4 in)

Sails
- Mainsail area: 6.04 m^{2} (65.0 sq ft)
- Jib/genoa area: 2.51 m^{2} (27.0 sq ft)
- Spinnaker area: 4.46 m^{2} (48.0 sq ft)

The Flying Eleven is an Australian boat designed as a high-performance racing skiff suitable for 12- to 18-year-olds.

High performance sailing has become more prominent for dinghy sailors with the appearance of 49ers as an Olympic class. The Flying Eleven is considered a "stepping stone" in the transition between junior classes such as the Manly Junior or Sabot and prepares young sailors for higher classes.

In 2006, the Winning Appliances National Championships featuring flying elevens was expected to bring 90 entrants to Lake Macquarie. In 2019, the national flying eleven regatta hosted by Port Stephens Sailing and Aquatic Club was expected to attract 42 boats.
