= Historical 10 foot skiffs =

Type of racing boat

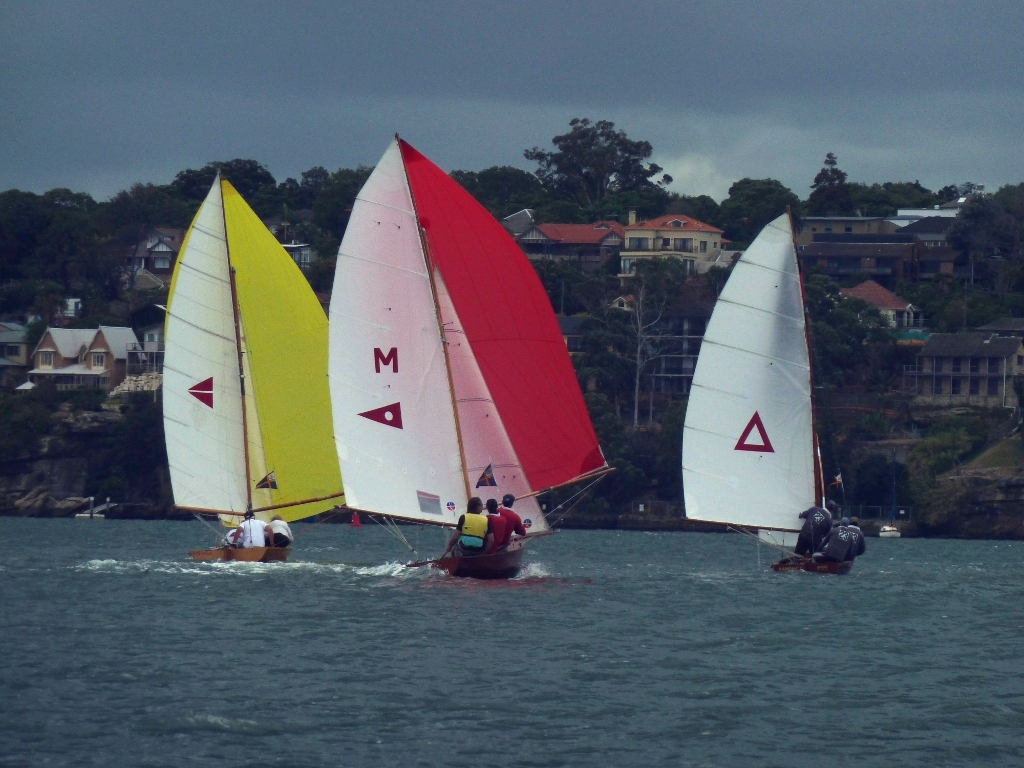
3 skiffs

Historical 10 Foot Skiffs are sailing skiffs raced by members of the Australian Historical Sailing Skiff Association at Drummoyne Sailing Club on the Parramatta River in Sydney and at the Brisbane 18 Footers Sailing Club on the Brisbane River in Bulimba, Brisbane. Racing is held under the auspices of the AHSSA. The 10 footers are beautiful boats with a strong sense of camaraderie among the crews, who are reliving the sailing events of the past.

== Crew ==
The 10 foot skiff is crewed by crews of 3 who attempt to keep these craft under control below large amounts of sail area. The only exception to this is the skiff Commonwealth II which requires between 4 and 5 crew depending on rig selected.

== Racing ==
In Sydney, these boats race once a month on a Sunday, starting at 13.30. The races typically last just over two hours and attracks spectators to the rigging area to view the wooden vessels. The large size of the sail area, assembled across three rigs, is frequently noted by observers. Although these boats require precise handling, they provide insight into historical sailing methods.

== Boats ==
Currently the oldest boat in the fleet is the Commonwealth II, built in 1997, is an exact replica of the Commonwealth which was built in 1907. This boat still sails and has had many memorable moments including a win on Handicap at the National Titles in 2006 when crewed by 4 sailors from Lake Macquarie. The Commonwealth II continues to sail in National Titles.

The oldest boat sailing regularly is the Dove, based on an old Queensland 12 foot skiff called Dove, she is one of the smaller 10s both in hull and rig. She has proved to be a very good handicap boat and recently won the NSW Handicap State Title in March, 2011.

The majority of the other boats are reproductions of hulls designed and built by Len Heffernan in the early 1950s and carry a mix of sails from 18s and 16 foot skiffs.

== Dates and venues ==
The sailing dates for the 10 footers at Drummoyne Sailing Club may be found at the 10 footer website.

The NSW 10 footers venture up to Lake Macquarie on the last Sunday in November each year and the first weekend in February where they hold the first two heats of the NSW State titles, before venturing back to Drummoyne Sailing Club for the last two heats.

The National Titles alternate between the Brisbane River, at the Brisbane Sailing Squadron, Lake Macquarie and sometimes the Drummoyne Sailing Club, on the Parramatta River.
