= Australian Sailing =

Governing body for sailing in Australia

- Sport: Sailing
- Jurisdiction: Australia
- Abbreviation: AS
- Founded: 1956
- Affiliation: World Sailing
- Affiliation date: 1967
- Regional affiliation: OSAF
- Headquarters: North Sydney, New South Wales
- President: Shevaun Bruland
- CEO: Ben Houston

Official website
- www.sailing.org.au
- (Australia)

Australian Sailing is the national governing body for the sport of sailing in Australia, recognised by World Sailing as the country's official member national authority.

Founded in 1950 as the Australian Yachting Federation at the Royal St Kilda Yacht Club, it represents over 360 affiliated clubs and 160 accredited Discover Sailing Centres nationwide. Australian Sailing is responsible for the administration, promotion, and development of sailing, including participation programs, coaching and instructor training, youth and high-performance pathways, and the management of the Australian Sailing Team for international competition.

In 2017, it partnered with the Australian National Maritime Museum to launch the Australian Sailing Hall of Fame.

== Purpose ==
Australian Sailing's purpose is to grow sailing by leading, inspiring, and supporting sailors and their communities.

== Clubs ==
Notable yacht clubs affiliated with Australian Sailing include the Cruising Yacht Club of Australia, Royal Perth Yacht Club, Royal Brighton Yacht Club, Royal Queensland Yacht Squadron, Royal Sydney Yacht Squadron, Royal Yacht Club of Victoria, Royal Freshwater Bay Yacht Club, Royal Geelong Yacht Club, Royal Prince Alfred Yacht Club and the Royal Yacht Club of Tasmania.

== Affiliated classes ==
Australian Sailing affiliates member associations including class associations for dinghies, keelboats, windsurfers, kite surfing and remote control boats.

== Hall of Fame ==
In 2017, Australian Sailing Hall of Fame was established in conjunction with the Australian National Maritime Museum.

== See also ==
- List of Australian sail racing associations
- Category:Australian sailors
- Category:Olympic sailors for Australia
- Category:Australian sailors (sport)
- Category:World champions in sailing for Australia
