= Sofiia Naumenko =

Ukrainian sailor

Personal information
- Nationality: Ukrainian

Sailing career
- Sport: Sailing
- Classes: RS Aero, Laser Radial
Medal record
Representing Ukraine
Sailing
RS Aero World Championships
Gold medal – first place	2023 Douarnenez	Women's RS Aero
Gold medal – first place	2024 Hayling Island	Women's RS Aero
Gold medal – first place	2025 Quiberon	Women's RS Aero
RS Aero European Championships
Gold medal – first place	2024 Carnac	Women's RS Aero
Gold medal – first place	2025 Torbole	Women's RS Aero

Sofiia Naumenko also written as Sophia Naumenko is a Ukrainian sailor who is three time female RS Aero 6 World Champion, having won the overall title in 2024 and 2025 and the female one in 2023. She has also won two European Championships in the RS Aero, in 2024 and 2025.
