= RS Aero World Championships =

International sailing regatta

- Most recent edition or competition: 2025 RS Aero World Championship
- First held: 2017
- Class: RS Aero

The RS Aero World Championships and the RS Aero Junior World Championships are an international sailing regatta for RS Aero dinghy, organised by the host club on behalf of the RS Aero Class Association and recognised by World Sailing. The class gained World Sailing recognition in November of 2015.

== Editions of Open Worlds ==
Ed.			Hosts			Rig	Sailor					Ref.
No	Day/Month	Year	Host club	City	Country	Rig	No.			Nat.	Cont.	Ref.
1	24 – 28 Jul	2017	Yacht Club de Carnac	Carnac	France	5	22	13	9	8	3	
1	24 – 28 Jul	2017	Yacht Club de Carnac	Carnac	France	7	62	53	8	13	4	
1	24 – 28 Jul	2017	Yacht Club de Carnac	Carnac	France	9	21	21	0	9	4	
2	4 – 10 Aug	2018	Weymouth and Portland National Sailing Academy	Weymouth	United Kingdom	5	61	32	29	8	2	
2	4 – 10 Aug	2018	Weymouth and Portland National Sailing Academy	Weymouth	United Kingdom	7	104	97	7	11	4	
2	4 – 10 Aug	2018	Weymouth and Portland National Sailing Academy	Weymouth	United Kingdom	9	43	43	0	8	3	
3	28 Dec 2019 – 4 Jan 2020	2019	Black Rock Yacht Club	Melbourne	Australia	5	29	14	15	4	3	
3	28 Dec 2019 – 4 Jan 2020	2019	Black Rock Yacht Club	Melbourne	Australia	7	38	37	1	4	3	
3	28 Dec 2019 – 4 Jan 2020	2019	Black Rock Yacht Club	Melbourne	Australia	9	9	9	0	3	3	
N/A	-	2020	Columbia Gorge Racing Association	Cascade Locks, Oregon	United States	Postponed due to COVID-19 pandemic						
N/A	-	2021	Columbia Gorge Racing Association	Cascade Locks, Oregon	United States	Cancelled due to COVID-19 pandemic						
4	24 June – 1 July	2022	Columbia Gorge Racing Association	Cascade Locks, Oregon	United States	5	13	9	4	4	4	
4	24 June – 1 July	2022	Columbia Gorge Racing Association	Cascade Locks, Oregon	United States	7	35	35	0	6	4	
4	24 June – 1 July	2022	Columbia Gorge Racing Association	Cascade Locks, Oregon	United States	9	6	6	0	1	1	
5	26 – 30 July	2023	Lega Navale del Sulcis	Calasetta	Italy	5	36	20	15	9	4	
5	26 – 30 July	2023	Lega Navale del Sulcis	Calasetta	Italy	6	42	29	13	12	4	
5	26 – 30 July	2023	Lega Navale del Sulcis	Calasetta	Italy	7	46	44	2	13	4	
5	26 – 30 July	2023	Lega Navale del Sulcis	Calasetta	Italy	9	12	12	0	5	3	
6	26 – 30 Aug	2024	Hayling Island Sailing Club	Hayling Island	United Kingdom	5	50	21	29	7	3	
6	26 – 30 Aug	2024	Hayling Island Sailing Club	Hayling Island	United Kingdom	6	40	29	10	5	2	
6	26 – 30 Aug	2024	Hayling Island Sailing Club	Hayling Island	United Kingdom	7	64	63	1	7	2	
6	26 – 30 Aug	2024	Hayling Island Sailing Club	Hayling Island	United Kingdom	9	19	19	0	8	2	
7	28 Jul – 2 Aug	2025	National Sailing and Watersports School	Quiberon	France	5	62	33	29	12	4	
7	28 Jul – 2 Aug	2025	National Sailing and Watersports School	Quiberon	France	6	50	39	11	11	3	
7	28 Jul – 2 Aug	2025	National Sailing and Watersports School	Quiberon	France	7	40	38	2	10	3	
7	28 Jul – 2 Aug	2025	National Sailing and Watersports School	Quiberon	France	9	15	15	0	7	3	
8	16 – 22 Jan	2027	Blairgowrie Yacht Squadron	Melbourne	Australia	5						
8	16 – 22 Jan	2027	Blairgowrie Yacht Squadron	Melbourne	Australia	6						
8	16 – 22 Jan	2027	Blairgowrie Yacht Squadron	Melbourne	Australia	7						
8	16 – 22 Jan	2027	Blairgowrie Yacht Squadron	Melbourne	Australia	9						

== Editions of Junior Worlds ==
Ed.			Hosts			Rig	Sailor					Ref.
No	Day/Month	Year	Host club	City	Country	Rig	No.			Nat.	Cont.	Ref.
N/A	-	2021			Germany	Cancelled due to COVID-19 pandemic						
1	-	2022	Weymouth and Portland National Sailing Academy	Weymouth	United Kingdom	J5	52	34	18	10	3	
1	-	2022	Weymouth and Portland National Sailing Academy	Weymouth	United Kingdom	J7	20	17	3	7	1	
2	-	2024	Marstrands Segelsallskap	Marstrands	Sweden	J5	39	29	10	5	1	
2	-	2024	Marstrands Segelsallskap	Marstrands	Sweden	J6	9	6	3	4	1	
2	-	2024	Marstrands Segelsallskap	Marstrands	Sweden	J7	12	12	0	4	2	
N/A	July	2026	Part of Travemunde Woche / 2026 RS Games	Travemunde	Germany	J5	Sub Event within Open Europeans					
N/A	July	2026	Part of Travemunde Woche / 2026 RS Games	Travemunde	Germany	J6	Sub Event within Open Europeans					
N/A	July	2026	Part of Travemunde Woche / 2026 RS Games	Travemunde	Germany	J7	Sub Event within Open Europeans					
N/A	July	2026	Part of Travemunde Woche / 2026 RS Games	Travemunde	Germany	J9	Sub Event within Open Europeans					

== Results ==
Location	Rig / Boats	Gold	Silver	Bronze	1st Female	Ref.
2017	5 / 22	Andrew Frost (GBR)	Sander Puppart (EST)	Andrias Sillaste (EST)	4th Kate Sargent (GBR)	
2017	7 / 61	Stephen Cockerill (GBR)	Peter Barton (GBR)	Paul Bartlett (GBR)	18th Liina Kolk (EST)	
2017	9 / 21	Marc Jacobi (USA)	Liam Willis (GBR)	Greg Bartlett (GBR)	None	
2018	5 / 61	Ben Hutton-Penman (GBR)	Liina Kolk (EST)	Andrew Frost (GBR)	2nd Liina Kolk (EST)	
2018	7 / 104	Sam Whaley (GBR)	Jack Hopkins (GBR)	Stephen Cockerill (GBR)	14th Juliane Barthel (GER)	
2018	9 / 43	Marc Jacobi (USA)	Peter Barton (GBR)	George Cousins (GBR)	None	
2019	5 / 29	Sophie Jackson (AUS)	David Ellis (GBR)	Megan Ridgway (AUS)	1st Sophie Jackson (AUS)	
2019	7 / 38	Rhett Gowans (AUS)	Marc Jacobi (USA)	Noah Rees (GBR)	30th Fleur Scrivens (AUS)	
2019	9 / 9	Liam Willis (GBR)	Derek Bottles (USA)	Keith Willis (GBR)	None	
2020	Cancelled due to COVID					
2021	Cancelled due to COVID					
2022	5 / 13	Dieter Creitz (USA)	Ryan Zehnder (USA)	Yannick Gloster (USA)	4th Caroline Young (USA)	
2022	7 / 36	Dalton Bergan (USA)	Jay Renehan (USA)	Peter Barton (GBR)	None	
2022	9 / 6	Dan Falk (USA)	Keith Hammer (USA)	Michael Johnson (USA)	None	
2023	5 / 35	Chloe George (GBR)	Elliot Hellstrom (SWE)	Andrias Sillaste (EST)	1st Chloe George (GBR)	
2023	6 / 42	Rhett Gowans (AUS)	Dieter CREITZ (USA)	Sofiia Naumenko (UKR)	3rd Sofiia Naumenko (UKR)	
2023	7 / 46	Peter Barton (GBR)	Jack Miller (GBR)	Noah Rees (GBR)	19th Juliane Barthel (GER)	
2023	9 / 12	Dan Falk (USA)	Madhavan Thirumalai (USA)	Keith Hammer (USA)	None	
2024	5 / 50	Georgia Booth (GBR)	Jonathan Bailey (GBR)	Roscoe Martin (GBR)	1st Georgia Booth (GBR)	
2024	6 / 39	Sofiia Naumenko (UKR)	Andrew Frost (GBR)	Dan Venables (GBR)	1st Sofiia Naumenko (UKR)	
2024	7 / 64	Finley Dickinson (GBR)	Arthur Farley (GBR)	Tim Hire (GBR)	18th Eleanor Craig (GBR)	
2024	9 / 19	Ben Flower (CAN)	Peter Barton (GBR)	Erik Wahlberg (SWE)	None	
2025	5 / 62	Raphael Olsthoorn (FRA)	Roscoe Martin (GBR)	Chloe George (GBR)	3rd Chloe George (GBR)	
2025	6 / 50	Sofiia Naumenko (UKR)	Sam Blaker (GBR)	Andrew Frost (GBR)	1st Sofiia Naumenko (UKR)	
2025	7 / 40	Peter Barton (GBR)	Jack Miller (GBR)	Mark Ripley (GBR)	32nd / Paula Boyle (GBR)	
2025	9 / 15	Baabii O Flower (CAN)	Nick Craig (GBR)	Madhavan Thirumalai (USA)	None	

== Youth World Championships ==
Location	Rig / Boats	Gold	Silver	Bronze	Ref.
2022	5 / 52	Jonathan Bailey (GBR)	Tom Ahlheid (GBR)	Sam Blaker (GBR)	
2022	7 / 20	Vejas Strelciunas (LTU)	Tim Hire (GBR)	Alastair Brown (GBR)	
2024	5 / 39	Hugo Sköld Orr (SWE)	Mia Marin Lilienthal (EST)	Jonathan Hammarström (SWE)	
2024	6 / 9	Andrea De Matteis (ITA)	Francesco Columbano (ITA)	Jeppe Krat (DEN)	
2024	7 /12	Erik Rahm (SWE)	Aron Wärnberg (SWE)	William Karlsson (SWE)	
