= Madras Youth Choir =

Organization in Chennai, Tamil Nadu

The Madras Youth Choir, based in Chennai, India, is a non-profit, voluntary organization, is the brainchild of the late composer and pioneer of Indian Choral Music, Shri. M. B. Sreenivasan. It was founded in 1971 and is one of the oldest choirs of its kind in India, after the Calcutta Youth Choir founded in 1958. It is presently led by Shri. P._C._Ramakrishna, a veteran theatre actor and voice artist based in Chennai, India. The Secretary and other senior members are dedicated to the cause of spreading the movement of this genre of music. In 2024 The Madras Youth Choir was renamed in the memory of M. B. Sreenivasan as the Madras MBS Choir (MMC)

== Overview ==
India has had a long and rich history of group singing but the western style choir with harmonic arrangements were confined to the churches until M. B. Sreenivasan (MBS) arrived in the scene. MBS introduced the people's choral music to create a mass musical movement. He believed that music should be a tool for social change and national integration.

The Madras Youth Choir consists of choristers from soprano to bass, practicing a variety of songs based on Indian classical and folk music idioms adapting western harmonic arrangements. The Madras Youth Choir is a recipient of an annual grant from the Sangeet Natak Akademi for its Community Singing Programme. Its significant repertoire consists of themes such as national integration, environment, children, social values and the awakening of youth. The choir sings in as many as ten languages and takes the songs of national poets to schools to train children to perform at special occasions.

The Choir has been recognized as a reputed organization and has been called upon to perform in various places all over India, independently and along with regional youth choirs, as well as for Doordharshan and All India Radio. The Choir has also performed at Delhi under the auspices of Sangeet Natak Akademi on many occasions. Many corporate organizations, banks, private and voluntary institutions, continue to invite the Choir to perform for their special functions.

== Work ==
MYC has released a twin album CD "Pallupaduvomey" hoping it will bring the choir to the limelight. The Choir is taking efforts to convey the greatness of MBS’s music in tangible terms to the public, with the belief that once people are given the chance to appreciate the music in authentic terms, they will flock to it.

MYC conducts workshops at regular intervals to create an awareness of this genre of music and also initiate those who may become interested in choral music once they got to know it better.

MYC has preserved the verdant choral pieces of Shri. M. B. Sreenivasan after his death.

MYC has now extended its activities to forming a Junior Group as well as a sub-junior group. Efforts are being made to also form a college choir drawing youth from various city colleges, who would be trained in this musical genre.
