= 12ft Skiff =

Sailing skiff class

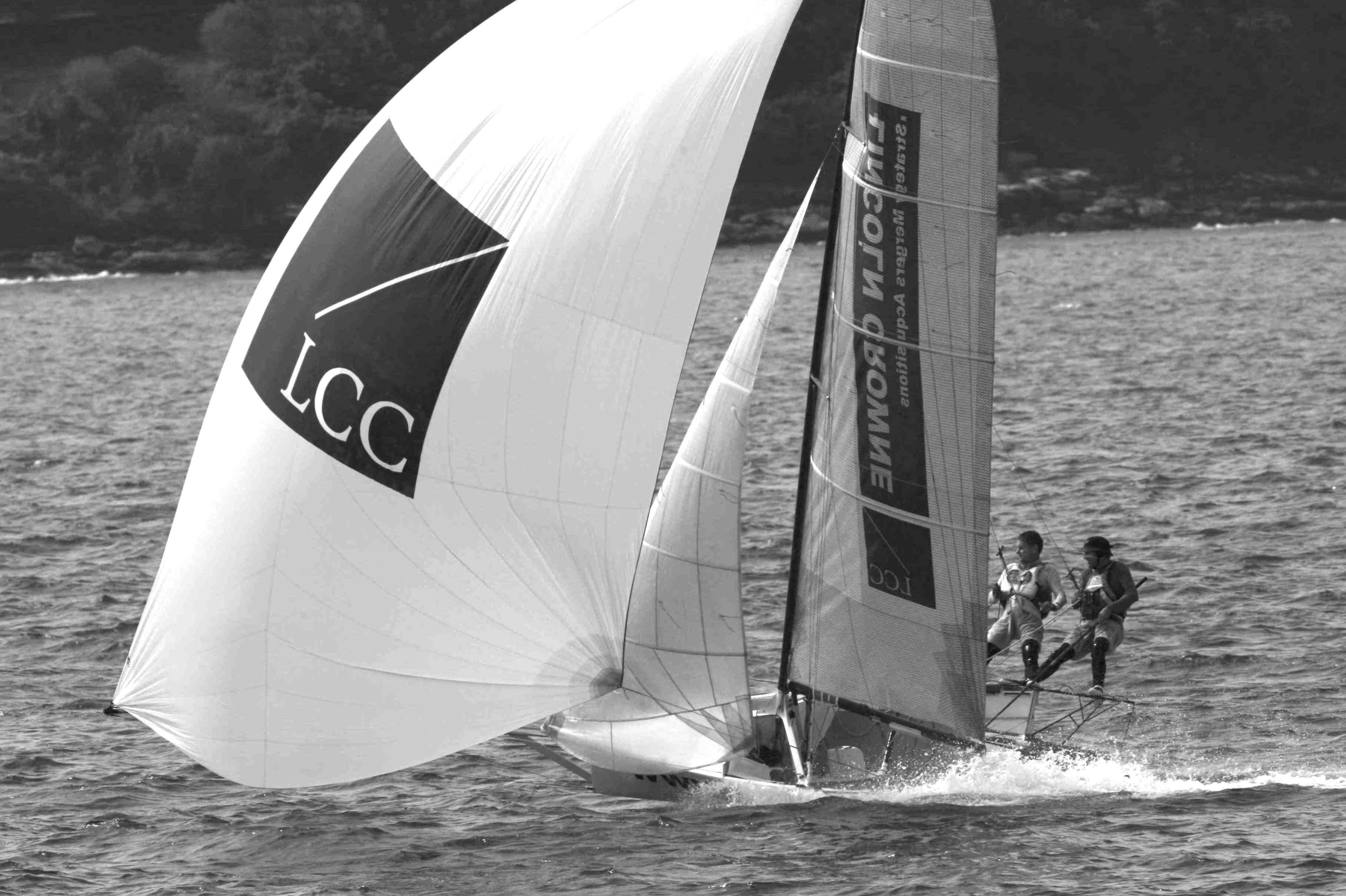
- 12 foot skiff in Sydney Harbour

Boat
- Crew: 2

Hull
- Hull weight: 45 kg (99 lb)
- LOA: 3.7 m (12 ft)
- Beam: 1.8 m (5 ft 11 in)

Rig
- Mast height: 8.8 m (29 ft)

The 12 ft Skiff is a development dinghy class dating back to the early 20th century. It is sailed in Australia and New Zealand. It is 12 ft (3.7 m) in length, hence the name, and is a two-man boat. Both the crew and the helm are able to use the trapeze at the same time. It has an asymmetrical spinnaker and a jib, in addition to the mainsail.

== History ==
The origin of the 12 ft Skiff is dubious, but it is thought to have roots in the smaller skiffs sailed on Sydney Harbour in the late 1800s. The skiff became a class in its own right in 1926 when, at a meeting between Lane Cove 12ft Sailing Skiff Club, Greenwich 12 ft Flying Squadron, The Spit 12 ft Skiff Sailing Club and Vaucluse Amateur 12 ft Sailing Skiff Club, the 12 ft Sailing Skiff Council was formed. At this time the skiff was manned by a crew of five, but around the 1940s it changed to a three-man boat, and then became the two man boat that is used today. In 1947 the Council changed its name to the NSW 12 ft Sailing Skiff Association. After the 1940s the skiff went international.

== Design ==
- Overall length 3.7 metres
- Beam 1.8 metres
- Crewed by two people, both on trapeze
- Light weight 45 kilogram hull
- Sail area and rig design are unlimited
- Mast height is unlimited but can be up to 8.8 metres
- Most boats have three complete rigs (small, medium, large)
- Each skiff is individual, not an off the shelf product
- Simple measurement rules allow design development
- The asymmetrical spinnaker is set off a fixed bowsprit

== Sailing and racing ==
Today the 12 ft Skiff is primarily sailed in Australia and New Zealand.

Sailing a 12 ft Skiff involves boat handling, tuning and maintenance. Modern boats use carbon-fibre masts and other updated equipment.

== Performance ==
The 12 ft Skiff is similar to the larger and better known 18ft Skiff. Of all skiffs the 12 footer is known for being the most difficult to sail, primarily due to its short and narrow hull relative to its large sail area. A 12 ft Skiff is capable of sailing at speeds of up to 25 knots (46 km/h; 29 mph).

The 12 ft Skiff generates considerable power by having two persons on the trapeze wire, suspended from the mast of the boat. This adds leverage to the crews' weight, allowing the larger areas of sail to be carried.

The modern 12 ft Skiffs also have fixed bowsprits from which they carry their spinnakers. This is a relatively recent innovation, with the older style of skiff having an 'end to end' spinnaker pole which would need to be positioned by the crew, and would be stored against the skiff's boom when it was not being used.

== Regattas ==
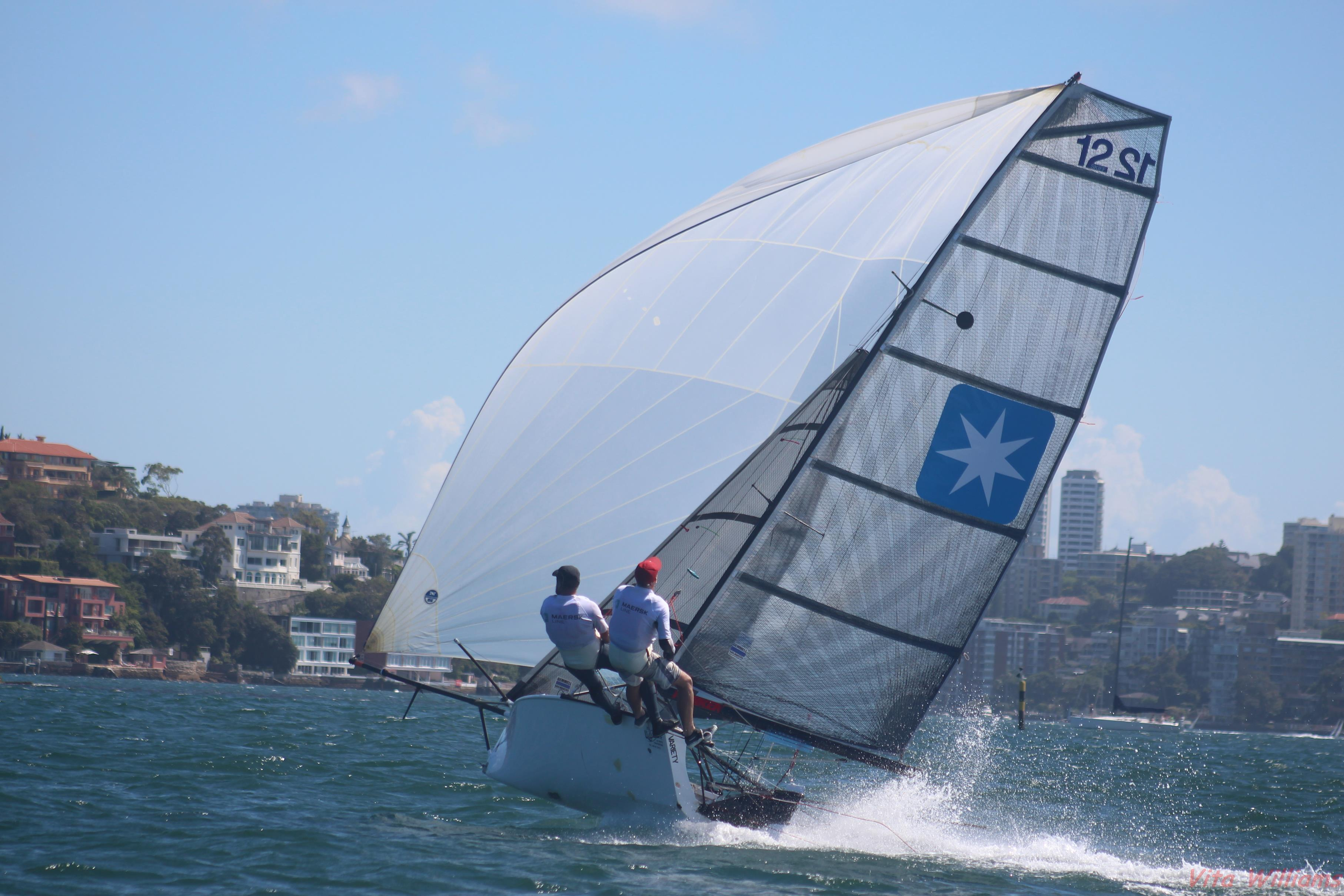
Maersk Line 12ft Skiff

=== Australia ===
- New South Wales State Championship "The Morna Cup"
- Queensland State Championship
- Australia Championship "Norman Booth Trophy"

=== New Zealand ===
- New Zealand team trials
- New Zealand National Championship

=== International ===
- Interdominon Championship "Silasec Trophy"
