= Manly Junior =

Type of racing dinghy

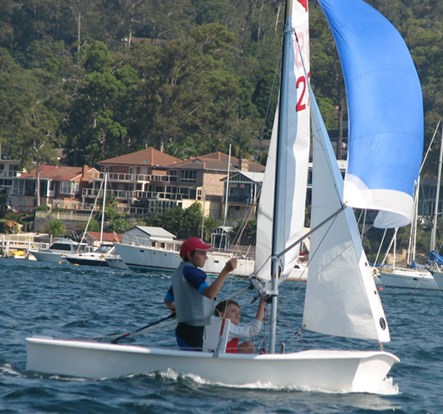
- Two boys on their Manly Junior

Development
- Designer: Ralph Tobias
- Location: Sydney, Australia
- Year: 1959
- Role: Junior trainer

Boat
- Crew: 2

Hull
- Construction: Plywood, Fiberglass
- Hull weight: 31.75 kilograms (70.0 lb)
- LOA: 2.6 metres (8.5 ft)
- Beam: 1.1 metres (3.6 ft)

Sails
- Mainsail area: 4.1 square metres (44 sq ft)
- Jib/genoa area: 1.2 square metres (13 sq ft)
- Spinnaker area: 2.1 square metres (23 sq ft)

The Manly Junior is a junior racing dinghy class popular in Sydney Australia. It was designed in 1959 for younger sailors and the length (2.6 m) was originally designed so that the boat could be stored vertically downstairs inside Manly Yacht Club (the founding club). To provide as much performance as possible in a short length, the designer, Ralph Tobias used a "snub" bow.

Typically the helmsman is aged 10~14 and the crew 7~11 years old. It is amongst the smallest of classes with a "full rig": mainsail, jib and spinnaker. The class has a strict set of rules on sail size, shape and hull construction. Some variation is allowed in the details of how the boat is rigged (position of fittings etc.).

The class has made some significant changes since inception, in 1967 the buoyancy tanks were redesigned to allow the boat to come up after a capsize with little water on board. In the 1980s the class underwent a transition from plywood to fibreglass hulls. In 2000 false floors were added allowing the boat to completely drain of water after a capsize or swamping.

Racing is competitive with many previous sailors going on to become world or Olympic Games champions in other classes. The skill level shown at a State or National event is high with racing being completed in up to 30 knots (56 km/h) of wind.

Many children however join in for the social side. Sometimes you will get two 11-year-old friends match up to have fun while learning. Other times the younger children look up to the older children as "heroes". Club racing is often like a friendly "family" where the focus is on learning. Even at major events "Novice" (learning) fleets allow the less experienced to compete and enjoy the fun.

As the sailors grow they often move onto Flying Eleven (dinghy) and or Cherub(dinghy)

A quick count would suggest over 30,000 children have been introduced to sailing via the Manly Junior fleet.
