= Manly Yacht Club =

Australian sailing club

Coordinates: 33°48′11″S 151°17′07″E

- Burgee
- Founded: 1950
- Based in: Manly, NSW
- Website: www.myc.org.au

Manly Yacht Club (MYC) is a sailing club in the suburb of Manly on the Northern Beaches of Sydney, in the state of New South Wales, Australia.

== History ==
Manly Yacht Club was formed in 1950 as the Manly 14 ft Skiff Club. In the late 1950s a training boat called the Manly Junior was introduced.

The 1960s was a busy decade with the formulation of the Yachting Division and the Manly Graduate division. The club's name was subsequently changed to the Manly Yacht Club. In the early 1980s the club moved into the present building which was the site of the former Gentlemen's Baths, 'the largest and most efficiently equipped gentlemen's swimming baths in the state', opened in 1892. In October 1926, a new Olympic pool with a grandstand to seat 1400 people was opened at a cost of £11,000.

The Baths suffered severe storm damage in May 1974 and were closed in April 1976. The Harbord Diggers swimming club held a ceremony with special guests Sir Robert Askin and Fitz Lough, who had swum at the baths for seventy years. At the last race a wreath was floated in the pool. It was said that since the first race had been held in 1890 the pool had seen more Olympic champions in action than any other swimming centre in this country. Early in 1977 the Manly Yacht Club submitted plans to convert the remaining buildings for boat storage, and has been in residence ever since.
