= Pelican (dinghy) =

Type of pram dinghy

Boat
- Crew: 2

Hull
- Hull weight: 54 kilograms (119 lb) (min)
- LOA: 2.900 metres (9 ft 6.2 in)

Sails
- Jib/genoa area: none

The Pelican is a pram dinghy, peculiar to Perth, Western Australia

== Design ==
It is similar to the ubiquitous Mirror, being a gunter-rigged pram designed for a crew of two. However, it's a little smaller and is usually rigged only with main and spinnaker. Originally constructed in timber, many are now constructed in fibreglass. A variant of the Pelican class sailed at Lake Macquarie is also rigged with a jib.

== Foils ==
The rudder is made from wood or fibreglass. The daggerboard is made of aluminium improving its longevity and ease of maintenance.

== Sails ==
In 2014 the class rules were updated to allow Polyester Laminate sails (Mylar). This and Dacron are the only materials allowed.

The class evolved in the 1950s from the tenders of local sail boats – these were jury rigged with sails for races between crews of sail boats moored at Rottnest Island. The class peaked with over 270 hulls registered with about 70 currently active (cite WA newspapers report Jan 2008).

It remains a popular beginners' dingy class in Perth.

== Class associations ==
- The Pelican Sailing Association
