= Spiral (dinghy) =

Class of sailing dinghy

Development
- Designer: Alan Warwick
- Design: One-Design
- Name: Spiral

Boat
- Crew: 1

Hull
- Type: Monohull
- Construction: Fiberglass
- Hull weight: 55 kg (121 lb)
- LOA: 3.8 m (12 ft 6 in)
- Beam: 1.4 m (4 ft 7 in)

Sails
- Upwind sail area: 6.5 m^{2} (70 sq ft)

The Spiral is a type or class of sailing dinghy. It is similar to a Laser (dinghy), but is smaller and easier to manoeuvre on land and in water, and suited to a skipper of smaller body weight and more fun to sail in heavier conditions than is a Laser due to its greatly improved wider interior for the sailor.
