= Sabre (dinghy) =

Class of sailing dinghy

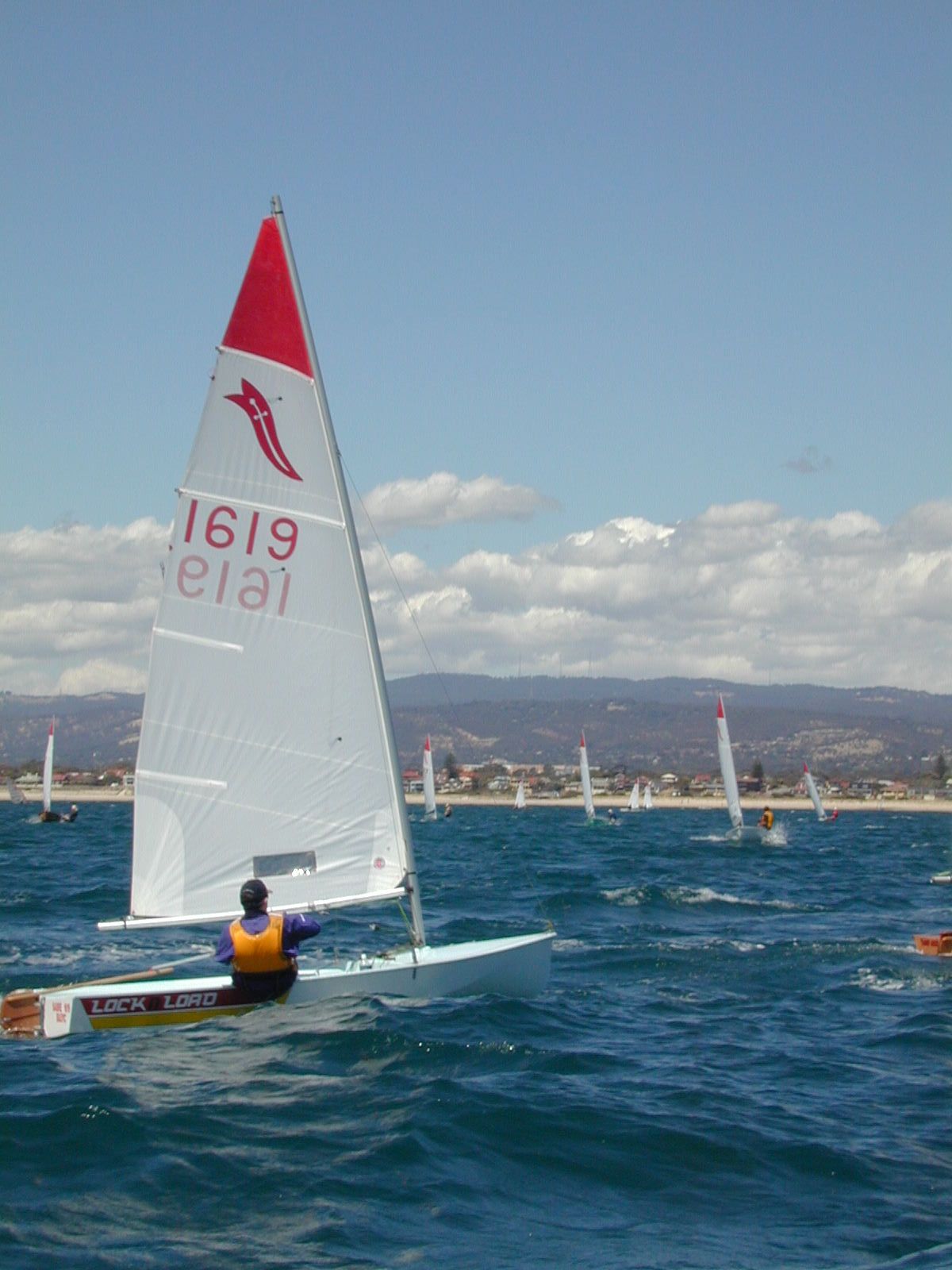
- At Brighton & Seacliff Yacht Club

Boat
- Crew: 1

Hull
- Hull weight: 41 kg (90 lb)
- LOA: 3,770 mm (148 in)
- LWL: 3,352 mm (132.0 in)
- Beam: 1,473 mm (58.0 in)

Rig
- Mast height: 5,335 mm (210.0 in)

Sails
- Mainsail area: 6.4 m^{2} (69 sq ft)

The Sabre Dinghy is a class single-handed sailboat that is 12'4" or 3.76 m long. The boat was designed in 1974 by Rex Fettell, who also designed the Minnow. As of 2017 over 2,000 sail numbers have been issued.

In the 2012 Australian National Titles, there were 130 boats on the start line, making it one of the largest national championships to be held that year of any class boat in Australia. The first national championships were held at Lake Cootharaba in Queensland in 1979.

The boat is built in either fibreglass or as a composite (timber deck and fibreglass hull) or plywood by the stitch and glue method and weighs in at minimum of 41 kg (90 lbs).

Due to its accessible nature, it is suited to sailors of varying abilities, and is popular both with learners and weaker sailors who find boats like the Laser overpowering.

In Australia the Sabre is sailed in over 36 clubs in the state of Victoria, where it is one of the most active supporters of Victorian Yachting Council activities. The fleets in Victoria are at Albert Park Yacht Club, Albert Sailing Club, Altona Yacht Club, Apollo Bay Sailing Club, Ballarat Yacht Club, Beaumaris Yacht Club, Bendigo Yacht Club, Black Rock Yacht Club, Blairgowrie Yacht Squadron, Cairn Curran Sailing Club, Carrum Sailing Club, Chelsea Yacht Club, Colac Yacht Club, Corio Bay Sailing Club, Cowes Yacht Club, Davey's Bay Yacht Club, Elwood Sailing Club, Flinders Yacht Club, Frankston Yacht Club, Gippsland Lakes Yacht Club, Hampton Sailing Club, Indented Head Yacht Club, Lake Boga Yacht Club, Latrobe Valley Yacht Club, Lysterfield Sailing Club, McCrae Yacht Club, Mordialloc Sailing Club, Mt Martha Yacht Club, Parkdale Yacht Club, Portarlington Sailing Club, Rye Yacht Club, Safety Beach Sailing Club, Somers Yacht Club, Sugarloaf Sailing Club, Westernport Yacht Club and Williamstown Sailing Club.

Small fleets in South Australia are centred on the Brighton and Seacliff Yacht Club, Wallaroo Sailing Club and Port River Sailing Club.

Western Australia has strong fleets sailing out of Maylands Yacht Club, Perth Dinghy Sailing Club and Royal Perth Yacht Club.

Tasmania has fleets sailing out of Burnie Yacht Club, Deviot Sailing Club, Lindisfarne Sailing Club, Midway Point Yacht Club, Montrose Bay Yacht Club and Wynyard.

The boat is also well represented in New South Wales with Connells Point Sailing Club, Kogarah Bay Sailing Club (15 boats), Richmond River Sailing Club, Woollahra Sailing Club, St George Sailing Club, Twofold Bay YC and Wallagoot Lake Boat Club

Queensland has fleets at Maroochy Sailing Club and the Royal Queensland Yacht Squadron. Tweed Valley Sailing Club (NSW) has a growing fleet. Sabre's can be found at Cleveland Yacht Club, Tin Can Bay Yacht Club, Southport Yacht Club and Lake Cootharaba Sailing Club. In the past Cleveland Yacht Club has had many boats and even held the national championships in 2002, but interest in the boat has dropped off and now Maroochy Sailing Club and Royal Qld Yacht Squadron have the two largest fleets.

Australian Capital Territory sail out of the Canberra Yacht Club. With the Nationals to be run in 2028 the class is surging with a fleet of 11 boats.

Sabre Dinghy National Champions
Year	National Champion	Boat #	Ladies Champion	Boat #	Venue
2022	Alan Riley	2094	Susan Hextell	2022	Canberra Yacht Club ACT
2021	Event not held due to coronavirus pandemic				
2020	Alan Riley	2094	Lauren Keil	2091	Wallaroo Sailing Club SA
2019	Alan Riley	2094	Lauren Keil	2091	Royal Queensland Yacht Squadron Qld
2018	Scott Olson	2059	Megan de Lange	2089	Perth Dinghy Sailing Club WA
2017	Jon Holroyd	1778	Susannah Gillam	2039	Black Rock Vic
2016	Craig McPhee	1832	Lauren Keil	1691	Derwent Sailing Squadron Tas
2015	Mark Soulsby	2030	Laura Baker	1773	Adelaide Sailing Club SA
2014	Scott Olson	1897	Laura Baker	1773	Perth Dinghy Sailing Club WA
2013	Peter Hackett	1932	Susan Hextell	1724	Royal Queensland Yacht Squadron Qld
2012	Chris Dance	1778	Laura Baker	1773	Blairgowrie Vic
2011	Chris Dance	1778	Laura Baker	1773	Brighton-Seacliffe SA
2010	Callum Burns	1743	Fiona Martin	1590	Bellerive Tas
2009	Alex Newman	1769	Fiona McCulloch	1776	Safety Beach Vic
2008	John Gratton	1698	Fiona McCulloch	1596	Brighton-Seacliffe SA
2007	Wayne Bates	1610	Fiona McCulloch	1596	Cleveland Qld
2006	Wayne Bates	1610	Maree Early	1613	Lindisfarne Tas
2005	Alan Riley	1564	Fiona McCulloch	1596	Twofold Bay NSW
2004	Wayne Bates	1610	Maree Early	1613	Blairgowrie Vic
2003	Wayne Bates	1610	Maree Early	1613	Brighton-Seacliffe SA
2002	Michael Johnson	1596	Maree Early	1613	Cleveland Qld
2001	Michael Johnson	1596	Maree Early	1613	Lindisfarne Tas
2000	Damien Pound	1565	Krystal Weir	1233	Toukley NSW
1999	Arthur Brett	1552	Faye Mckenzie	298	Black Rock Vic
1998	Nick Mouat	1283	Jacinta Baker	1345	Largs Bay SA
1997	Richard Kingsmill	1319	Maree Early	1437	Runaway Bay Qld
1996	Nick Mouat	1283	Not Awarded		Lindisfarne Tas
1995	Andrew Sayle	1287	Maree Early	1267	Gippsland Lakes Vic
1994	Jon Holroyd	1432	Katie Holroyd	1287	Speers Pt NSW
1993	Paul Phillips	1426	Laura Baker	1091	Brighton-Seacliffe SA
1992	John Lurie	1432	Nicole Gibson	850	Kingston Tas
1991	Scott Glanville	1267	Lee Ives	1283	Lake Boga Vic
1990	Leigh Glanville	1267	Nicole Gibson	632	Rye Vic
1989	Owen McMahon	400	Lee Ives	1254	Largs Bay SA
1988	Lee Ives	1254	Lee Ives	1254	Lindisfarne Tas
1987	Paul Richards	944	Lee Ives	1191	Gippsland Lakes Vic
1986	Wayne Bates	1144	Jeni Lidgett	969	Lake Cairn Curren Vic
1985	Wayne Bates	1144	Jeni Lidgett	969	Brighton-Seacliffe SA
1984	Alex Howard	943	Jane Purbrick	1120	Lake Boga Vic
1983	Paul Chodziesner	777	Jane Purbrick	851	Botany Bay NSW
1982	Andrew Lechte	777	Jane Purbrick	851	Largs Bay SA
1981	Stuart Wallace	855	Jenny Theisz	542	Blairgowrie Vic
1980	Peter Anderson	800	Lisa Donald	788	Lake Wallagoot NSW
1979	Peter Anderson	800	Not Awarded		Lake Cootharaba Qld
