= NS14 (dinghy class) =

Australian sailing dinghy

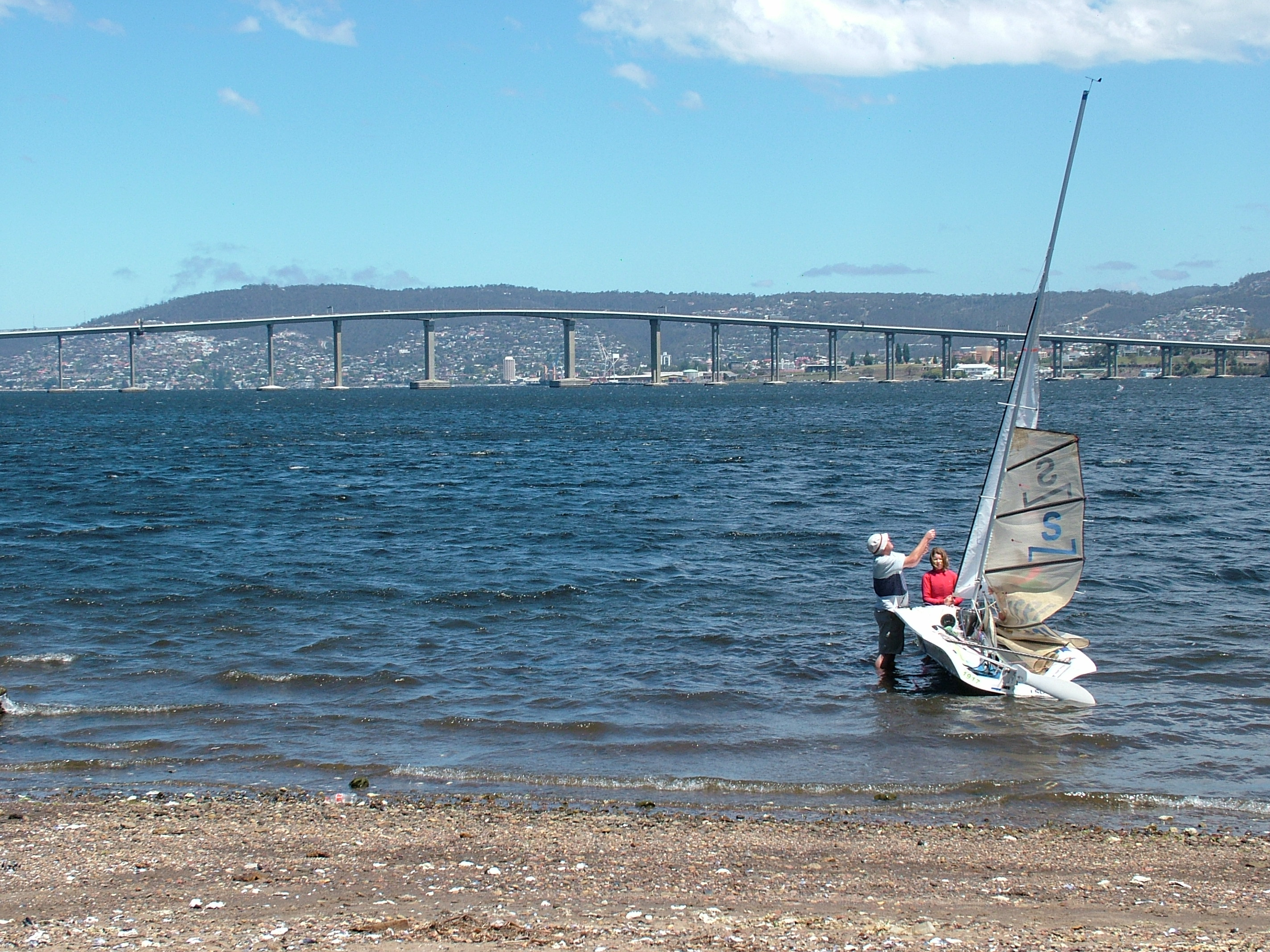
- An NS14 being prepared for sailing near the Tasman Bridge, Hobart.

- The class symbol consisting of an "S" positioned above a stretched capital "N"

Boat
- Crew: 2

Hull
- Hull weight: 64 kilograms (141 lb)
- LOA: 4.27 metres (14.0 ft)
- Beam: 1.6–1.8 metres (5.2–5.9 ft)

Sails
- Mainsail area: 6.9–7.0 square metres (74–75 sq ft)
- Jib/genoa area: 2.3 square metres (25 sq ft)
- Upwind sail area: 9.3 square metres (100 sq ft)

Racing
- D-PN: 108.0
- RYA PN: 1028

The NS14 (or Northbridge Senior 14) is an Australian restricted development class of sailing dinghy, measuring 14 feet in length. The class was designed in 1960 and introduced at the Northbridge sailing club in Sydney, Australia, with control of the class transferred to the NS14 Association of New South Wales in 1965. Subsequently the boat was introduced to the other states, prior to being taken to New Zealand in 1995 and the United States in 1998.

Designed around the New Zealand Javelin dinghy (Australasia) hull, the boat was designed to be a high performance class for family sailing. The class has neither a trapeze nor spinnaker, which allows it to be easily handled by both novice and family crews.

The NS14 class is commonly sailed by family crews with combinations of two adults or an adult and child both common. The limited sail area generally keeps loads low and this gives a wide range of crews an ability to compete against one another. The development nature of the class has allowed it to significantly evolve since inception and it is capable of performing well against other classes with greater sail area or more righting moment. Crews are able to modify their boats to suit their particular circumstances and crew weight and to incorporate innovative new ideas where allowed by the class rules.

Rig Development The NS14 was one of the pioneers of the use of wing masts on small sailing dinghies. The modest sail area limit required designers to push for efficient high power, low drag rigs and this was achieved through the use of a rotating wing mast. Early masts were made of wood while later aluminium and then carbon masts gave lighter and lighter options. Along with the wing mast section, NS14’s have used fully battened large roached mainsails to push the available sail area higher to capture the benefit of stronger winds aloft. The use of full length battens allows a large roach and gives excellent control over the sail profile.

Hull Development NS14 hull design has significantly evolved from its initial form. Box rule limitations ensure that the designs are all comparable but allow significant scope for design development. Designers such as Michael Nash and more recently Stuart Freizer released multiple designs through their long association with the class which have resulted in incrementally faster hull shapes. Hull designs have progressed toward U-shaped sections forward with significant flat sections to maximise lift while keeping waterlines as narrow as class beam requirements allow. The class rules allow a relatively beamy hull which maximises the righting moment achievable from two crew hiking. Self-draining cockpits are the norm and allow the boats to quickly recover after a capsize. Rudder and centerboard design are open and take high aspect, low drag shapes.
