= RS Aero =

Sailboat class

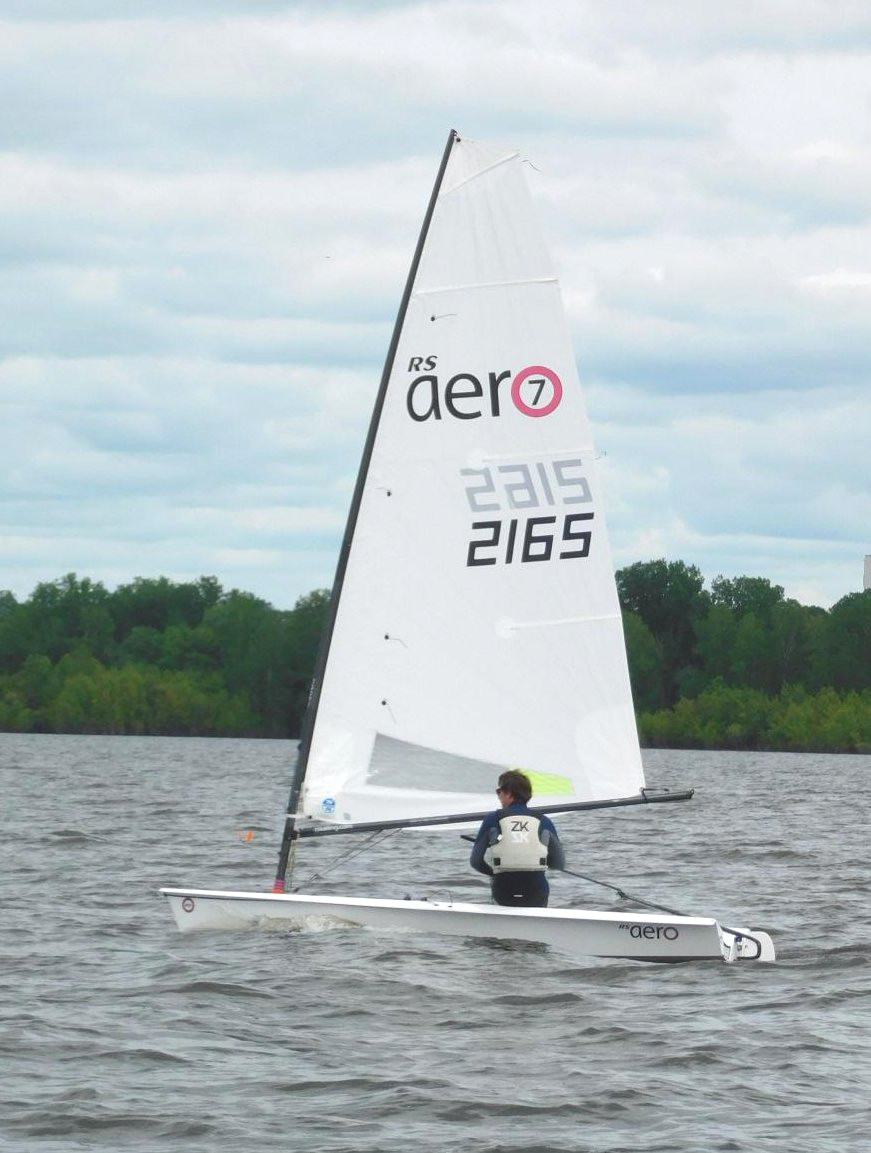
- RS Aero 7

Development
- Designer: Jo Richards
- Location: United Kingdom
- Year: 2014
- Builder: RS Sailing

Boat
- Crew: 1
- Displacement: 30 kg

Hull
- Type: Monohull
- Construction: Fiberglass
- LOA: 4 m (13 ft)
- Beam: 1.4 m (4 ft 7 in)

Sails
- General: 5, 6, 7 & 9 rigs
- Total sail area: 5 rig : 5.2 m² 6 rig : 6.3 m² 7 rig : 7.4 m² 9 rig : 8.9 m²

Racing
- RYA PN: 5 rig : 1139 6 rig : 1099 7 rig : 1063 9 rig : 1005

The RS Aero is a British sailing dinghy that was designed by Jo Richards as a one-design racer and first built in 2014. It is an international class recognised by World Sailing and hosts an annual World Championships.

== Production ==
The design is marketed and distributed by RS Sailing of Romsey, United Kingdom.

== Design ==
The RS Aero is a single-handed recreational sailboat, built predominantly of fiberglass. It has an unstayed carbon fibre mast, a raked stem, a vertical transom, a transom-hung rudder controlled by a tiller with a tiller extension and a daggerboard. It displaces 66 lb (30 kg).

The Aero can be fitted with one of four different rig and sail sizes to accommodate a range of sailors of different weights, ranging between approximately 45 and 95kg.

== Variants ==
RS Aero 5
The RS Aero 5 was designed with youth in mind and has 5.2 m² of sail area. It is typically suitable for sailors between 45 and 65kg.
RS Aero 6
The RS Aero 6 was designed in 2019 and released in 2021 with the aim of providing an option for women and smaller adults to sail in a less youth-centric fleet. It was designed to fit between the 5 and 7 rigs with a sail size of 6.3 m². It is typically suitable for sailors between 55 and 75kg.
RS Aero 7
The RS Aero 7 was designed for medium weight sailors and has 7.4 m² of sail area. It is typically suitable for sailors between 65 and 85kg.
RS Aero 9
The RS Aero 9 was designed for heavy weight sailors and has 8.9 m² of sail area. It is typically suitable for sailors between 75 and 95kg.

== Operational history ==
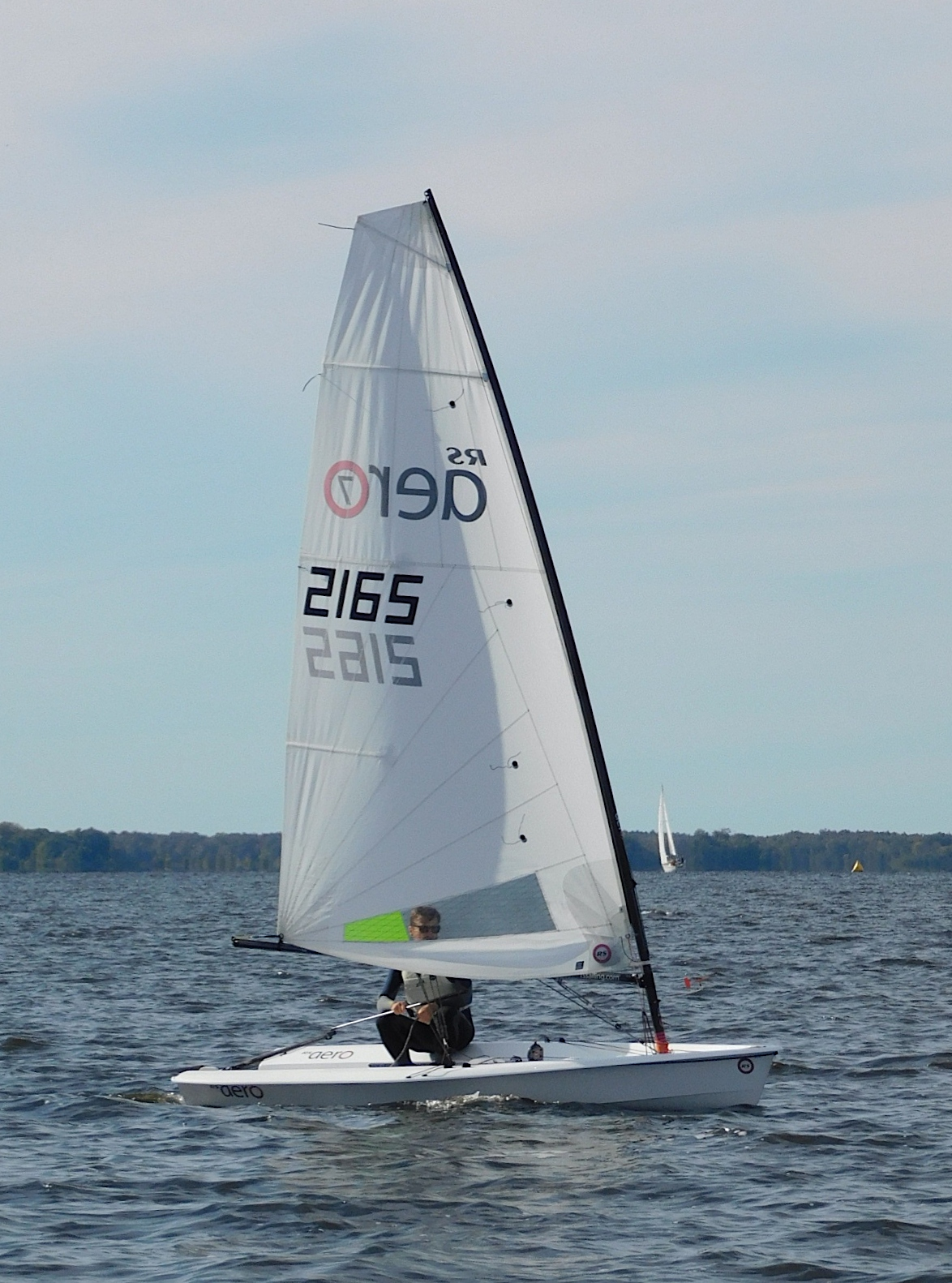
RS Aero 7

The design has won several awards, including the 2014 Paris Boat Show Coup de Coeurs, the Netherlands 2015 HISWA Product of the Year Award and the 2015 Estonian Sailing Federation Surprise Award.

The boat was also named the Sailing World Boat Of The Year in 2015, as Best One-Design. The magazine described it as "a stunning singlehander that is more than comparable to the Laser." It was cited for its "construction quality, lightweight hull, versatile rig with multiple combinations, technical details, and price".

In a 2014 review, George Yioulos, wrote, "sailing the Aero is unlike other boat I’ve evaluated before. It’s a designer’s brew of lightweight construction, precise craftsmanship, and clever design that allows for high quality production in multiple locations. While it’s still a single-person fiberglass dinghy, after a day on the water it’s more an extension of the sailor themselves than any other non-trapezing boat I’ve sailed." He further noted, "The Aero utilizes a unique mix of modern technology, all-around performance and very easy handling. Maybe it’s not ironic that these are similar to the characteristics that propelled the growth of the Laser some 40 years ago."

== Events ==
=== World Championship ===
==== RS Aero 5 ====
===== Male =====
Year	Gold	Silver	Bronze
2017	Andrew Frost (GBR)	Sander Puppart (EST)	Andrias Sillaste (EST)
2018	Ben Hutton-Penman (GBR)	Andrew Frost (GBR)	Toby Schofield (GBR)
2019	David Ellis (GBR)	Kazuyoshi Nakao (JPN)	Ned Stattersfield (GBR)
2022	Dieter Creitz (USA)	Ryan Zehnder (USA)	Yannick Gloster (USA)
2023	Elliot Hellstrom (SWE)	Andrias Sillaste (EST)	Mark Ripley (GBR)
2024	Jonathan Bailey (GBR)	Roscoe Martin (GBR)	Sammy Isaacs-Johnson (GBR)
2025	Raphael Olsthoorn (FRA)	Roscoe Martin (GBR)	Riccardo Hai Gessa (ITA)

===== Female =====
Year	Gold	Silver	Bronze
2017	Kate Sargent (GBR)	Karlijn Van De Boogaard (NED)	Jullie WIllis (GBR)
2018	Liina Kolk (EST)	Kate Sargent (GBR)	Lucy Greenwood (GBR)
2019	Sophie Jackson (AUS)	Megan Ridgway (AUS)	Phillippa Danks (AUS)
2022	Caroline Young (USA)	Robyn Ratcliffe (AUS)	Yolanda Fan (CHN)
2023	Chloe George (GBR)	Francesca Ramazzotti (ITA)	Ludovica Cui (ITA)
2024	Georgia Booth (GBR)	Alice Davis (GBR)	Alice Lucy (GBR)
2025	Chloe George (GBR)	Georgia Booth (GBR)	Louise Rahn (FRA)

==== RS Aero 6 ====
===== Male =====
Year	Gold	Silver	Bronze
2023	Rhett Gowans (AUS)	Dieter Creitz (USA)	Andrew Frost (GBR)
2024	Andrew Frost (GBR)	Dan Venables (GBR)	Sam Blaker (GBR)
2025	Sam Blaker (GBR)	Andrew Frost (GBR)	Dan Venables (GBR)

===== Female =====
Year	Gold	Silver	Bronze
2023	Sofiia Naumenko (UKR)	Liina Kolk (EST)	Ellie Craig (GBR)
2024	Sofiia Naumenko (UKR)	Abby Hire (GBR)	Liina Kolk (EST)
2025	Sofiia Naumenko (UKR)	Liina Kolk (EST)	Anouck de Ripainsel (BEL)

==== Male ====
Year	Gold	Silver	Bronze
2017	Stephen Cockerill (GBR)	Peter Barton (GBR)	Paul Bartlett (GBR)
2018	Sam Whaley (GBR)	Jack Hopkins (GBR)	Stephen Cockerill (GBR)
2019	Rhett Gowans (AUS)	Marc Jacobi (USA)	Noah Rees (GBR)
2022	Dalton Bergan (USA)	Jay Renehan (USA)	Peter Barton (GBR)
2023	Peter Barton (GBR)	Jack Miller (GBR)	Noah Rees (GBR)
2024	Finley Dickinson (GBR)	Arthur Farley (GBR)	Tim Hire (GBR)
2025	Peter Barton (GBR)	Jack Miller (GBR)	Mark Ripley (GBR)

===== Female =====
Year	Gold	Silver	Bronze
2017	Liina Kolk (EST)	Juliane Barthel (GER)	Sarah Cockerill (GBR)
2018	Juliane Barthel (GER)	Sarah Cockerill (GBR)	Caitlin Atkin (GBR)
2019	Fleur Scrivens (AUS)		
2023	Juliane Barthel (GER)	Julie Lamarre (SWE)	
2024	Ellie Craig (GBR)		
2025	Paula Boyle (GBR)	Nolwenn Falcon (FRA)	

==== RS Aero 9 ====
Year	Gold	Silver	Bronze
2017	Marc Jacobi (USA)	Liam Willis (GBR)	Greg Bartlett (GBR)
2018	Marc Jacobi (USA)	Peter Barton (GBR)	George Cousins (GBR)
2019	Liam Willis (GBR)	Derek Bottles (USA)	Keith Willis (GBR)
2022	Dan Falk (USA)	Keith Hammer (USA)	Michael Johnson (USA)
2023	Dan Falk (USA)	Madhavan Thirumalai (USA)	Keith Hammer (USA)
2024	Ben Flower (CAN)	Peter Barton (GBR)	Erik Wahlberg (SWE)
2025	Ben Flower (CAN)	Nick Craig (GBR)	Madhavan Thirumalai (USA)

=== European Championship ===
==== RS Aero 5 ====
===== Male =====
Year	Gold	Silver	Bronze
2016	Archie Hainsworth (GBR)	Andrias Sillaste (EST)	
2019	Attila Banyai (HUN)	Andrew Frost (GBR)	Sammy Isaacs-Johnson (GBR)
2021	Attila Banyai (HUN)	Roy Van Maanen (IRE)	Axel Almersson (SWE)
2022	Roscoe Martin (GBR)	Tom Ahlheid (GBR)	Andrew Frost (GBR)
2024	Enrico Loi (ITA)	Mattia Monti (ITA)	Andrea Manconi (ITA)
2025	Sammy Isaacs-Johnson (GBR)	Andrias Sillaste (EST)	Enrico Loi (ITA)

===== Female =====
Year	Gold	Silver	Bronze
2016	Lucy Greenwood (GBR)	Silvia Johanna Haavel (EST)	
2019	Liina Kolk (EST)	Caitlin Atkin (GBR)	Lily Barrett (GBR)
2021	Francesca Ramazzotti (ITA)	Vanja Ramm-Ericson (SWE)	Anouck de Ripainsel (BEL)
2022	Chloe George (GBR)	Abby Hire (GBR)	Alessandra Tydeman (GBR)
2024	Florence Le Brun (FRA)	Vittoria Cartelli (ITA)	Anka Staite (GBR)
2025	Jessica Jöesaar (EST)	Sophie Stockton (GBR)	Nathalie Jacob (FRA)

==== RS Aero 6 ====
===== Male =====
Year	Gold	Silver	Bronze
2022	Chris Hatton (GBR)	Ants Haavel (EST)	Chris Rust (GBR)
2024	Andrew Frost (GBR)	Dan Venables (GBR)	Chris Hatton (GBR)
2025	Andrew Frost (GBR)	Filippo Vincis (ITA)	Kristo Ounap (EST)

===== Female =====
Year	Gold	Silver	Bronze
2022	Abigail Larr (GBR)	Cathy Lunn (GBR)	Beth Milledge (GBR)
2024	Sofiia Naumenko (UKR)	Ellie Craig (GBR)	Liina Kolk (EST)
2025	Sofiia Naumenko (UKR)	Liina Kolk (EST)	Juliane Barthel (GER)

==== RS Aero 7 ====
===== Male =====
Year	Gold	Silver	Bronze
2016	Dmitry Tretyakov (RUS)	Kristo Ounap (EST)	Simonas Jersovas (LTU)
2019	Peter Barton (GBR)	Craig Williamson (GBR)	Jack Hopkins (GBR)
2021	Peter Barton (GBR)	Leopoldo Sirolli (ITA)	Giulio Sirolli (ITA)
2022	Martis Pajarskas (LTU)	Tim Hire (GBR)	Vejas Strelciunas (LTU)
2024	Pim Van Vugt (NED)	Noah Rees (GBR)	Jack Miler (GBR)
2025	Mattia Di Lorenzo (ITA)	Peter Barton (GBR)	Mark Ripley (GBR)

===== Female =====
Year	Gold	Silver	Bronze
2016	Liina Kolk (EST)	Juliane Barthel (GER)	Jane Peckham (GBR)
2019	Juliane Barthel (GER)	Eleanor Craig (GBR)	Jane Peckham (GBR)
2021	Julie Lamarre (SWE)		
2022	Anya Haji-Michael (GBR)		
2024	Juliane Barthel (GER)	Paula Boyle (GBR)	Julie Lamarre (SWE)

==== RS Aero 9 ====
Year	Gold	Silver	Bronze
2016	Richard Watsham (GBR)	Ben Rolfe (GBR)	Matt Thursfield (GBR)
2019	Greg Bartlett (GBR)	Liam Willis (GBR)	Chris Larr (GBR)
2022	Peter Barton (GBR)	Chris Larr (GBR)	Ben Charnley (GBR)
2024	Ben Flower (GBR)	Peter Barton (GBR)	Eric Wahlberg (SWE)
2025	Ben Flower (GBR)	Rory Cohen (GBR)	Timothy Woodcock (FRA)

=== North American Championship ===
==== RS Aero 5 ====
===== Male =====
Year	Gold	Silver	Bronze
2019	Yannick Gloster (USA)		
2021	Jacques Kerrest (USA)		

===== Female =====
Year	Gold	Silver	Bronze
2019	Catherine Gloster (USA)		
2021	Cynthia Griffith (USA)		
2022	Caroline Young (USA)	Christine Barbour (USA)	Emily Wagner (USA)
2023	Sally Sharp (USA)	Carrie Hatfield (USA)	Joan Lucas (USA)
2024	Robyn Ratcliffe (USA)	Melissa Hale (USA)	Courtney Clamp (USA)
2025	Trin Ollinger (USA)		

==== RS Aero 6 ====
===== Male =====
Year	Gold	Silver	Bronze
2023	Hank Saurage (USA)	Philip Myerson (USA)	Jacques Kerrest (USA)
2025	Hank Saurage (USA)	Andy Mack (USA)	

===== Female =====
Year	Gold	Silver	Bronze
2023	Anne Kochendorfer (USA)		

==== RS Aero 7 ====
===== Male =====
Year	Gold	Silver	Bronze	Source
2017	Hank Saurage (USA)	Eric Aker (USA)	David Solnick (USA)	
2018	Hank Saurage (USA)	Robert Patterson (USA)	Pete Gregory (USA)	
2019	Dalton Bergan (USA)	Stephen Cockerill (USA)	Andy Mack (USA)	
2021	Ricky Welch (USA)	Hank Saurage (USA)	Eugene Schmitt (USA)	
2022	Ricky Welch (USA)	Callen Burnett (USA)	Hank Saurage (USA)	
2023	Madhavan Thirumalai (USA)	Keith Hammer (USA)	Eugene Schmidt (USA)	
2024	Dan Falk (USA)	Jay Renehan (USA)	Keith Hammer (USA)	
2025	Eugene Schmidt (USA)	Philip Myerson (USA)	Michael Gavin (USA)	

===== Female =====
Year	Gold	Silver	Bronze
2017	Melissa Solnick (USA)		
2019	Jen Morgan Glass (USA)	Ashley Kenny (USA)	Molly Jackson (USA)
2021	Anne Kochendorfer (USA)		
2022	Melissa Solnick (USA)	Cynthia Griffith (USA)	
2025			

==== RS Aero 9 ====
Year	Gold	Silver	Bronze
2017	Marc Jacobi (USA)	Madhavan Thirumalai (USA)	J.C. Raby (USA)
2018	Jay Renehan (USA)	Marc Jacobi (USA)	Derek Bottles (USA)
2019	Marc Jacobi (USA)	Dan Falk (USA)	Derek Bottles (USA)
2021	Marc Jacobi (USA)	Bob Hodges (USA)	Robert Patterson (USA)
2022	Madhavan Thirumalai (USA)	Eugene Schmidt (USA)	Jim Myers (USA)
2023	Boris Mezhibovskiy (USA)	Dylan Williams (USA)	James Dodwell (USA)
2025	Marc Jacobi (USA)	Madhavan Thirumalai (USA)	Zak Fanberg (USA)

== See also ==
- RS Aero World Championships
- RS Aero European Championships
- List of sailing boat types
