= 16ft Skiff =

Class of sailing dinghy

Development
- Designer: Craig Hughes - One Design Hull
- Location: Australia
- Design: High Performance Skiff

Boat
- Crew: 3
- Trapeze: 2

Hull
- Type: Skiff
- Construction: Carbon Fibre Reinforced Polymer
- Hull weight: 74 kg (163 lb)

Rig
- General: 2
- Mast height: 7 m (23 ft)

Sails
- General: 3
- Spinnaker area: 45 m^{2} (480 sq ft)
- Upwind sail area: 22 m^{2} (240 sq ft)
- Total sail area: 67 m^{2} (720 sq ft)

A 16 ft Skiff is a class of three-person sailing dinghy with twin trapezes and a large asymmetrical spinnaker. The class is unique to Australia, where it is one of the most popular boats sailing with 75 boats registered in 7 clubs. The class has the largest fleet of high performance skiffs on the east coast of Australia. Due to the nature of only allowing two trapezes, the age of the sailors can vary between 15 and 60 years old, making it a versatile class of boat.

== Construction ==
The hull (one design), spars and foils are all constructed out of a carbon composite reinforced polymer. Manufacturers of these hulls are generally local boat builders, however are now being sourced overseas. The total weight of the boat is no more than 85 kg fully rigged, resulting in an extremely high sail area to weight ratio.

== History ==
The class has been around for over a century and has changed significantly since its beginnings:

1901

Class founded in Balmain

1908
Class expands to Queensland

1922
Class spreads to Western Australia

1976
Rules change to allow any material for hull

1986
Three man crew introduced

1997–98
Strict class rules were introduced with a one design hull by Naval Architect and ex skiff sailor Craig Hughes.

== Class specifications ==
- Overall length—4.88 metres (16.0 ft)
- Construction—Carbon Fibre Reinforced Polymer (CFRP)
- Min beam—1.52 metres (5.0 ft)
- Max beam—1.78 metres (5.8 ft)
- Min weight—70 kilograms (154 lb)
- Working sail area—22 square metres (240 sq ft)
- Spinnaker sail area—45 square metres (480 sq ft)
- Racing crew—Three
