= Swedish Sailing Federation =

National governing body for sailing in Sweden

Swedish Sailing Federation SSF
- IOC nation: Sweden (SWE)
- Sport: Sailing
- Official website: www.svensksegling.se

HISTORY
- Year of formation: 1905
- Former names: 1907
- International federation: World Sailing (WS)
- WS members page: www.sailing.org/about-isaf/mna/sweden.php
- National Olympic Committee: Swedish Olympic Committee
- National Paralympic Committee: Swedish Paralympic Committee

ELECTED
- President: Olof Granander

SECRETARIAT
- Address: af Pontins väg 6; SE-115 21; Stockholm
- Country: Sweden
- Secretary General: Marie Björling Duell
- Olympic team manager: Magnus Grävare

FINANCE
- Company status: Association

The Swedish Sailing Federation (Swedish: Svenska Seglarförbundet, SSF) is the national governing body for the sport of sailing in Sweden, recognised by World Sailing.

== History ==
The Swedish Sailing Federation was founded on 16 December 1905 on initiative from the Royal Swedish Yacht Club, after discussions had been held about a formation since 1904 by 17 yacht clubs. Among the yacht clubs at the first meeting in 1905 were the Royal Swedish Yacht Club, the Royal Gothenburg Yacht Club, Jönköpings Segelsällskap, Westerås Segelsällskap, Karlstads Segelsällskap, Söderhamns Segelsällskap, Norrköpings Segelsällskap, Lidingö Segelsällskap, Segelsällskapet Æolus, Segelsällskapet Viken, Segelsällskapet Götarne, Segelsällskapet Svearna, Stockholms Segelsällskap, and Vaxholms Segelsällskap. The first chairman was R. Öhnell 1905–1907.

In 1907, the Swedish Sailing Federation was one of the founders of the International Yacht Racing Union together with Austria-Hungary, Denmark, Finland, France, Germany, Great Britain, Belgium and the Netherlands, Italy, Norway, Spain, and Switzerland. In 1908, K. Ljungberg took over as the chairman, followed by Oscar Holtermann 1909—1921. In 1915, the Swedish Sailing Federation, the Royal Danish Yacht Club and Royal Norwegian Yacht Club founded the Scandinavian Yacht Racing Union. From 1922 to 1937, Rolf von Heidenstam was the chairman of the federation.

In the first half of the 20th century, yacht clubs were also affiliated to more local federations, e.g. Mälarens Seglarförbund, Hanöbuktens Seglarförbund, Ostkustens Seglarförening, Saltsjöns Seglarförbund, Vänerns Seglarförbund, and Vätterns Seglarförbund, that were not associated with the Swedish Sailing Federation.

In 1960, the Swedish Sailing Federation joined the Swedish Sports Confederation; in the same meeting Gudmund Silfverstolpe was elected chairman of the federation.

In 2004, Stefan Rahm was appointed secretary-general. Later in the year, Magnus Grävare was appointed national team coach for after Björn Johansson. The following year, the senior national team, the development national team and the youth national team was merged into one team.

In 2016, Anders Selling was elected chairman of the federation. In 2017, Marie Björling Duell was appointed secretary-general after Rahm. In 2021, Olof Granander was elected chairman.

== Classes ==
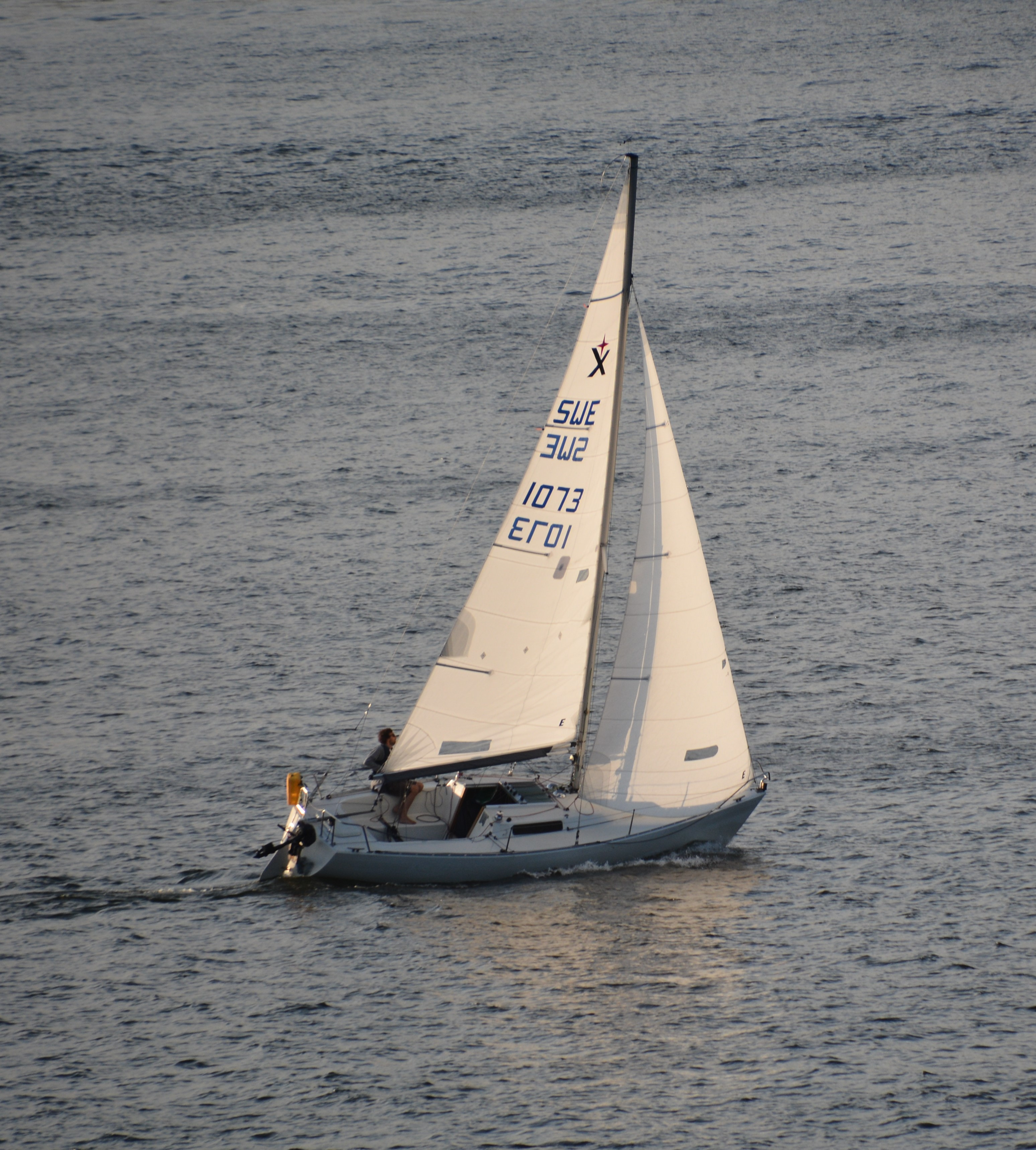
Albin Express in 2020

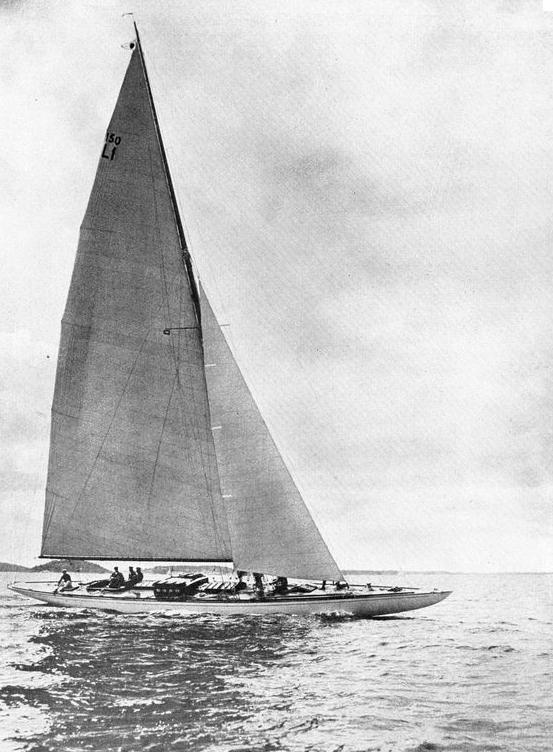
150 m^{2} skerry cruiser Singoalla in 1922

The following class organisations are affiliated to the Swedish Sailing Federation:

- 11:Metre One Design
- 2.4 Metre
- 29er, 49er, and 49er FX
- 420
- 470
- 5 Metre
- 505
- 6 Metre
- Accent 26
- Albin Express
- Albin Vega
- Ballad 30
- Beneteau and Jeanneau boats
- C 55
- Carrera Helmsman
- CB 66 Racer
- Contrast (33, 345, 36/362, and 400)
- Cumulus 28
- DF (65 and 95)
- Dragon
- Europe
- Fareast 28R
- Finn
- Formula 18
- H-boat
- IF-boat
- ILCA (4, 6, and 7)
- J/24
- J/70
- Jolly-Scott
- kiteboarding classes
- Kona One
- Mälar (15, 22, 25, and 30)
- Maxi Racer
- Melges 24
- Monark 606
- Moth
- multihulls
- Neptunkryssare
- Nordic Folkboat
- Nordisk Familjebåt
- Nova 33
- offshore sailing
- OK
- Omega 42
- One Metre
- Optimist
- RB 111
- RC Laser
- Rival 22
- RJ 85
- RS (Aero, Feva, and Tera)
- Safir
- Scampi
- Skerry cruisers (15 m^{2}, 22 m^{2}, 30 m^{2}, 40 m^{2}, 55 m^{2}, 75 m^{2}, 95 m^{2}, 120 m^{2}, and 150 m^{2})
- Smaragd
- Snipe
- Trissjolle
- Tvåkrona
- Wētā Trimaran
- windsurfing classes
- Zoom 8

The Swedish Sailing Federation also administers the rating system SRS.

== People ==
=== National team ===
As of 18 February 2025

- Anton Dahlberg (Royal Swedish Yacht Club) and Lovisa Karlsson (Royal Gothenburg Yacht Club) – 470
- Emil Järudd (Royal Swedish Yacht Club) and Hanna Jonsson (Royal Gothenburg Yacht Club) – Nacra 17
- Vilma Bobeck (Royal Swedish Yacht Club) and Rebecca Netzler (Royal Gothenburg Yacht Club) – 49er FX
- Josefin Olsson (Royal Swedish Yacht Club) – ILCA 6
- Ida Svensson (Royal Swedish Yacht Club) and Marcus Dackhammar (Royal Gothenburg Yacht Club) – Nacra 17
- Johanna Hjertberg (Royal Swedish Yacht Club) – iQFoil

=== Hall of fame ===
In 2011, the Swedish Sailing Federation introduced its own hall of fame, members are:

- 2011 – Pelle Petterson
- 2012 – Marit Söderström Nord
- 2013 – Magnus Olsson
- 2014 – Jörgen Sundelin, Peter Sundelin och Ulf Sundelin
- 2015 – Göran Marström
- 2016 – Anders Bringdal
- 2017 – Sune Carlsson
- 2018 – Therese Torgersson and Vendela Zachrisson-Santén
- 2019 – Göran Andersson
- 2020 – Stig Wennerström
- 2021 – Fredrik Lööf
- 2022 – Göran Petersson
- 2023 – Ingvar Hansson

== Notable sailors ==
See Category:Swedish sailors

=== Olympic sailing ===
See Category:Olympic sailors for Sweden

=== Offshore sailing ===
See Category:Swedish sailors (sport)

== Yacht clubs ==
See Category:Yacht clubs in Sweden
