= Tore Holm =

Swedish sailor (1896–1977)

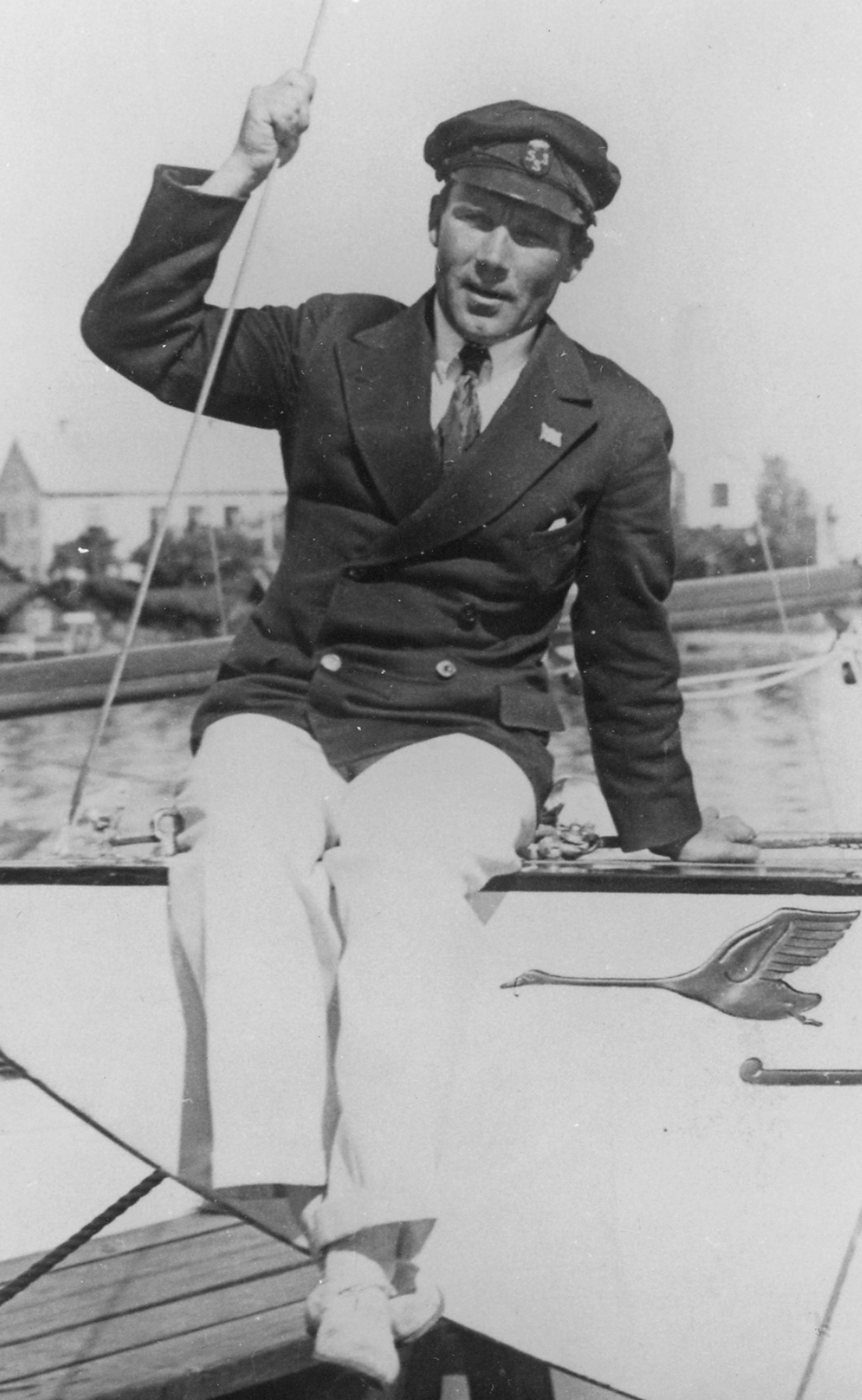
- Tore Holm on Princess Svanevit in Stockholm in 1931

Personal information
- Nationality: Swedish
- Born: 25 November 1896 Gamleby, Sweden
- Died: 15 November 1977 (aged 80) Gamleby, Sweden

Sailing career
- Sport: Sailing
- Club: Norrköpings Segelsällskap, Royal Swedish Yacht Club
- Class(es): 40m² Skerry cruiser, 6 Metre, 8 Metre
Medal record
Representing Sweden
Olympic Games
Gold medal – first place	1920 Antwerp	40 m² class
Gold medal – first place	1932 Los Angeles	6 metre
Bronze medal – third place	1928 Amsterdam	8 metre
Bronze medal – third place	1948 London	6 metre

Tore Anton Holm (25 November 1896 – 15 November 1977) was a Swedish yacht designer, boatbuilder, and sailor who competed in the 1920, 1928, 1932, 1936 and 1948 Summer Olympics.

== Sailing career ==
He started out in 1920 as a crew member on the Swedish boat Sif, where he won the gold medal in the 40 m^{2} class and eight years later he conquered the bronze medal, as a crew member on the Sylvia in the 8 metre class. In 1932 he won his second gold medal, this time being on the crew of the Bissbi, in the 6 metre class. At the Olympic Games in Berlin, 1936, he did not win a medal after finishing fourth in the 8 metre class competition. He finished his Olympic career in 1948 on the 6 metre class with his fourth medal, and second bronze, as part of the crew on the Ali Baba II.

== Yacht designer ==
In the early 1920s, the Holm boatyard at Gamleby designed and built a number of boats in the Skerry Cruiser (or Square Metre Rule) Class. In the later 1920s and 1930s several more designs came to fruition built to the International or Metre Rule, particularly in the 6m, 8m and 10m classes.

=== Posthumous build of J-class yacht ===
In 2014 it was reported that a new J-Class hull, Svea, was under construction at the Freddie Bloemsma Aluminiumbouw shipyard in the Netherlands to an original design by Tore Holm dating from 1937. In 2015 it was reported that outfitting would be undertaken at the Vitters Shipyard. She competed briefly in the 2017 J-Class regatta at Bermuda before her headstay furler broke. During racing in the Superyacht Challenge Antigua in 2020 she was in collision with fellow J-class competitor Topaz.

== Selected list of Tore Holm yacht designs ==
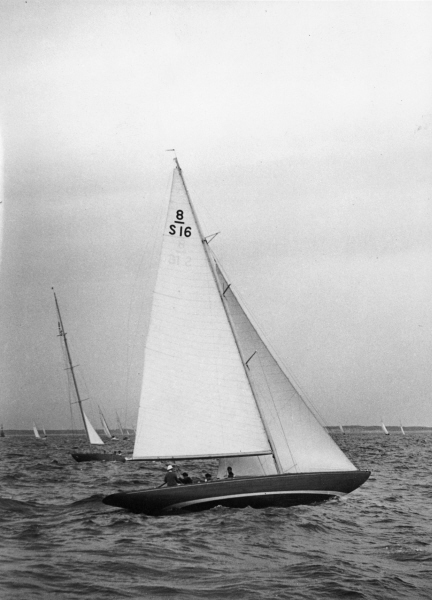
8 Metre-yacht Ilderim

Class	Names	Year ( unless otherwise indicated)
55m²	Mayflower	1919
40m²	Sif	1920
40m²	Gazell	1935
95m²	Marga IV (nowadays named Palazzo)	1921
95m²	Brit-Marie (together with brother Yngve Holm)	1921
30m²	Yrhättan	1926
5 Metre	Ran	–
5 Metre	Mystic	1937
5 Metre	Going	1938
5 Metre	Maribell	–
6 Metre	Lilian	1928
6 Metre	Västanfläkt	1928
6 Metre	Bissei	1929
6 Metre	Bissbi	1929
6 Metre	Fridolin	1930
6 Metre	Marianne	1934
6 Metre	Joy	1935
6 Metre	Marabu	1935
6 Metre	Tidsfördrif	1935 or 1937
6 Metre	Lyn	1936
6 Metre	May Be IV	1936
6 Metre	Maybe	1936
6 Metre	Fågel blå	1937
6 Metre	Fandango	1937
6 Metre	Nisidia	1937
6 Metre	Lilo-Reet	1938
6 Metre	May Be VI	1946
6 Metre	Alibaba II	1948
6 Metre	Silene III	1950
6 Metre	May Be VIII	1953
8 Metre	Elsinore	1930
8 Metre	Ranja	1935
8 Metre	Ilderim	1936
8 Metre	Wanda	1937
8 Metre (based)	Thalatta	1938
8 Metre	Svanevit	1939
8 Metre	Athena	1939
8 Metre	Atair/ Allegro	1939
8 Metre	Albatross	–
8 Metre	Zilverwiek	–
10 Metre	Zibeline/Itaka	1934
10 Metre	Gullkrona	–
10 Metre	Havsörnen	1937 (Note: According to one source Havsörnen was designed jointly with Knud Reimers, although she was built at Holms Batvarv.)
12 Metre	Princess Svanevit (together with Gustaf Estlander)	1930
70' yawl	Havsörnen II / Ivanhoe	1938
H-10	Ihana Christina	1952
