= Nordic Folkboat =

Sailboat class

- F

Development
- Designer: Scandinavian Sailing Federation
- Location: Nordic countries
- Year: 1942
- No. built: 4,000
- Builders: Folkebådcentralen; Haubold Yachting
- Name: Nordic Folkboat

Boat
- Crew: two to four
- Displacement: 4,255 lb (1,930 kg)
- Draft: 3.92 ft (1.19 m)

Hull
- Type: monohull
- Construction: wood or fiberglass
- LOA: 25.20 ft (7.68 m)
- LWL: 19.68 ft (6.00 m)
- Beam: 7.22 ft (2.20 m)
- Engine: optional inboard- or outboard-mounted outboard motor

Hull appendages
- Keel: modified long keel
- Ballast: 2,205 lb (1,000 kg)
- Rudder: keel-mounted rudder

Rig
- Rig type: Bermuda rig
- I foretriangle height: 18.04 ft (5.50 m)
- J foretriangle base: 6.72 ft (2.05 m)
- P mainsail luff: 28.71 ft (8.75 m)
- E mainsail foot: 11.10 ft (3.38 m)

Sails
- Sailplan: fractional rigged sloop
- Mainsail area: 159.34 sq ft (14.803 m^{2})
- Jib/genoa area: 60.61 sq ft (5.631 m^{2})
- Total sail area: 219.95 sq ft (20.434 m^{2})

Racing
- D-PN: 103.2

The Nordic Folkboat is a sailboat that was designed by Scandinavian Sailing Federation as a racer-cruiser and first built in 1942. Tord Sundén was hired by the Scandivian Sailing Federation to finalize the plans based on four awarded entries in the design competition. The awarded designs were done by Knud Olsen, Jac M. Iversen, Alfons Kvarnström, and O. W. Dahlström. No winning design was declared. Tord Sundén was never credited as the actual designer of the boat.

The Nordic Folkboat was developed into the Sundén-designed International Folkboat in 1967. The International Folkboat was expressly designed for fibreglass construction. The International 25 and the Olsen 26 are also based upon this design.

The Junior Folkboat designed by Erik Salander actually dates from 1929. It was originally called the "Juniors Bad" (Junior boat), but was later renamed because of its strong resemblance to the later and larger Nordic Folkboat.

== Description ==
The Nordic Folkboat is a recreational keelboat, that was initially built using wooden clinker construction. It was later produced in fibreglass, with wooden trim, with the fibreglass hull simulating the clinker board construction. It has a fractional sloop rig with wooden spars. The hull has a spooned, raked stem, a sharply angled transom, a keel-mounted rudder controlled by a tiller and a fixed modified long keel, with a cut-away forefoot. Typical versions displace 4,255 lb (1,930 kg) and carry 2,205 lb (1,000 kg) of iron ballast.

The boat has a draft of 3.92 ft (1.19 m) with the standard keel and may be fitted with a small outboard motor for docking, manoeuvring, and becoming becalmed.

Some boats have sleeping accommodations for cruising, while others have minimal interiors, optimized for lightness for racing. Cruising-equipped boats often have sleeping accommodation for four people, with two main cabin bunks and a forward "V"-berth.

The design has a Portsmouth Yardstick DP-N racing average handicap of 103.2 and is usually raced by two to four sailors.

== Design ==
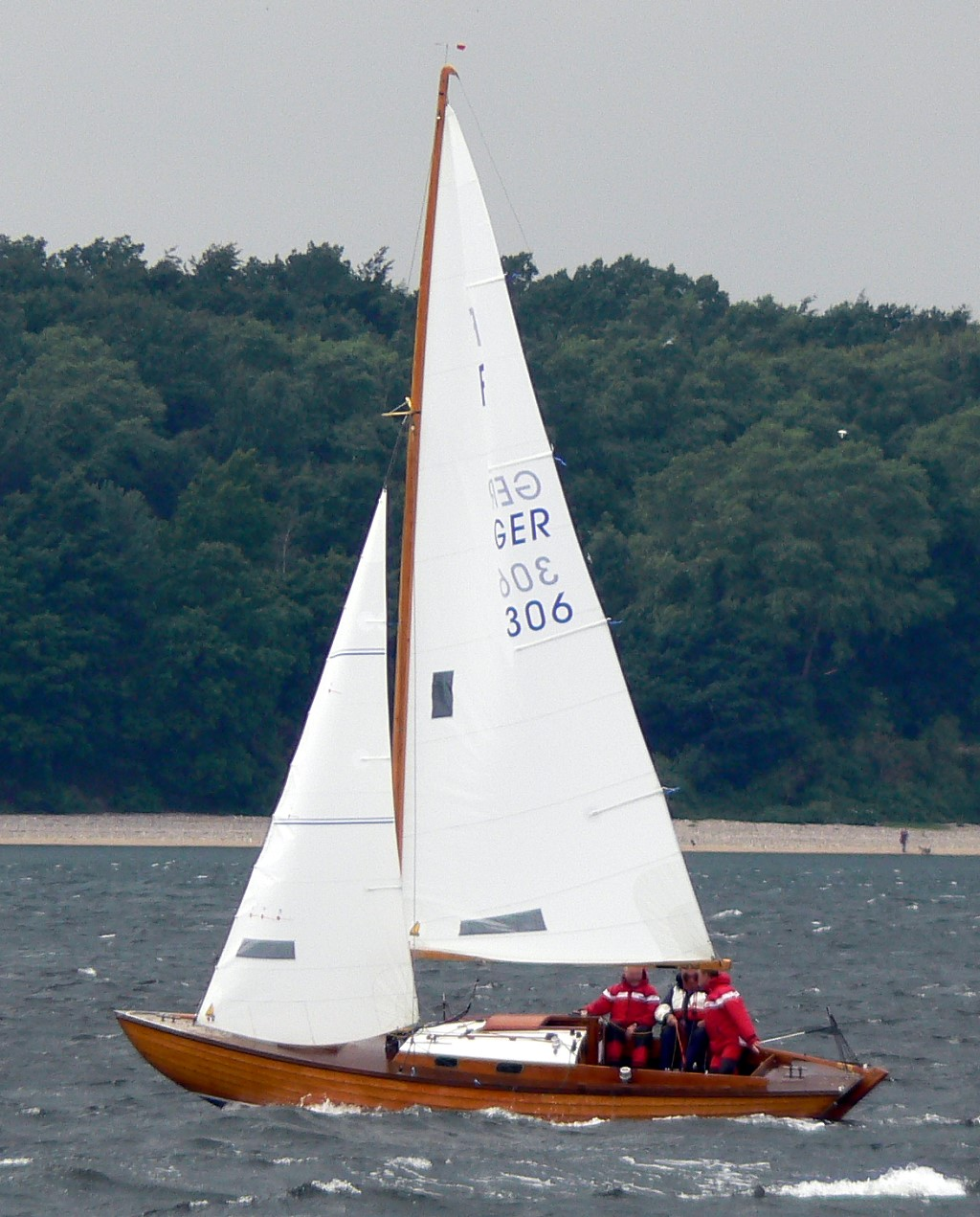
A wooden Nordic Folkboat at Kiel in 2007

In 1941, while most of Europe was immersed in the Second World War, Sweden was neutral. The Scandinavian Yacht Racing Union (SYRU; now Nordic Sailing Federation) decided to hold a competition to choose a design for a new small seafaring keelboat, with the support of Swedish shipping magnate Sven Salén.

Salén brought the question to a meeting of SYRU in the autumn of 1940, with plans further developed in Stockholm in spring 1941. Niels Benzon, Gunnar Stenbäck, Salén, Bertil Bothén, Tore Holm, Knud Reimers, Jac M. Iversen, Karl Ljungberg, and Tord Sundén were among the participants in this meeting that proposed the specifications to 18–20 square metres (190–220 square feet) of sail area, a waterline length of around six metres (20 ft) and displacement of 1,500–2,000 kilograms (3,300–4,400 pounds). SYRU launched the design competition in early 1941 with designs to be handed in by 15 May 1941.

Salén promoted the competition and it attracted 58 designs. The judges could not decide on a winner, instead naming six boats as all having some good attributes. As a young naval architect, Sundén was tasked by Salén with taking the best features of each design and drawing plans for a new boat that incorporated them all in the new design. The plans were published without a designer credited. Construction of the first boat was commenced at Arendals yard in Gothenburg in October 1941 and was launched the next spring, on 23 April 1942.

Sundén later claimed the design as his own, but the committee disagreed on that point. Until the time of his death at age 90 in 1999, Sundén was still trying to establish his claim to the credit and the royalties for the design and the matter has never been fully resolved.

== Production ==
The design has been built by a number of different builders since the first were built in 1942 using wooden clinker construction.

By the mid 1970s, timber costs and competition from modern fibreglass boats meant that the folkboat sales were dwindling. Fibreglass versions of the traditional timber folkboat were created by Erik Andreasen and Sven Svendsen. They were molded to the exact dimensions and contours of the traditional clinker hull as well as having the same weight and weight distribution. By 2001, more than 950 glass reinforced plastic (GRP) folkboats had been built.

In the mid-2000s it was being built by Folkebådcentralen of Denmark, but that company seems to be no longer in business. Today the boat is built by Haubold Yachting in Germany.

== Variants ==
Numerous variants of the basic design have been built. The hull shape was largely retained, with variants being built in fibreglass, with new cabin and deck layouts and sometimes a revised keel shape.

International Folkboat
The Swedish Yard of Marieholm Bruk commissioned the original designer Tord Sundén to redesign the boat for fibreglass construction. The International Folkboat appeared in 1969 and became known in Europe as the Marieholm IF Boat. Fibreglass construction was used to create a more graceful profile, more interior space and a larger sail area was added for better light air performance.

Marieholm 26
A modification of the IF boat, the Marieholm 26 was also designed Tord Sundén and built by Marieholm Boats between 1976 and 1987. A further modification was the Marieholm 261 which was produced by Marieholm from 1982 to 2002 and featured a slightly wider beam.

Contessa 26
A British folkboat variant, the Contessa 26 was drawn in 1965 by Jeremy Rodgers, who had built Folkboats for a number of years, and David Sadler. They took the classic Folkboat, modified the keel, added more sail area forward for better racing performance, changed the layout and deck structure, and built it from fiberglass instead of wood.

Stella
Designed by the yacht designer Kim Holman in 1959, the Stella was made to the requirements of a customer who had seen the Nordic Folkboat. He thought that the English east coast needed a similar vessel, but modified for the North Sea, as opposed to Baltic conditions and also a competitive handicap racer.

== Operational history ==
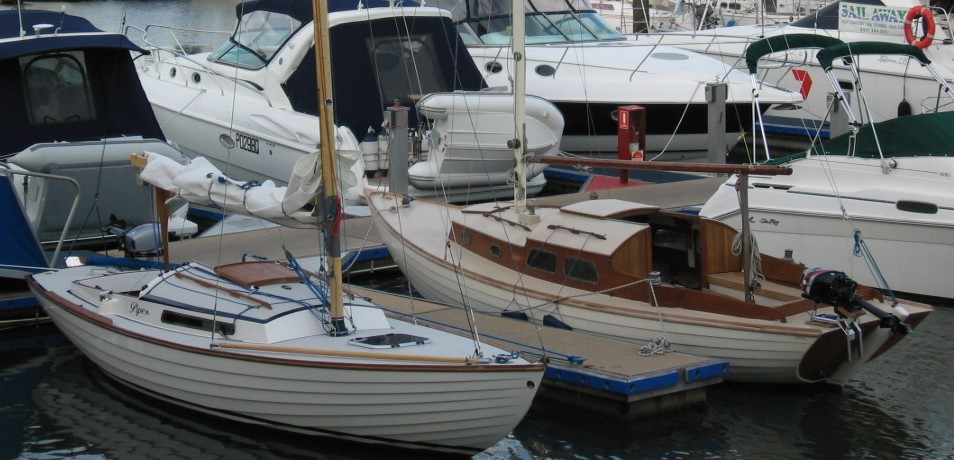
A fibreglass and a wooden Nordic Folkboat

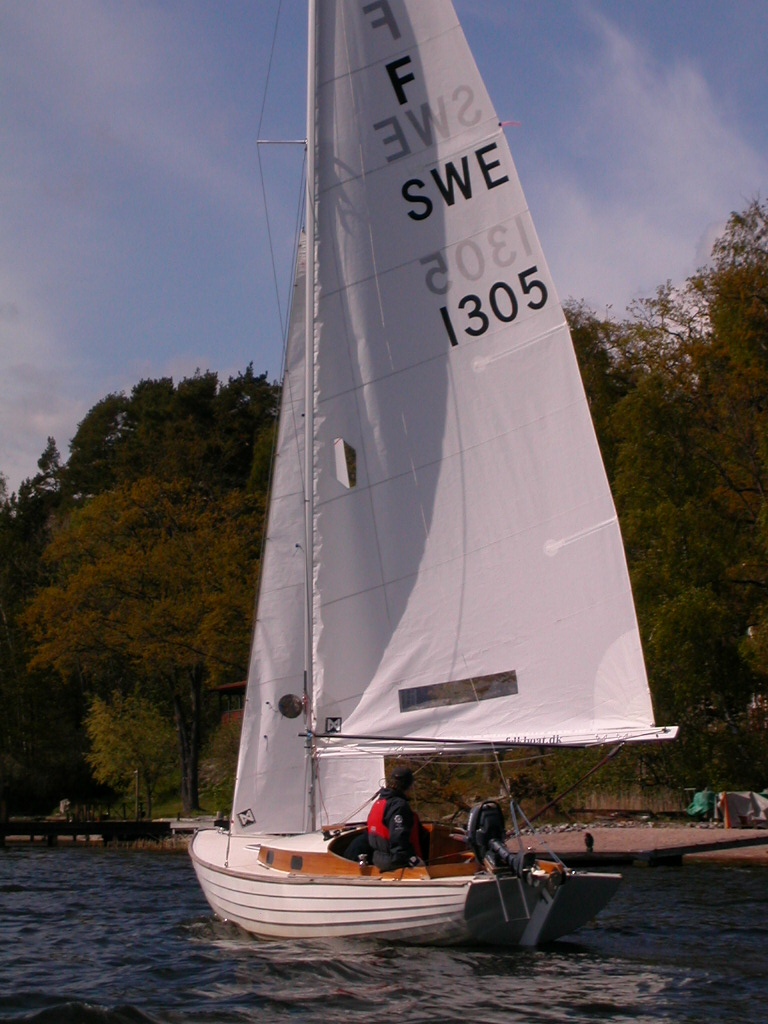
Nordic Folkboat

The boat is supported by an active class club that organizes racing events, the Nordic Folkboat International Association. It has national branches in Sweden, Denmark, Germany and Australia. There are also fleets in Finland, Latvia, Estonia and the San Francisco Bay area of the United States. In 1994, 110 boats were reportedly being sailed in the US.

In a 1994 review Richard Sherwood wrote, "the boat is noted for its seaworthy character. With an iron keel, it has raced in winds of 40 knots and often carries full sail in 20–25. Most boats have two bunks, and perhaps a vee-berth forward, with camping gear used for cooking. There are lockers. The interiors are apt to vary widely, with some minimized for racing, and others adapted for cruising."

A review in Classic Boat magazine by Steffan Meyric-Hughes wrote, "it has been described as a nautical Volkswagen Beetle. It has been hailed as a rare example of a good thing designed by a committee. But it's more: the Folkboat is the most popular, successful and influential sailing yacht of all time. It comes in various guises and has spawned several derivatives, but the Nordic Folkboat is the original."

A review by Theo Rye in Classic Boat said, "she has seakindly manners that punch far above her modest weight, and her deep cockpit and nicely balanced feel on the helm all add up to a simple but satisfying boat to really sail."

Practical Sailor magazine described the boat in 2010, saying, "the Nordic Folkboat, a clinker-built sloop with a reverse transom, a spoon bow, and a low cabin that gave it simple but pretty lines. Its long keel, slack bilges, barn-door rudder, and hefty ballast ratio (just over 50 percent) equipped it for North Sea adventures. The cockpit however—because it was not self-bailing—raised the risk quotient for any offshore ambitions. The 7/8-fractional rig gave it a conservative sail-area displacement ratio of 16.28. The length-to-beam ratio was just under 3.5. The four-foot draft appealed to the shoalwater challenged. Headroom was ideal for those wonderful creatures of Scandinavian folklore: elves."

Dieter Loibner described the boat in Soundings in 2017 as "a descendant of the sturdy Viking ships, a wind's bride that knows how to handle Erasmus' moods".

Danish sailor, Paul Elvstrøm, said "At first nobody seemed to like them. It took a while for people to figure out how seaworthy these boats actually are and how well they perform when it is rough."

== See also ==
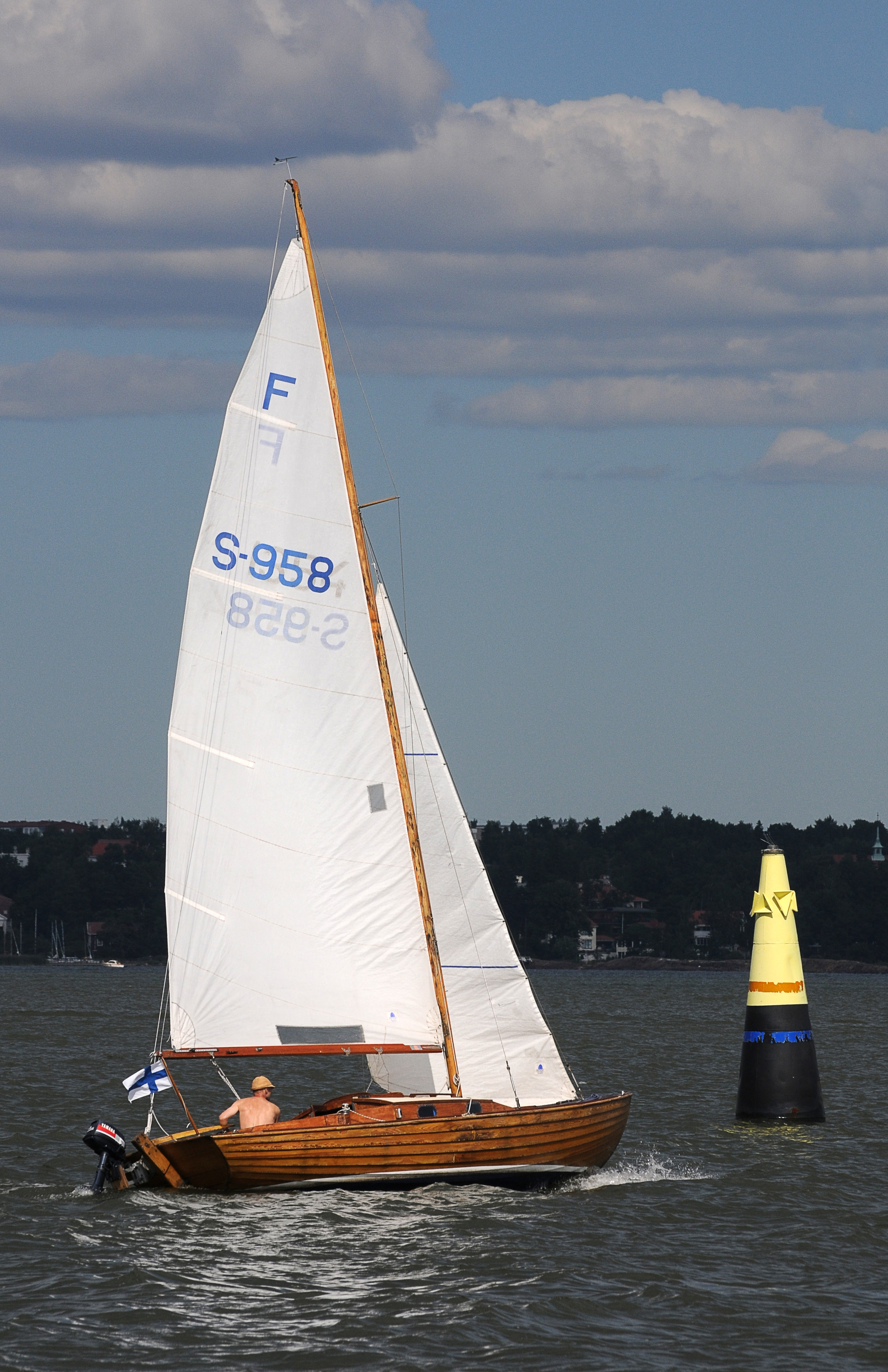
A wooden Nordic Folkboat, showing the clinker construction

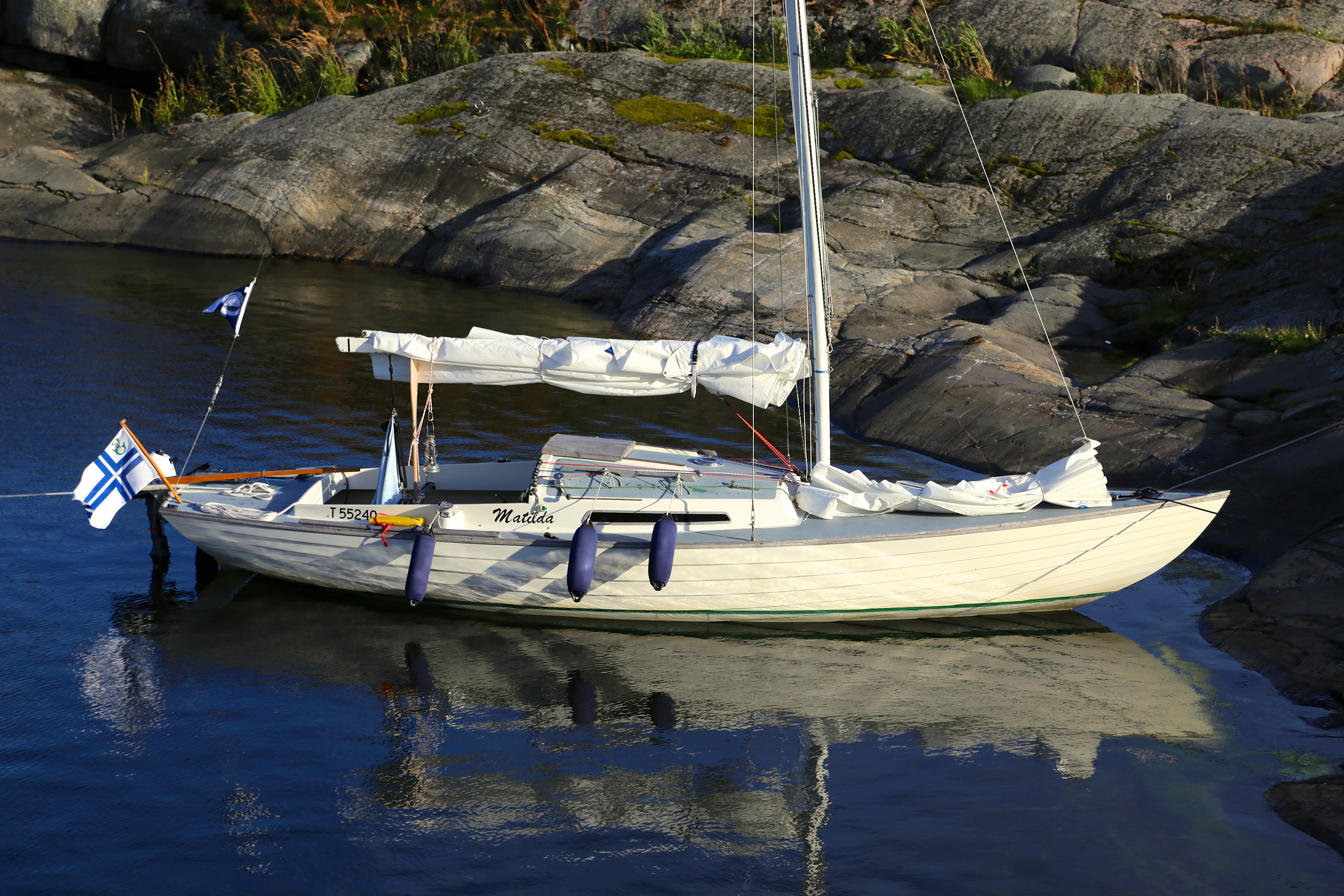
A Nordic Folkboat, showing the hull shape

- List of sailing boat types
