= Model 30 =

Model 30 may refer to:

== Firearms ==
- FN Model Model (19)30, a bolt-action rifle produced by the Belgian Fabrique Nationale
- Fucile Mitragliatore Breda modello 30, a light machine gun that was the standard of the Royal Italian Army during World War II
- Remington Model 30, a bolt-action sporting rifle
- Smith & Wesson Model 30, a double-action revolver
- Winchester model 30, a semi-automatic rifle

== Other ==
- Oldsmobile Model 30, a car produced in the 1920s
- IBM PS/2 Model 30, a low-end member of the PS/2 family of personal computers
- IBM System/360 Model 30, a low-end member of the System/360 family of mainframe computers

== See also ==
- M30 (disambiguation)
- Type 30 (disambiguation)
