= Twister (yacht) =

Masthead rigged sloop, length 28 feet

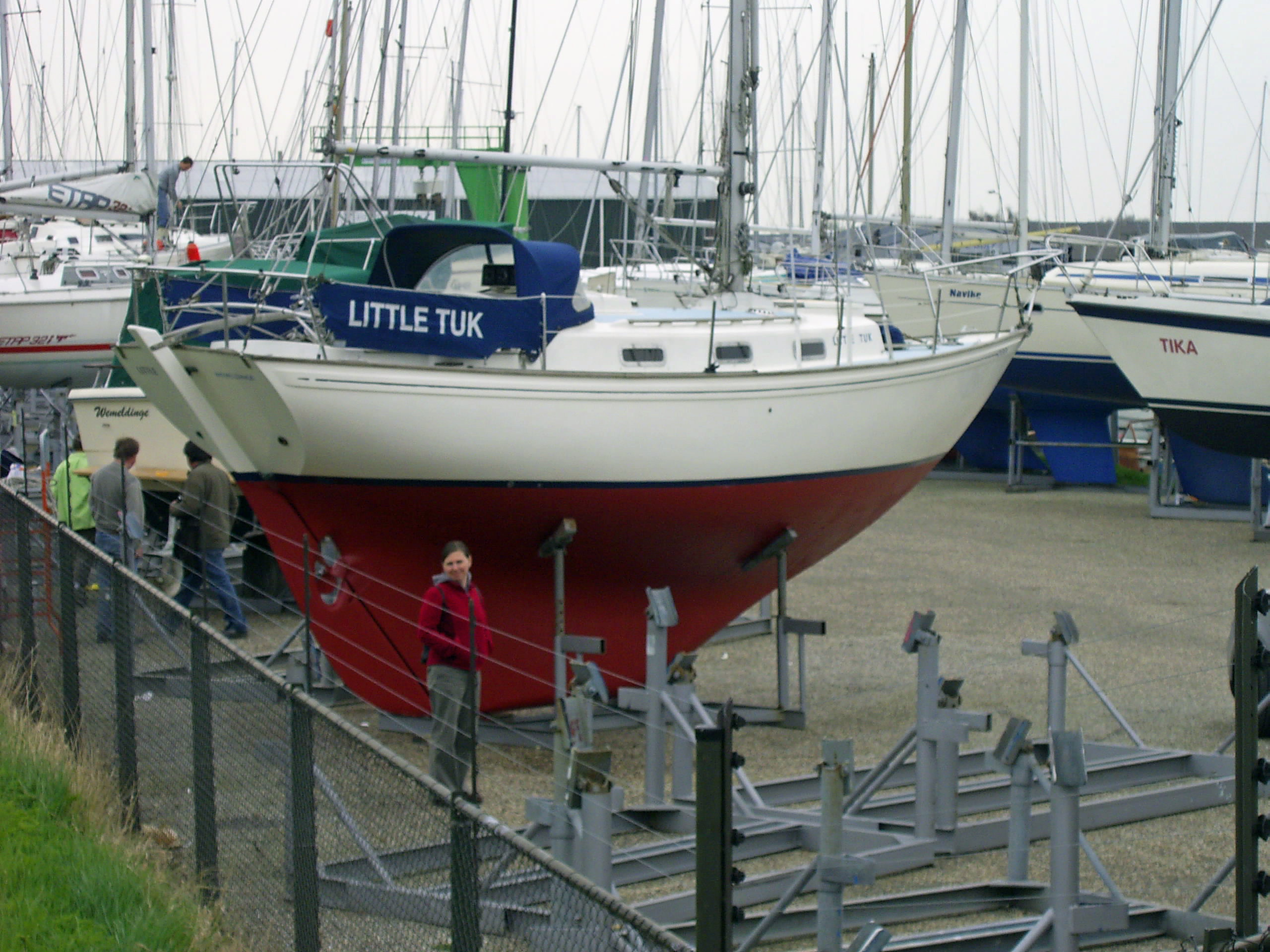
The Twister

The Twister is a masthead rigged sloop, length 28 feet (8.5 metres), beam 8 feet 1 inch (2.46 metres), draft 5 feet (1.5 metres). It has a full-length keel and a full-depth transom-hung rudder which is tiller steered. Total displacement (empty) is about 10,000 lb (4.5 t), of which 4,600 lb (2.1 t) is encapsulated lead ballast. This sailing yacht design dates from 1963 and is from the desk of the English yacht architect Kim Holman.

== History ==
Kim Holman was born in Cornwall and established himself as a yacht designer on the English East Coast after World War II. On request of one of his clients he designed a small sailing yacht, optimised for the rating rule at that time, with lines inspired by the Folkboat. The new design was baptised "Stella", and was so successful in races that several were built in wood. After a few years demand came for a yacht with the same looks, but with more length, space and seaworthiness, while still keeping the same rating as the Stella. Holman met this challenge and called his design "Twister", because he felt he had advantageously 'twisted' the rules for measurement of racing yachts, which are used to define their handicap when racing. The name also reflected a popular dance of those days. In her first year, the original Twister "Twister of Mersea" won almost all her races on the East Coast racing circuit. As a result of this many Twisters were built in the following months and years. The early Twisters were built in wood, later with a GRP hull (composite) and finally a large series in GRP. More than 200 Twisters were built until production stopped in the early eighties.

== Current use ==
Most Twisters nowadays are used for cruising, and although they generally have bunks for four crew, they provide ample, cosy accommodation for two people. The Twister is a "modern classic" in which many long voyages (Atlantic circuits, circumnavigation) have been made. Most of them have their homeport in the U.K. or Ireland but they are found around the world. There is an active Twister Class Association with a frequently used website.
