= Tord Sundén =

Swedish engineer and yacht designer

Arne Tord Sundén (29 June 1909 – 26 August 1999) was a Swedish engineer and yacht designer who drafted the plans for the original Nordic Folkboat but was never credited with the actual design despite a lifetime of legal challenges.

== Early life ==
Sunden grew up in Gothenburg. He became interested in sailing early on and became a junior member of the Royal Gothenburg Yacht Club. He trained as a shipbuilder at Chalmers University of Technology.

== Career ==
Following training at Chalmers University of Technology, Sundén worked as a structural engineer with the Swedish shipbuilding company Eriksbergs Mekaniska Verkstads AB in Gothenburg during the 1940s. In his spare time, he designed sailboats, including a 6 Metre yacht for the shipowner Sven Salén. and in the late 1940s he worked for a shipping company as an inspector; this entailed travelling around Europe and overseeing the maintenance of the company's fleet of ships. Sunden did not design boats during this period but took up design again in the mid-50s. Works from this period included the King's Cruiser and the IF boat. Following the success of the IF boat, he started his own boat construction company. He was also a partner in a Finnish shipyard.

=== Nordic Folkboat controversy ===
In 1941, the Scandinavian Yacht Racing Union organized a design competition for a small cruising sailboat that was cheap, easy to sail, and fun to race. There were 58 entrants, of which six were awarded prizes, but no winner was announced. Swedish sailor and shipping magnate Sven Salén invited Sundén to amalgamate the prize winning designs into one design and that became known as the Nordic Folkboat. It seems clear that Sundén drew the lines of the Folkboat, however the committee that commissioned and oversaw the process claimed ownership. Sundén launched numerous lawsuits seeking credit and royalties until his death in 1999.

=== Further designs ===
In addition to the disputed Nordic Folkboat, Sundén designed the International Folkboat (known also as the IF boat) in 1966 for Marieholms bruk in Marieholm, and in 1976 the Marieholm 26, a refinement of the International Folkboat. There were also further designs for other shipyards including the King's Cruiser 28 for Örnmaskiner.

== Designs ==
Yachts designed by Tord Sundén
Model	LOA	First Built
Nordic Folkboat	25.20 ft / 7.68 m	1942
King's Cruiser 28	28.00 ft / 8.53 m	1955
Pacific Clipper	25.00 ft / 7.62 m	1956
Frisco Flyer	25.00 ft / 7.62 m	1957
Offshore 26 (Cheoy Lee)	25.58 ft / 7.80 m	1957
Walton 25	25.25 ft / 7.70 m	1961
Frisco Flyer III	25.08 ft / 7.64 m	1964
International Folkboat	25.83 ft / 7.87 m	1967
King's Cruiser 29	28.50 ft / 8.69 m	1968
Sunwind 20	19.68 ft / 6.00 m	1970
Marieholm 32	32.00 ft / 9.75 m	1974
Marieholm 26	26.25 ft / 8.00 m	1976
Sunwind 31	30.64 ft / 9.34 m	1977
Sunwind 26	25.59 ft / 7.80 m	1978
Marieholm 261	26.25 ft / 8.00 m	1982
Sunwind 27	26.97 ft / 8.22 m	1982
Sunwind 33	32.91 ft / 10.03 m	1983
Sunwind 311	30.74 ft / 9.37 m	1988
