= Princess Svanevit =

Swedish 12-metre class yacht

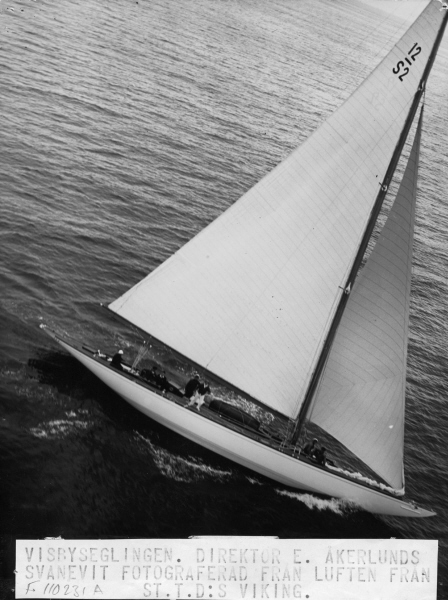
- Princess Svanevit in 1930.
- Other names: Irene; Silvervingen X Barranquilla
- Nation: Sweden; United Kingdom
- Class: 12-metre
- Sail no: S–2
- Designer(s): Gustaf Estlander & Tore Holm
- Builder: August Plym, Neglingevarvet; Stockholm, Sweden
- Launched: 1930

Specifications
- Displacement: 183 m^{2} (1,970 sq ft)
- Length: 21.95 m (72.0 ft) (LOA); 13.92 m (45.7 ft) (LWL)
- Beam: 3.57 m (11.7 ft)
- Sail area: 183 m^{2} (1,970 sq ft)

Princess Svanevit is a Swedish 12 metre class yacht, at 21.95 m (72.0 ft) the longest ever built. It was by designed by Gustaf Estlander & Tore Holm and built at August Plym's wharf Neglingevarvet by his sons Carl Plym and Bengt Plym.

== Interior design ==
The artist Ewald Dahlskog was hired for the lavish interior with unique marquetry, Dalskog's work contributed to marquetry experiencing a renaissance in Sweden. The design of the interior was characterized by the dominant art direction of the time, Swedish Grace.

== Career ==
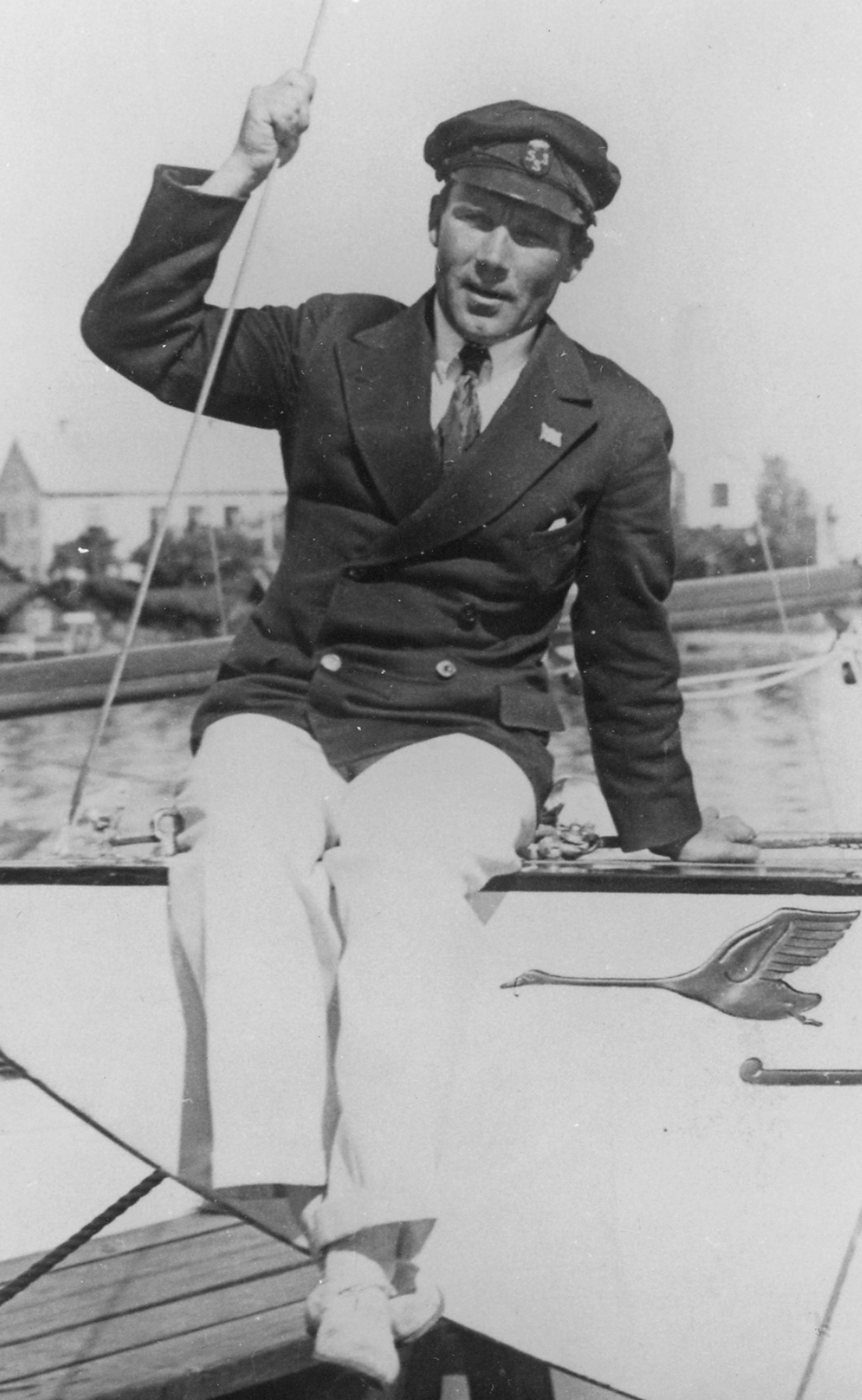
Yacht designer Tore Holm on Princess Svanevit in Stockholm in 1931

=== First owner - Erik Åkerlund ===
Princess Svanevit was launched in 1930 for Swedish entrepreneur, publisher and publicist Erik Åkerlund. The sloop was designed to be the flag ship at the 100 year anniversary of the Royal Swedish Yacht Club (KSSS). Åkerlund wanted to both attract foreign sailors in the prestigious 12 meter class to the regatta and showcase the best of Swedish boat building crafts for sailors, yacht designers and other experts from all countries. He therefore hired the foremost professionals who could be recruited. At the KSSS regatta where Princess Svanevit won the 12 Metre Class the Swedish royals prince Gustaf Adolf and princess Ingrid (later queen of Denmark] were on board.

Åkerlund was an enthusiastic sailor and owned Bissbi that won the gold medal in the 6 m class at the 1932 Summer Olympics with his son Olle in the crew.

=== Second owner - Ernhold Lundström ===
In 1935 Princess Svanevit was sold to managing director Ernhold Lundström in Malmö who renamed her Irene. Tore Holm made a few modifications.

=== Third owner - Nils Gäbel ===
Lundström sold the yacht to managing director Nils Gäbel who renamed her Silvervingen X. At age 50 he quit his job and with his family, wife and four kids, sailed his boat to Spain where he went on to found the first holiday resort in Torrevieja. A statue in Torrevieja depicts Gäbel steering a boat.

=== Fourth owner - Harry Hyams ===
In 1958 British property developer Harry Hyams became the fourth owner, renaming her Barranquilla and sailing her on the Solent with Hamble as home port.

=== Fifth owner - Stockholms Båtsnickeri AB ===
For many years the whereabouts of Princess Svanevit were unknown. In 2007 Swedish yacht enthusiast Bobby Cyrus read on an Internet forum that the yacht was berthed in England in a rather decrepit state of repair. After ten years of discussions with Harry Hyams and later his estate Cyrus managed to buy the yacht and transport it to Sweden, where it is undergoing restoration in the hands of Andreas Milde at Stockholms Båtsnickeri in Fisksätra.

=== Sixth owner - Princess Svanevit AB ===
The wharf Stockholms Båtsnickeri continues the restoration work of Princess Svanevit but has sold the yacht to the limited company Princess Svanevit AB. The shareholders of the limited company are the non-profit association Svenska Träbåtar (English: Swedish Wooden Boats) with 75%, and a British philanthropist couple with the remaining 25%.

The majority shareholder Svenska Träbåtar hopes to both bring home to Sweden a number of old wooden boats sold abroad, and find even more objects at home in Sweden. The ambition is to put the wooden boat building art on the UNESCO World Heritage List.
