= S 30 (keelboat) =

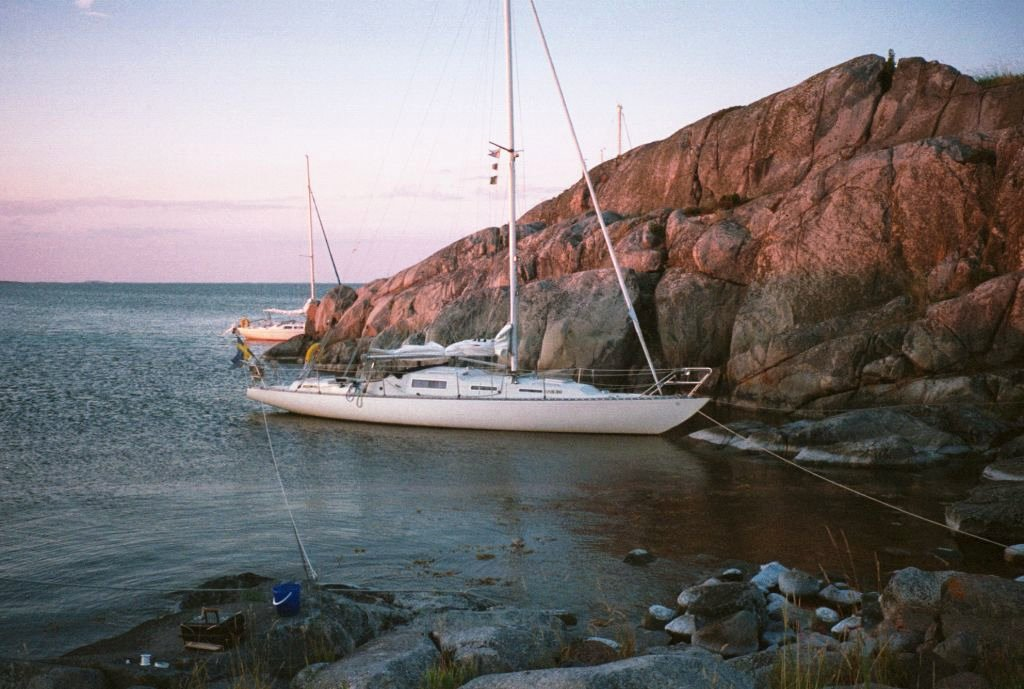
- S 30 in 2003.

Development
- Designer: Knud Reimers
- Year: 1972
- Builder: Fisksätra varv

Boat
- Draft: 1.47 m (4.8 ft)

Hull
- LOA: 12.50 m (41.0 ft)
- LWL: 9.30 m (30.5 ft)
- Beam: 2.50 m (8.2 ft)

S 30 is a 12.50-metre (41.0 ft) sailboat class designed by Knud Reimers and built in about 300 copies.

== History ==
The S 30 was designed by Knud Reimers for Göta Segelsällskap and Swedish Sailing Federation and produced by Fisksätra varv.
