= M30 =

M30 or M-30 may refer to:

== Science ==
- Messier 30 (M30), a globular cluster in the constellation Capricornus

== Transportation ==
=== Vehicles ===
- BMW M30, a 1968 automobile piston engine
- HMS M30, a 1915 British Royal Navy vessel of World War 1
- Infiniti M30, a luxury coupe sold in the United States
- M30, the pennant number for the Royal Navy ship, HMS Ledbury
- M-30, the Charomskiy ACh-30 diesel engine
- Miles M.30, British, experimental aircraft developed during World War II
- McLaren M30, 1980 racing car
- Mälar 30, sailboat class
- DJI Matrice 30, a Chinese industrial drone

=== Roads ===
- M-30 (Michigan highway), a state highway in southern Michigan
- M-30 motorway, a Madrid orbital motorway in Spain
- M30 motorway (Hungary), a motorway in Hungary
- M30 (Cape Town), a Metropolitan Route in Cape Town, South Africa
- M30 (Johannesburg), a Metropolitan Route in Johannesburg, South Africa
- Highway M30 (Ukraine)
- M30 (Pretoria), a Metropolitan Route in Pretoria, South Africa
- M30 (Durban), a Metropolitan Route in Durban, South Africa
- M30 (Bloemfontein), a Metropolitan Route in Bloemfontein, South Africa
- M30 (Pietermaritzburg), a Metropolitan Route in Pietermaritzburg, South Africa

=== Other ===
- M30 (New York City bus), a former New York City Bus route in Manhattan

== Weapons ==
- A type of US rocket used by the M142 and M270 Multiple Launch Rocket Systems
- A rocket fired by the Soviet Katyusha rocket launcher
- M30 107 mm Mortar, an American heavy mortar
- M-30 122 mm howitzer, a Soviet howitzer
- M30 Luftwaffe drilling, a World War II-era, survival combination gun

== Others ==
- Samsung Galaxy M30, a mid-range Android phone from Samsung

== See also ==
- Model 30 (disambiguation)
