= SK75 =

SK75 may refer to:

- Olympic skeet
- 75m² Skerry cruiser, sailing yacht class
