= Walton 25 =

Canadian Folkboat variant

Development
- Designer: Tord Sundén
- Location: United States
- Year: 1961
- Builder: Whitby Boat Works
- Name: Walton 25

Boat
- Displacement: 5,500 lb (2,495 kg)
- Draft: 3.83 ft (1.17 m)

Hull
- Type: monohull
- Construction: fiberglass
- LOA: 25.25 ft (7.70 m)
- LWL: 19.83 ft (6.04 m)
- Beam: 7.25 ft (2.21 m)
- Engine: inboard engine

Hull appendages
- Keel: long keel
- Ballast: 2,000 lb (907 kg)
- Rudder: transom-mounted rudder

Rig
- Rig type: Bermuda rig
- I foretriangle height: 30.80 ft (9.39 m)
- J foretriangle base: 9.00 ft (2.74 m)
- P mainsail luff: 26.80 ft (8.17 m)
- E mainsail foot: 11.80 ft (3.60 m)

Sails
- Sailplan: masthead sloop
- Mainsail area: 158.12 sq ft (14.690 m^{2})
- Jib/genoa area: 138.60 sq ft (12.876 m^{2})
- Total sail area: 296.72 sq ft (27.566 m^{2})

The Walton 25 is a recreational keelboat first built in 1961. It was sold under a number of names, including Continental Folkboat, Whitby 25 Folkboat, Great Lakes Folkboat as well as Walton 25. It was built by Whitby Boat Works in Canada, starting in 1961. It is now out of production.

The boat is a development of Tord Sundén's International Folkboat design. The fiberglass hull has a spooned raked stem, a sharply angled transom, a transom-hung rudder controlled by a tiller and a fixed long keel. The boat has a draft of 3.83 ft (1.17 m) with the standard keel. The design has a hull speed of 6.0 kn (11.1 km/h).

The boat is fitted with a small inboard engine of 6 to 9 hp (4 to 7 kW) for docking and maneuvering.

The design has sleeping accommodation for four people, with a double "V"-berth in the bow cabin and two straight settee berths in the main cabin. The galley is located on both sides of the companionway ladder, with a single-burner stove to starboard and sink to port. The head is located just aft of the bow cabin on the starboard side. Cabin headroom is 67 in (170 cm). In a 2010 review Steve Henkel wrote, "Her doghouse cabin gives good headroom for a 25-footer. [...] Low coach roof and narrow beam give the cabin a closed-in feeling."

It has a masthead sloop rig.
