= International rule (sailing) =

The International rule, also known as the Metre rule, was created for the measuring and rating of yachts to allow different designs of yacht to race together under a handicap system. Prior to the ratification of the International rule in 1907, countries raced yachts under their own national rules and international competition was always subject to various forms of subjective handicapping.

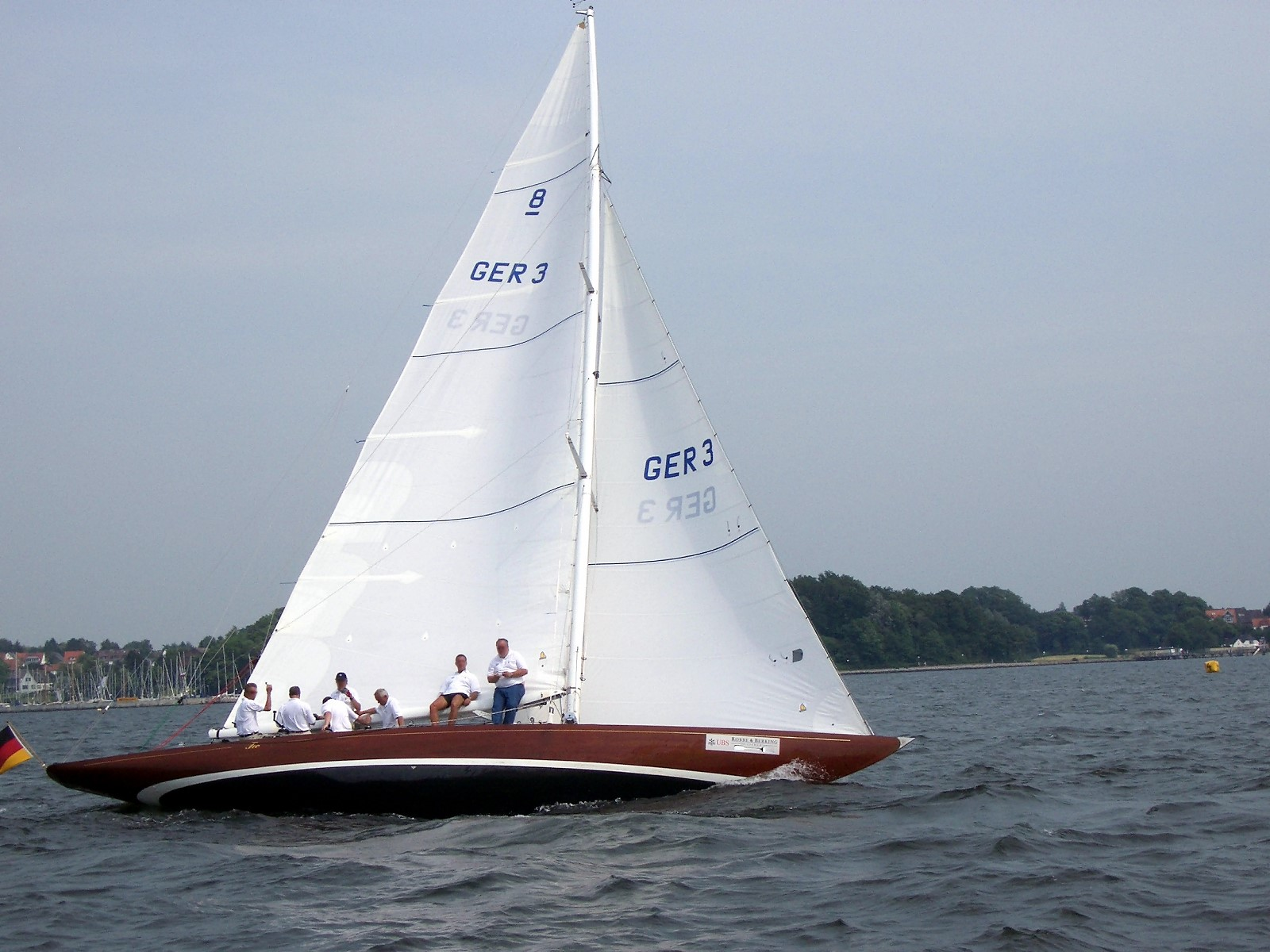
An international 8-metre boat

== Background ==
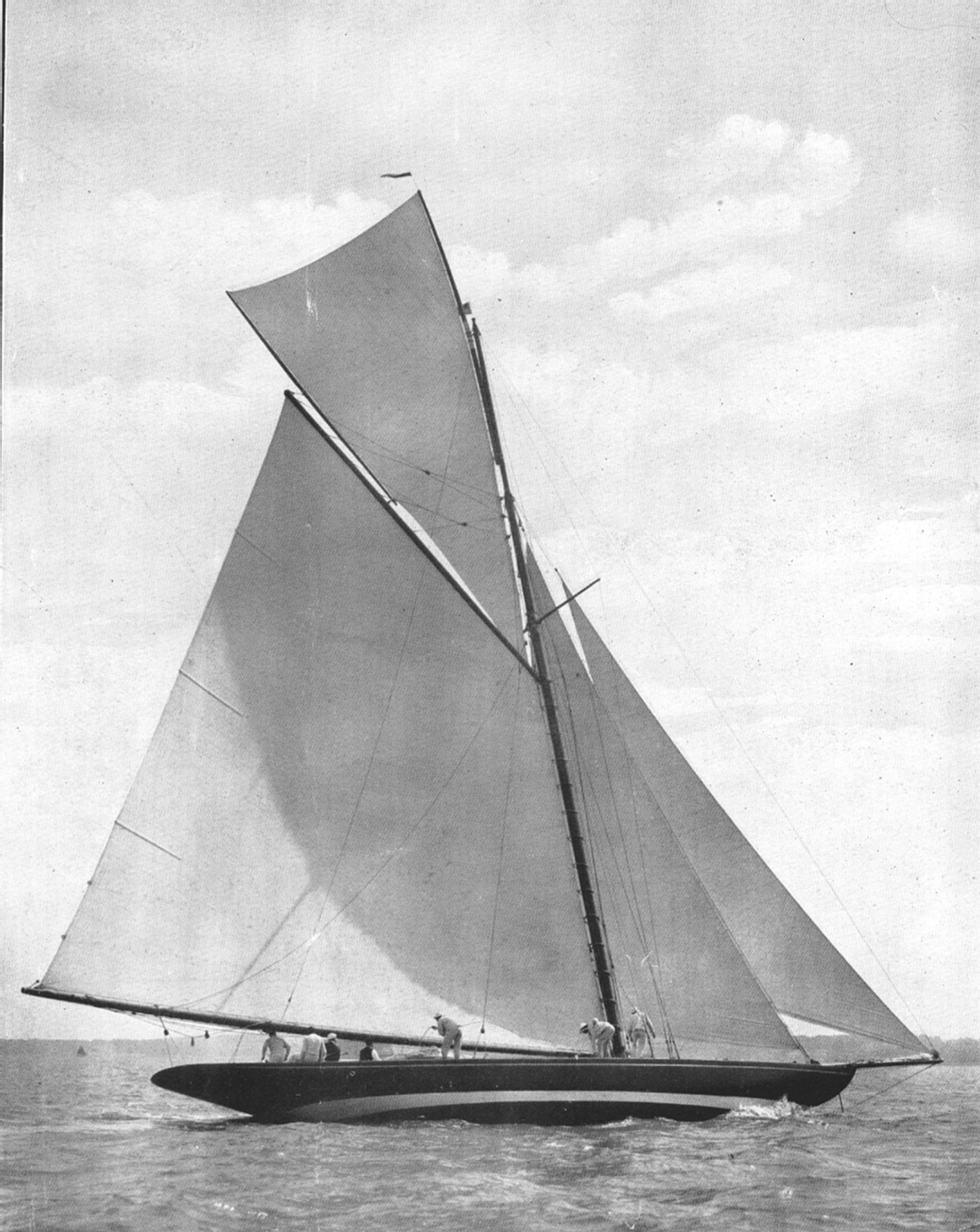
the 15mR Ma'oona in 1908

The word 'ton' and hence 'tonnage' originates from the word 'tun' which is a measure of volume equivalent to the size of a barrel which could contain 252 gallons of wine. In the UK, merchant sailing vessels were historically measured using Builder's Old Measurement to measure tonnage and taxed accordingly. Due to the difficulty with accurately measuring the internal volume of a sailing vessel with a hull of varying curvature, a set of distances at points on the hull was defined to be measured and entered into a formula which then defined the tonnage and hence the taxes to be paid to the government of the day. It did not matter that the tonnage measurement was not an exact measure of volume because all vessels were measured using the same basis which gave an equitable basis for determining tax.

This system of measuring or rating merchant sailing ships has a long, well established history, so tonnage, and the calculus involved was naturally also used to measure or rate a sailing yacht.

=== Yacht handicapping ===
During the early part of the 19th century interest in yacht racing had achieved sufficient momentum to need an agreed handicapping system to allow different types of yacht to race on an equitable basis. The method of measuring merchant sailing ships carried over into the world of yacht racing so that a yacht also now had a measured tonnage which allowed size comparisons and hence performance comparisons to be made between yachts on the basis that a properly designed big yacht will sail faster than a properly designed small yacht.

Each yacht fell within a Class based upon its measured tonnage. In the early 19th century four ranges of tonnage and hence four Classes were defined. Based on experience gained from the results of numerous races each Class was allocated a distance allowance that the Class had to give away to the next lower Class. This was equivalent to a Class 1 having to sail more distance than a Class 4 yacht during a race.

In 1834 handicapping by distance was changed to handicapping by time.

As yacht racing in particular became more and more popular designers started to look for and found loopholes in the measurement rules to enable a design to get a better rating. Whilst this encouraged designers it discouraged owners from participating in handicap racing because designs were being outdated almost before the yacht was launched.

In order to restore the equilibrium, work began on new formulas, which resulted, in the Thames Measurement which was the first formula defined for yachts.

The adoption of the British Thames Measurement by the Yacht Club of France in 1870 may mark the beginning of international rating rules. In 1893, the Germano-Scandinavian Union was formed and it developed its "Union Rule". Starting in 1902, under the leadership of the New York Yacht Club, U.S. yacht clubs agreed to a "Universal Rule" in 1905 which was based on a formula developed by Nathanael Herreshoff.

== Development of the International rule ==
=== Initial Impetus ===
By the early 20th Century yacht racing had spread across Europe but each country had its own different rating rules but they all typically used similar principles. International competition was always subject to various forms of handicapping which was often subjective and certainly open to protest

What was needed was a common rating or an agreed International rule, which would enable yachts from one country to race competitively in a different country.

The leading yacht racing countries came together and laid down a system that calculated the rating of yachts, measurement rules, construction regulations (scantlings) and rules for racing. This was largely driven by the United Kingdom. The then Secretary of the YRA (now called the Royal Yachting Association), Brooke Heckstall-Smith had been in discussion with Scandinavians German and French yacht clubs and a conference was held at the Langham Hotel in London in July 1906. Representatives from eleven countries attended, together with an observer from the United States, plus several respected nautical engineers and designers and they started to formulate the International rule.

A committee met again in October 1906 in Berlin to elaborate on the application of the Rule. The conference delegates met finally again in Paris in October 1907 and ratified the first International rule which defined not only the rating of yachts and measurement rules but also construction regulations (scantlings) and racing rules. Delegates from this meeting went on to form the International Yacht Racing Union (IYRU); the precursor to the present International Sailing Federation (ISAF).

The USA sent observers to the meetings but did not initially adopt the first International rule and continued with the Universal Rule based on the formula developed by Nathanael Herreshoff.

=== Evolution of the rule ===
The International rule eventually became the backbone of yacht racing. The Rule created a formula that took into account most problematic areas that had previously caused dissent among the racing nations. It does not restrict size—many individual classes were created. It allowed designers a degree of latitude—yet controlled unsafe extremes. It laid down construction rules and governed the use of materials—yet understood that the Rule must develop.

==== First International rule ====
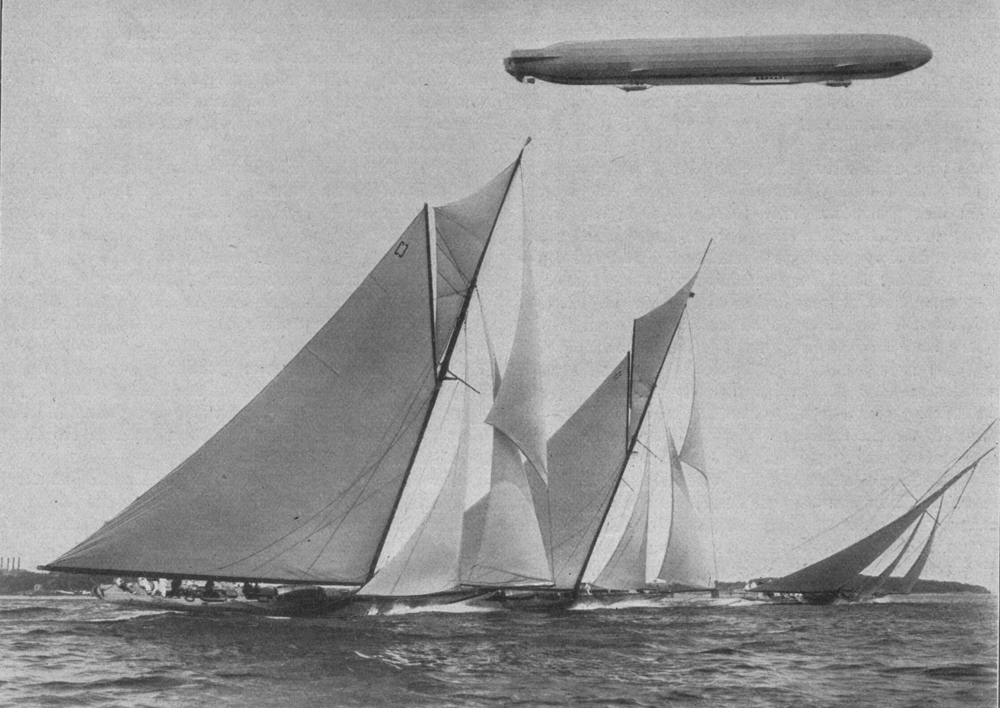
The 19mR Octavia racing with the 15mR class (Kiel Week, 1913)

Used from 1907 to 1920

$R \mbox{ metres} = \frac{L + B + G/2 + 3d + \sqrt{S}/3 - F}{2}$

where

- $L$ = waterline length (LWL)
- $B$ = beam
- $G$ = chain girth
- $d$ = difference between skin girth and chain girth
- $S$ = sail area
- $F$ = freeboard

==== Second International rule ====
Used from 1920 to 1933.

$$R \mbox{ metres} = \frac{L + 0.25G +2d + \sqrt{S} - F}{2.5}$$

where

- $L$ = waterline length (LWL)
- $G$ = chain girth
- $d$ = difference between skin girth and chain girth
- $S$ = sail area
- $F$ = freeboard

==== Third International rule ====
Used from 1933 to 1939.

$$R \mbox{ metres} = \frac{L + 2d + \sqrt{S} - F}{2.37}$$

where

- $L$ = waterline length (LWL)
- $d$ = difference between skin girth and chain girth
- $S$ = sail area
- $F$ = freeboard

== Rule forms ==
The term “Metre” does not refer to the length of the yacht; it is the product of a formula and denotes the class. A Six Metre yacht can be from 10 to 12 metres in length.

Metre rule has proven to be successful and enduring, seeing only minor revisions over the years. Whilst many different Metre Class yachts were constructed during those first heady years, three sizes have maintained their popularity; the 6, 8 and 12 Metre Classes. The year after the ratification, the 12 Metre Class were chosen for the Olympics—the 6 and 8 Metres were also used at different stages. The 12 Metre Class was used for the America's Cup events until 1987. A relatively new arrival is the one-person 2.4 Metre Class, currently active as a Paralympics class.

International rule should not be confused with Square Metre Rule.

== Why "Metre" is in the names International rule yachts ==
It is commonly believed that the term Metre refers to the units of measurement used for the input values entered into the formula. This has led to the idea that the use of metric units for the formula represented a major concession on the part of the British whose preeminence in yachting at the time could have justified using imperial units. In fact, the formula works equally well with imperial units. The relation between the length and area components of the formula are preserved whether in metric or imperial units.

The use of the term Metre refers to the unit of length (the metre) used in the expression of the result of the calculation. If one uses imperial units, the result for a Six Metre yacht is 19.685 feet. The London Conference preferred the term "Six Metre" yachts to "19.685 foot" yacht.

== Why doesn't the "number" correspond to a yacht's length? ==
For the International rule, the rating number is approximately equal to the sailing length of the hull. These boats have long overhangs which allow the waterline length to increase as the boat heels over. A displacement hull's maximum speed (the hull speed) is directly proportional to the square root of its waterline length.

The first rating rules were first expressed as the weighted sum of various speed factors such as length and sail area. Later rules included resistance factors, such as draught or freeboard. These resistance factors could either be subtracted from the speed factors or used as divisors of the speed factors. Some rules thus took the form of fractions—some "trivial", where the divisor was merely a constant, and others "non-trivial", where the divisor was a resistance factor. The Union Rule was a trivial fraction (the divisor being "150") and the Universal Rule non-trivial (the divisor being 5 times the cube root of the draught).

It was the illustrious architect, Dixon Kemp, who began the tradition of expressing British rules as trivial fractions with a divisor of "2", thus starting the tradition of the age old question:

"Since your boat is a Six metre, why is it 12 metres long?"

== Metre classes ==
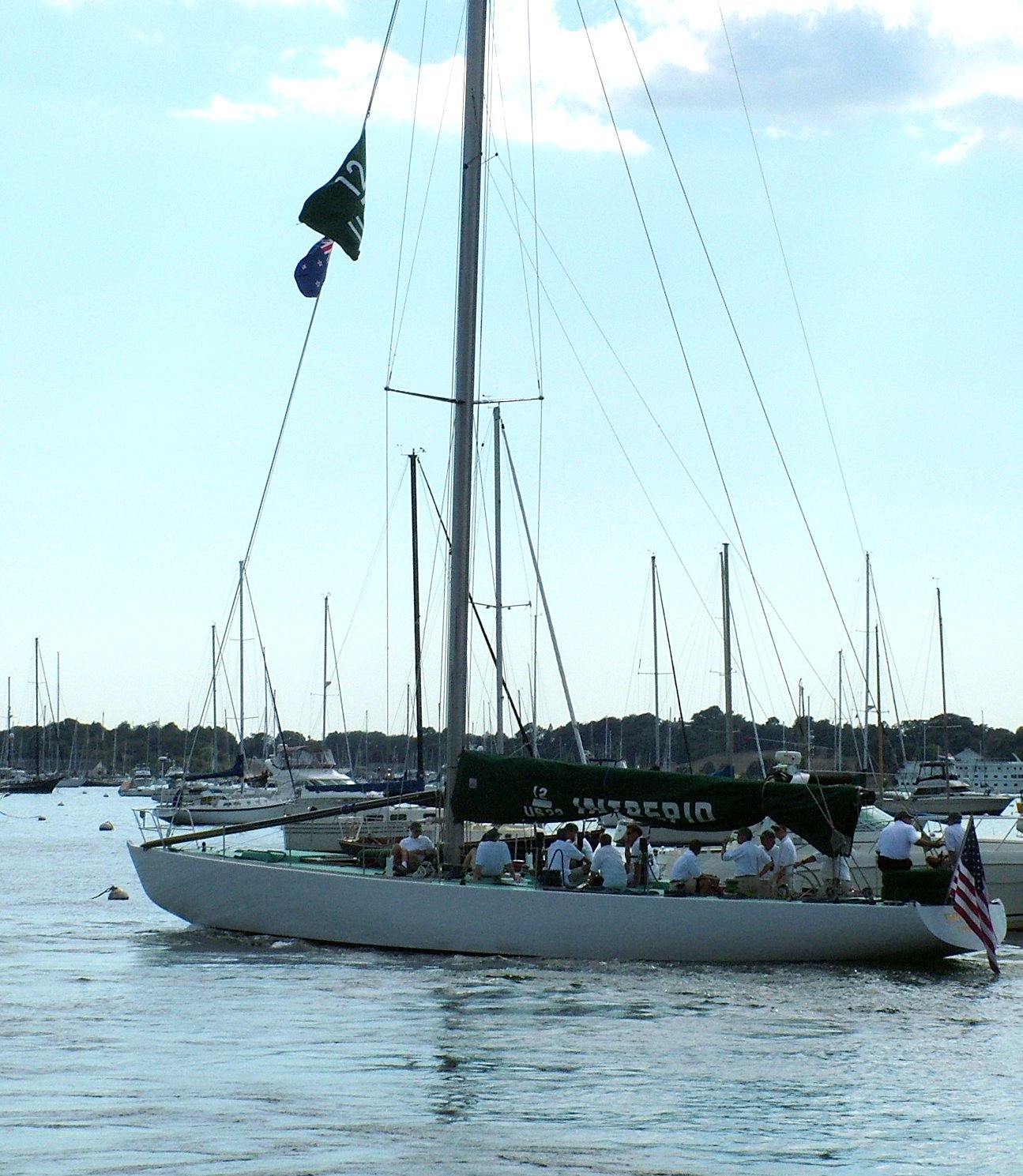
Two time America's Cup winner 12 metre Intrepid

While many different Metre Class yachts were constructed during those first heady years, of the sizes specified in the original rule, four have maintained their popularity; the 5.5, 6, 8 and 12 Metre Classes. The year after the ratification, the 12 Metre Class were chosen for the Olympics—the 6 Metre and the 8 metres were also used in different years. The later 5.5 Metre was also used in the Olympics. The 12 Metre Class was used for the America's Cup events from 1958 through 1987.

In 1936, Cornelius Shields, used the International Rule as the basis for a new one-design class. Designed by Norwegian Bjarne Aas, and modeled after his classic 6 metre Saga, the International One Design sloop, or IOD, is today raced in fleets based in Norway, Sweden, the UK, Canada, Bermuda and the United States of America. The IOD is a very tightly regulated variation of a 6 metre.

A recent development has been the 2.4 Metre Class—a Metre class boat designed for a solo sailor. As a keelboat, and unlike a dinghy, it does not require the crew to balance his weight to keep the boat from capsizing. Therefore, it has become a very popular class for the physically disabled, and is currently used in the Paralympics.

A group of Metre Class yacht owners, friends and enthusiasts celebrated the centenary of the International rule, in July, 2007, in Cowes UK, by organising a regatta for all Metre Class yachts.

=== Metre boats built and afloat ===
About 6000 of the larger metre rule boats have been built since 1907. About half of them still exist, which is a remarkable number considering that most of them were built before World War II. Partly this is a result of the fact that the R-metre boats had to adhere to Lloyd's strict scantling rules, that has given them longevity that very few other traditional classes have been blessed with.

Class	Built^{†}	Remaining^{†}
23 m	6	3 (Note: 23 m Brynhild II, White Heather II, Shamrock, and surviving 23 m Astra (1928), Cambria (1928), Candida (1929))
19 m	6	1 (Note: 19 m Corona, Norada, Octavia, Ellinor, Cecilie, and surviving 19 m Mariquita (1911))
15 m	20	4
12 m	300	189
10 m	90	20
9 m	50	10
8 m	500	177
7 m	200	30
6 m	1,500	450
5.5m	800	557
5m	350	150
4 m	172	136
2.4 m		
Total	6,000	3,000

^{†} Numbers without references are estimates.

In addition, over four thousand 2.4 m have built since the classes introduction in the 1980s.

=== Metre boats in the Olympics ===
12 m	1908–1920
10 m	1912–1920
9 m	1920
8.5 m	1920
8 m	1908–1936
7 m	1908, 1920
6.5 m	1920
6 m	1908–1952
5.5 m	1952–1968

From 2000 to 2016, the 2.4 m was used for the sailing at Paralympic Games.

== See also ==
- Square metre rule (sailing)
- Ton class
- Universal rule
