= Dagmar Salén =

Swedish sailor

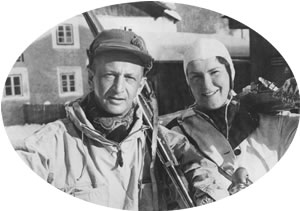
- Sven and Dagmar Salén

Personal information
- Born: 22 May 1901 Örebro, Sweden
- Died: 20 December 1980 (aged 79) Stockholm, Sweden

Sailing career
- Sport: Sailing
- Club: Royal Swedish Yacht Club
Medal record
Representing Sweden
Olympic Games
Bronze medal – third place	1936 Berlin	Mixed 6 m class

Dagmar Salén (née Mörner, 22 May 1901 – 20 December 1980) was a Swedish sailor. Together with her husband Sven Salén she won a bronze medal in the mixed 6 m class at the 1936 Summer Olympics, becoming the first Swedish woman to win an Olympic medal in sailing.

Salén was born in a noble family, and married Sven Salén in 1931. Their son Sven H. Salén (born 1939) became a lawyer and politician.
