= Mälar 22 =

9.5m sailboat class

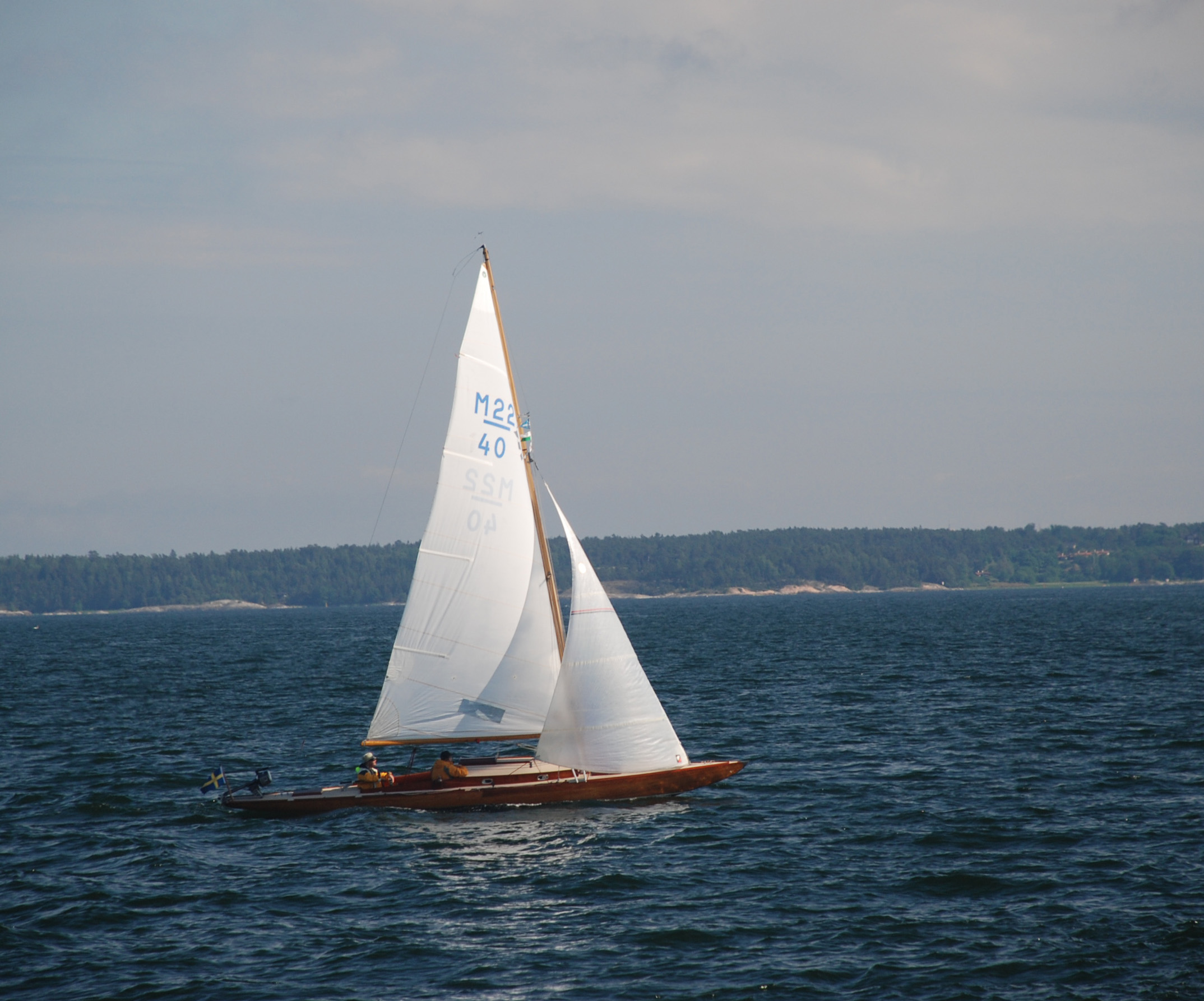
- Mälar 22 in 2007.

Development
- Designer: Gustaf Estlander
- Year: 1929

Boat
- Draft: 1.28 m (4.2 ft)

Hull
- LOA: 9.5 m (31 ft)
- LWL: 6.1 m (20 ft)
- Beam: 1.80 m (5.9 ft)

Mälar 22 is a 9.5-metre (31 ft) sailboat class designed by Gustaf Estlander and built in about 150 copies.

== History ==
The Mälar 22 designed by Gustaf Estlander won a design competition hosted by Mälarens Seglarförbund in 1929. The Mälar 22 was a response to the more and more expensive yachts built according to the Skerry cruiser rule.

== See also ==
- Mälar 25
- Mälar 30
