= Knud Reimers =

Scandinavian yacht designer

Knud Reimers (May 20, 1906 – 1987) was one of the most important Scandinavian yacht designers of the 20th century.

== Biography ==
Knud Hjelmberg Reimers was born in Århus, Denmark and educated as a shipwright in Germany at Friedrich Krupp Germaniawerft in the twenties, a yard building large sailing and motor yachts at the time. He worked as an apprentice at Abeking & Rasmussen in (Bremen-)Lemwerder under the supervision of Henry Rasmussen. His first employment was in Stockholm at the design studio of the famous naval architect Gustaf Estlander. When Estlander suddenly died at the age of 54 in 1930, the 25-year-old Reimers bought his design practice. He promptly sold six 22m² Skerry cruisers to the Detroit Yacht Club. He later drew plans for the great 75m² Skerry cruiser Bacchant (II) that furthered his reputation as a designer of fast cruisers and racers.

Reimers most celebrated construction is the Tumlare which was designed in the early 1930s (1933 from a majority of sources; No. 1, 'Aibe' was built the next year for Bengt Kinde), and became a popular class worldwide. Examples are to be found all round the Baltic, in the UK, North America and Australia. After owning the Tumlare Zara, Adlard Coles bought a 32' 'Large Tumlare' Cohoe, with which he won the RORC's Transatlantic Race from Newport, Rhode Island of 1950.

Reimers went on to design cruisers, offshore racers and numerous exclusive sailing and motor yachts. Reimers boats are available in numerous countries worldwide, and boats are occasionally still built to his designs. His drawing archives are at the Maritime Museum in Stockholm. Reimers also designed Motor yachts, e.g. Orwell Class, 25’, (Yachting World 1938) and Swedish Express, 50’, (Yachting World 1938).

Reimers was also a lecturer, and produced films of races like the Tall Ships Race, Bermuda Race, Fastnet Race and Atlantic Race. Knud Reimers argued that in offshore race sailing, the final test is to create boats that can travel at sea in any weather, and said (loosely translated): "The boat is the means to reach the treasure beyond the horizon".

== List of Knud Reimers yacht designs ==
Reimers designed numerous yachts for the metre Rule and square Metre or Skerry cruiser rule classes; they are known variously by length in metres or (more often) feet, and also often by their square metre rating etc. which together with the re-use of several names may justify this table as an attempt towards clarifying the confusing variety of naming conventions.

Year	Class or Boat Name	LOA Ft	Beam Ft	Builders Name	Number Built	Notes
1933	Tumlare	27 ft 3 in (8.31 m)	6 ft 3 in (1.91 m)	Various	"At least 200" "Some 600"	20m^{2}
1934	Scharenkreuzer 30SQM	40 ft 0 in (12.19 m)	7 ft 0 in (2.13 m)	Various		
1934	Hocco	27 ft 3 in (8.31 m)	6 ft 3 in (1.91 m)			28m^{2} on a Tumlare Hull for sailing on lake Geneva
1934	5½ S9 Blåsut	35 ft 2 in (10.72 m)	6 ft 10 in (2.08 m)	Williams, Motala		Nordisk Kryssare 5½ S9 Blåsut Similar 5.5m Nordic Cruiser here
1936	Bacchant (II)	62 ft 0 in (18.90 m)	9 ft 10 in (3.00 m)			(cf 1937 ‘Bacchante’ 42’6" given at ASQMA; cf also NMM in Cornwall);( "75m^{2}") -original Bacchant was an Estlander 30m^{2} design, 1928
1937	Stortumlare ("Large Tumlare") aka Albatross	32 ft 0 in (9.75 m)	7 ft 0 in (2.13 m) (2.3m given at)	–	No. 11 built 1939	Numerous Examples on the web; 30m^{2}
1937	Havsornen	52 ft 0 in (15.85 m)	11 ft 0 in (3.35 m)	Holms Batvarv		Seems to have been designed jointly by Reimers and Tore Holm -Built in Holms' yard and often attributed solely to him
1939	Siska	50 ft 6 in (15.39 m)	8 ft 6 in (2.59 m)	–		Knud Reimers 40m^{2} boat modified for the Sydney-Hobart Race
1941 Onwards	Scharenkreuzer S22	37 ft 0 in (11.28 m)	7 ft 0 in (2.13 m)	–		36’ given in 22m^{2}
1948	Agneta	82 ft 0 in (24.99 m)	13 ft 9 in (4.19 m)			Yawl
1940	Squall	25 ft 0 in (7.62 m)	5 ft 75 in (3.43 m)			Yawl
1955	Udell one design	36 ft 3 in (11.05 m)	6 ft 0 in (1.83 m)	Raymond Creekmore	11 in North America	Note: a one design sub-class of the 22m^{2} class named after Clare Udell Chicago YC 1953
1955	C(h)ameleon Class	29 ft 0 in (8.84 m)	6 ft 0 in (1.83 m)	Various	'2 dozen built for 1956'	cf forum on classicboat.co.uk
1960	sv:Bacchant IV	35 ft 10 in (10.92 m)	9 ft 0 in (2.74 m)	Vasteras Fiberplast	ca. 100	Bacchant III a one design yawl
1964	Bijou	40 ft 9 in (12.42 m)	7 ft 0 in (2.13 m)	e.g. I. Beck & Sohne, Bodensee		classic 30 m^{2} built in southern Germany. cf Bijou II in N America
1964	sv:Fingal 27	27 ft 3 in (8.31 m) 28’ given in	7 ft 10 in (2.39 m)	Fisksatra Varv	ca. 200	Supplied in kit form and fitted out to a variety of interior designs
1972	S 30 cf also S30-93	41 ft 0 in (12.50 m) (40’/12.3m in (???))	8 ft 2 in (2.49 m)	AB Fisksatra varv, Sweden; Crown Yacht, Sweden	'305' according to -111, built between ‘30s and ‘90s, are listed at	30 sqm The project name was originally Gota 30 which was later changed to O 30 and finally to S 30. Types A30 and S30; Sometimes Swede 41/ S30: aka Skerry41 30m^{2}/ 41ft Loa
1975	sv:Swede 55	52 ft 6 in (16.00 m) 53’	10 ft 0 in (3.05 m)	Crown Yacht, Sweden	35	designed at request of some of Stockholms Royal Swedish Yacht Club members 55m^{2} aka SWEDE 52 (52' 6" loa)
1982	Jubilee S40	47 ft 3 in (14.40 m)	8 ft 10 in (2.69 m)	Tufa Marin.	9	designed to celebrate Remiers' 50th anniversary as a yacht designer, 4 boats in Germany and 5 in Sweden. 40m^{2}
1986	SK 30/40	40 ft 0 in (12.19 m)	7 ft 0 in (2.13 m)	Jansson & Zarin	7	30m^{2}/ 40 ft Loa
1993 (posth.)	S30-93	41 ft 0 in (12.50 m) (40’/12.3m in (???))	8 ft 2 in (2.49 m)	AB Fisksatra varv, Sweden; Crown Yacht, Sweden	'305' according to -111, built between ‘30s and ‘90s, are listed at	1993 updated version of S30, with increased sail area by extending the boom and increasing the foretriangle: at this stage the original was termed 'S30 classic' -see also sv:S 30

=== Further notes regarding designs ===
Sensa is given as a 5m class; 6m designs are mentioned; a number of individual boats to Reimers' designs are listed on the Australian square metre association website, e.g. Wings 44’, 1938/ Joyous- plans 1958/ Lady in Red: similarly, Jibslist mentions the 41' Gota (original project name for the S30) and the 42'8" Scharenkreuzer 40S.

=== Further notes regarding specific boats ===
Landfall / Flicka – in April 1937, Reimers ordered the first 4 Albatross to be built by Oscar Schelin, Kungsors Batvarv, Sweden. They were finished in March, 1938. #4 was named Landfall by the buyer and shipped to Texas. As of February, 2017, this remarkable boat is 79 years old, has had 10 owners and four names; she is (2017) being restored as Flicka in Port Hadlock, Washington.
