= Universal rule =

Yacht race eligibility rule

The Universal Rule (Universal Rule for Yachts) determined a yacht's eligibility to race in the America's Cup from 1914 to 1937 and for this the J-class was chosen. Boats built according to the rule reached their peak in the large J-class yachts. This Rating Rule is intended to calculate a rating for yachts, which can then be used to calculate its Time Correction Factor (T.C.F.) in order to have disparate yachts racing against each other. The first boat said to be built under the universal rule was Nathanael Greene Herreshoff's Doris built in 1905.

Before 1914, the Seawanhaka Rule was used for America's Cup racing, and after 1937 smaller boats were desirable, and so the International Rule gained popularity in the 12-Metre Class and smaller to the detriment of the M-class and smaller and became the standard. The 6, 8 and 12 Metre Classes and from 1948 on the 5.5 Metre, were the most popular and the 12-Metre was used for the America's Cup until 1987, the last year the America's Cup was sailed in 12-meter yachts.

Yacht designer Nathanael Herreshoff devised the rule in 1902 "Herreshoff Rule" and accepted by the New York Yacht Club as the rule-making body for 1903. Herreshoff had designed winning America's Cup yachts which fully exploited the Seawanhaka rule, which was based only on a yacht's upright waterline length and sail area, to create narrow boats with long overhangs. This reached its peak with Reliance, the defender of the 1903 America's Cup, which was described as a "racing freak", suitable only for certain conditions. This prompted Herreshoff to propose a rule which also took into account the displacement of the boat.

== Universal Rule formula ==
Mathematically, the Universal Rule formula as introduced in 1903 was: $R=\frac {0.2 \cdot L \cdot \sqrt{S}} {\sqrt[3]{D}}$

Variables:

- L - Rated boat length, definition tweaked from year to year by the New York Yacht Club
- S - Measured sail area, up to 1923 to British Navy method, then amended for 3/4 mast-height jibstay and foresails, after the 1928 IYRU London Conference same as Metre-boats of the International Rule. See J-class.
- D - Dead-weight by weighing, no sails no provisions, converted by formula to the equivalent cubic feet of seawater.
- R - Rating

The numerator contains a yacht's speed-giving elements, length and sail area, while the retarding quantity of displacement is in the denominator. Also the result will be dimensionally correct; R will be a linear unit of length (such as feet or meters). Sailing craft are thus rated when their R rating falls within a certain range. J-Class boats, for example, are any single masted craft with an R between 65 and 76 feet (adjusted upward from original to allow British yachts under the International Rule to compete.

The listing for single mast boats, namely classes I through S.

- Class I: Rating = 76– 88 feet. (Skene 1941) indicates this applicable to yachts from around 1930:

Universal Rule: $\textbf{Rating}=\frac{0.182\cdot\textbf{L}\cdot\sqrt{SailArea}}\sqrt[3]{Displacement}$
where
- $\textbf{L}=L.W.L.+.5(q.b.l.-\frac{100-\sqrt{L.W.L.}}{100}\cdot L.W.L.)$
- L.W.L. = Length (on) Waterline, measured in measurement trim, in upright position
- q.b.l. = quarter-beam length, measured at the quarter-beam position of the maximum beam (mainframe)on the inside of the hull to the inside of the hull skin
- The length factor in the 1903 Formula is the Measurement Length

The yachts were divided into Development Classes

- Class J: Rating = 65 – 76 feet
- Class K: Rating = 55 – 65 feet
- Class L: Rating = 46 – 55 feet
- Class M: Rating = 38 – 46 feet
- Class N: Rating = 31 – 38 feet
- Class P: Rating = 25 – 31 feet
- Class Q: Rating = 20 – 25 feet
- Class R: Rating = 17– 20 feet
- Class S: Rating = 0 – 17 feet

Incorrect upper limits; should read 16.x feet, etc.

- The Pond Racing Yacht Marble-head is related to the Universal Rule
- The current International A class yacht retains several elements of the Universal Rule in its formulas

There were multi-mast classes too, running Class A to Class H.

== See also ==
- Square Metre Rule (sailing)
- Ton class
- International or 'Metre' Rule

Footnotes

Note: The 1941 edition of Norman Skene's book (posthumously (1878-1932)) is the most up to date outside the confidential notes of the Rules Commission notes of the New York Yacht Club. Skene was the designer of J-Class yacht "Yankee" (1930), America's Cup contender, eliminated in the last selection match, so had access to these rules.

- "New York Yacht Club", website www.nyyc.org and New York Yacht Club
- "The M-yacht", website extant?
- "J-Class Racing Association", J Class Yachts Association, website www.jclassyachts.com/news
- "J Class - Sparkman & Stephens" www.sparkmanstephens.com/yachtdesign/sailyachts/jclass_designs.php
- "America's Cup Book 1851-1983', John Rousmaniere
- "The Herreshoff Marine Museum", website www.herreshoff.org/ and Herreshoff Marine Museum
- "Twelve Meter Challenges for the America's Cup", Norris D. Hoyt, 1977
- "The Guinness Book of Yachting Facts and Feats", Peter Johnson (editor), 1975
- "Sensible Cruising designs", L. Frances Herreshoff, 1991 (contains lines of two J-class yachts)
- "Mystic Seaport Museum" www.mysticseaport.org/ and Mystic Seaport
- Several articles by "Wooden Boat" magazine on S, R, Q, P, M and J Classes. WoodenBoat Magazine www.woodenboat.com
- "The Twelve Metre Yacht: Its Evolution and Design 1906-1987", Chris Freer
- "The America's Cup: The History of Sailing's Greatest Competition in the Twentieth Century" by Dennis Conner (Author), Michael Levitt (Author), 1992
- " Olin J. Stephens II. Lines: A half-century of Yacht Designs by Sparkman & Stephens, 1930-1980.", 2002, David R. Godine, ISBN 978-1-56792-195-3.
- "Vim" a Twelve Meter Design by Sparkman and Stephens
- "Aero-hydrodynamics of sailing", Czesław Antony Marchaj, ISBN 0-229-98652-8
- "1928 IYRU London Conference"
- "Biography Norman l Skene by John G Evans", Sciences 360 www.sciences360.com
