= Stella (yacht) =

The Stella is a 'one-design' Bermuda rig sloop yacht, designed for cruising and racing by the noted yacht designer CR (Kim) Holman in 1959.

== Design ==
The design was to the requirements of a customer who had seen the Nordic Folkboat and decided that the English east coast needed a similar vessel but modified for North Sea as opposed to Baltic conditions and a competitive racer on handicap. The prototype: Stella No. 1 La Vie en Rose was built to win the 1959 Burnham (on Crouch) week, which she promptly did. The design is clinker built of mahogany or larch on oak frames.

Fleets exist in the UK (estimated 100 built during a run that continued to 1972, mostly still extant) and Australia (approximately 20 built).

== Key dimensions ==
- Length (LOA): 25' 10"
- Length on waterline: 20' 0")
- Beam: 7' 6"
- Sail area: 338sq ft (main & genoa)
- Draft: 3' 10"
- Weight: 2.7 Imp. tons
- Ballast: 1.22 Imp. tons

== Similar yacht ==
The restoration of Amulet, an amateur-built yacht similar to a Stella originally built in Fort William in 1964, is described by Bob Orrell in the book Amulet: A Charm Restored and Sailed to the Western Isles. However, this boat is not actually a Stella (this is evident from the book and photographs) and is not recognised by the Stella Class Association.

== See also ==
Twister - another Holman yacht design (latterly produced in GRP), developed from that of the 'Stella'.
