= 9 Metre =

Development
- Design: Development class

Hull
- LOA: 18 m (59 ft)

The International Nine Metre Class (9mR) is a class of racing yachts defined by the International Rule, a measurement formula used to rate sailing yachts in the early twentieth century. As a construction class, Nine Metre yachts are not identical in design but must conform to the formula that produces a rating of nine metres. Despite the name, the “nine” refers to the rating under the rule rather than the vessel's overall length; 9mR yachts typically measure about 18 metres (59 ft) in length.

Metre classes were among the most prominent international yacht racing classes of their era and formed the basis of Olympic sailing competition in the early twentieth century. Although no longer an Olympic class, Nine Metre yachts continue to be actively raced and preserved by enthusiasts worldwide.

== History ==
The 9mR was used as an Olympic Class during the 1920 Olympics. No entries were made. The International Rule was set up in 1907 to replace an earlier, simpler handicap system which was often local or at best, national, and often also fairly simple, producing extreme boats which were fast but lightly constructed and impractical. The rule changed several times in history, and only about 50 boats were ever built.

== Rule development ==
=== 1907 Rule ===
Used from 1907 to 1920

$$9.000 \mbox{ metres} = \frac{L + B + 1/3G +3d + 1/3\sqrt{S} - F}{2}$$

where

- $L$ = waterline length (LWL)
- $B$ = beam
- $G$ = chain girth
- $d$ = difference between girth and chain
- $S$ = sail area
- $F$ = freeboard

== Olympic results ==
=== 1920 ===
No competitors entered the Olympics in the 9 Metre.
