= Tumlare =

Yacht class

Development
- Designer: Knud Reimers
- Name: Tumlare

Boat
- Draft: 1.30 m (4.3 ft)

Hull
- LOA: 8.30 m (27.2 ft)
- LWL: 6.65 m (21.8 ft)
- Beam: 1.95 m (6.4 ft)

Sails
- Total sail area: 20 m^{2} (220 sq ft)

The Tumlare (lit. Porpoise) is a class of canoe-sterned (or 'double-ended') yacht designed by Knud Reimers. The design dates from the early 1930s (1933 from a majority of sources; No. 1, Aibe was built the next year for Bengt Kinde). The Tumlare is 8.30 metres (27.2 ft) overall; the design was strongly endorsed as a 'very advanced type' by Uffa Fox who was especially interested in the composite method of construction employed, with metal frames interspersed between the timber ones.

The class became popular worldwide. Examples are to be found all round the Baltic, in the UK, North America and Australia. The total number built is given variously from 'At least 200' to 'Some 600', with '660' given in Vanessa Bird's 'Classic Classes'.

As standard, the class carries 20 square metres (220 sq ft) of sail, however a variant known as the Hocco is a class with the same hull but 28 square metres (300 sq ft) of sail, conceived for sailing on inland waters, specifically Lake Geneva.

The larger sister class, the 32' Large Tumlare, Stortumlare, or 'Albatross' class is a related design.
