= 5 Metre =

Sailboat class

- Class symbol

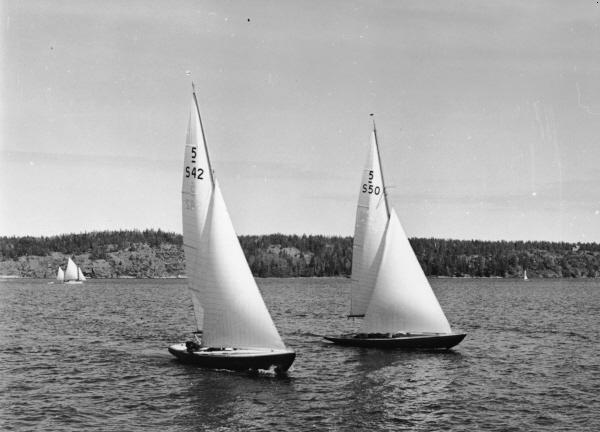
- Two 5 Metres in 1940: the left yacht is Hazard designed by Knud Reimers and the right one is Maribell by Tore Holm.

Development
- Year: 1929 (rule design)
- Design: Development class

Boat
- Crew: 3
- Draft: Maximum: 1.1 m (3 ft 7 in)

Hull
- Type: Monohull
- Hull weight: Minimum: 1,500 kg (3,300 lb)
- LOA: About: 8.5 m (28 ft)

Hull appendages
- Keel: Fixed

Rig
- Rig type: Bermuda rig

5 Metre is a development sailing class of French origin.

== History ==
The 5 Metre rule was created in France in 1929 and not an according of the International rule in contrast to other Metre yachts.

=== The formula ===
The measurement formula is given in the 2021 International Five Metre Rating Rules:

$$5.000 \mbox{ metres} = \frac{L + \sqrt[2]{S} - F - \frac{B} {2}} {2}$$

where

- $L$ = length for rating (as defined by rule 3.4)
- $S$ = measured sail area
- $F$ = freeboard in metres (as defined by rule 3.5)
- $B$ = width in metres (as defined by rule 3.6)

== See also ==
- 5.5 Metre
