= Type 30 =

Type 30 may refer to:

- Peugeot Type 30, motor vehicle by the French auto-maker Peugeot
- Type 30 bayonet, bayonet designed for the Imperial Japanese Army
- Type 30 rifle, standard infantry rifle of the Imperial Japanese Army
- -30- the end of an article in journalism
