= Skin girth =

Skin girth (SG)

Skin girth is a measurement of a yacht hull.

Skin girth is specified in some design rules to handicap or match the capabilities of sailing vessels of similar design such as the 12 metre boats. Skin girth is measured by following the surface of the hull from a given elevation on the hull vertically from a specified fore-and-aft position. It differs from the chain girth (see convex hull) which follows the skin on convex surfaces, but goes straight across the chord of concave surfaces, as a tight chain would.
