= Kim Holman =

Christopher Rushmore Holman or Kim Holman (born 28 January 1925 Carbis Bay; died 8 April 2006 Witham, Essex) was a British naval architect and co-founder of the Holman and Pye shipyard.

As a child, he sailed extensively with his brothers on the River Fal and the Helford River in Cornwall, where he was born.

He served as an officer in the Royal Navy on a minesweeper during World War II.

After the war, he studied naval architecture at the University of Bristol.

His early sailing yachts, including Phialle (his first design in 1955), Stella, Twister Stirling, etc. were sailboats suitable for regattas on the east coast of England, but also for the open sea. Some 100 Stellas were built and more than 200 boats were built based on the Twister design.

In 1961, he partnered with Don Pye to create the Holman and Pye shipyard

In the following years, he designed the Sovereign, then the Whiplash, Casino, Shaker, Centurion 32, etc.

He designed more than 70 boat plans, which were used in the construction of more than 700 sailboats; Holman and Pye went on to have over 4,000 boats built.

== Personal life ==
In 1968, Kim Holman was depressed to see boats becoming more efficient but less aesthetically pleasing and comfortable, which was very important to him. He left Great Britain and sailed less. In 1970, he suffered a stroke. In 1980, he moved to the Caribbean and resumed sailing.

He lived with Lionel Blue from 1962 to 1982, then with Jim Mignotte from 1982 until his death in 2006; Mignotte died in October of that year.
