= IF-boat =

Swedish sailboat class

- Class symbol

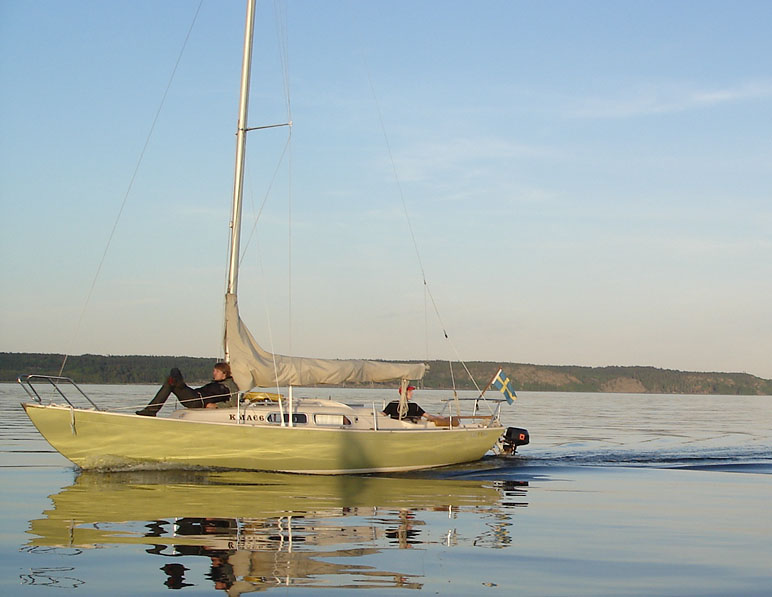
- An IF-boat

Development
- Designer: Tord Sundén
- Year: 1967

Hull
- LOA: 7.87 m (25 ft 10 in)
- LWL: 6.03 m (19 ft 9 in)

The IF-boat (previously International Folkboat) is a sailboat class based on the Nordic Folkboat design.

== History ==
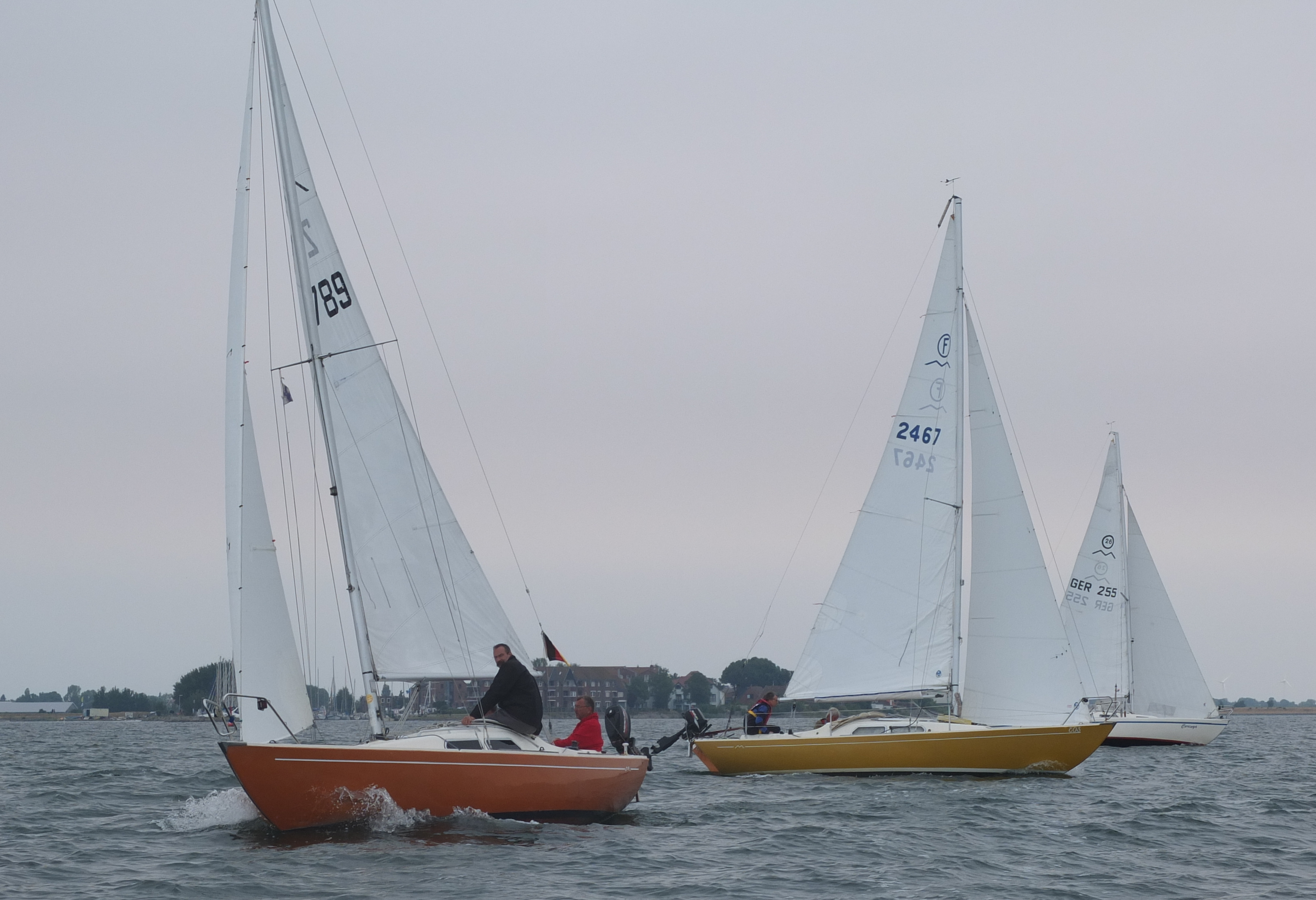
IF-boats racing at Lemkenhafen 2015

Following the success of the Nordic Folkboat, original lead designer Tord Sundén approached Swedish yachtmaker Marieholm bruk in the 1960s with the idea of modernizing, improving, and streamlining production of a new fibreglass version of the boat.

In his design, Sunden maintained the lines of the original boat but used the modern production technique to increase cabin size and sail area. Freeboard was increased to give more space below, and the bow and transom were redesigned for aesthetic reasons.

Production was started in 1967 by Marieholm, however the Swedish Sailing Federation didn't like the name International Folkboat and it was changed to IF-boat. In 1970 the IF boat was accepted as a One Design Class at the Swedish Sailing Federation.

During the period, 1969 to 1977 over 3,000 Marieholm IF-boats were built. Some are also manufactured under license in Australia.

Export took place to Germany, Norway, Denmark, USA, Switzerland and Austria. The last IF boat, with sail number 3488, was sold on December 28, 1984.

In 2018, the IF-Boat was put back into production. The new IF-Boat is an initiative of SeacamperIF from Berlin.
