= Mälar 25 =

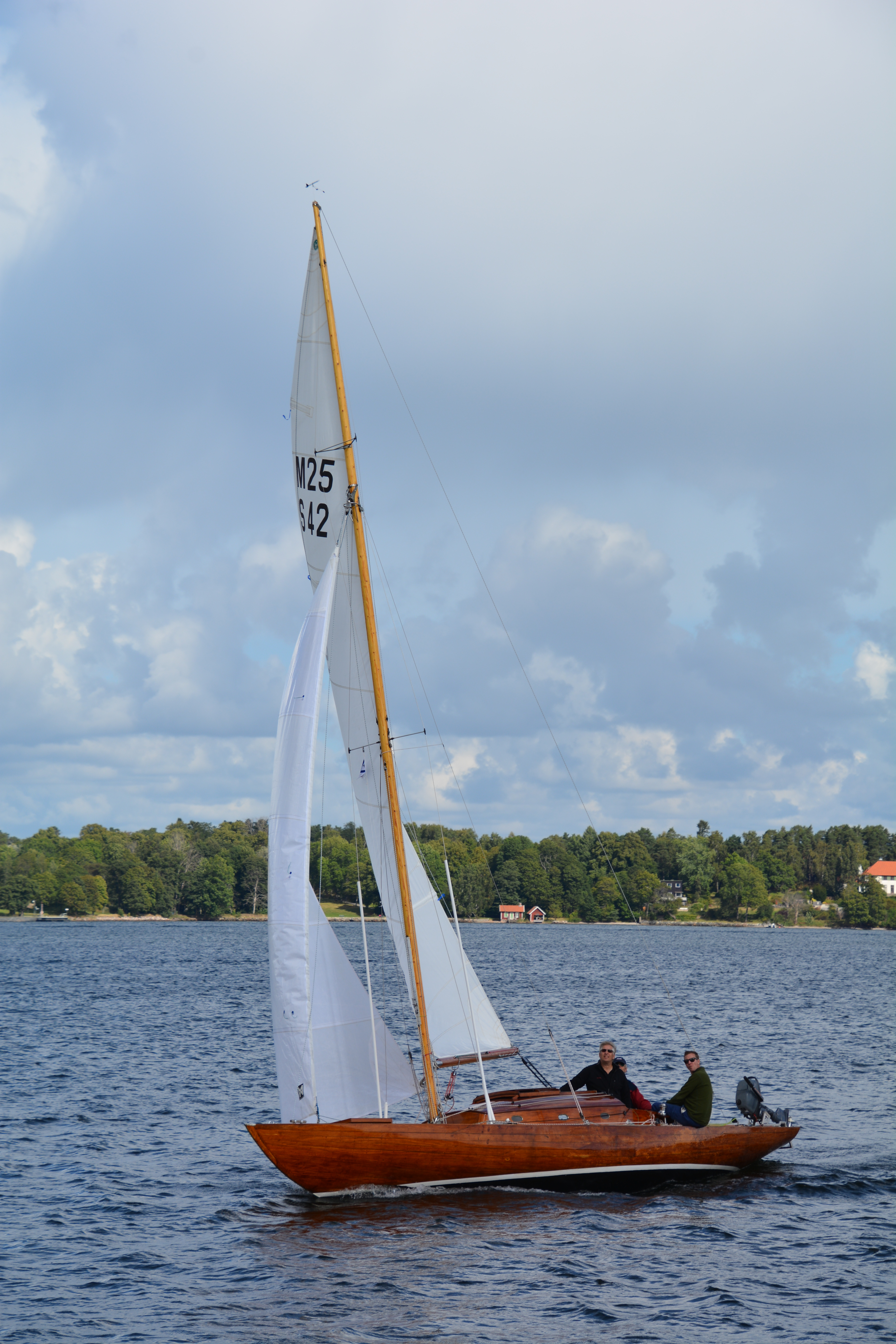
- Mälar 25 in 2015.

Development
- Designer: Erik Nilsson
- Year: 1948

Boat
- Draft: 1.30 m (4.3 ft)

Hull
- LOA: 10 m (33 ft)
- LWL: 7.30 m (24.0 ft)
- Beam: 2.10 m (6.9 ft)

Mälar 25 is a 10-metre (33 ft) sailboat class and built in about 65 copies.

== History ==
The Mälar 25 designed by Erik Nilsson won a design competition hosted by Mälarens Seglarförbund in 1948. The Mälar 25 was a response to the more and more expensive yachts built according to the Skerry cruiser rule.

== See also ==
- Mälar 22
- Mälar 30
