= Chain girth =

Measurement of a yacht hull

chain girth (CG)

Chain girth is a measurement of a yacht hull.

Chain girth is specified in some design rules to handicap or match the capabilities of sailing vessels of similar design such as the 12 metre boats. Chain girth is measured as a straight line from a given elevation on the hull near the waterline vertically from a specified fore-and-aft position and diagonally as viewed from the bow to a point on the hull near the keel. It differs from the skin girth which is measured following the surface of the hull.
