= Gustaf Estlander =

Finnish architect, yacht designer and speed skater

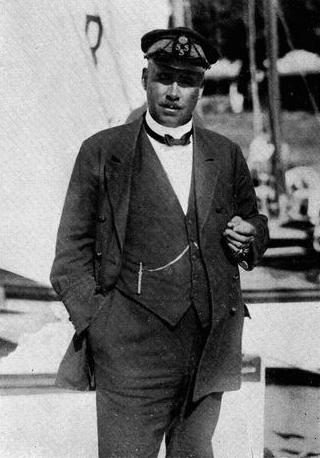

Personal information
- Full name: Gustaf Axel Estlander
- Born: 18 September 1876
- Died: 1 December 1930 (aged 54)

Sport

Sailing career
- Class: 8 Metre

Gustaf Axel Estlander (18 September 1876 – 1 December 1930) was a Finnish architect and one of the most successful Scandinavian yacht designers of the early 20th century. He was born and educated in Finland, later set up a yacht yard in Germany, and spent his final years in Sweden. As a sporty youth, Estlander in 1894 sailed from Finland to Sweden in a canoe. He was an accomplished skater, winning the 1898 European Speed Skating Championships for Men in Helsinki, Finland. He also competed at the 1912 Summer Olympics.

== Biography ==
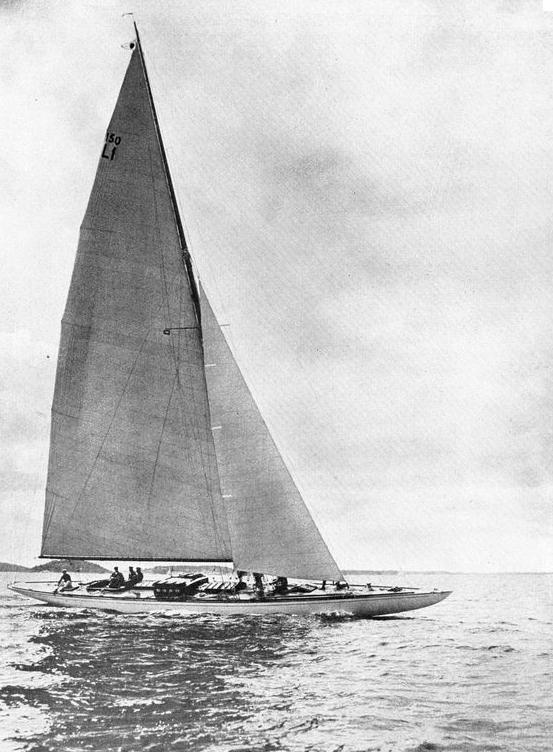
150 m^{2} skerry cruiser Singoalla, designed by Gustaf Estlander, on Kanholmsfjärden in 1922.

In 1898, Gustaf Estlander graduated as an architect from the Helsinki Polytechnic Institute (currently Aalto University). He founded the architectural firm of Estlander & Settergren, which in 1903–1915 designed a score of large apartment buildings in the booming capital city of Helsinki. These imposing buildings were created in the national romantic style. Some of them have lately been declared national heritage sites.

When Estlander turned full-time yacht designer in 1914, he had already drawn 60 sailboats. He gained a reputation for light, radical boats, such as the double-hulled Flamingo of 1899. He made his international breakthrough in 1917 at the helm of his 22 m^{2} skerry cruiser Colibri, trouncing all competitors at the Sandhamn Regatta in Sweden. He quickly gained a large number of design commissions from clients in northern Europe.

In the post-war years of 1921–23, he was chief designer and owner of the Pabst yard near Berlin, Germany. His 22 m^{2} and 30 m^{2} skerry cruisers were successful on the inland lakes of northern Germany. His own enormous 150 m^{2} skerry cruiser Singoalla reached 14.1 knots on a race from Kiel to Travemünde on the Baltic Sea, according to Uffa Fox, the well-known author on yacht design. Moving on to Sweden, Estlander obtained Swedish citizenship to be eligible for designing a Swedish entry for the 6 Metre Scandinavian Gold Cup. His creation May Be won the Gold Cup in the US in 1927 for Swedish shipping tycoon Sven Salén. His Gold Cup winners include the later Swedish entries Ingegerd and Ian.

In the 1920s, Gustaf Estlander reached international fame as a yacht designer, obtaining six-metre commissions from as far away as Cuba and Singapore. In total, more than 1000 yachts were built according to his drawings. Of these, 21 were six-metre yachts and eight were eight-metre yachts. His 8mR design Cheerio represented Finland at the 1936 Summer Olympic Games in Kiel, Germany. Estlander had himself participated in the 1912 Olympic regatta in Nynäshamn, Sweden, gaining a 4th place skippering his Fife-designed 8mR yacht Örn. Gustaf Estlander died at the height of his career, at only 54 years of age. A young employee at his design studio, Knud Reimers took over and continued Estlander's business, at 24 years of age.

== See also ==
- Villa Hjelt

== Sources ==
- Barck, Pekka & Street, Tim (2007). The Six Metre – 100 Years of Racing, pp D22-23. Helsinki: Oy Litorale Ab. ISBN 978-952-5045-31-4.
- van Bueren, John Lammerts (2000). The Great Eights, pp. 107–116. Milan: Fabio Ratti Editoria S.r.l. ISBN 88-87737-05-3.
- Ekberg, Henrik (2003). Uppslagsverket Finland, vol. 1, page 359. Espoo: Schildts Förlag Ab. ISBN 951-50-1356-9.
- Ericsson, Henry (2003). Finlandssvenska Tekniker, vol. 4, pp. 89–106. Helsinki: Tekniska Föreningen i Finland. ISBN 952-91-6603-6.
- Fox, Uffa (1936): Sail and Power, pp. 237–238. London: Peter Davies Ltd.
