= Mälar 30 =

Sailboat class

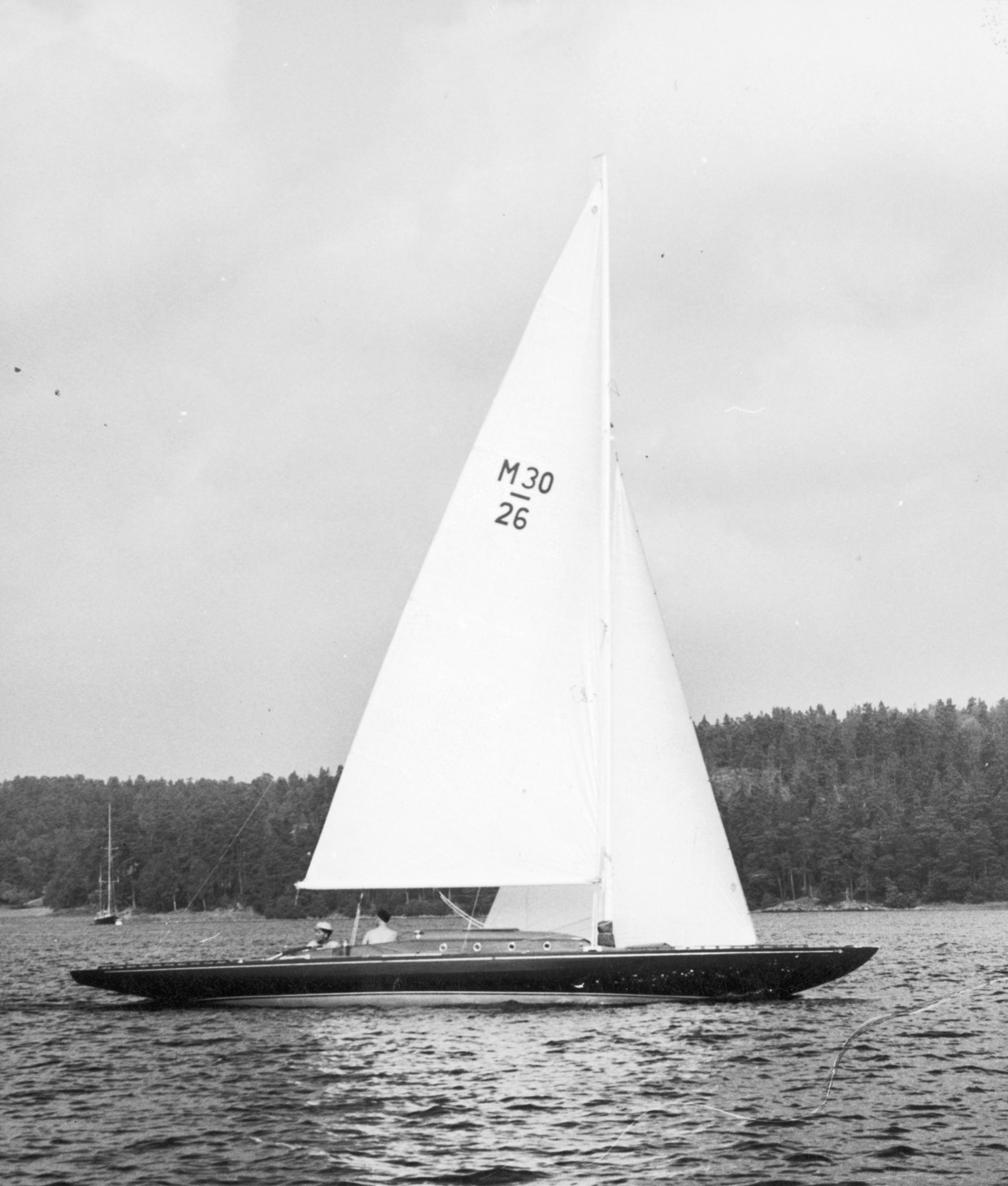
- Mälar 30 yacht

Development
- Designer: Lage Eklund
- Year: 1933

Boat
- Draft: 1.40 m (4.6 ft)

Hull
- LOA: 11.5 m (38 ft)
- LWL: 7.65 m (25.1 ft)
- Beam: 2.06 m (6.8 ft)

Mälar 30 is a 11.5-metre (38 ft) sailboat class designed by Lage Eklund and built in about 120 copies.

== History ==
Lage Eklund designed the Mälar 30 in 1933 for Mälarens Seglarförbund. The Mälar 30 was a response to the more and more expensive yachts built according to the Skerry cruiser rule.

== See also ==
- Mälar 22
- Mälar 25
