= Skerry cruiser =

Ship type

Skerry cruisers (or Square metre yachts) are yachts, usually wooden, which are constructed according to the Square metre rule. Originating from Sweden, they were historically most popular in the Baltic Sea, though some classes also saw popularity in other European countries and the United States. Skerry cruisers are construction classes, meaning that though the boats are not identical with each other, they are all built according to same formula, making them broadly comparable in size and performance. Most skerry cruisers are slender boats, with low freeboards and tall rigs.

The term "skerry cruiser" comes from the Swedish term skärgårdskryssare (German: Schärenkreuzer, (Finnish: saaristoristeilijä). The Swedish word "kryssare" has a slightly different and broader meaning than the English term "cruiser" and as such, the English translation is somewhat misleading.

== History ==
=== Origins ===
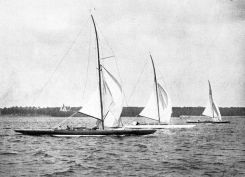
40 m^{2} Skerry cruisers at the 1920 Summer Olympics.

In 1907, the Swedish Sailing Federation established a committee to design a national racing yacht class. Previous handicap rules had tended to be very simple and boats had evolved to be very fast and extreme racing machines, which were perceived as unsafe and impractical. Recently developed other options were the Universal rule (also called 'American rule') and the International Metre rule, neither of which were seen as fully satisfactory by the Swedish Sailing Federation. The committee completed its proposal the following year. It was accepted as the first Square Metre Rule: yachts were to be classed by their sail area which was fixed. In addition, there were minimum requirements for weight and cabin measurements. Four new classes were originally accepted: 22 m^{2}, 30 m^{2}, 45 m^{2} and 55 m^{2}. Soon, new classes were to follow: the 38 m^{2} class in 1912; 15 m^{2}, 75 m^{2}, 95 m^{2}, 120 m^{2} and 150 m^{2} classes in 1913; finally in 1915, the 38 m^{2} and 45 m^{2} classes were combined into a new 40 m^{2} class. The new rule became very popular within the Baltic region; between 1907 and 1920, Finnish yards alone built some 600 Square metre rule yachts. During peak years, Skerry cruisers made up 95 percent of the yards' output. They were also exported to other European countries and the United States.

=== Decline and rebirth ===
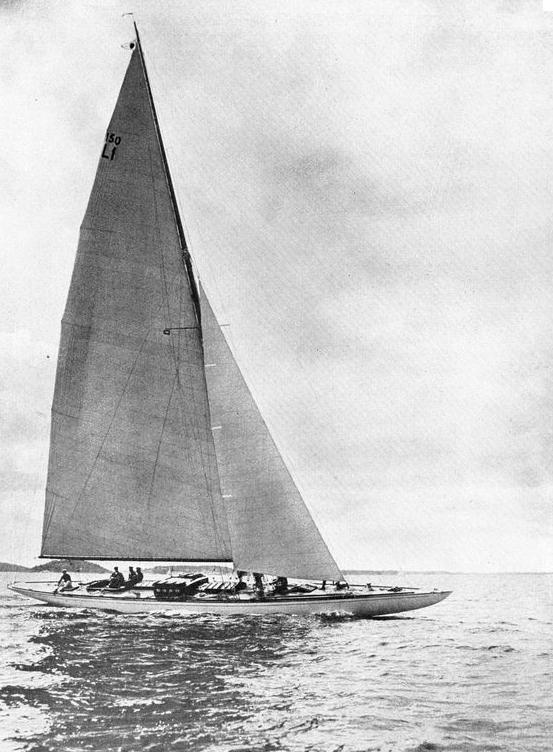
150 m^{2} Skerry cruiser Singoalla, designed by Gustaf Estlander, on Kanholmsfjärden in 1922.

The Square Metre rule was much less restrictive than competing International Rules. The relatively loose set of rules allowed previously built boats into the new classes if their rigging was modified to comply with the rules. They also gave designers relatively free hand, and top designers like the Finns Gustaf Estlander and Zake Westin soon came up with very extreme designs which pushed contemporary sailboat technology to its limits. Development was dramatic: for example, whilst early 40 m^{2} boats tended to be around 9 to 10 metres long, in 1923 Westin designed a 40 m^{2} boat which was 15.2 metres long and had a beam of only 1.74 m — a length to beam ratio of nearly 9 to 1. An often cited example as some sort of pinnacle of the rule was the 150 m^{2} Singoalla, designed by Estlander in 1919 and claimed to have been the fastest boat in the Baltic: Uffa Fox had the dubious pleasure of surfing this boat at 14 knots and claimed afterward that it followed the waves "like a sea serpent".

This development quickly led to diminishing popularity of the Square Metre rule as these extreme hulls were perceived simply as too weak and uncomfortable to ride. 30 m^{2} and 40 m^{2} classes were accepted to the 1920 Summer Olympics, but only a handful of boats participated. Meanwhile, International Rule had been revised in 1919 and in their new form became very popular, soon supplanting the Square Metre rule boats in the international arena and Olympic regattas.

As weaknesses of the original rule became apparent, the Swedish Sailing Federation enacted a number of modifications from 1916 onwards. Construction standards became much more strict and classes had minimum freeboard and maximum lengths defined. The Rule also specified new minimum measurements for internal space, to ensure that boats would have adequate room for accommodations. This is in contrast to International Rule designs where cabins are not required. The final revision of the rule was issued in 1925. It is still in effect with only minor later changes.

=== Legacy ===
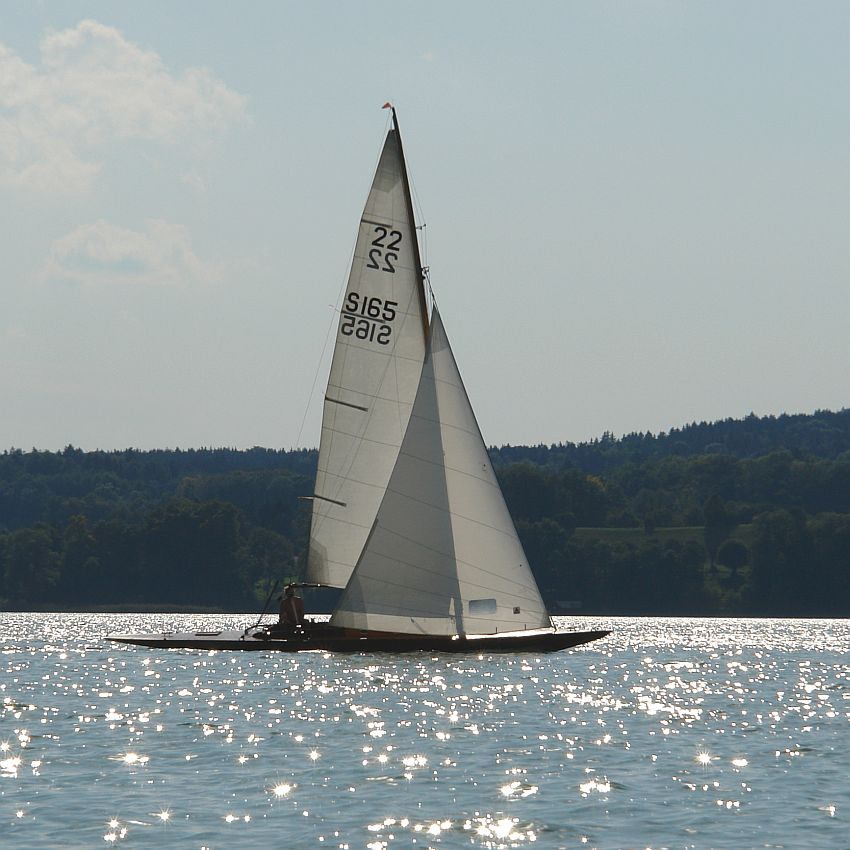
22 m^{2} Skerry cruiser

As with many other sailing handicap and construction rules, the Square Metre rule fell in popularity as its weaknesses were discovered. However, in its revised form it has proved to be enduring and new boats following the rule are still built today. The internationally most active classes are the 22 m^{2} and 30 m^{2}. Larger classes are mostly boats built prior to the 1925 rule and generally only found in the Baltic, where they are dutifully cared for by enthusiasts. Although it was never quite as widespread as the International Rule, the Square Metre rule has a devoted following in many countries. Strongholds of the rule have traditionally been Sweden, Finland and Germany, which also had national Square Metre rule boats, known as Seefahrtkreuzer. Many German square metre boats were confiscated by the British during and after World War II and transferred to Britain, where they became known as 'Windfall' yachts.

In addition, the Square Metre rule produced a number of related one-design and construction classes, which usually were an attempt to design a cheaper alternative to high-end yachts. These include Swedish Mälar boats (M15, M22, M25 and M30), Finnish Nordic 22, 'B' class Skerry cruisers and others. Some other early one-design classes, such as the Hai, show obvious Skerry cruiser influence. Swede 55 and Swede 41 yachts were also based on Square Metre boats.

== See also ==
- International rule (sailing)
- Ton class
- Universal rule
