= Sven Salén =

Swedish sailor

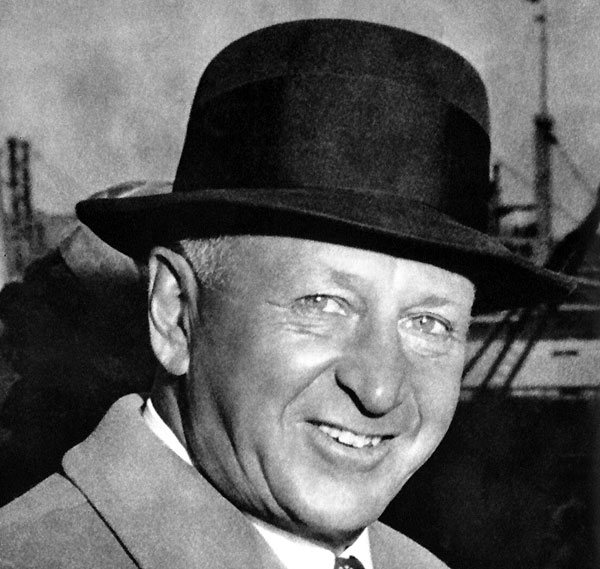
- Salén in 1959

Personal information
- Born: 7 November 1890 Borås, Sweden
- Died: 29 October 1969 (aged 78) Stockholm, Sweden

Sailing career
- Sport: Sailing
- Club: Royal Swedish Yacht Club
Medal record
Sailing
Representing Sweden
Olympic Games
Bronze medal – third place	1936 Berlin	Mixed 6 m class

Sven Gustaf Salén (7 November 1890 – 29 October 1969) was a Swedish sailor who competed in the 1936 and 1952 Summer Olympics. In 1936, together with his wife Dagmar Salén, he won a bronze medal in the mixed 6 m class as the helmsman of the boat May Be. Sixteen years later he finished fourth as the helmsman of the boat May Be VII in the same event.

Between 1922 and 1962 Salén ran his company Salén Lines. He was first to use an oversized foresail on his 6 meter racing yacht "May-Be" in the 1926 race Coppa del Tirreno in Genoa. This is why this sail is called a genoa. He successfully used it during the Scandinavian Gold Cup’s races of 1927 in Oyster Bay (US).

Sven Salén also pioneered the parachute spinnaker. His sailing career was boosted after his team won the 6 m event at the unofficial world championships in 1927. In 1927 he received the Svenska Dagbladet Gold Medal.

Salén was also a singer-songwriter and a founder, with Ulf Peder Olrog, of the Swedish Song Archive. Two of his songs, "Sången till havet" (Song to the Ocean) and "Visa kring slånbom och månskära" (Song of Blackthorn and Crescent Moon) were recorded by Jussi Björling.

In 1931 Salén married Dagmar Mörner, daughter of a baroness. Their son Sven H. Salén (sv; born 1939) became a lawyer and politician.
