= List of Olympic medalists in sailing by class =

This is a list of Olympic medalists in sailing.

== Current classes ==
List of Olympic medalists in sailing by class

=== Open 470 ===
Games	Gold	Silver	Bronze
1976 Montreal	West Germany; Frank Hübner; Harro Bode	Spain; Antonio Gorostegui; Pedro Millet	Australia; Ian Brown; Ian Ruff
1980 Moscow	Brazil; Marcos Soares; Eduardo Penido	East Germany; Jorn Borowski; Egbert Swensson	Finland; Jouko Lindgrén; Georg Tallberg
1984 Los Angeles	Spain; Luis Doreste; Roberto Molina	United States; Steve Benjamin; Chris Steinfeld	France; Thierry Peponnet; Luc Pillot

=== Men's 470 ===
Games	Gold	Silver	Bronze
1988 Seoul	France; Thierry Peponnet; Luc Pillot	Soviet Union; Tõnu Tõniste; Toomas Tõniste	United States; John Shadden; Charles McKee
1992 Barcelona	Spain; Jordi Calafat; Francisco Sanchez	United States; Morgan Reeser; Kevin Burnham	Estonia; Tõnu Tõniste; Toomas Tõniste
1996 Atlanta	Ukraine; Yevhen Braslavets; Ihor Matviyenko	Great Britain; John Merricks; Ian Walker	Portugal; Victor Rocha; Nuno Barreto
2000 Sydney	Australia; Tom King; Mark Turnbull	United States; Paul Foerster; Robert Merrick	Argentina; Javier Conte; Juan de la Fuente
2004 Athens	United States; Paul Foerster; Kevin Burnham	Great Britain; Nick Rogers; Joe Glanfield	Japan; Kazuto Seki; Kenjiro Todoroki
2008 Beijing	Australia; Nathan Wilmot; Malcolm Page	Great Britain; Nick Rogers; Joe Glanfield	France; Nicolas Charbonnier; Olivier Bausset
2012 London	Australia; Mathew Belcher; Malcolm Page	Great Britain; Luke Patience; Stuart Bithell	Argentina; Lucas Calabrese; Juan de la Fuente
2016 Rio de Janeiro	Croatia; Šime Fantela; Igor Marenić	Australia; Mathew Belcher; William Ryan	Greece; Panagiotis Mantis; Pavlos Kagialis
2020 Tokyo	Australia; Mathew Belcher; William Ryan	Sweden; Anton Dahlberg; Fredrik Bergström	Spain; Jordi Xammar; Nicolás Rodríguez

=== Women's 470 ===
Games	Gold	Silver	Bronze
1988 Seoul	United States; Allison Jolly; Lynne Jewell	Sweden; Marit Söderström; Birgitta Bengtsson	Soviet Union; Larisa Moskalenko; Iryna Chunykhovska
1992 Barcelona	Spain; Theresa Zabell; Patricia Guerra	New Zealand; Leslie Egnot; Jan Shearer	United States; Jennifer Isler; Pamela Healy
1996 Atlanta	Spain; Theresa Zabell; Begoña Vía Dufresne	Japan; Yumiko Shige; Alicia Kinoshita	Ukraine; Ruslana Taran; Olena Pakholchik
2000 Sydney	Australia; Jenny Armstrong; Belinda Stowell	United States; J. J. Isler; Sarah Glaser	Ukraine; Ruslana Taran; Olena Pakholchik
2004 Athens	Greece; Sofia Bekatorou; Emilia Tsoulfa	Spain; Sandra Azón; Natalia Vía Dufresne	Sweden; Therese Torgersson; Vendela Zachrisson
2008 Beijing	Australia; Elise Rechichi; Tessa Parkinson	Netherlands; Marcelien de Koning; Lobke Berkhout	Brazil; Fernanda Oliveira; Isabel Swan
2012 London	New Zealand; Jo Aleh; Polly Powrie	Great Britain; Hannah Mills; Saskia Clark	Netherlands; Lisa Westerhof; Lobke Berkhout
2016 Rio de Janeiro	Great Britain; Hannah Mills; Saskia Clark	New Zealand; Jo Aleh; Polly Powrie	France; Camille Lecointre; Hélène Defrance
2020 Tokyo	Great Britain; Hannah Mills; Eilidh McIntyre	Poland; Agnieszka Skrzypulec; Jolanta Ogar	France; Camille Lecointre; Aloïse Retornaz

=== Mixed 470 ===
Games	Gold	Silver	Bronze
2024 Paris	Austria; Lara Vadlau; Lukas Mähr	Japan; Keiju Okada; Miho Yoshioka	Sweden; Anton Dahlberg; Lovisa Karlsson
2028 Los Angeles			

=== 49er ===
Games	Gold	Silver	Bronze
2000 Sydney	Finland; Thomas Johanson; Jyrki Järvi	Great Britain; Ian Barker; Simon Hiscocks	United States; Jonathan McKee; Charlie McKee
2004 Athens	Spain; Iker Martínez; Xabier Fernández	Ukraine; Rodion Luka; George Leonchuk	Great Britain; Chris Draper; Simon Hiscocks
2008 Beijing	Denmark; Jonas Warrer; Martin Kirketerp	Spain; Iker Martínez; Xabier Fernández	Germany; Jan-Peter Peckolt; Hannes Peckolt
2012 London	Australia; Nathan Outteridge; Iain Jensen	New Zealand; Peter Burling; Blair Tuke	Denmark; Allan Nørregaard; Peter Lang
2016 Rio de Janeiro	New Zealand; Peter Burling; Blair Tuke	Australia; Nathan Outteridge; Iain Jensen	Germany; Erik Heil; Thomas Plößel
2020 Tokyo	Great Britain; Dylan Fletcher; Stuart Bithell	New Zealand; Peter Burling; Blair Tuke	Germany; Erik Heil; Thomas Plößel
2024 Paris	Spain; Diego Botín; Florián Trittel	New Zealand; Isaac McHardie; William McKenzie	United States; Ian Barrows; Hans Henken
2028 Los Angeles			

=== 49er FX ===
Games	Gold	Silver	Bronze
2016 Rio de Janeiro	Brazil; Martine Grael; Kahena Kunze	New Zealand; Alex Maloney; Molly Meech	Denmark; Jena Mai Hansen; Katja Salskov-Iversen
2020 Tokyo	Brazil; Martine Grael; Kahena Kunze	Germany; Tina Lutz; Susann Beucke	Netherlands; Annemiek Bekkering; Annette Duetz
2024 Paris	Netherlands; Odile van Aanholt; Annette Duetz	Sweden; Vilma Bobeck; Rebecca Netzler	France; Sarah Steyaert; Charline Picon
2028 Los Angeles			

=== Men's IQFoil ===
Games	Gold	Silver	Bronze
2024 Paris	Tom Reuveny; Israel	Grae Morris; Australia	Luuc van Opzeeland; Netherlands
2028 Los Angeles			

=== Women's IQFoil ===
Games	Gold	Silver	Bronze
2024 Paris	Marta Maggetti; Italy	Sharon Kantor; Israel	Emma Wilson; Great Britain
2028 Los Angeles			

=== Men's Kite ===
Games	Gold	Silver	Bronze
2024 Paris	Valentin Bontus; Austria	Toni Vodišek; Slovenia	Maximilian Maeder; Singapore
2028 Los Angeles			

=== Women's Kite ===
Games	Gold	Silver	Bronze
2024 Paris	Ellie Aldridge; Great Britain	Lauriane Nolot; France	Annelous Lammerts; Netherlands
2028 Los Angeles			

=== Laser ===
Games	Gold	Silver	Bronze
1996 Atlanta	Robert Scheidt; Brazil	Ben Ainslie; Great Britain	Peer Moberg; Norway
2000 Sydney	Ben Ainslie; Great Britain	Robert Scheidt; Brazil	Michael Blackburn; Australia
2004 Athens	Robert Scheidt; Brazil	Andreas Geritzer; Austria	Vasilij Žbogar; Slovenia
2008 Beijing	Paul Goodison; Great Britain	Vasilij Žbogar; Slovenia	Diego Romero; Italy
2012 London	Tom Slingsby; Australia	Pavlos Kontides; Cyprus	Rasmus Myrgren; Sweden
2016 Rio de Janeiro	Tom Burton; Australia	Tonči Stipanović; Croatia	Sam Meech; New Zealand
2020 Tokyo	Matthew Wearn; Australia	Tonči Stipanović; Croatia	Hermann Tomasgaard; Norway
2024 Paris	Matthew Wearn; Australia	Pavlos Kontides; Cyprus	Stefano Peschiera; Peru
2028 Los Angeles			

=== Laser Radial ===
Games	Gold	Silver	Bronze
2008 Beijing	Anna Tunnicliffe; United States	Gintarė Volungevičiūtė; Lithuania	Xu Lijia; China
2012 London	Xu Lijia; China	Marit Bouwmeester; Netherlands	Evi Van Acker; Belgium
2016 Rio de Janeiro	Marit Bouwmeester; Netherlands	Annalise Murphy; Ireland	Anne-Marie Rindom; Denmark
2020 Tokyo	Anne-Marie Rindom; Denmark	Josefin Olsson; Sweden	Marit Bouwmeester; Netherlands
2024 Paris	Marit Bouwmeester; Netherlands	Anne-Marie Rindom; Denmark	Line Flem Høst; Norway
2028 Los Angeles			

=== Nacra 17 ===
Games	Gold	Silver	Bronze
2016 Rio de Janeiro	Argentina; Santiago Lange; Cecilia Carranza Saroli	Australia; Jason Waterhouse; Lisa Darmanin	Austria; Thomas Zajac; Tanja Frank
2020 Tokyo	Italy; Ruggero Tita; Caterina Banti	Great Britain; John Gimson; Anna Burnet	Germany; Paul Kohlhoff; Alica Stuhlemmer
2024 Paris	Italy; Ruggero Tita; Caterina Banti	Argentina; Mateo Majdalani; Eugenia Bosco	New Zealand; Micah Wilkinson; Erica Dawson
2028 Los Angeles			

== Discontinued classes ==
=== International Metre Rule ===
==== 5.5 Metre ====
Rank	Nation	Gold	Silver	Bronze	Total
1	Sweden	2	1	1	4
2	United States	2	0	2	4
3	Australia	1	0	0	1
4	Great Britain	0	1	1	2
4	Switzerland	0	1	1	2
6	Denmark	0	1	0	1
6	Norway	0	1	0	1
Totals (7 entries)		5	5	5	15

Games	Gold	Silver	Bronze
1952 Helsinki	United States; Britton Chance; Michael Schoettle; Edgar White; Sumner White	Norway; Peder Lunde; Vibeke Lunde; Børre Falkum-Hansen	Sweden; Folke Wassén; Carl-Erik Ohlson; Magnus Wassén
1956 Melbourne	Sweden; Lars Thörn; Hjalmar Karlsson; Sture Stork	Great Britain; Robert Perry; David Bowker; John Dillon; Neil Kennedy-Cochran-Patrick	Australia; Jock Sturrock; Douglas Buxton; Devereaux Mytton
1960 Rome	United States; George O'Day; James Hunt; David Smith	Denmark; William Berntsen; Steen Christensen; Sören Hancke	Switzerland; Henri Copponex; Pierre Girard; Manfred Metzger
1964 Tokyo	Australia; William Northam; Peter O'Donnell; James Sargeant	Sweden; Lars Thörn; Arne Karlsson; Sture Stork	United States; John J. McNamara; Joseph Batchelder; Francis Scully
1968 Mexico City	Sweden; Ulf Sundelin; Jörgen Sundelin; Peter Sundelin	Switzerland; Louis Noverraz; Bernhard Dunand; Marcel Stern	Great Britain; Robin Aisher; Paul Anderson; Adrian Jardine

==== 6 Metre ====
Games	Gold	Silver	Bronze
1908 London	Great Britain; Gilbert Laws; Thomas McMeekin; Charles Crichton	Belgium; Léon Huybrechts; Louis Huybrechts; Henri Weewauters	France; Henri Arthus; Louis Potheau; Pierre Rabot
1912 Stockholm	France; Gaston Thubé; Amédée Thubé; Jacques Thubé	Denmark; Hans Meulengracht-Madsen; Steen Herschend; Sven Thomsen	Sweden; Eric Sandberg; Otto Aust; Harald Sandberg
1920 Antwerp; 1907 rule	Belgium; Émile Cornellie; Frédéric Bruynseels; Florimond Cornellie	Norway; Einar Torgersen; Leif Erichsen; Andreas Knudsen	Norway; Henrik Agersborg; Einar Berntsen; Trygve Pedersen
1920 Antwerp; 1919 rule	Norway; Andreas Brecke; Paal Kaasen; Ingolf Rød	Belgium; Léon Huybrechts; Charles Van Den Bussche; John Klotz	No further competitors
1924 Paris	Norway; Anders Lundgren; Christopher Dahl; Eugen Lunde	Denmark; Vilhelm Vett; Knud Degn; Christian Nielsen	Netherlands; Johan Carp; Anthonij Guépin; Jan Vreede
1928 Amsterdam	Norway; Johan Anker; Erik Anker; Håkon Bryhn; Crown Prince Olav	Denmark; Vilhelm Vett; Aage Høy-Petersen; Niels Otto Møller; Peter Schlütter	Estonia; Nikolai Vekšin; Andreas Faehlmann; Georg Faehlmann; Eberhard Vogdt; William von Wirén
1932 Los Angeles	Sweden; Tore Holm; Olle Åkerlund; Åke Bergqvist; Martin Hindorff	United States; Robert Carlson; Temple Ashbrook; Frederic Conant; Emmett Davis; Donald Douglas; Charles Smith	Canada; Philip Rogers; Gardner Boultbee; Ken Glass; Jerry Wilson
1936 Berlin	Great Britain; Christopher Boardman; Miles Bellville; Russell Harmer; Charles Leaf; Leonard Martin	Norway; Magnus Konow; Karsten Konow; Fredrik Meyer; Vaadjuv Nyqvist; Alf Tveten	Sweden; Sven Salén; Lennart Ekdahl; Martin Hindorff; Torsten Lord; Dagmar Salén
1948 London	United States; Herman Whiton; Alfred Loomis; Michael Mooney; James Smith; James Weekes	Argentina (ARG); Enrique Sieburger, Sr. Emilio Homps; Rodolfo Rivademar; Rufino Rodríguez de la Torre; Enrique Sieburger, Jr. Julio Sieburger	Finland; Tore Holm; Carl Robert Ameln; Martin Hindorff; Torsten Lord; Gösta Salén
1952 Helsinki	United States; Herman Whiton; Everard Endt; John Morgan; Eric Ridder; Julian Roosevelt; Emelyn Whiton	Norway; Finn Ferner; Tor Arneberg; Johan Ferner; Erik Heiberg; Carl Mortensen	Finland; Ernst Westerlund; Ragnar Jansson; Jonas Konto; Rolf Turkka; Paul Sjöberg

==== 7 Metre ====
Games	Gold	Silver	Bronze
1908 London	Great Britain; Charles Rivett-Carnac; Norman Bingley; Richard Dixon; Frances Rivett-Carnac	The second competitor failed to make it to the start.	No further competition

==== 8 Metre ====
Games	Gold	Silver	Bronze
1908 London	Great Britain; Blair Cochrane; Charles Campbell; John Rhodes; Henry Sutton; Arthur Wood	Sweden; Carl Hellström; Edmund Thormählen; Eric Sandberg; Erik Wallerius; Harald Wallin; The Duchess of Westminster	Great Britain; Philip Hunloke; Alfred Hughes; Frederick Hughes; George Ratsey; William Ward
1912 Stockholm	Norway; Thoralf Glad; Thomas Aas; Andreas Brecke; Torleiv Corneliussen; Christian Jebe	Sweden; Bengt Heyman; Emil Henriques; Alvar Thiel; Herbert Westermark; Nils Westermark	Finland (FIN); Bertil Tallberg; Arthur Ahnger; Emil Lindh; Gunnar Tallberg; Georg Westling
1920 Antwerp; 1907 rule	Norway; Carl Ringvold; Thorleif Holbye; Alf Jacobsen; Kristoffer Olsen; Tellef Wagle	No further competitors	No further competitors
1920 Antwerp; 1919 rule	Norway; Magnus Konow; Thorleif Christoffersen; Reidar Marthiniussen; Ragnar Vik	Norway; Jens Salvesen; Finn Schiander; Lauritz Schmidt; Nils Thomas; Ralph Tschudi	Belgium; Albert Grisar; Willy de l'Arbre; Georges Hellebuyck; Léopold Standaert; Henri Weewauters
1924 Paris	Norway; Carl Ringvold; Rick Bockelie; Harald Hagen; Ingar Nielsen; Carl Ringvold, Jr.	Great Britain; Ernest Roney; Harold Fowler; Edwin Jacob; Thomas Riggs; Walter Riggs	France; Louis Breguet; Pierre Gauthier; Robert Girardet; André Guerrier; Georges Mollard
1928 Amsterdam	France; Donatien Bouché; André Derrien; Virginie Hériot; André Lesauvage; Jean Lesieur; Carl de la Sablière	Netherlands; Johannes van Hoolwerff; Lambertus Doedes; Hendrik Kersken; Cornelis van Staveren; Gerard de Vries Lentsch; Maarten de Wit	Sweden; Clarence Hammar; Tore Holm; Carl Sandblom; John Sandblom; Philip Sandblom; Wilhelm Törsleff
1932 Los Angeles	United States; Owen Churchill; John Biby; Alphonse Burnand; Kenneth Carey; William Cooper; Pierpont Davis; Carl Dorsey; John Huettner; Richard Moore; Alan Morgan; Robert Sutton; Thomas Webster	Canada (CAN); Ronald Maitland; Ernest Cribb; Peter Gordon; George Gyles; Harry Jones; Hubert Wallace	No further competitors
1936 Berlin	Italy; Giovanni Reggio; Bruno Bianchi; Luigi De Manincor; Domenico Mordini; Enrico Poggi; Luigi Poggi	Norway; Olaf Ditlev-Simonsen; John Ditlev-Simonsen; Hans Struksnæs; Lauritz Schmidt; Jacob Thams; Nordahl Wallem	Germany; Hans Howaldt; Fritz Bischoff; Alfried Krupp von Bohlen und Halbach; Eduard Mohr; Felix Scheder-Bieschin; Otto Wachs

==== 10 Metre ====
Games	Gold	Silver	Bronze
1912 Stockholm	Sweden; Filip Ericsson; Carl Hellström; Paul Isberg; Humbert Lundén; Herman Nyberg; Harry Rosenswärd; Erik Wallerius; Harald Wallin	Finland (FIN); Harry Wahl; Waldemar Björkstén; Jacob Björnström; Bror Brenner; Allan Franck; Erik Lindh; Juho Aarne Pekkalainen	Russia (RUS); Esper Beloselsky; Ernest Brasche; Karl Lindholm; Nikolay Pushnitsky; Aleksandr Rodionov; Iosif Shomaker; Philipp Strauch
1920 Antwerp; 1907 rule	Norway; Erik Herseth; Gunnar Jamvold; Petter Jamvold; Claus Juell; Sigurd Holter; Ingar Nielsen; Ole Sørensen	No further competitors	No further competitors
1920 Antwerp; 1919 rule	Norway; Charles Arentz; Otto Falkenberg; Robert Giertsen; Willy Gilbert; Halfdan Schjøtt; Trygve Schjøtt; Arne Sejersted	No further competitors	No further competitors

==== 12 Metre ====
Games	Gold	Silver	Bronze
1908 London	Great Britain; T. C. Glen-Coats (helmsman); J. H. Downes (mate); J. S. Aspin; John Buchanan; J. C. Bunten; A. D. Downes; David Dunlop; John Mackenzie; Albert Martin; Gerald Tait	Great Britain; C. MacIver (helmsman); J. G. Kenion (mate); J. M. Adam; James Baxter; W. P. Davidson; J. F. Jellico; T. A. R. Littledale; C. R. MacIver; C. Macleod Robertson; J. F. D. Spence	No further competition
1912 Stockholm	Norway; Johan Anker; Nils Bertelsen; Eilert Falch-Lund; Halfdan Hansen; Arnfinn Heje; Magnus Konow; Alfred Larsen; Petter Larsen; Christian Staib; Carl Thaulow	Sweden; Nils Persson; Per Bergman; Dick Bergström; Kurt Bergström; Hugo Clason; Folke Johnson; Sigurd Kander; Ivan Lamby; Erik Lindqvist; Hugo Sällström	Finland (FIN); Ernst Krogius; Ferdinand Alfthan; Pekka Hartvall; Jarl Hulldén; Sigurd Juslén; Eino Sandelin; Johan Silén
1920 Antwerp; 1907 rule	Norway; Henrik Østervold; Halvor Birkeland; Rasmus Birkeland; Lauritz Christiansen; Hans Naess; Halvor Møgster; Jan Østervold; Kristian Østervold; Ole Østervold	No further competitors	No further competitors
1920 Antwerp; 1919 rule	Norway; Johan Friele; Arthur Allers; Martin Borthen; Kaspar Hassel; Erik Ørvig; Olav Örvig; Thor Ørvig; Egill Reimers; Christen Wiese	No further competitors	No further competitors

=== 6.5 Metre ===
Games	Gold	Silver	Bronze
1920 Antwerp	Netherlands; Joop Carp; Berend Carp; Petrus Wernink	France; Albert Weil; Robert Monier; Félix Picon	No further competitors

=== 12' Dinghy ===
Games	Gold	Silver	Bronze
1920 Antwerp	Netherlands; Cornelis Hin; Johan Hin; Frans Hin	Netherlands; Arnoud van der Biesen; Petrus Beukers	No further competitors
1928 Amsterdam	Sweden; Sven Thorell	Norway; Henrik Robert	Finland; Bertil Broman

=== 12 Square meter Sharpie ===
Games	Gold	Silver	Bronze
1956 Melbourne details	New Zealand; Peter Mander; Jack Cropp	Australia; Rolly Tasker; John Scott	Great Britain; Jasper Blackall; Terence Smith

=== 18' Dinghy ===
Although many recent sources list the event as having taken place, contemporary accounts conflict. Yachting World states that the sole entrant, Brat, did not compete, while Seglarbladet reports that it started but retired with a breakdown. The International Olympic Committee (IOC) does not credit Francis Richards and Trevor Hedberg with gold medals.

Games	DNF		
1920 Antwerp	Great Britain; Francis Richards; Trevor Hedberg	No further competitors	No further competitors

=== Finn ===
Games	Gold	Silver	Bronze
1952 Helsinki: Open	Paul Elvstrøm; Denmark	Charles Currey; Great Britain	Rickard Sarby; Sweden
1956 Melbourne: Open	Paul Elvstrøm; Denmark	André Nelis; Belgium	John Marvin; United States
1960 Rome: Open	Paul Elvstrøm; Denmark	Aleksander Tšutšelov; Soviet Union	André Nelis; Belgium
1964 Tokyo: Open	Wilhelm Kuhweide; United Team of Germany	Peter Barrett; United States	Henning Wind; Denmark
1968 Mexico City: Open	Valentin Mankin; Soviet Union	Hubert Raudaschl; Austria	Fabio Albarelli; Italy
1972 Munich: Open	Serge Maury; France	Ilias Hatzipavlis; Greece	Viktor Potapov; Soviet Union
1976 Montreal: Open	Jochen Schümann; East Germany	Andrei Balashov; Soviet Union	John Bertrand; Australia
1980 Moscow: Open	Esko Rechardt; Finland	Wolfgang Mayrhofer; Austria	Andrei Balashov; Soviet Union
1984 Los Angeles: Open	Russell Coutts; New Zealand	John Bertrand; United States	Terry Neilson; Canada
1988 Seoul: Male	José Doreste; Spain	Peter Holmberg; Virgin Islands	John Cutler; New Zealand
1992 Barcelona: Male	José van der Ploeg; Spain	Brian Ledbetter; United States	Craig Monk; New Zealand
1996 Atlanta: Male	Mateusz Kusznierewicz; Poland	Sebastien Godefroid; Belgium	Roy Heiner; Netherlands
2000 Sydney: Male	Iain Percy; Great Britain	Luca Devoti; Italy	Fredrik Lööf; Sweden
2004 Athens: Male	Ben Ainslie; Great Britain	Rafael Trujillo; Spain	Mateusz Kusznierewicz; Poland
2008 Beijing: Open	Ben Ainslie; Great Britain	Zach Railey; United States	Guillaume Florent; France
2012 London: Male	Ben Ainslie; Great Britain	Jonas Høgh-Christensen; Denmark	Jonathan Lobert; France
2016 Rio de Janeiro: Male	Giles Scott; Great Britain	Vasilij Žbogar; Slovenia	Caleb Paine; United States
2020 Tokyo: Male	Giles Scott; Great Britain	Zsombor Berecz; Hungary	Joan Cardona Méndez; Spain

=== Skerry cruiser ===
==== 30m2 Skerry cruiser ====
Games	Gold	Silver	Bronze
1920 Antwerp	Sweden; Gösta Lundqvist; Gösta Bengtsson; Rolf Steffenburg	No further competitors	No further competitors

==== 40m2 Skerry cruiser ====
Games	Gold	Silver	Bronze
1920 Antwerp	Sweden; Tore Holm; Yngve Holm; Axel Rydin; Georg Tengwall	Sweden; Gustaf Svensson; Percy Almstedt; Erik Mellbin; Ragnar Svensson	No further competitors

=== Division II ===
Games	Gold	Silver	Bronze
1988 Seoul	New Zealand; Bruce Kendall	Netherlands Antilles; Jan Boersma	United States; Mike Gebhardt

=== Dragon ===
Games	Gold	Silver	Bronze
1948 London	Norway; Thor Thorvaldsen; Haakon Barfod; Sigve Lie	Sweden; Folke Bohlin; Gösta Brodin; Hugo Johnson	Denmark; William Berntsen; Klaus Baess; Ole Berntsen
1952 Helsinki	Norway; Thor Thorvaldsen; Haakon Barfod; Sigve Lie	Sweden; Per Gedda; Erland Almqvist; Sidney Boldt-Christmas	Germany; Theodor Thomsen; Erich Natusch; Georg Nowka
1956 Melbourne	Sweden; Folke Bohlin; Bengt Palmquist; Leif Wikström	Denmark; Ole Berntsen; Cyril Andresen; Christian von Bülow	Great Britain; Graham Mann; Ronald Backus; Jonathan Janson
1960 Rome	Greece; Crown Prince Constantine; Odysseus Eskidioglou; Georgios Zaimis	Argentina; Jorge Salas Chávez; Héctor Calegaris; Jorge del Río Sálas	Italy; Antonio Cosentino; Antonio Ciciliano; Giulio De Stefano
1964 Tokyo	Denmark; Ole Berntsen; Christian von Bülow; Ole Poulsen	Germany (EUA); Peter Ahrendt; Wilfried Lorenz; Ulrich Mense	United States; Lowell North; Richard Deaver; Charles Rogers
1968 Mexico City	United States; George Friedrichs; Barton Jahncke; Gerald Schreck	Denmark; Aage Birch; Poul Richard Høj Jensen; Niels Markussen	East Germany; Paul Borowski; Karl-Heinz Thun; Konrad Weichert
1972 Munich	Australia; John Cuneo; Thomas Anderson; John Shaw	East Germany; Paul Borowski; Karl-Heinz Thun; Konrad Weichert	United States; Donald Cohan; Charles Horter; John Marshall

=== Elliott 6m ===
Games	Gold	Silver	Bronze
2012 London	Spain; Támara Echegoyen; Ángela Pumariega; Sofía Toro	Australia; Olivia Price; Nina Curtis; Lucinda Whitty	Finland; Silja Lehtinen; Silja Kanerva; Mikaela Wulff

=== Europe ===
Games	Gold	Silver	Bronze
1992 Barcelona	Norway; Linda Cerup-Simonsen	Spain; Natalia Vía Dufresne	United States; Julia Trotman
1996 Atlanta	Denmark; Kristine Roug	Netherlands; Margriet Matthijsse	United States; Courtenay Becker-Dey
2000 Sydney	Great Britain; Shirley Robertson	Netherlands; Margriet Matthijsse	Argentina; Serena Amato
2004 Athens	Norway; Siren Sundby	Czech Republic; Lenka Smidova	Denmark; Signe Livbjerg

=== Firefly ===
Games	Gold	Silver	Bronze
1948 London	Denmark; Paul Elvstrøm	United States; Ralph Evans	Netherlands; Koos de Jong

=== Flying Dutchman ===
Year	Gold	Silver	Bronze
1960 Rome	Norway; Peder Lunde Jr. Bjørn Bergvall	Denmark; Hans Fogh; Ole Erik Petersen	United Team of Germany; Rolf Mulka; Ingo von Bredow
1964 Tokyo	New Zealand; Helmer Pedersen; Earle Wells	Great Britain; Keith Musto; Tony Morgan	United States; Harry Melges; William Bentsen
1968 Mexico City	Great Britain; Rodney Pattisson; Iain MacDonald-Smith	West Germany; Ulli Libor; Peter Naumann	Brazil; Reinaldo Conrad; Burkhard Cordes
1972 Munich	Great Britain; Rodney Pattisson; Christopher Davies	France; Yves Pajot; Marc Pajot	West Germany; Ulli Libor; Peter Naumann
1976 Montreal	West Germany; Jörg Diesch; Eckart Diesch	Great Britain; Rodney Pattisson; Julian Brooke-Houghton	Brazil; Reinaldo Conrad; Peter Ficker
1980 Moscow	Spain; Alejandro Abascal; Miguel Noguer	Ireland; David Wilkins; James Wilkinson	Hungary; Szabolcs Detre; Zsolt Detre
1984 Los Angeles	United States; Jonathan McKee; William Carl Buchan	Canada; Terry McLaughlin; Evert Bastet	Great Britain; Jonathan Richards; Peter Allam
1988 Seoul	Denmark; Jørgen Bojsen-Møller; Christian Grønborg	Norway; Ole Pollen; Erik Björkum	Canada; Frank McLaughlin; John Millen
1992 Barcelona	Spain; Luis Doreste; Domingo Manrique	United States; Paul Foerster; Stephen Bourdow	Denmark; Jørgen Bojsen-Møller; Jens Bojsen-Møller

=== Monotype ===
Games	Gold	Silver	Bronze
1924 Paris	Belgium; Léon Huybrechts	Norway; Henrik Robert	Finland; Hans Dittmar

=== Lechner A-390 ===
Games	Gold	Silver	Bronze
1992 Barcelona; Women's	New Zealand; Barbara Kendall	China; Zhang Xiaodong	Netherlands; Dorien de Vries
1992 Barcelona; Men's	France; Franck David	United States; Mike Gebhardt	Australia; Lars Kleppich

=== Mistral One Design ===
Games	Gold	Silver	Bronze
1996 Atlanta; Women's	Hong Kong (HKG); Lee Lai Shan	New Zealand; Barbara Kendall	Italy; Alessandra Sensini
1996 Atlanta; Men's	Greece; Nikolaos Kaklamanakis	Argentina; Carlos Espinola	Israel (ISR); Gal Fridman
2000 Sydney; Women's	Italy; Alessandra Sensini	Germany (GER); Amelie Lux	New Zealand; Barbara Kendall
2000 Sydney; Men's	Austria; Christoph Sieber	Argentina (ARG); Carlos Espinola	New Zealand; Aaron McIntosh
2004 Athens; Women's	France; Faustine Merret	China (CHN); Yin Jian	Italy (ITA); Alessandra Sensini
2004 Athens; Men's	Israel (ISR); Gal Fridman	Greece; Nikolaos Kaklamanakis	Great Britain; Nick Dempsey

=== O-Jolle ===
Games	Gold	Silver	Bronze
1936 Berlin	Netherlands; Daan Kagchelland	Germany; Werner Krogmann	Great Britain; Peter Scott

=== Men's RS:X ===
Games	Gold	Silver	Bronze
2008 Beijing	Tom Ashley; New Zealand	Julien Bontemps; France	Shahar Tzuberi; Israel
2012 London	Dorian van Rijsselberghe; Netherlands	Nick Dempsey; Great Britain	Przemysław Miarczyński; Poland
2016 Rio de Janeiro	Dorian van Rijsselberghe; Netherlands	Nick Dempsey; Great Britain	Pierre Le Coq; France
2020 Tokyo	Kiran Badloe; Netherlands	Thomas Goyard; France	Bi Kun; China

=== Women's RS:X ===
Games	Gold	Silver	Bronze
2008 Beijing	Yin Jian; China	Alessandra Sensini; Italy	Bryony Shaw; Great Britain
2012 London	Marina Alabau; Spain	Tuuli Petäjä; Finland	Zofia Klepacka; Poland
2016 Rio de Janeiro	Charline Picon; France	Chen Peina; China	Stefania Elfutina; Russia
2020 Tokyo	Lu Yunxiu; China	Charline Picon; France	Emma Wilson; Great Britain

=== Snowbird ===
Games	Gold	Silver	Bronze
1932 Los Angeles	France; Jacques Lebrun	Netherlands; Bob Maas	Spain; Santiago Amat

=== Soling ===
Year	Gold	Silver	Bronze
1972 Kiel	United States; Buddy Melges; William Allen; William Bentsen	Sweden; Stig Wennerström; Stefan Krook; Lennart Roslund Race 1 - 4 Bo Knape Race 5 & 6	Canada; David Miller; Paul Côté; John Ekels
1976 Kingston	Denmark; Poul Richard Høj Jensen; Valdemar Bandolowski; Erik Hansen	United States; John Kolius; Walter Glasgow; Richard Hoepfner	East Germany; Dieter Below; Olaf Engelhardt; Michael Zachries
1980 Tallinn	Denmark; Poul Richard Høj Jensen; Valdemar Bandolowski; Erik Hansen	Soviet Union; Boris Budnikov; Aleksandr Budnikov; Nikolay Polyakov	Greece; Tassos Boudouris; Anastasios Gavrilis; Aristidis Rapanakis
1984 Los Angeles	United States; Robbie Haines; Ed Trevalyan; Rod Davis	Brazil; Torben Grael; Daniel Adler; Ronaldo Senfft	Canada; Hans Fogh; Steve Calder; John Kerr
1988 Busan	East Germany; Jochen Schümann; Thomas Flach; Bernd Jäkel	United States; John Kostecki; Bob Billingham; William Baylis	Denmark; Jesper Bank; Jan Mathiasen; Steen Secher
1992 Barcelona	Denmark; Jesper Bank; Jesper Seier; Steen Secher	United States; Kevin Mahaney; Jim Brady; Doug Kern	Great Britain; Lawrie Smith; Robert Cruikshank; Ossie Stewart
1996 Savannah	Germany; Jochen Schümann; Thomas Flach; Bernd Jäkel	Russia; Georgy Shayduko; Dmitry Shabanov; Igor Skalin	United States; Jeff Madrigali; Jim Barton; Kent Massey
2000 Sydney	Denmark; Jesper Bank; Henrik Blakskjær; Thomas Jacobsen	Germany; Jochen Schümann; Gunnar Bahr; Ingo Borkowski	Norway; Herman Horn Johannessen; Paul Davis; Espen Stokkeland

Medal tally
Rank	Nation	Gold	Silver	Bronze	Total
1	Denmark	4	0	1	5
2	United States	2	3	1	6
3	Germany	1	1	0	2
4	East Germany	1	0	1	2
5	Brazil	0	1	0	1
5	Russia	0	1	0	1
5	Soviet Union	0	1	0	1
5	Sweden	0	1	0	1
9	Canada	0	0	2	2
10	Great Britain	0	0	1	1
10	Greece	0	0	1	1
10	Norway	0	0	1	1
Totals (12 entries)		8	8	8	24

=== Star ===
Games	Gold	Silver	Bronze
1932 Los Angeles: Open	United States; Gilbert Gray; Andrew Libano	Great Britain; George Colin Ratsey; Peter Jaffe	Sweden; Gunnar Asther; Daniel Sundén-Cullberg
1936 Berlin: Open	Germany; Peter Bischoff; Hans-Joachim Weise	Sweden; Arvid Laurin; Uno Wallentin	Netherlands; Bob Maas; Willem de Vries Lentsch
1948 London: Male	United States; Hilary Smart; Paul Smart	Cuba; Carlos de Cárdenas; Carlos de Cárdenas Jr.	Netherlands; Adriaan Maas; Edward Stutterheim
1952 Helsinki: Open	Italy; Agostino Straulino; Nicolò Rode	United States; John Price; John Reid	Portugal; Joaquim Fiúza; Francisco de Andrade
1956 Melbourne: Open	United States; Herbert Williams; Lawrence Low	Italy; Agostino Straulino; Nicolò Rode	Bahamas; Durward Knowles; Sloane Farrington
1960 Rome: Open	Soviet Union; Timir Pinegin; Fyodor Shutkov	Portugal; Mário Quina; José Manuel Quina	United States; William Parks; Robert Halperin
1964 Tokyo: Open	Bahamas; Durward Knowles; Cecil Cooke	United States; Richard Stearns; Lynn Williams	Sweden; Pelle Petterson; Holger Sundström
1968 Mexico City: Open	United States; Lowell North; Peter Barrett	Norway; Peder Lunde Jr. Per Wiken	Italy; Franco Cavallo; Camillo Gargano
1972 Munich: Open	Australia; David Forbes; John Anderson	Sweden; Pelle Petterson; Stellan Westerdahl	West Germany; Wilhelm Kuhweide; Karsten Meyer
1980 Moscow: Open	Soviet Union (URS); Valentin Mankin; Aleksandr Muzychenko	Austria; Hubert Raudaschl; Karl Ferstl	Italy (ITA); Giorgio Gorla; Alfio Peraboni
1984 Los Angeles	United States; William Earl Buchan; Steven Erickson	West Germany; Joachim Griese; Michael Marcour	Italy; Giorgio Gorla; Alfio Peraboni
1988 Seoul: Open	Great Britain; Michael McIntyre; Bryn Vaile	United States; Mark Reynolds; Harold Haenel	Brazil; Torben Grael; Nelson Falcão
1992 Barcelona: Open	United States; Mark Reynolds; Harold Haenel	New Zealand; Rod Davis; Don Cowie	Canada; Ross MacDonald; Eric Jespersen
1996 Atlanta: Open	Brazil; Torben Grael; Marcelo Ferreira	Sweden; Hans Wallén; Bobby Lohse	Australia; Colin Beashel; David Giles
2000 Sydney: Open	United States; Mark Reynolds; Magnus Liljedahl	Great Britain; Ian Walker; Mark Covell	Brazil; Torben Grael; Marcelo Ferreira
2004 Athens: Male	Brazil; Torben Grael; Marcelo Ferreira	Canada; Ross MacDonald; Mike Wolfs	France; Pascal Rambeau; Xavier Rohart
2008 Beijing: Male	Great Britain; Iain Percy; Andrew Simpson	Brazil; Robert Scheidt; Bruno Prada	Sweden; Fredrik Lööf; Anders Ekström
2012 London: Male	Sweden; Fredrik Lööf; Max Salminen	Great Britain; Iain Percy; Andrew Simpson	Brazil; Robert Scheidt; Bruno Prada

=== Swallow ===
Games	Gold	Silver	Bronze
1948 London	Great Britain; Stewart Morris; David Bond	Portugal; Duarte de Almeida Bello; Fernando Pinto Coelho Bello	United States; Lockwood Pirie; Owen Torrey

=== Tempest ===
Games	Gold	Silver	Bronze
1972 Munich	Soviet Union (URS); Valentin Mankin; Vitali Dyrdyra	Great Britain; Alan Warren; David Hunt	United States; Glen Foster; Peter Dean
1976 Montreal	Sweden; John Albrechtson; Ingvar Hansson	Soviet Union (URS); Valentin Mankin; Vladyslav Akimenko	United States; Dennis Conner; Conn Findlay

=== Ton Classes ===
==== 0 to .5 ton ====
Games	Gold	Silver	Bronze
1900 Paris; Race: 1	France; Pierre Gervais	France; François Texier; Auguste Texier; Jean-Baptiste Charcot; Robert Linzeler	France; Henri Monnot; Léon Tellier; Gaston Cailleux
1900 Paris; Race: 2	France; Émile Sacré	France; François Texier; Auguste Texier; Jean-Baptiste Charcot; Robert Linzeler	France; Pierre Gervais

==== .5 to 1 ton ====
Games	Gold	Silver	Bronze
1900 Paris; Race: 1	Great Britain; Lorne Currie; John Gretton; Linton Hope; Algernon Maudslay	France; Jules Valton; Félix Marcotte; William Martin; Jacques Baudrier; Jean Le Bret	France; Émile Michelet; Marcel Meran
1900 Paris; Race: 2	France; Louis Auguste-Dormeuil	France; Émile Michelet; Marcel Meran	France; Jules Valton; Félix Marcotte; William Martin; Jacques Baudrier; Jean Le Bret

==== 1 to 2 ton ====
Games	Gold	Silver	Bronze
1900 Paris; Race: 1	Switzerland (SUI); Hermann de Pourtalès; Hélène de Pourtalès; Bernard de Pourtalès	France; François Vilamitjana; Auguste Albert; Albert Duval; Charles Hugo	France; Jacques Baudrier; Lucien Baudrier; Dubosq; Édouard Mantois
1900 Paris; Race: 2	Germany (GER); Paul Wiesner; Georg Naue; Heinrich Peters; Ottokar Weise	Switzerland (SUI); Hermann de Pourtalès; Hélène de Pourtalès; Bernard de Pourtalès	France; François Vilamitjana; Auguste Albert; Albert Duval; Charles Hugo

==== 2 to 3 ton ====
Games	Gold	Silver	Bronze
1900 Paris; Race: 1	France; William Exshaw (GBR); Frédéric Blanchy; Jacques Le Lavasseur	France; Léon Susse; Jacques Doucet; Auguste Godinet; Henri Mialaret	France; Ferdinand Schlatter; Gilbert de Cotignon; Émile Jean-Fontaine
1900 Paris; Race: 2	France; William Exshaw (GBR); Frédéric Blanchy; Jacques Le Lavasseur	France; Léon Susse; Jacques Doucet; Auguste Godinet; Henri Mialaret	France; Auguste Donny

==== 3 to 10 ton ====
Games	Gold	Silver	Bronze
1900 Paris; Race: 1	France; Henri Gilardoni	Netherlands; Henri Smulders; Chris Hooijkaas; Arie van der Velden	France; Maurice Gufflet; A. Dubois; J. Dubois; Robert Gufflet; Charles Guiraist
1900 Paris; Race: 2	Great Britain; Howard Taylor; Edward Hore; Harry Jefferson	France; Maurice Gufflet; A. Dubois; J. Dubois; Robert Gufflet; Charles Guiraist	United States (USA); H. MacHenry

==== 10 to 20 ton ====
Games	Gold	Silver	Bronze
1900 Paris	France; Émile Billard; Paul Perquer	France; Jean, duc Decazes	Great Britain; Edward Hore

==== 20+ ton ====
Games	Gold	Silver	Bronze
1900 Paris	Great Britain; Cecil Quentin	Great Britain; Selwin Calverley	United States (USA); Harry Van Bergen

==== Open class ====
Games	Gold	Silver	Bronze
1900 Paris	Great Britain; Lorne Currie; John Gretton; Linton Hope; Algernon Maudslay	Germany (GER); Paul Wiesner; Georg Naue; Heinrich Peters; Ottokar Weise	France; Émile Michelet

=== Tornado ===
Games	Gold	Silver	Bronze
1976 Montreal	Great Britain; Reginald White; John Osborn	United States; David McFaull; Michael Rothwell	West Germany (FRG); Jörg Spengler; Jörg Schmall
1980 Moscow	Brazil (BRA); Lars Sigurd Bjorkström; Alexandre Welter	Denmark (DEN); Peter Due; Per Kjergard	Sweden; Göran Marström; Jörgen Ragnarsson
1984 Los Angeles	New Zealand; Rex Sellers; Chris Timms	United States; Randy Smyth; Jay Glaser	Australia; Christopher Cairns; John Anderson
1988 Seoul	France; Jean Le Deroff; Nicolas Hénard	New Zealand; Chris Timms; Rex Sellers	Brazil (BRA); Lars Grael; Clinio Freitas
1992 Barcelona	France; Yves Loday; Nicolas Hénard	United States; Randy Smyth; Keith Notary	Australia; Mitch Booth; John Forbes
1996 Atlanta	Spain; Fernando León; José Luis Ballester	Australia; Mitch Booth; Andrew Landenberger	Brazil; Lars Grael; Henrique Pellicano
2000 Sydney	Austria; Roman Hagara; Hans-Peter Steinacher	Australia; Darren Bundock; John Forbes	Germany; Roland Gäbler; René Schwall
2004 Athens	Austria; Roman Hagara; Hans-Peter Steinacher	United States; John Lovell; Charlie Ogletree	Argentina; Santiago Lange; Carlos Espínola
2008 Beijing	Spain; Antón Paz; Fernando Echávarri	Australia; Darren Bundock; Glenn Ashby	Argentina; Santiago Lange; Carlos Espínola

=== Windglider ===
Games	Gold	Silver	Bronze
1984 Los Angeles	Netherlands; Stephan van den Berg	United States; Scott Steele	New Zealand; Bruce Kendall

=== Yngling ===
Games	Gold	Silver	Bronze
2004 Athens	Great Britain; Shirley Robertson; Sarah Webb; Sarah Ayton	Ukraine; Ruslana Taran; Ganna Kalinina; Svitlana Matevusheva	Denmark; Dorte Jensen; Helle Jespersen; Christina Otzen
2008 Beijing	Great Britain; Sarah Ayton; Sarah Webb; Pippa Wilson	Netherlands; Mandy Mulder; Annemieke Bes; Merel Witteveen	Greece; Sofia Bekatorou; Virginia Kravarioti; Sofia Papadopoulou
