= Sailing at the 1912 Summer Olympics =

Sailing at the Games of the V Olympiad
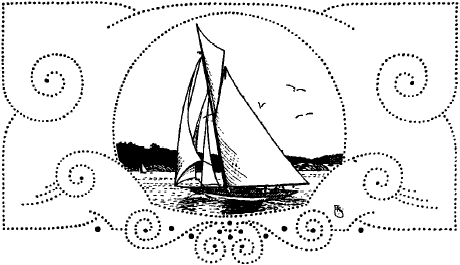
- Yachting Bookmark in the Official Report of the Olympic Games of Stockholm 1912
- Venues: Nynäshamn
- Dates: First race: 19 July 1912; Last race: 22 July 1912
- Competitors: 118 from 6 nations
- Boats: 26

Sailing/Yachting is an Olympic sport starting from the Games of the 1st Olympiad (1896 Olympics in Athens, Greece). With the exception of 1904 and the canceled 1916 Summer Olympics, sailing has always been included on the Olympic schedule. The Sailing program of 1912 consisted of a total of four sailing classes (disciplines). For each class two races were scheduled from 19 July 1912 to 22 July 1912 off the coast of Nynäshamn at the Baltic Sea.

== Venue ==
Royal Swedish Yacht Club
- Kungliga Svenska Segelsällskapet
- Burgee of Royal Swedish Yacht Club

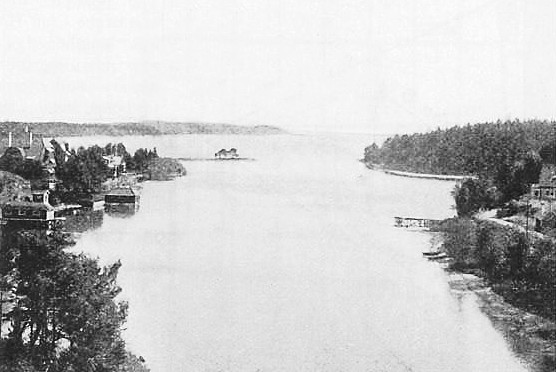
- Interactive map of the Royal Swedish Yacht Club area

General information
- Type: Olympic harbor
- Location: Nynäshamn, Sweden
- Coordinates: 58°54′30″N 17°57′30″E
- Elevation: Sealevel

When Sweden was assigned to host the 1912 Olympic Games two cities wanted to be the venue for the sailing program. Gothenburg and Stockholm. Gothenburg claimed that it was a much shorter passage for the oversees entries (about 525 nautical miles (972 km)) than it was to Stockholm. Stockholm however got the sailing program because of then all Olympic events should be in the same vicinity. As specific location Nynäshamn, about 60 kilometres (37 mi) from Stockholm was chosen.

The Royal Swedish Yacht Club was requested to organize the sailing event. Discussions took place whether the races would take place at the same time period of the other Olympic events. Finally the decision was taken to hold them just after the other Olympic events. Also several other races were organized in conjunction of the Olympic races.

=== Course area ===
An inner and an outer course was created of the coast of Nynäshamn:

1912 Olympic Course Area & courses

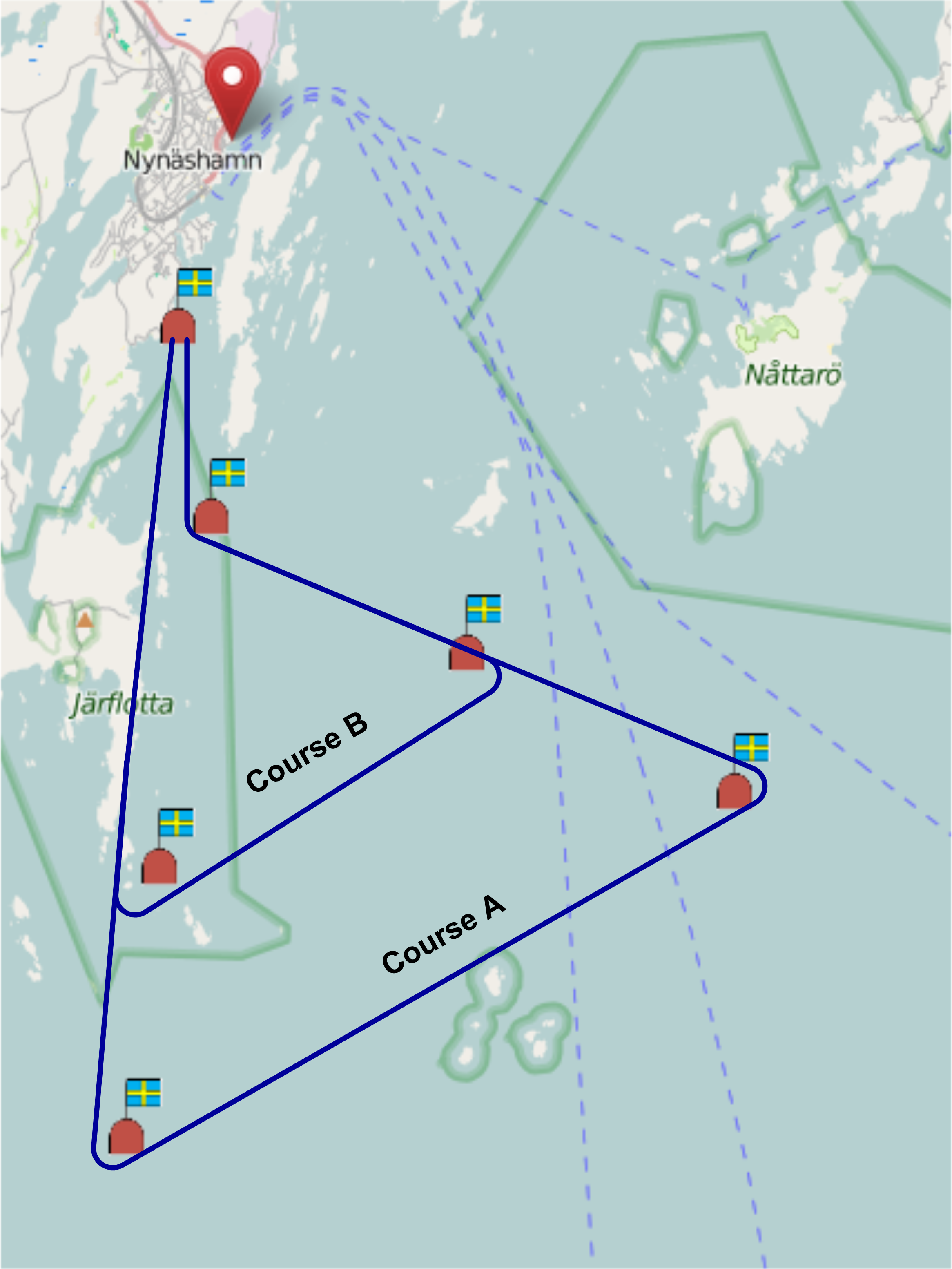
Course A was used for the 10 and the 12 Metre, Course B for the 6 and 8 Metre.

== Competition ==
=== Overview ===
Continents	Countries	Classes	Entries	Male	Female
1	6	4	26	118	0

A maximum of 2 boats per country per class was allowed.

=== Continents ===
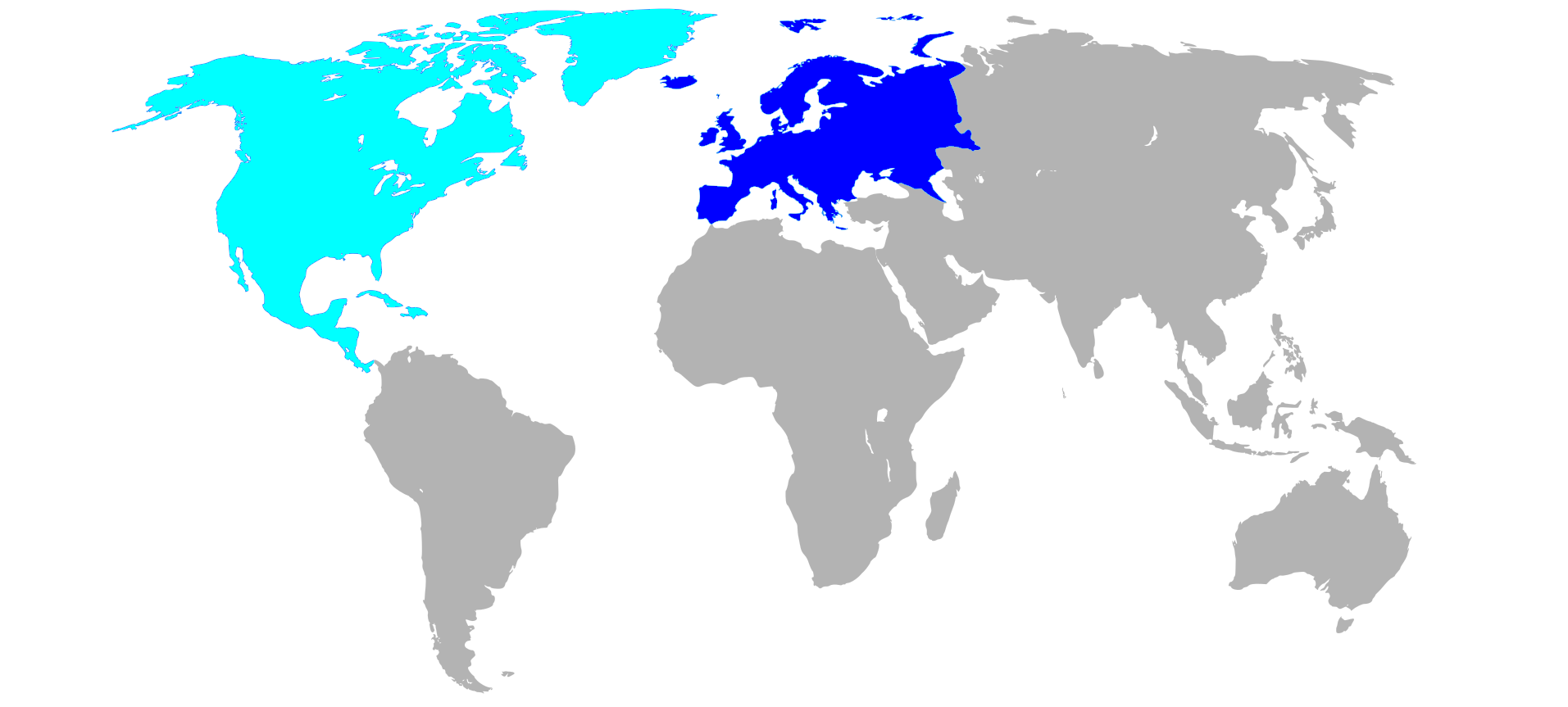
Map of Participating Sailing Continents at the 1912 Summer Olympics ● Green = Participating for the first time ● Blue = Participating ● Light Blue = Have previously participated

● Europe

=== Countries ===
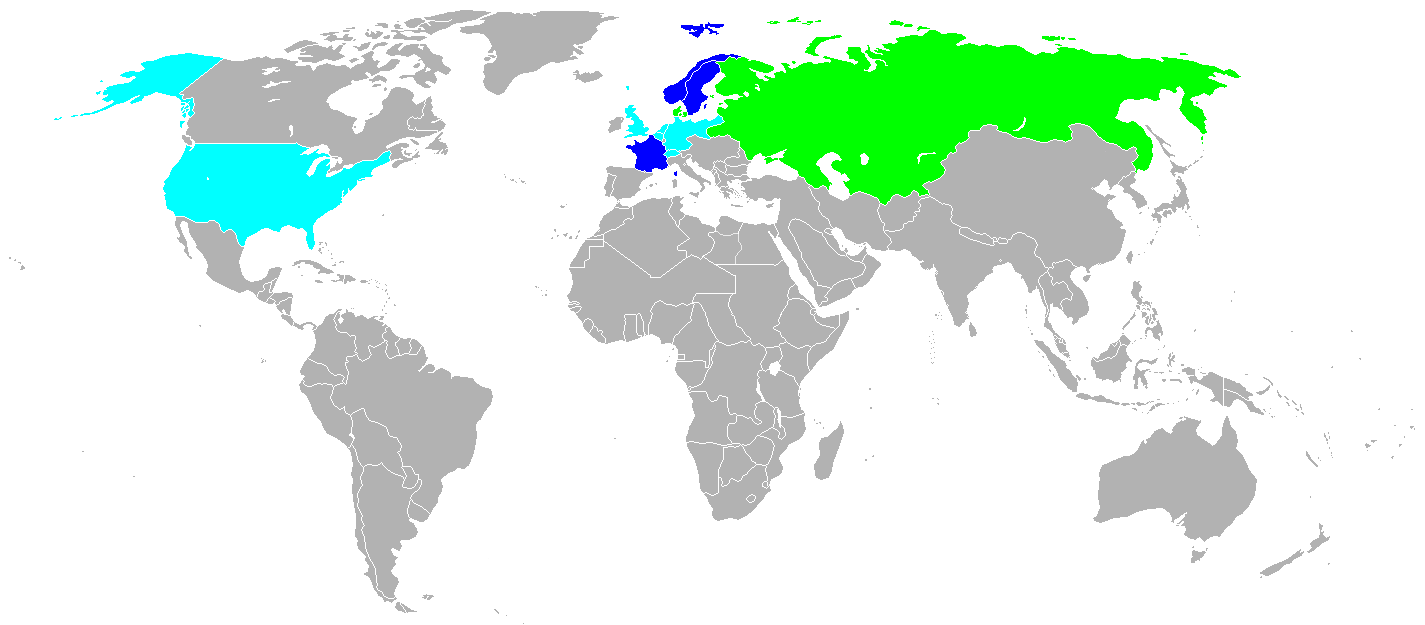
Map of Participating Sailing Countries at the 1912 Summer Olympics ● Green = Participating for the first time ● Blue = Participating ● Light Blue = Have previously participated

- Denmark (3)
- Finland (27)
- France (3)
- Norway (18)
- Russian Empire (17)
- Sweden (41)

=== Classes (equipment) ===
Source: Although one of the oldest organized sporting activities, sailing in the early first part of the 20th century was not uniformly organized. This had a lot to do with national traditions as well as with the fact that there were no standardized boat types with uniform building instructions and measurements. Also a lot of development was done in the area of boat design and boat building. The shape of a boat, specifically its length, its weight and its sail area, are major parameters that determine the boat's speed. Several initiatives were started to create a formula that made it possible to have boats race each other without having to calculate the final result. But the different countries initially could not agree on an international system. At the Olympics of 1900 it was clear that sailing was not ready for international competition, and something had to be done.

In 1906 international meetings were organize to solve the problem. Finally in Paris, October 1907 the first International Rule was ratified. Delegates from this meeting went on to form the International Yacht Racing Union (IYRU), the precursor to the present International Sailing Federation (ISAF).

The agreed formula gives a result in meters (Metre). During the meeting in 1907 the IOC made the decision to open the 1908 Summer Olympics for the following Metre classes:

Class	Type	Venue	Event	Sailors	First OG	Olympics so far
6 Metre	Keelboat	Nynäshamn		3	1908	2
8 Metre	Keelboat	Nynäshamn		5	1908	2
10 Metre	Keelboat	Nynäshamn		8	1912	1
12 Metre	Keelboat	Nynäshamn		10	1908	2
Legend: = Mixed gender event
The 1912 Olympic Classes in action 6 Metre 8 Metre 10 Metre 12 Metre

== Race schedule ==
●	Opening ceremony	●	Event competitions	●	Tie breakers	●	Closing ceremony

Date	July								
Date	19 Fri	20 Sat	21 Sun	22 Mon	23 Tue	24 Wed	25 Thu	26 Fri	27 Sat
Sailing		● ● ● ●	● ● ● ●	● ● ● ●		International races			
Total gold medals									
Ceremonies	●								●

== Medal summary ==
Event	Gold	Silver	Bronze
1912: 6 Metre	France (FRA); Gaston Thubé; Amédée Thubé; Jacques Thubé	Denmark (DEN); Hans Meulengracht-Madsen; Steen Herschend; Sven Thomsen	Sweden (SWE); Eric Sandberg; Otto Aust; Harald Sandberg
1912: 8 Metre	Norway (NOR); Thoralf Glad; Thomas Aass; Andreas Brecke; Torleiv Corneliussen; Christian Jebe	Sweden (SWE); Bengt Heyman; Emil Henriques; Alvar Thiel; Herbert Westermark; Nils Westermark	Finland (FIN); Bertil Tallberg; Arthur Ahnger; Emil Lindh; Gunnar Tallberg; Georg Westling
1912: 10 Metre	Sweden (SWE); Filip Ericsson; Carl Hellström; Paul Isberg; Humbert Lundén; Herman Nyberg; Harry Rosenswärd; Erik Wallerius; Harald Wallin	Finland (FIN); Harry Wahl; Waldemar Björkstén; Jacob Björnström; Bror Brenner; Allan Franck; Erik Lindh; Juho Aarne Pekkalainen	Russian Empire (RUS); Esper Beloselsky; Ernest Brasche; Karl Lindholm; Nikolay Pushnitsky; Aleksandr Rodionov; Iosif Shomaker; Philipp Strauch
1912: 12 Metre	Norway (NOR); Johan Anker; Nils Bertelsen; Eilert Falch-Lund; Halfdan Hansen; Arnfinn Heje; Magnus Konow; Alfred Larsen; Petter Larsen; Christian Staib; Carl Thaulow	Sweden (SWE); Nils Persson; Per Bergman; Dick Bergström; Kurt Bergström; Hugo Clason; Folke Johnson; Sigurd Kander; Ivan Lamby; Erik Lindqvist; Hugo Sällström	Finland (FIN); Ernst Krogius; Ferdinand Alfthan; Pekka Hartvall; Jarl Hulldén; Sigurd Juslén; Eino Sandelin; Johan Silén

== Medal tables ==
Rank	Nation	Gold	Silver	Bronze	Total
1	Norway	2	0	0	2
2	Sweden	1	2	1	4
3	France	1	0	0	1
4	Finland	0	1	2	3
5	Denmark	0	1	0	1
Totals (5 entries)		4	4	3	11

The official report used a points system to rank participating nations in the sport:

Rank	Country	Gold		Silver		Bronze		Total	
Rank	Country	Medals	Points	Medals	Points	Medals	Points	Medals	Points
1	Sweden	1	3	2	4	1	1	4	8
2	Norway	2	6	0	0	0	0	2	6
3	Finland	0	0	1	2	2	2	3	4
4	France	1	3	0	0	0	0	1	3
5	Denmark	0	0	1	2	0	0	1	2
6	Russian Empire	0	0	0	0	1	1	1	1
Total		4		4		4		12	

== Other information ==
- This Olympic sailing event was gender independent, but turned out to be a Men-only event.
- 6 Metre owner Dan Broström became Swedish Naval Minister from 1914 to 1917.
- The 12 Metre Heatherbell was the first 12-Metre built in the UK under the new First International Rule. She was designed by Thomas Glen-Coats, and built by Alexander Robertson & Sons, Sandbank Scotland, in 1907.
- The Swedish 8 Metre K.S.S.S. is often referred to as the lottery boat. Obvious this boat was built from lottery funds.

=== Sailors ===
During the sailing regattas at the 1912 Summer Olympics among others the following persons were competing in the various classes:

- Norway, Johan Anker, Multiple Olympic competitor and designer of many Metre yachts as well as the 1948 Olympic Dragon, in the 12 Metre
- Sweden, Dan Broström, Swedish Naval Minister from 1914 to 1917
Sailors at the 1912 Olympic Games
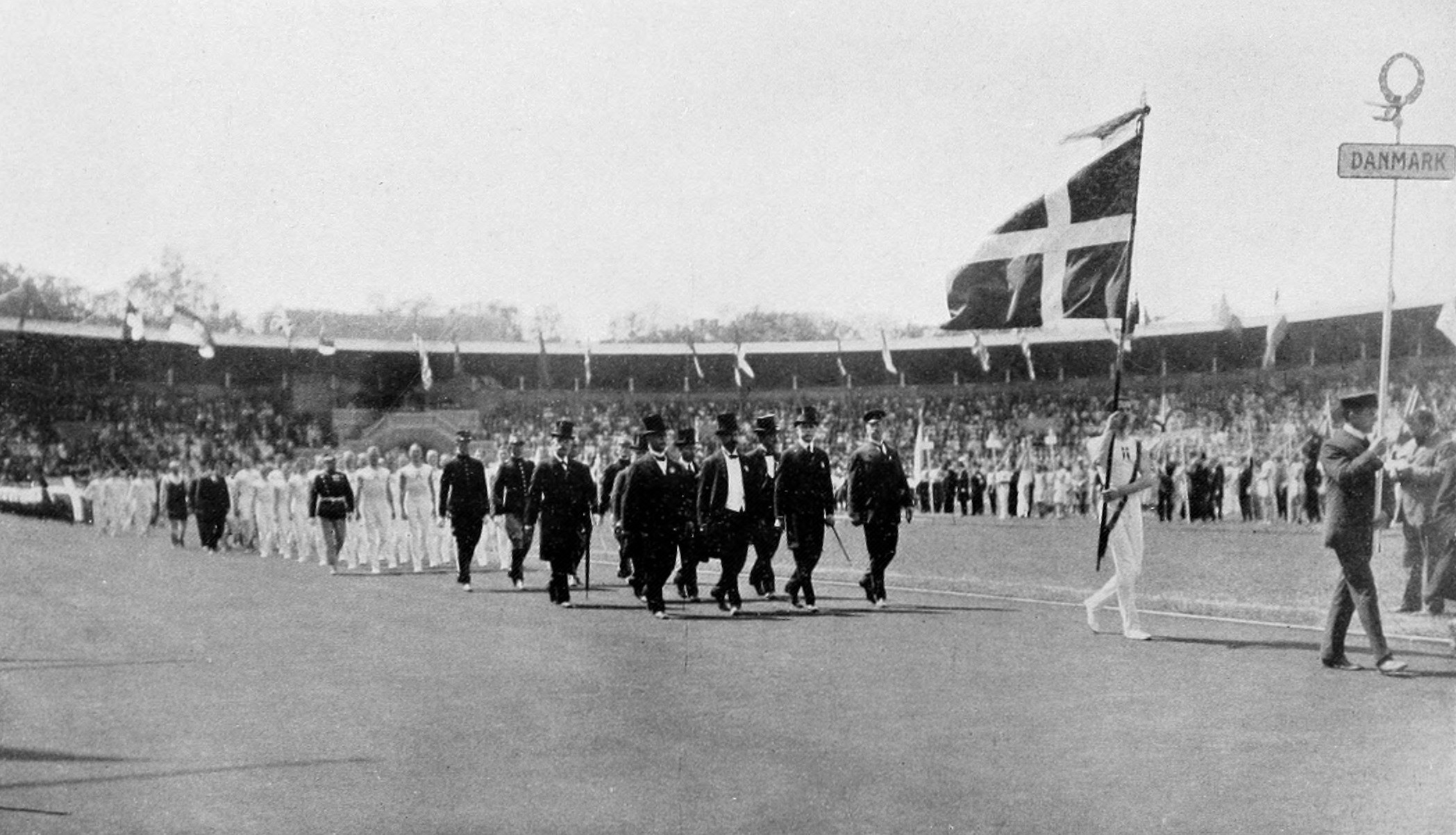
Danish team at the opening ceremony

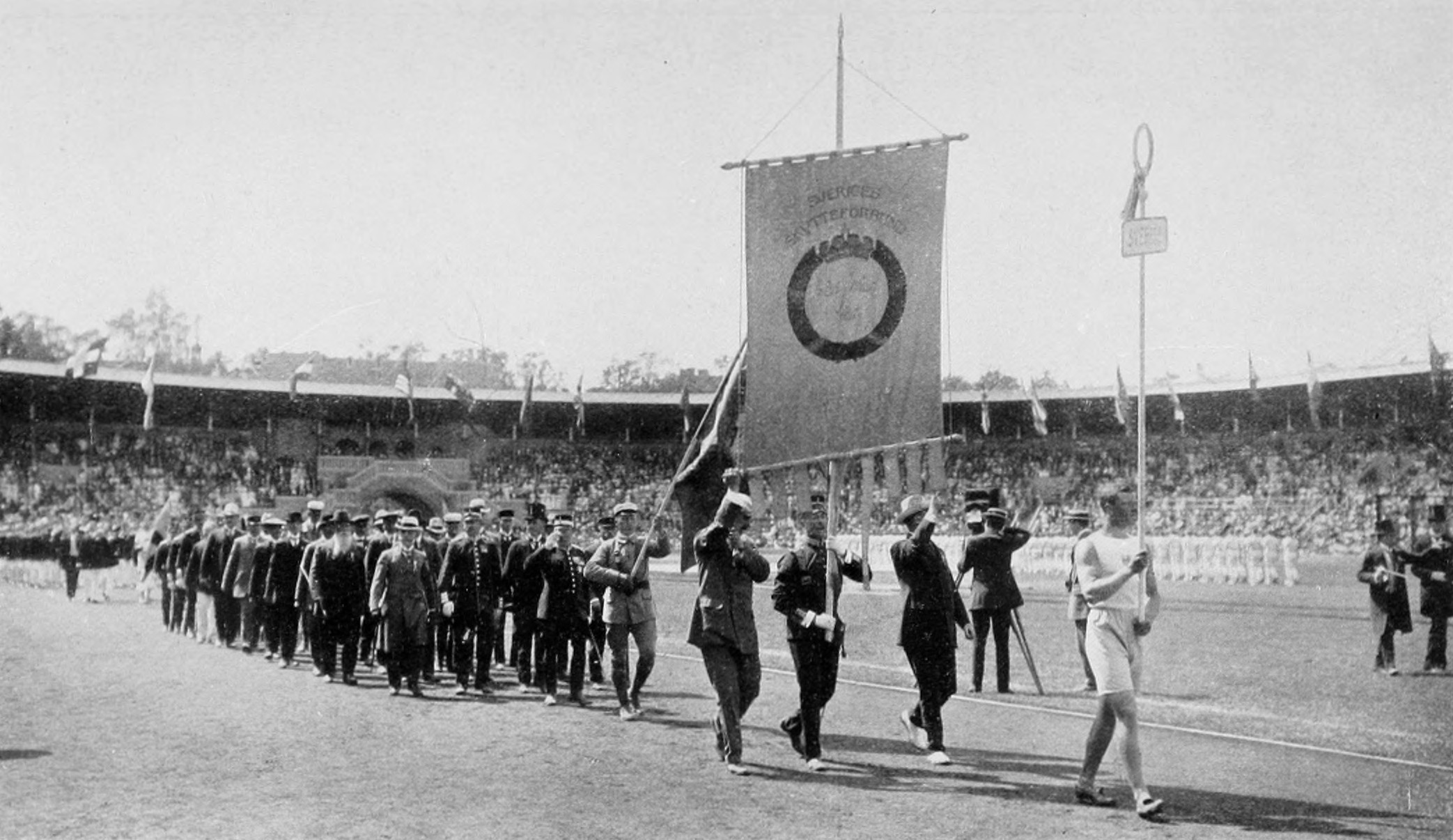
Swedish team at the opening ceremony

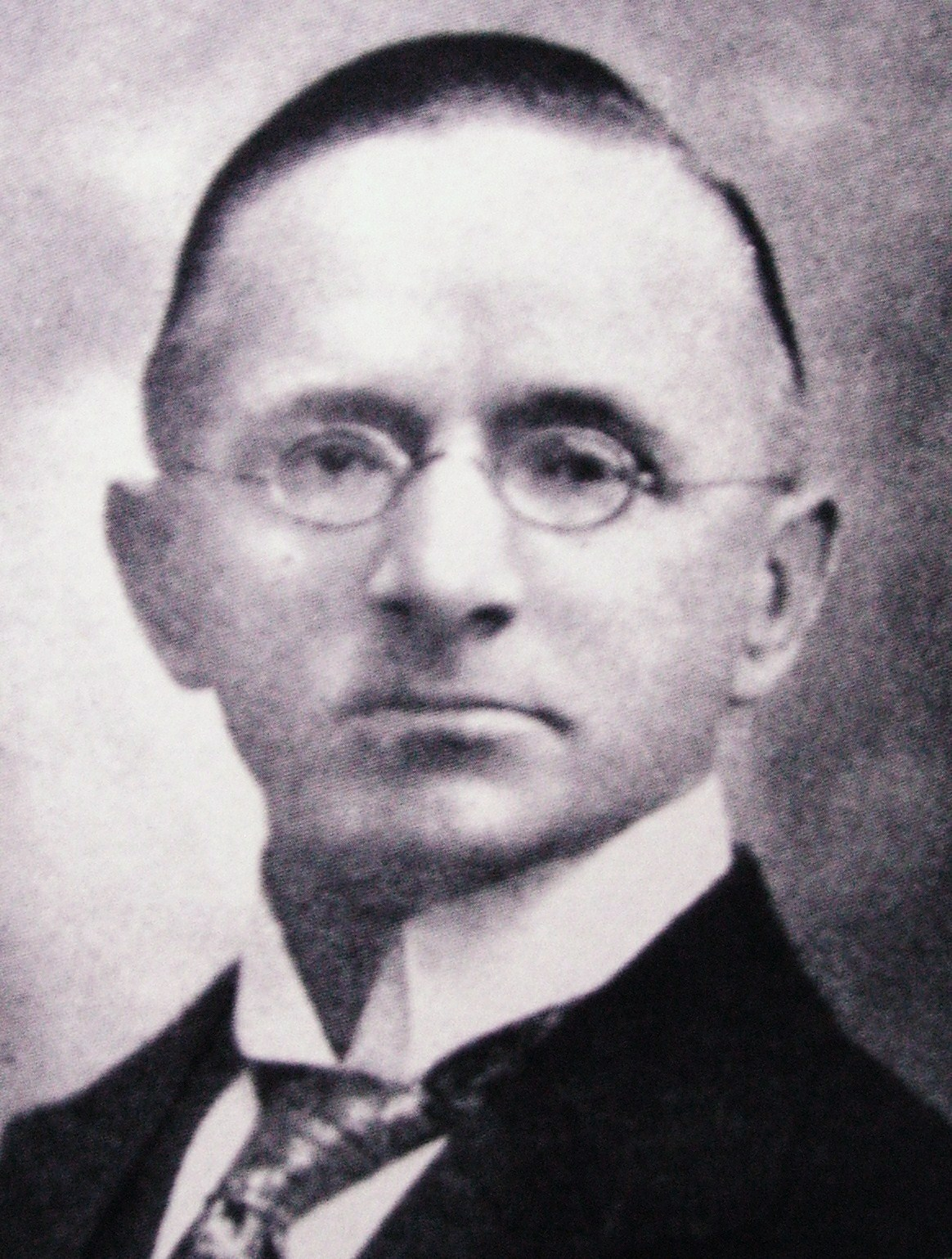
Dan Broström:
Owner of the 6 Metre Kirsten

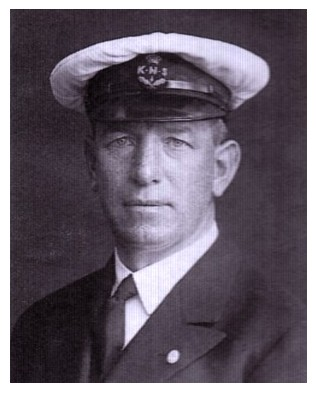
In 12 Metre:
Halfdan Hansen

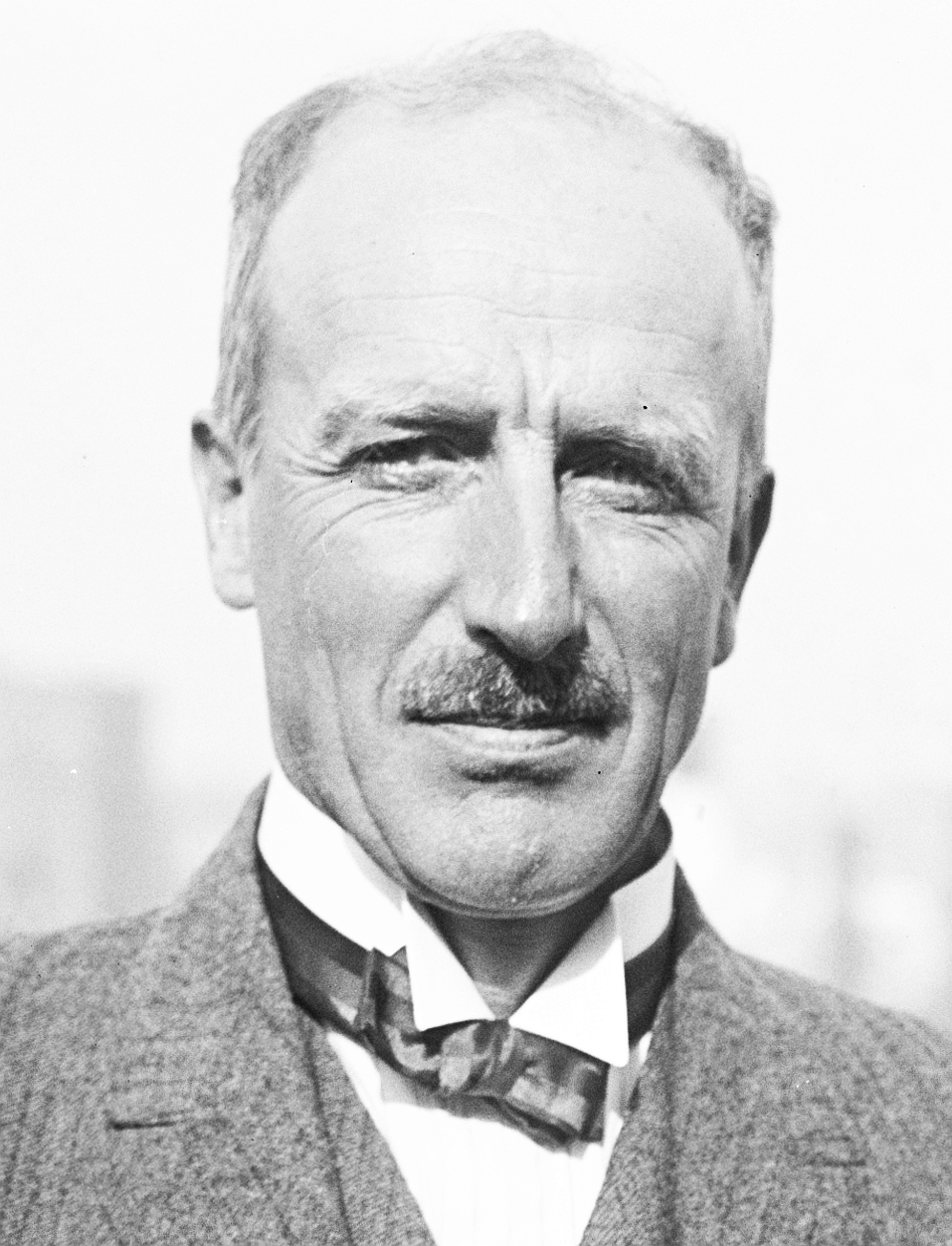
In 12 Metre:
Johan Anker

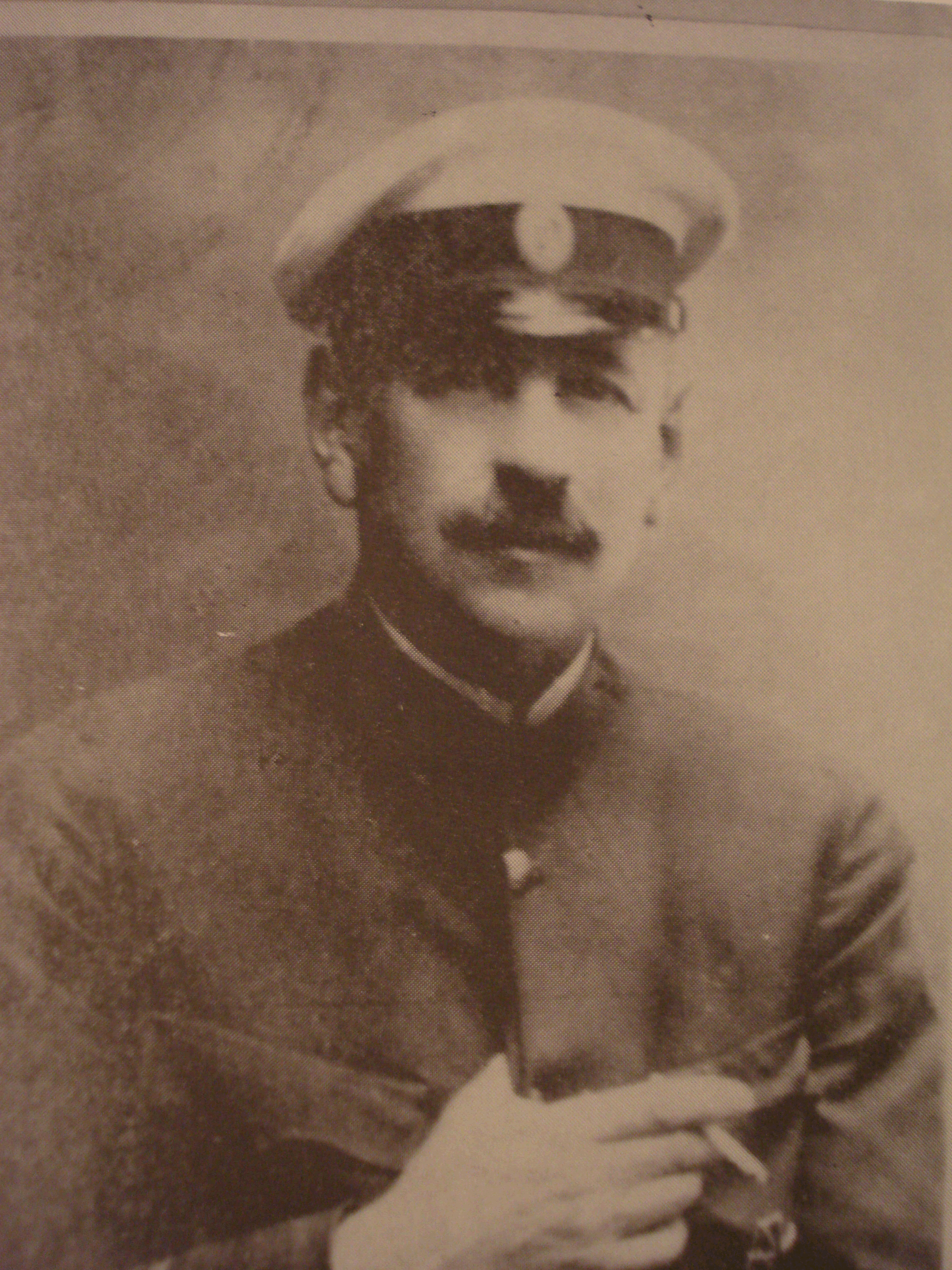
In 10 Metre:
Esper Belosselsky-Belozersky
