= 10 Metre =

Yacht Racing Class

Development
- Design: Development class

Boat
- Crew: 8
- Draft: 2.2 m (7 ft 3 in)

Hull
- Hull weight: 12,000 kg (26,000 lb)
- LOA: 16.5 m (54 ft)
- LWL: 11 m (36 ft)
- Beam: 3 m (9.8 ft)

The International Ten Metre Class is a construction class, meaning that the boats are not identical but are all designed to meet specific measurement formula, in this case International Rule. At their heyday, Metre Classes were the most important group of international yacht racing classes, and they are still actively raced around the world. "Ten" in class name does not, somewhat confusingly, refer to length of the boat, but product of the formula; 10 Metre boats are, on average, 16.5 meters long.

== History ==
The 10 Metre was used as an Olympic Class during the 1912 and 1920 Olympics. The International Rule was set up in 1907 to replace earlier, simpler handicap system which were often local or at best, national, and often also fairly simple, producing extreme boats which were fast but lightly constructed and impractical. The rule changes several times in history. About 20 boats were built.

== Rule development ==
=== 1907 Rule ===
Used from 1907 to 1920

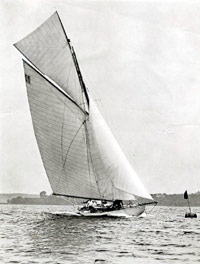

$$10.000 \mbox{ metres} = \frac{L + B + 1/3G +3d + 1/3\sqrt{S} - F}{2}$$

where

- $L$ = waterline length (LWL)
- $B$ = beam
- $G$ = chain girth
- $d$ = difference between girth and chain
- $S$ = sail area
- $F$ = freeboard

=== 1919 Rule ===
Used from 1920 to 1933

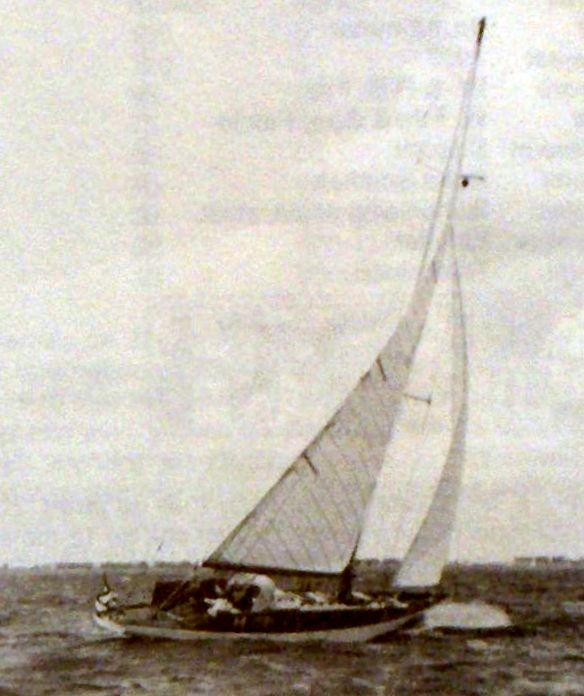

$$10.000 \mbox{ metres} = \frac{L + 0.25G +2d + \sqrt{S} - F}{2.5}$$

where

- $L$ = waterline length (LWL)
- $G$ = chain girth
- $d$ = difference between girth and chain
- $S$ = sail area
- $F$ = freeboard

== Events ==
=== Olympics ===
Event	Gold	Silver	Bronze
1912 Stockholm	Sweden (SWE); Filip Ericsson; Carl Hellström; Paul Isberg; Humbert Lundén; Herman Nyberg; Harry Rosenswärd; Erik Wallerius; Harald Wallin	Finland (FIN); Harry Wahl; Waldemar Björkstén; Jacob Björnström; Bror Brenner; Allan Franck; Erik Lindh; Juho Aarne Pekkalainen	Russia (RUS); Esper Beloselsky; Ernest Brasche; Karl Lindholm; Nikolay Pushnitsky; Aleksandr Rodionov; Iosif Shomaker; Philipp Strauch
1920 Antwerp; 1907 rule	Norway (NOR); Erik Herseth; Gunnar Jamvold; Petter Jamvold; Claus Juell; Sigurd Holter; Ingar Nielsen; Ole Sørensen	No further competitors	No further competitors
1920 Antwerp; 1919 rule	Norway (NOR); Charles Arentz; Otto Falkenberg; Robert Giertsen; Willy Gilbert; Halfdan Schjött; Trygve Schjøtt; Arne Sejersted	No further competitors	No further competitors
