= Olympic sailing classes =

Yachts used in yachting and sailing category of the Olympic Summer Games

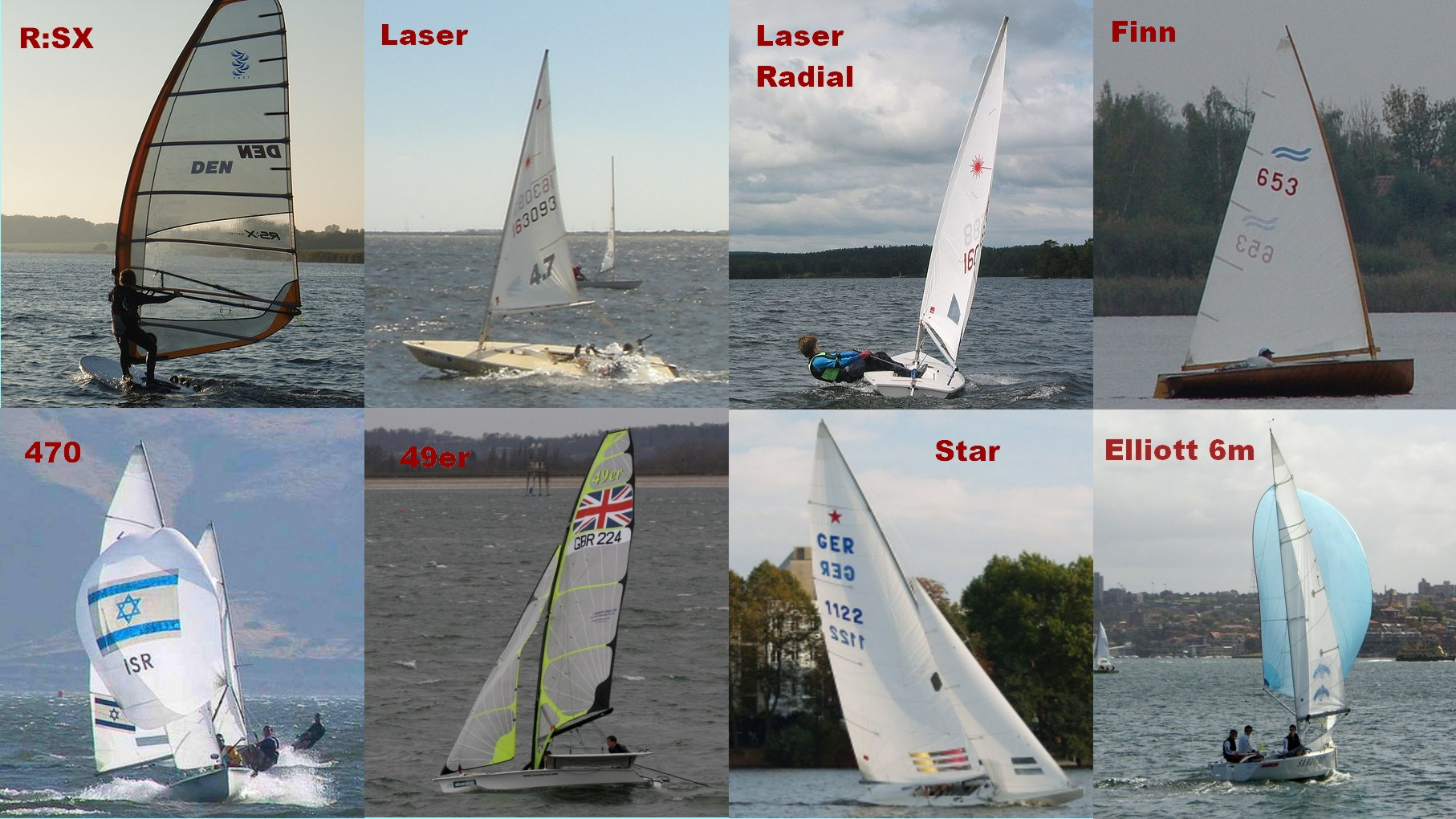
The eight Olympic classes scheduled in London 2012.

The Olympic sailing classes have been used in the sport of Sailing/Yachting during the Olympic Summer Games since 1896. Since then, 46 different classes have been used.

== History ==
Over a period of more than 112 years, in a sport that uses complex technical equipment, classes will be discontinued for use at the Olympics. Reasons for discontinuation of a class varied from economical, logistical and technological to emotional and even political. Some of the discontinued classes remain very strong International - or National classes. Others filled a niche in a specific area like sailing schools or local club racing. Some faded away.

The "Former Olympic Sailing Classes", together with their crews form an important and significant part of the history of sailing in general and Olympic Sailing in particular. These tables give an overview of the classes and when they were used for Olympic sailing.

== Current Olympic Classes ==
Category	Class	1976	1980	1984	1988	1992	1996	2000	2004	2008	2012	2016	2020	2024	2028
Dinghy	470	•	•	•	M&F	M&F	M&F	M&F	M&F	M&F	M&F	M&F	M&F	Mix	Mix
Dinghy	49er							P	P	P	P	M	M	M	M
Dinghy	49er FX											F	F	F	F
Dinghy	Laser Standard(ILCA7)						•	•	•	M	M	M	M	M	M
Dinghy	Laser Radial (ILCA6)									F	F	F	F	F	F
Multihull	Nacra 17											Mix	Mix	Mix	Mix
Sailboard	IQFoil													M&F	M&F
Kiteboard	Formula Kite													M&F	M&F

== Discontinued Olympic Classes ==
=== Pre-WWII games (1900–1936) ===
Category	Class	1900	1904	1908	1912	1920	1924	1928	1932	1936
Ton classes	1/2 Ton	•								
Ton classes	1/2–1 Ton	•								
Ton classes	1–2 Ton	•								
Ton classes	2–3 Ton	•								
Ton classes	3–10 Ton	•								
Ton classes	10–20 Ton	•								
Ton classes	Open	•								
Square Meter; Skerry Cruiser classes	30m^{2}					•				
Square Meter; Skerry Cruiser classes	40m^{2}					•				
Jauge chemin de fer classes	6.5 Metre					•				
Jauge chemin de fer classes	8.5 Metre					•				
Metre classes	6 Metre			•	•	•	•	•	•	•
Metre classes	7 Metre			•		•				
Metre classes	8 Metre			•	•	•	•	•	•	•
Metre classes	9 Metre					•				
Metre classes	10 Metre				•	•				
Metre classes	12 Metre			•	•	•				
Metre classes	15 Metre					•				
Monotype classes	12 foot dinghy					•		•		
Monotype classes	18 foot dinghy					•				
Monotype classes	French National Monotype 1924						•			
Monotype classes	Snowbird								•	
Monotype classes	O-Jolle									•
Keelboat	Star								•	•

=== Post-WWII games (1948—2020) ===
Category	Class	1948	1952	1956	1960	1964	1968	1972	1976	1980	1984	1988	1992	1996	2000	2004	2008	2012	2016	2020
Dinghy	Firefly	•																		
Dinghy	12m^{2} Sharpie			•																
Dinghy	Flying Dutchman				•	•	•	•	•	•	•	•	•							
Dinghy	Europe												F	F	F	F				
Dinghy	Finn		•	•	•	•	•	•	•	•	•	•	H	H	H	H	HM	HM	HM	HM
Keelboat	6 Metre	•	•																	
Keelboat	Swallow	•																		
Keelboat	5.5 Metre		•	•	•	•	•													
Keelboat	Dragon	•	•	•	•	•	•	•												
Keelboat	Elliott 6																	Fm		
Keelboat	Soling							•	•	•	•	•	C	C	C					
Keelboat	Star	•	•	•	•	•	•	•		•	•	•	•	•	•	M	M	M		
Keelboat	Tempest							•	•											
Keelboat	Yngling															F	F			
Multihull	Tornado								•	•	•	•	•	•	•	•	•			
Sailboard	Windglider										M									
Sailboard	Division II											M								
Sailboard	Lechner A–390												M&F							
Sailboard	Mistral One Design Class													M&F	M&F	M&F				
Sailboard	RS:X																M&F	M&F	M&F	M&F

== Legend ==
- ( • ) Open Class event (Male and Female)
- ( M ) Male event
- ( F ) Female event
- ( Fm ) Female Matchrace event
- ( C ) Combined open event (Fleetrace and Matchrace)
- ( Mix ) Mixed (e.g. One Male & One Female Crew)
- ( H ) Heavyweight Dinghy event
- ( P ) High Performance Dinghy event

== See also ==
- Sailing at the Summer Olympics
- Sailboarding at the Olympics
- ISAF Sailing World Championships
- International Sailing Federation
- Vintage Yachting Games
