= Sailing at the 1912 Summer Olympics – 10 Metre =

10-Metre at the Games of the V Olympiad
- Line drawing of the 10-Metre
- Venue: Nynäshamn
- Dates: First race: 20 July 1912; Last race: 22 July 1912
- Competitors: 28 from 3 nations
- Teams: 4

Medalists
1st place, gold medalist(s)		Filip Ericsson, Carl Hellström, Paul Isberg, Humbert Lundén, Herman Nyberg, Harry Rosenswärd, Erik Wallerius, Harald Wallin	Sweden
2nd place, silver medalist(s)		Harry Wahl, Waldemar Björkstén, Jacob Björnström, Bror Brenner, Allan Franck, Erik Lindh, Juho Aarne Pekkalainen	Finland
3rd place, bronze medalist(s)		Esper Beloselsky, Ernst Brasche, Karl Lindholm, Nikolay Pushnitsky, Aleksandr Rodionov, Joseph von Schomacker, Philipp Strauch	Russian Empire

The 10 Metre was a sailing event on the Sailing at the 1912 Summer Olympics program in Nynäshamn. Two races were scheduled plus eventual sail-off's. 28 sailors, on 4 boats, from 3 nation entered.

== Race schedule ==
●	Opening ceremony	●	Event competitions	●	Tie breakers	●	Closing ceremony

Date	July								
Date	19 Fri	20 Sat	21 Sun	22 Mon	23 Tue	24 Wed	25 Thu	26 Fri	27 Sat
10-Metre		●	●	●		International races			
Total gold medals				1					
Ceremonies	●								●

== Course area and course configuration ==
For the 10-Metre Course A was used.

1912 Olympic Course Area & courses
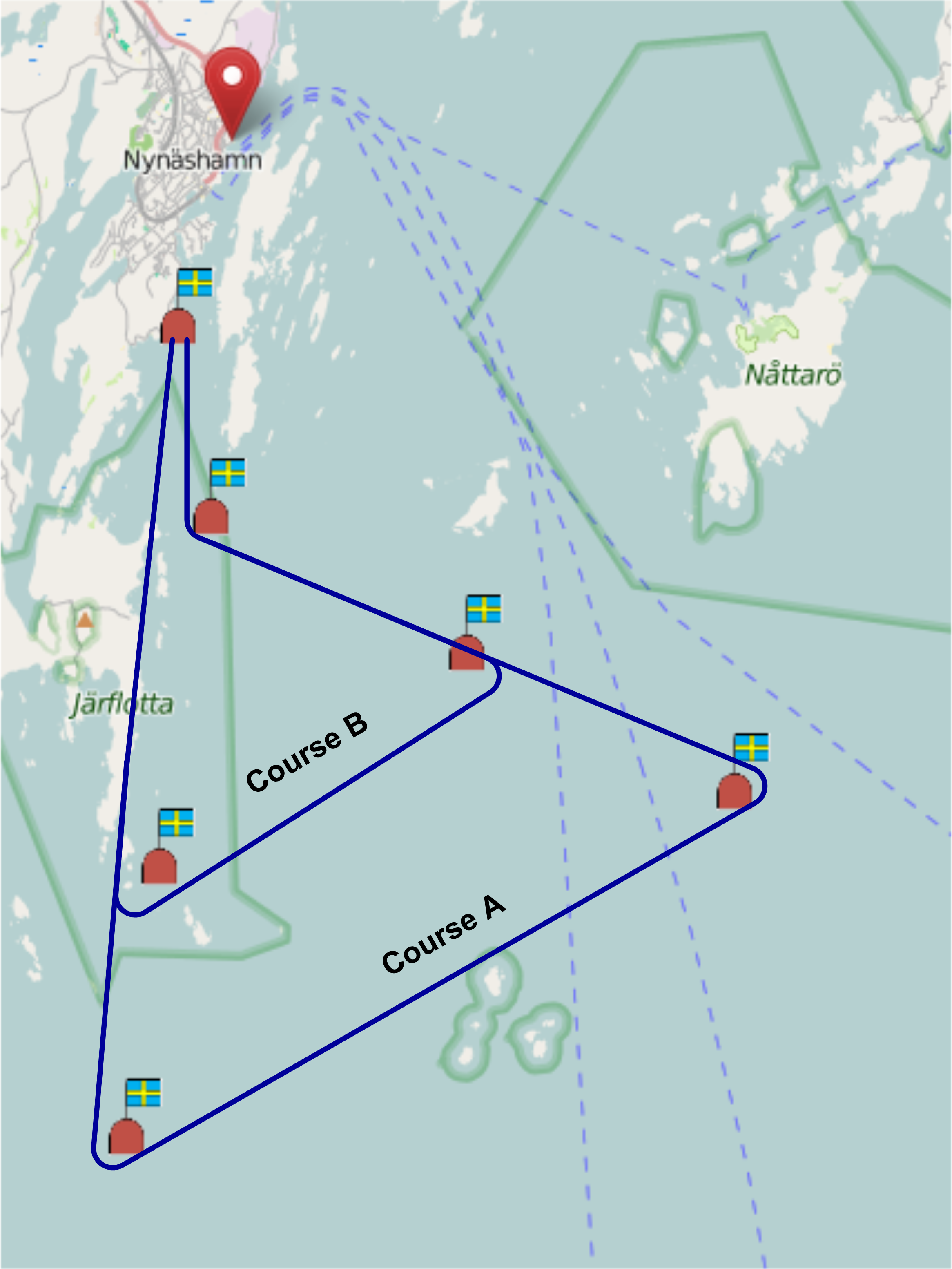

== Weather conditions ==
Date	Race	Description	Wind speed	Wind direction	Start
20-JUL-1912	1	Beautiful weather with a light easterly breeze.	5 knots (9.3 km/h) - 9 knots (17 km/h)		11:15
21-JUL-1912	2	Only a light breeze was blowing in the morning.	4 knots (7.4 km/h) - 6 knots (11 km/h)		11:15
22-JUL-1912	3	As beautiful as could be with very light winds	5 knots (9.3 km/h) - 7 knots (13 km/h)		11:00

== Final results ==
The 1912 Olympic scoring system was used. All competitors were male.

Rank	Country	Helmsman	Crew	Boat	Race 1		Race 2		Race 3	
Rank	Country	Helmsman	Crew	Boat	Pos.	Pts.	Pos.	Pts.	Pos.	Pts.
1	Sweden	Filip Ericsson	Carl Hellström; Paul Isberg; Humbert Lundén; Herman Nyberg; Harry Rosenswärd; Erik Wallerius; Harald Wallin	Kitty (designed by Alfred Mylne)	3:46:04	7	3:43:51	7		
2	Finland	Harry Wahl	Waldemar Björkstén; Jacob Björnström; Bror Brenner; Allan Franck; Erik Lindh; Juho Aarne Pekkalainen	Nina	3:59:07	3	3:50:09	1	4:21:41	7
3	Russian Empire	Iosif Shomaker	Esper Beloselsky; Ernest Brasche; Karl Lindholm; Nikolay Pushnitsky; Aleksandr Rodionov; Philipp Strauch	Gallia II	3:59:20	1	3:45:38	3	4:23:17	3
4	Sweden	Wilhelm Forsberg	Bertil Bothén; Björn Bothén; Erik Lindén; Arvid Perslow; Erik Waller	Marga	4:01:11	0	3:50:30	0		

- There was one sail-off between Nina and Gallia II for place 2 & 3.

== Daily standings ==
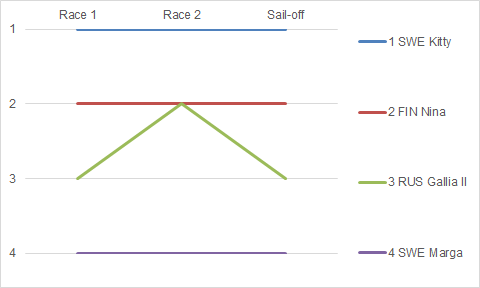
Graph showing the daily standings in the 10 Metre during the 1912 Summer Olympics

== Notes ==
In the 10 Metre was chosen for this Olympics above the 7 Metre since 10 Metre outnumbered the 7 Metre in boats build.

== Other information ==
=== Prizes ===
The following Commemorative Plaque were handed out by the Royal Swedish Yacht Club to the owners of:

1. Kitty: Nils Asp
2. Nina: Harry Wahl
3. Gallia II: Aleksandr Vyshnegradsky
