= Fred Forsberg =

Fred Forsberg may refer to:

- Fred Forsberg (sailor) (1862–1939), Swedish sailor
- Fred Forsberg (American football) (born 1944), former American football player
