= Björn Bothén =

Swedish sailor (1893–1955)

Personal information
- Born: 26 April 1893 Gothenburg, Sweden
- Died: 19 August 1955 (aged 62) Gothenburg, Sweden
- Relatives: Bertil Bothén (brother)

Achievements and titles
- Olympic finals: 1912 Summer Olympics, 4th place

Björn Bothén (26 April 1893 – 19 August 1955) was a Swedish sailor who competed in the 1912 Summer Olympics. In 1912 he was a crew member of the Swedish boat Marga which finished fourth in the 10 metre class competition.

Bothén was born in Gothenburg, Sweden, on 26 April 1893 and is brother to Bertil Bothén, a fellow Marga crew member. Björn Bothén died on 19 August 1955 in Gothenburg at the age of 62.
