= Erik Lindén =

Erik Lindén may refer to:

- Erik Lindén (wrestler)
- Erik Lindén (sailor)
