= Bertil Bothén =

Swedish sailor (1892–1966)

Personal information
- Born: 14 July 1892 Gothenburg, Sweden
- Died: 23 March 1966 (aged 73) Gothenburg, Sweden
- Relatives: Björn Bothén (brother)

Achievements and titles
- Olympic finals: 1912 Summer Olympics, 4th place

Bertil "Bo" Bothén (14 July 1892 – 23 March 1966) was a Swedish sailor who competed in the 1912 Summer Olympics. He was a crew member of the Swedish boat Marga which finished fourth in the 10 metre class competition at those Olympic Games.

Bothén was born in Gothenburg, Sweden, on 14 July 1892 and was the elder brother to Björn Bothén, a fellow Marga crew member. Bo Bothén died on 23 March 1966 in Gothenburg at the age of 73.
