= Aleksandr Rodionov =

Russian sailor

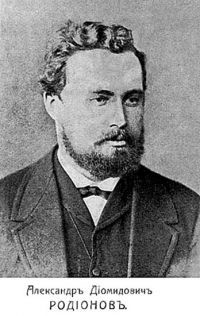

Personal information
- Full name: Aleksandr Diomidovich Rodionov
- Nationality: Russian

Sport

Sailing career
- Class: 10 Metre
- Club: in 1912: St. Petersburg River Yacht Club, Санкт-Петербургский речной яхт-клуб
Medal record
Sailing
Representing Russia
Olympic Games
Bronze medal – third place	1912 Nynäshamn	10 Metre
- Updated on 7 February 2015

Aleksandr Diomidovich Rodionov (Russian: Александр Диомидович Родионов) was a sailor from Russia. He died before 1910. Who represented his native country at the 1912 Summer Olympics in Nynäshamn, Sweden. Rodionov took the bronze in the 10 Metre.

== Sources ==
- Evans, Hilary; Gjerde, Arild; Heijmans, Jeroen; Mallon, Bill; et al. "Aleksandr Rodionov". Olympics at Sports-Reference.com. Sports Reference LLC. Archived from the original on 3 December 2016.
- Swedish Olympic Committee (1913). Erik Bergvall (ed.). The Olympic Games of Stockholm 1912 – Official Report (PDF). Wahlström & Widstrand. Archived from the original (PDF) on 29 October 2012.
