= Karl Lindholm =

Russian sailor

Personal information
- Full name: Karl Fredrik Lindholm
- Nationality: Finnish
- Born: 5 May 1860 Turku
- Died: 4 February 1917 (aged 56) Saint Petersburg

Sport

Sailing career
- Class: 10 Metre
- Club: St. Petersburg River Yacht Club
Medal record
Sailing
Representing Russia
Olympic Games
Bronze medal – third place	1912 Stockholm	10 Metre

Karl Fredrik Lindholm (Russian: Карл Карлович Линдхольм, romanized: Karl Karlovich Lindkholm; 5 May 1860 – 4 February 1917) was a sailor from the Grand Duchy of Finland, who participated as part of the Russian imperial sailing team at the 1912 Summer Olympics in Nynäshamn, Sweden.

Lindholm was born in Turku, and he was a Swedish-speaking Finn. In 1912, Lindholm and his six team members took a bronze medal for the Russian Empire in the 10 Metre regatta. He then lived in Saint Petersburg, Russian Empire, and this team of the local yacht club was his team.

== Sources ==
- "Karl Lindholm Bio, Stats, and Results". Olympic Sports. Sports-Reference.com. Archived from the original on 17 April 2020.
- Swedish Olympic Committee (1913). Bergvall, Erik (ed.). The Olympic Games of Stockholm 1912 – Official Report (PDF). Wahlström & Widstrand. Archived from the original (PDF) on 2 May 2015.
