= Philipp Strauch (sailor) =

Russian sailor

Personal information
- Full name: Philipp Strauch
- Nationality: Russian Empire
- Born: Philipp Theodor Strauch; 8 August 1862
- Died: 3 October 1924 (aged 62)

Sailing career
- Sport: Sailing
- Club: in 1912: St. Petersburg River Yacht Club
- Class: 10 Metre
Medal record
Sailing
Representing Russia
Olympic Games
Bronze medal – third place	1912 Stockholm	10 Metre
- Updated on 5 July 2016

Philipp Strauch (8 August 1862 – 3 October 1924) was a sailor from the Russian Empire, who represented his native country at the 1912 Summer Olympics in Nynäshamn, Sweden. Strauch took the bronze in the 10 Metre.

== Sources ==
- "Philipp Strauch Bio, Stats, and Results". Olympic Sports. Sports-Reference.com. Archived from the original on 17 April 2020.
- Swedish Olympic Committee (1913). Erik Bergvall (ed.). The Olympic Games of Stockholm 1912 – Official Report (PDF). Wahlström & Widstrand. Archived from the original (PDF) on 29 October 2012.
