= Arvid Perslow =

Swedish sailor

Karl Arvid Perslow (September 16, 1880 – July 4, 1931) was a Swedish sailor who competed in the 1912 Summer Olympics. In 1912, he was a crew member of the Swedish boat Marga, which finished fourth in the 10 metre class competition.
