= Sailboarding at the Summer Olympics =

Windsurfing has been one of the Olympic sailing events at the Summer Olympics since 1984 for men and 1992 for women. All sailors use the same One Design boards, daggerboards, fins and sails. The equipment is chosen to allow racing in a wide range of sailing conditions, as during the Olympic Games events must take place as scheduled.

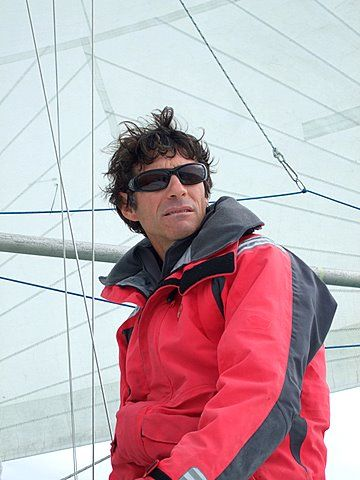
NZer Bruce Kendall, Olympic sailboarding medalist 1988, 1992

== Years and equipment ==
- 1984 Summer Olympics (Los Angeles): Windglider
- 1988 Summer Olympics (Seoul): Lechner Division II
- 1992 Summer Olympics (Barcelona): Lechner A-390
- 1996 Summer Olympics (Atlanta): Mistral One Design
- 2000 Summer Olympics (Sydney): Mistral One Design
- 2004 Summer Olympics (Athens): Mistral One Design

2004, Men's sailboard, 2004, Women's sailboard,

- 2008 Summer Olympics (Beijing): Neil Pryde RS:X

2008, Men's sailboard, 2008, Women's sailboard

- 2012 Summer Olympics (London): Neil Pryde RS:X

2012, Men's sailboard, 2012, Women's sailboard

- 2016 Summer Olympics (Rio): Neil Pryde RS:X
- 2020 Summer Olympics (Tokyo): Neil Pryde RS:X
- 2024 Summer Olympics (Paris): iQFOiL
- 2028 Summer Olympics (Los Angeles): iQFOiL

== Individual windsurfers ==
Multiple medal winners include Alessandra Sensini and Barbara Kendall and Nick Dempsey with three medals; and Bruce Kendall (brother of Barbara Kendall) and Dorian van Rijsselberghe and Michael Gebhardt and Nikolas kaklamanakis and Gal Fridman and CarlosEspinosa with two medals. See List of Olympic medalists in sailing by class. Olympic sailboarders are included in Category:Olympic sailors.

== Current Olympic Windsurfing Class - the International iQFOiL Class ==
The iQFOiL Class is the Olympic Windsurfing discipline chosen to represent the sport at the Paris 2024 and Los Angeles 2028 Olympic Games.

The iQFOiL board, equipped with a hydrofoil, is the centerpiece of this class. The hydrofoil creates lift as the windsurfer builds up speed, enabling them to fly above the water's surface, reaching incredible speeds and creating a dynamic spectacle for spectators.

As the current Olympic windsurfing class, iQFOiL embodies fairness and equality. It operates as a one design class, ensuring that all competitors use the same standardized equipment. This promotes fair competition and highlights the skill and tactics of the athletes rather than equipment advantages.

The iQFOiL Class collaborates with industry-leading partners like Starboard to promote sustainability and environmental stewardship. Together, they aim to protect the oceans, reduce carbon footprints, and support a greener future for the sport.
