= Tuuli Petäjä-Sirén =

Finnish windsurfer (born 1983)

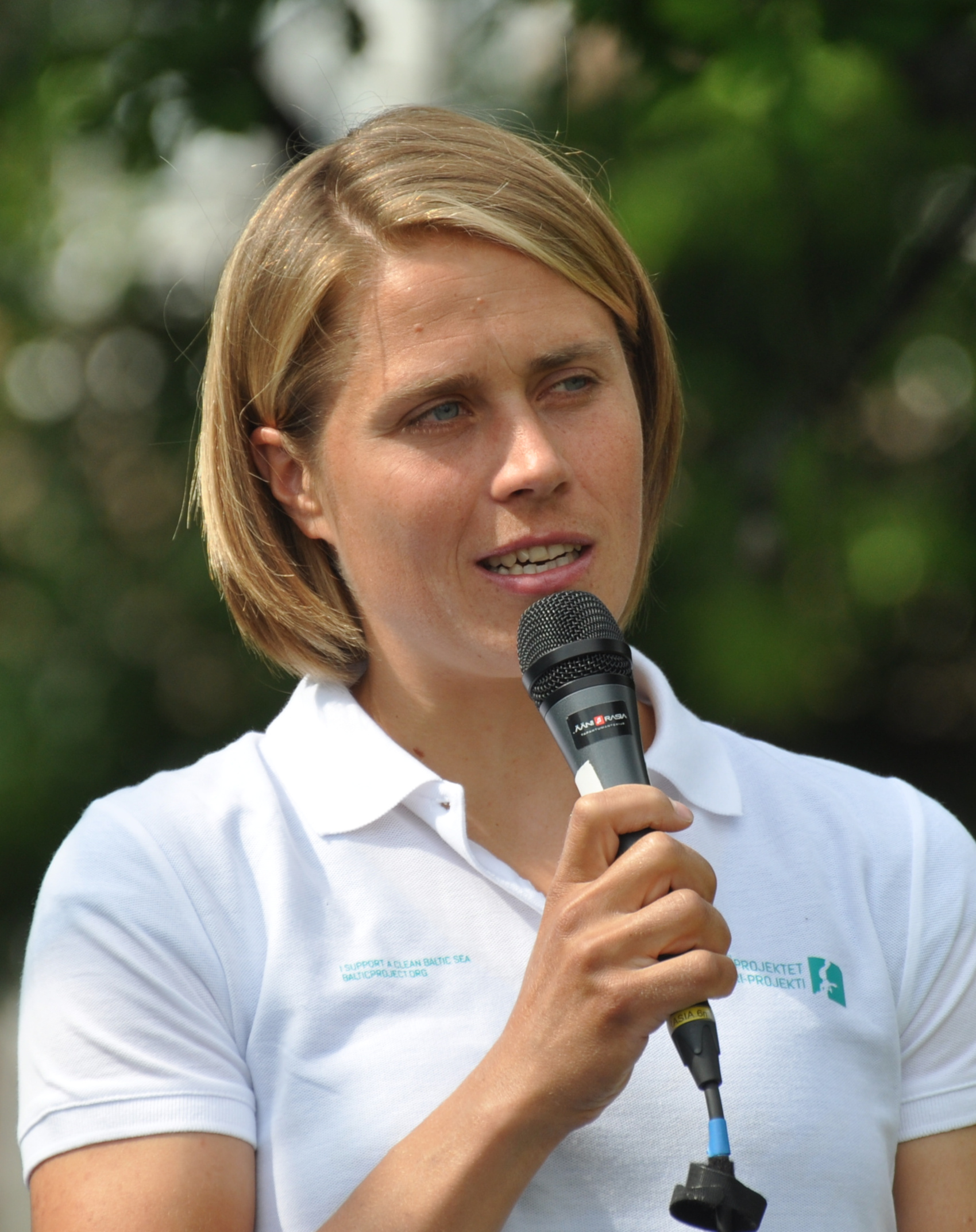
- Tuuli Petäjä-Sirén in 2015

Personal information
- Full name: Tuuli Pauliina Petäjä-Sirén
- Born: 9 November 1983 (age 42) Espoo, Finland
- Height: 169 cm (5 ft 7 in)
- Weight: 60 kg (132 lb)

Sailing career
- Sport: Sailing
Medal record
Windsurfing
Representing Finland
Olympic Games
Silver medal – second place	2012 London	Women's RS:X

Tuuli Pauliina Petäjä-Sirén (born 9 November 1983 in Espoo) is a Finnish windsurfer. She won a silver medal at the 2012 Summer Olympics in the women's RS:X. She was chosen as athlete of the year in Finland in 2012.

At the opening ceremony of the 2016 Summer Olympics Petäjä-Sirén was chosen to carry the Finnish flag. She finished 10th in the women's RS:X. At the 2020 Summer Olympics, she competed once again in the women's RS:X, and finished 14th.

Olympic Games
Preceded by Hanna-Maria Seppälä	Flagbearer for Finland; Rio de Janeiro 2016	Succeeded by Satu Mäkelä-Nummela & Ari-Pekka Liukkonen
