= Esper Beloselsky =

Russian sailor (1871–1921)

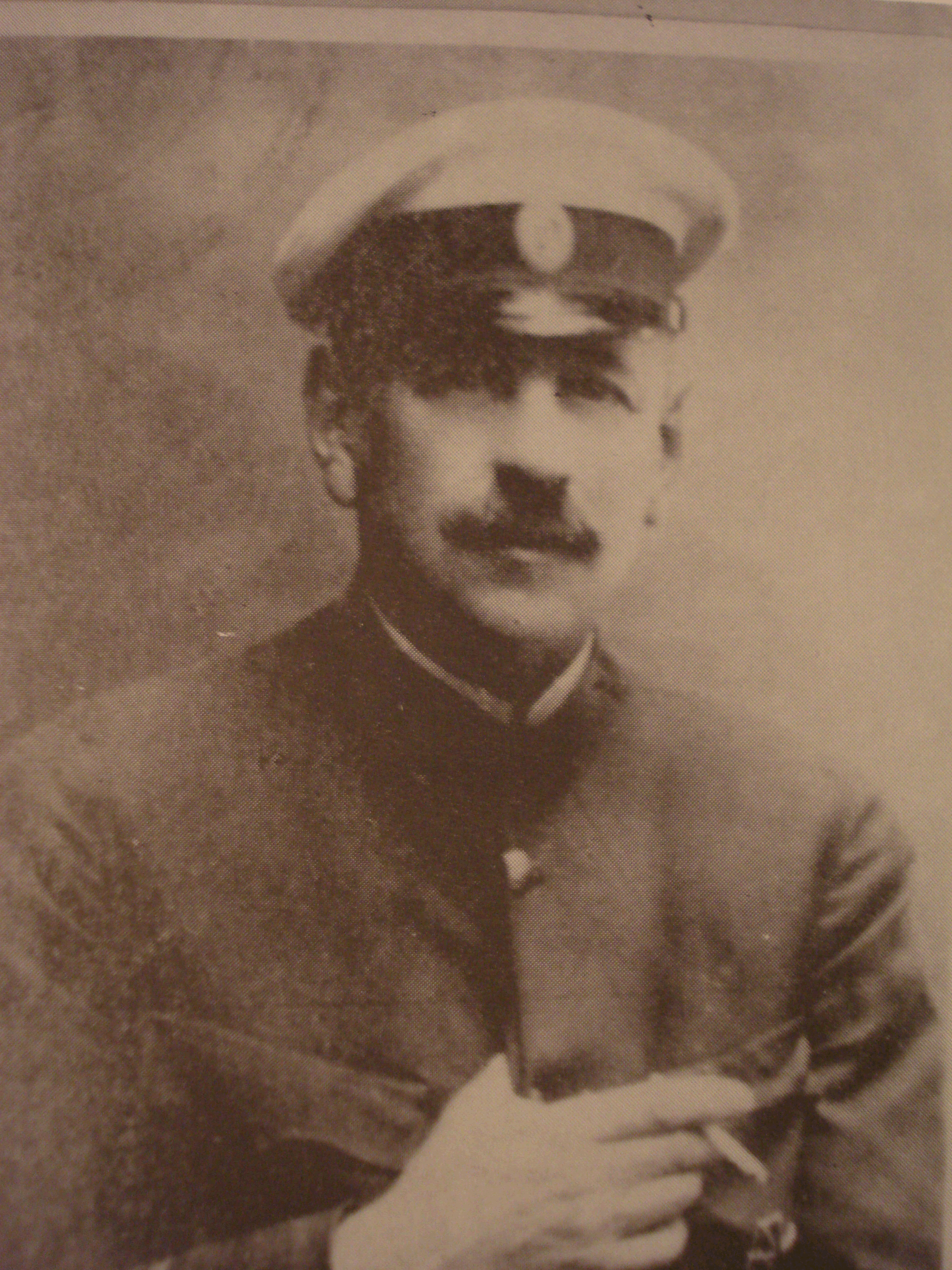

Personal information
- Full name: Esper Konstantinovich Beloselsky-Belozersky
- Born: Эспер Константинович Белосельский-Белозерский; 8 October 1871 St. Petersburg, Russia
- Died: 5 January 1921 (aged 50) Paris, France

Sport

Sailing career
- Class: 10 Metre
- Club: in 1912: St. Petersburg River Yacht Club, Санкт-Петербургский речной яхт-клуб
Medal record
Sailing
Representing Russia
Olympic Games
Bronze medal – third place	1912 Nynäshamn	10 Metre
- Updated on 17 October 2016

Prince Esper Konstantinovich Beloselsky-Belozersky (20 October 1870 – 5 January 1921) was a Russian prince and sailor who represented his native country at the 1912 Summer Olympics in Nynäshamn, Sweden. Beloselsky took the bronze in the 10 Metre.

His brother Sergei was member of the International Olympic Committee.

== Biography ==
Prince Esper Konstantinovich was an officer of the Baltic Fleet in the elite "Guarde-Marine" corps and had served as an officer on the imperial yachts Alexandria and Polar Star (both had served the Emperor and his family until the Standart was built, after which the more modern of the older two, the Polar Star served exclusively the Dowager Empress, Maria Feodorovna, mother of Nikolai II). During the violent first mutinies by the Baltic Fleet's sailors, based in Kronstadt island naval base outside of Petrograd, Esper Konstantinovich barely avoided capture – and likely murder – by the sailors.

Together with his two young sons, Georges and Paul Esperovich, their mother Madeleine Jakovlena (née Moulin), and nannies and household servants, he fled to Finland at first, during Revolution of the 1917. Together with the rest of the extended family at that time in Finland, they awaited developments until it was clear that there was little hope to return to Russia. They made their way to Paris in late 1919. Meanwhile, Esper Konstantinovich's oldest son Konstantin Esperovich, a freshly promoted 18-year-old ensign of the Horse Guards, was with his detachment in Kiev. He was murdered there on 28 January 1918 by a Red Guardist sailor who shot him in the back of the head, in connection with the first revolutionary and nationalistic waves of fighting in Kiev, where Russian imperial officers were targeted by all.

== See also ==
- Belosselsky-Belozersky family
- Krestovsky Island

== Sources ==
- "Esper Beloselsky Bio, Stats, and Results". Olympic Sports. Sports-Reference.com. Archived from the original on 17 April 2020.
- The Swedish Olympic Committee (1913). Erik Bergvall (ed.). The Olympic Games of Stockholm 1912 – Official Report (PDF). Wahlström & Widstrand. Archived from the original (PDF) on 29 October 2012.
