= Ernst Brasche =

Russian sailor

Personal information
- Full name: Ernst Konrad Otto Brasche
- Nationality: Russian Empire; Estonia
- Born: 27 November 1873 Reval, Russian Empire
- Died: 12 November 1933 (aged 59) Tallinn, Estonia

Sport

Sailing career
- Class: 10 Metre
- Club: in 1912: St. Petersburg River Yacht Club, Санкт-Петербургский речной яхт-клуб
Medal record
sailing
Representing Russia
Olympic Games
Bronze medal – third place	1912 Nynäshamn	10 Metre
- Updated on 5 July 2016

Ernst Konrad Otto Brasche (Russian: Эрнест Браше, transcribed Ernest Braše, 27 November 1873 – 12 November 1933) was an Estonian physician, sport sailor, and chess player who participated as part of the Imperial Russian sailing team at the 1912 Summer Olympics in Nynäshamn, Sweden. Brasche and his team members took a bronze medal in the 10 Metre regatta.

== Biography ==
Ernst Brasche was born in Reval (now, Tallinn) to Baltic German parents Johann Heinrich Brasche, a Lutheran clergyman, and Anna Wilhelmine Hoffmann. In 1893, he graduated from Gustav Adolf Gymnasium and in 1894, enrolled at the Faculty of Medicine of the University of Tartu, graduating in 1899. During the Russo-Japanese War, he was a doctor in the Russian Red Cross Society service in Harbin. After the war, he stayed in Saint Petersburg, where he was a doctor there during the First World War from 1915 until 1918.

In 1918, he came back to Estonia with his family. During the Estonian War of Independence, he was a doctor at the 2nd Tallinn Military Hospital, where he worked after the war until 1925. Afterwards, he worked as a private doctor in the field of ear, nose and throat diseases in Tallinn and Haapsalu. He became Tallinn's first chess champion in 1921. He took 3rd place in the 1st Estonian Championship in 1925.

Brasche died in 1933 in Tallinn, aged 59.

== Sources ==
- "Ernst Brasche Bio, Stats, and Results". Olympic Sports. Sports-Reference.com. Archived from the original on 17 April 2020.
- Swedish Olympic Committee (1913). Erik Bergvall (ed.). The Olympic Games of Stockholm 1912 – Official Report (PDF). Wahlström & Widstrand. Archived from the original (PDF) on 29 October 2012.
