= Erik Waller (sailor) =

Swedish sailor

Erik Waller (March 24, 1887 – September 25, 1958) was a Swedish sailor who competed in the 1912 Summer Olympics. In 1912, he was a crew member of the Swedish boat Marga, which finished fourth in the 10 metre class competition.
