= Nikolay Pushnitsky =

Russian sailor

Personal information
- Full name: Nikolay Pushnitsky
- Nationality: Russian

Sailing career
- Sport: Sailing
- Club: in 1912: St. Petersburg River Yacht Club
- Class: 10 Metre
Medal record
Sailing
Representing Russia
Olympic Games
Bronze medal – third place	1912 Stockholm	10 Metre

Nikolay Pushnitsky (Russian: Николай Пушницкий) was a sailor from Russia, who represented his country at the 1912 Summer Olympics in Nynäshamn, Sweden. Pushnitsky took the bronze in the 10 Metre.

== Sources ==
- "Nikolay Pushnitsky Bio, Stats, and Results". Olympic Sports. Sports-Reference.com. Archived from the original on 17 April 2020.
- Swedish Olympic Committee (1913). Erik Bergvall (ed.). The Olympic Games of Stockholm 1912 – Official Report (PDF). Wahlström & Widstrand. Archived from the original (PDF) on 10 April 2008.
