= Joseph Heinrich von Schomacker =

Russian sailor

Joseph von Schomacker
Personal information
- Full name: Joseph Heinrich von Schomacker
- Nationality: Russian Empire
- Born: 31 May 1859 Dünamünde/Daugavgrīva, Russian Empire
- Died: 17 July 1931 (aged 72) Kötzschenbroda, Germany

Sport

Sailing career
- Class: 10 Metre
- Club: St. Petersburg River Yacht Club
Medal record
Sailing
Representing Russia
Olympic Games
| Bronze medal – third place | 1912 Stockholm | 10 Metre |

Joseph Heinrich von Schomacker (Russian: Иосиф Андреевич Шомакер, romanized: Iosif Andreyevich Shomaker; born 31 May 1859 in Dünamünde/Daugavgrīva near Riga, Russian Empire – 17 July 1931 in Kötzschenbroda, German Empire) was a Baltic German physician, sailor and Olympic medalist. Schomacker at the 1912 Olympic Games with the Russian Empire team Gallia II won a bronze medal in sailing in the 10 Metre class. The owner of the yacht was Aleksandr Vyshnegradsky, the father of the Russian composer Ivan Vyshnegradsky.

== Sources ==
- "Joseph Schomacker Bio, Stats, and Results". Olympic Sports. Sports-Reference.com. Archived from the original on 5 March 2016.
- Swedish Olympic Committee (1913). Erik Bergvall (ed.). The Olympic Games of Stockholm 1912 – Official Report (PDF). Wahlström & Widstrand. Archived from the original (PDF) on 29 October 2012.
