= Sven Thomsen =

Danish sailor

Personal information
- Full name: Sven Bernth Thomsen
- Nationality: Danish
- Born: 7 September 1884 Copenhagen, Denmark
- Died: 14 November 1968 (aged 84) Vittsjö, Hässleholm, Denmark

Sailing career
- Sport: Sailing
- Club: Royal Danish Yacht Club
- Class: 6 Metre
Medal record
Men's sailing
Representing Denmark
Olympic Games
Silver medal – second place	1912 Stockholm	6 metre class

Sven Bernth Thomsen (7 September 1884 – 14 November 1968) was a Danish sailor who competed in the 1912 Summer Olympics. He was part of the Danish boat Nurdug II, which won the silver medal in the 6 metre class.
