= Steen Herschend =

Danish sailor

Personal information
- Full name: Steen Steensen Herschend
- Born: 12 November 1888 Copenhagen, Denmark
- Died: 3 August 1976 (aged 87) Taarbæk, Lyngby-Taarbæk

Sailing career
- Sport: Sailing
- Club: Royal Danish Yacht Club
- Class: 6 Metre
Medal record
Men's sailing
Representing Denmark
Olympic Games
Silver medal – second place	1912 Stockholm	6 Metre class

Steen Steensen Herschend (12 November 1888 – 3 August 1976) was a Danish sailor who competed in the 1912 Summer Olympics. He was part of the Danish boat Nurdug II, which won the silver medal in the 6 metre class.
