= Erik Lindén (sailor) =

Swedish sailor

Erik Erland Lindén (July 28, 1880 – September 16, 1952) was a Swedish sailor who competed in the 1912 Summer Olympics. In 1912, he was a crew member of the Swedish boat Marga, which finished fourth in the 10 metre class competition.
