= Wilhelm Forsberg =

Swedish sailor

Fred Wilhelm Forsberg (March 12, 1862 – December 25, 1939) was a Swedish sailor who competed in the 1912 Summer Olympics. In 1912, he was a crew member of the Swedish boat Marga, which finished fourth in the 10 metre class competition.
