= Sailing at the 2028 Summer Olympics =

Sailing at the Games of the XXXIV Olympiad
- Venue: Belmont Shore (board); Long Beach, California; Port of Los Angeles (boat); Los Angeles, California
- Dates: July 16–28, 2028
- No. of events: 10 (4 men, 4 women, 2 mixed)

Sailing competitions at the 2028 Summer Olympics will be held in July at the Port of Los Angeles in San Pedro. The number of sailors competing across ten different events at these Games remains at 330, the same as the 2024 Olympics, with an equal distribution between men and women.

== Events and equipment ==
Class	Type	Event	Gender	Sailors	Trapeze	Mainsail	Jib/Genoa	Spinnaker	Classes Intro.	Event Intro.
IQFoil	Windfoiling	Fleet	Female	1	–	+	–	–	2024	
IQFoil	Windfoiling	Fleet	Male	1	–	+	–	–	2024	
Formula Kite	Kiteboard	Fleet	Female	1	–	+	–	–	2024	
Formula Kite	Kiteboard	Fleet	Male	1	–	+	–	–	2024	
ILCA 6	Dinghy	Fleet	Female	1	–	+	–	–	2008	
ILCA 7	Dinghy	Fleet	Male	1	–	+	–	–	1996	Various
470	Dinghy	Fleet	Mixed	2	1	+	+	+	1976	2024
49er	Skiff	Fleet	Male	2	2	+	+	+	2000	Various
49erFX	Skiff	Fleet	Female	2	2	+	+	+	2016	
Nacra 17	Multihull	Fleet	Mixed	2	2	+	+	+	2016	

== Venue ==
Initially, all events were to be held at Belmont Shore, the venue for the 1984 competition. As a result of advocacy from councilman Tim McOsker, who represented the area including the Port of Los Angeles, it was announced that the boat events would be held at the port, with the board events remaining at Belmont Shore.

== Overview ==
=== Qualification ===
Sailing allows only one boat per event with the host country, America automatically qualifying. All other places are won by the respective countries based on results at World Championships and continental events. Within sailing the country and not the sailor qualifies to compete at the Olympics it is up to the National Olympic Committee to decide which sailor get awarded the place.

== Participating NOCs ==
In total, XYZ NOCs except Individual Neutral Athletes (AIN), participated at the sport of sailing.

- United States (0) host

== Competition schedule ==
=== Medal table ===
* Host nation (United States)

Rank	NOC	Gold	Silver	Bronze	Total
1	United States	0	0	0	0
Totals (1 entries)		0	0	0	0

=== Men's events ===
Event	Gold	Silver	Bronze
iQFoil			
Formula Kite			
Laser			
49er			

=== Women's events ===
Event	Gold	Silver	Bronze
iQFoil			
Formula Kite			
Laser radial			
49erFX			

=== Mixed events ===
Event	Gold	Silver	Bronze
470			
Nacra 17			

== See also ==
- Sailing at the Summer Olympics
