= Harry Wahl =

Finnish sailor

Medal record

Men's Sailing

Representing Finland

Olympic Games
Silver medal – second place	1912 Stockholm	10 metre class

Harry August Wahl (17 July 1869 – 31 July 1940) was a Finnish businessman, violin collector, and sailor who competed in the 1912 Summer Olympics. He was a crew member of the Finnish boat Nina, which won the silver medal in the 10 metre class.

Harry Wahl was the grandson of Vyborg-based industrialist Paul von Wahl (1797–1872). The Wahl family had made its fortune by various businesses, many of which were connected to the construction of the Saimaa Canal around the 1850s.

== Collector of string instruments ==
In the 1930s, Harry Wahl owned one of the most significant collections of violins and other string instruments in Europe, including several made by Antonio Stradivari (seven violins), Guarneri (six violins) and Amati (five violins). When the Russians bombed Vyborg in 1940, violinist Onni Suhonen was worried about the violin collection which was stored in Wahl's empty Vyborg home.

Only two outsiders, Onni Suhonen and Yrjö Suomalainen, both well known Finnish violinists, had keys and access to Harry Wahl's home safe in Vyborg. Mr Suhonen knew thoroughly Wahl's instrument collection being a frequent visitor to Wahl's home where Suhonen used to play the valuable violins.

As the Russian army was heavily bombing Vyborg, Onni Suhonen managed to get a vehicle from the Finnish army to which he loaded violins to be transported to safety from the war zone. Thus the Wahl family secured altogether 32 of the best instruments in their possession while the rest were left with the Russians.

Mr Suhonen was given one or two violins from the collection as a reward for the rather dangerous rescue operation. It was publicly known he had one Amati. But some people close to him claim Mr Suhonen also had a precious early 17th century Guarneri (built 1619, according to one violin student of Mr Suhonen). This may well be true as financial wealth was heavily taxed in Finland during post war years.

After World War II Onni Suhonen told his students in Helsinki that he had to leave behind him between 40 and 60 instruments in Wahl's house because the car he used for evacuation of the instruments was only a normal less spacious sedan.

He said he took with him well over twenty violins and four cellos. Mr Suhonen later became professor at the Sibelius Academy in Helsinki.

Harry Wahl died the same year 1940, and most of his wealth, real estate in the Vyborg area, had to be left behind as his family evacuated to Finland. There, they had to sell the instruments at low prices to start new lives, and the collection was spread around the world. One of the violins, a 1702 Stradivarius called the Irish, was auctioned in Japan in 1986 and purchased by the Finnish Pohjola Bank Art Foundation, and is now the only violin in Harry Wahl’s original collection located in Finland.
