= Humbert Lundén =

Swedish sailor

Olympic medal record

Men's Sailing
Gold medal – first place	1912 Stockholm	10 metre class

Humbert Lundén (January 7, 1882 – February 5, 1961) was a Swedish sailor who competed in the 1912 Summer Olympics. He was a crew member of the Swedish boat Kitty, which won the gold medal in the ten metre class.
