= Allan Franck =

Finnish sailor

Olympic medal record

Men's Sailing
Silver medal – second place	1912 Stockholm	10 metre class

Allan Gunthard Franck (September 17, 1888 – May 28, 1963) was a Finnish sailor who competed in the 1912 Summer Olympics. He was a crew member of the Finnish boat Nina, which won the silver medal in the 10 metre class.
