= Harald Wallin =

Swedish sailor

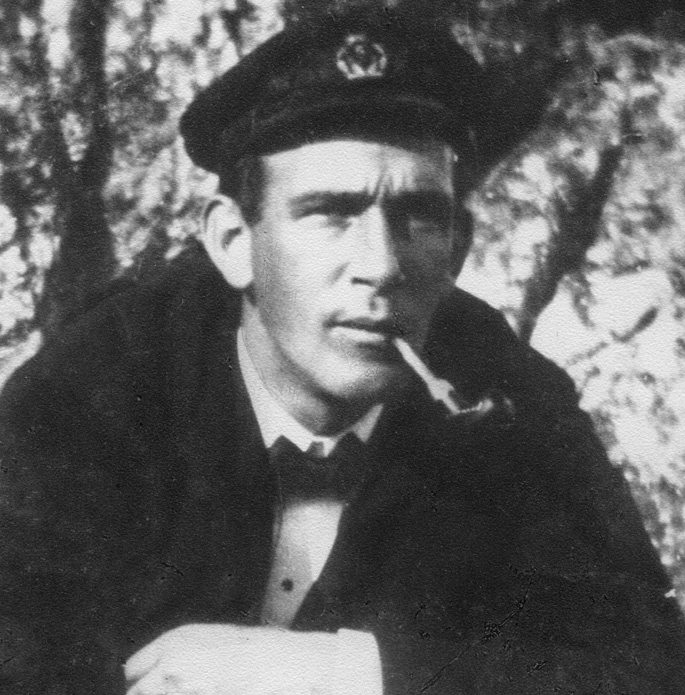

Personal information
- Born: 27 February 1887 Gothenburg, Sweden
- Died: 16 June 1946 (aged 59) Gothenburg, Sweden

Sailing career
- Sport: Sailing
- Club: Royal Gothenburg Yacht Club
Medal record
Sailing
Representing Sweden
Olympic Games
Gold medal – first place	1912 Stockholm	10 Metre
Silver medal – second place	1908 London	8 Metre

Johan Harald Alfred Wallin (27 February 1887 – 16 June 1946) was a Swedish sailor who competed at the 1908 and 1912 Summer Olympics.

In 1908, he was a crew member of the Swedish boat Vinga, which won the silver medal in the 8 metre class. Four years later, he was a crew member of the Swedish boat Kitty which won the gold medal in the 10 metre class.
