= Filip Ericsson =

Swedish sailor

Olympic medal record

Men's Sailing
Gold medal – first place	1912 Stockholm	10 metre class

Filip Ericsson (May 25, 1882, Gothenburg – December 25, 1951) was a Swedish sailor who competed in the 1912 Summer Olympics. He was a crew member of the Swedish boat Kitty, which won the gold medal in the 10 metre class.
