= Herman Nyberg =

Swedish sailor

Olympic medal record

Men's Sailing
Gold medal – first place	1912 Stockholm	10 metre class

Herman Nyberg (February 22, 1880 – July 6, 1968) was a Swedish sailor who competed in the 1912 Summer Olympics. He was a crew member of the Swedish boat Kitty, which won the gold medal in the 10 metre class.
