= Juho Aarne Pekkalainen =

Finnish sailor

Olympic medal record

Men's Sailing
Silver medal – second place	1912 Stockholm	10 metre class

Johan Anders "Juho Aarne" Pekkalainen (1895 – March 19, 1958) was a Finnish sailor who competed in the 1912 Summer Olympics. He was a crew member of the Finnish boat Nina, which won the silver medal in the 10 metre class.
