= Bror Brenner =

Finnish sailor

Olympic medal record

Men's Sailing
Silver medal – second place	1912 Stockholm	10 metre class

Bror Benediktus Bernhard Brenner (July 17, 1855 – April 17, 1923) was a Finnish sailor who competed in the 1912 Summer Olympics. He was a crew member of the Finnish boat Nina, which won the silver medal in the 10 metre class.
