= Paul Isberg =

Swedish sailor

Olympic medal record

Men's Sailing
Gold medal – first place	1912 Stockholm	10 metre class

Paul Isberg (September 2, 1882 in Helsingborg, Scania – March 5, 1955) was a Swedish sailor who competed in the 1912 Summer Olympics. He was a crew member of the Swedish boat Kitty, which won the gold medal in the 10 metre class and was the first Swedish boat and crew to win in sailing at the Olympics.

His daughter Kerstin Isberg was a Swedish swimmer.
