= Waldemar Björkstén =

Finnish sailor (1873–1933)

Olympic medal record

Men's Sailing
Silver medal – second place	1912 Stockholm	10 metre class

Waldemar Björkstén (August 12, 1873 – May 31, 1933) was a Finnish sailor who competed in the 1912 Summer Olympics. He was a crew member of the Finnish boat Nina, which won the silver medal in the 10 metre class.
