= Erik Wallerius =

Swedish sailor

Medal record

Sailing

Representing Sweden

Olympic Games
Silver medal – second place	1908 London	8 Metre
Gold medal – first place	1912 Stockholm	10 Metre

Erik G. Wallerius (16 April 1878 – 7 May 1967) was a Swedish sailor who competed in the 1908 Summer Olympics and in the 1912 Summer Olympics. In 1908, he won a silver medal as a crew member of the Swedish Vinga in the eight metre class. Four years later, he was part of the Swedish boat Kitty, which won the gold medal in the ten metre class.
