= Jacob Björnström =

Finnish sailor (1881–1935)

- Born: Jacob Carl Gustaf Herman Björnström; December 14, 1881; Uuras, Grand Duchy of Finland
- Died: July 17, 1935 (aged 53); Inari, Finland

Medal record

Sailing

Representing Finland

Olympic Games
Silver medal – second place	1912 Stockholm	10 metre class

Jacob Carl Gustaf Herman Björnström (December 14, 1881 – July 17, 1935) was a Finnish diplomat, businessman and sailor who competed in the 1912 Summer Olympics. He was a crew member of the Finnish boat Nina, which won the silver medal in the 10 metre class.

== Early life ==
Björnström was born in Uuras, near Vyborg, in the Grand Duchy of Finland to Gustaf Herman Björnström and Olga Maria Swahn.

== Death ==
In 1935, Björnström was killed in an automobile accident on the Petsamo highway near Inari, Finland, that also severely injured Kristian Hanssen, the vice consul of Norway in Helsinki.
