= Erik Lindh (sailor) =

Finnish sailor

Olympic medal record

Men's Sailing
Silver medal – second place	1912 Stockholm	10 metre class

Erik Aleksander Lindh (1 May 1865 – 1 December 1914) was a sailor who competed in the 1912 Summer Olympics. He was a crew member of the Finnish boat Nina, which won the silver medal in the 10 metre class.
