= Harry Rosenswärd =

Swedish sailor

Medal record

Sailing

Representing Sweden

Olympic Games
| Gold medal – first place | 1912 Stockholm | 10 metre class |

Harry Rosenswärd (20 April 1882 – 16 July 1955) was a Swedish sailor who competed in the 1912 Summer Olympics. He was a crew member of the Swedish boat Kitty, which won the gold medal in the 10 metre class.
