= Carl Hellström =

Swedish sailor (1864–1962)

Medal record

Sailing

Representing Sweden

Olympic Games
Silver medal – second place	1908 London	8 Metre
Gold medal – first place	1912 Stockholm	8 Metre

Carl Leopold Hellström (10 December 1864, Gothenburg – 4 July 1962) was a Swedish sailor who competed in the 1908 Summer Olympics and in the 1912 Summer Olympics. In 1908, he won a silver medal as a crew member of the Swedish Vinga in the 8 metre class. Four years later, he was part of the Swedish boat Kitty, which won the gold medal in the 10 metre class.
