= Erik Bergvall =

Swedish water polo player

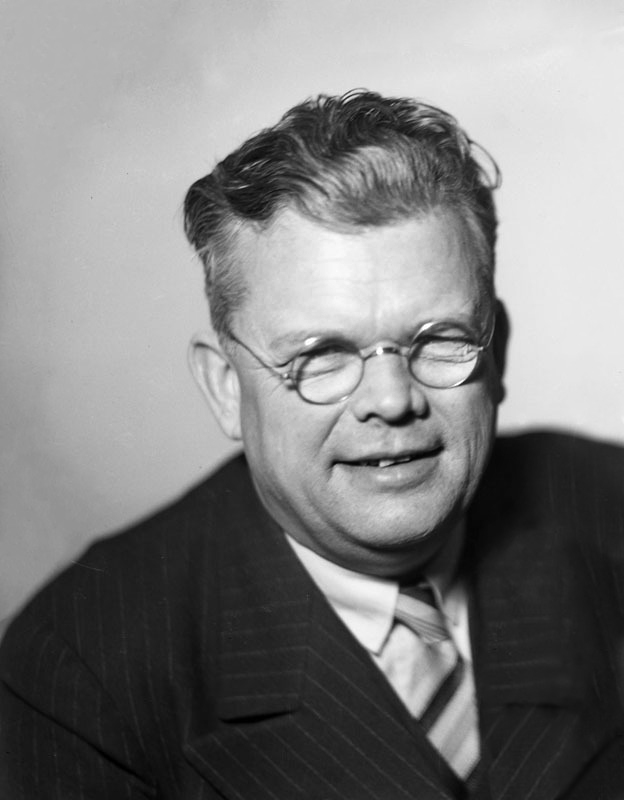

Personal information
- Born: 7 April 1880 Västerfärnebo, Sweden
- Died: 4 February 1950 (aged 69) Stockholm, Sweden

Sport
- Sport: Water polo
Medal record
Representing Sweden
Olympic Games
Bronze medal – third place	1908 London	Team competition

Erik Gustaf Bergvall (7 April 1880 – 4 February 1950) was a Swedish water polo player, journalist and sports official. He also promoted the Bergvall system, a variation of the traditional knockout tournament system which was used at the 1912, 1920 and 1924 Summer Olympics.

== Water polo player ==
As a water polo player, Bergvall represented Sweden at the 1908 Summer Olympics and helped the national water polo team win the bronze medal. At club level, Bergvall represented Stockholms KK.

== Sports official ==
In 1904, Bergvall was among the founding members of the Swedish Swimming Federation and served as its secretary between 1904 and 1908 and as chairman between 1909 and 1932. He was also a member of the board of the Swedish Sports Confederation from its foundation in 1903 until 1945. He also served as assistant secretary of the Swedish Olympic Committee in 1906, and again between 1913 and 1924. In addition, he was among the founders of the Fédération Internationale de Natation in 1908, and was a member of its board until 1928. Between 1924 and 1928, he also served as FINA president. From 1916 to 1946, Bergvall also served as Director for the Stockholm Olympic Stadium.

== Journalist ==
As a journalist Bergvall worked mainly at the sportspaper Nordiskt Idrottslif, published between 1900 and 1920. He had two spells working for this newspaper: 1900-1903 and 1905-1920. He was also the chief editor and compiler of the official report of the 1912 Summer Olympics and wrote and/or edited or was a main contributor to some 30 books, including reports on the Olympic Games between 1920 and 1948 for the Swedish Olympic Committee.

== See also ==
- List of Olympic medalists in water polo (men)
