= St. Petersburg River Yacht Club =

Coordinates: 59°57′51″N 30°14′29″E

St. Petersburg River Yacht Club (PRYC)
- St. Petersburg River Yacht Club Burgee
- Nickname: Central River Yacht Club
- Formation: 1860
- Legal status: active
- Purpose: advocate and public voice, educator and network for Recreational boating, and competitive sailors, coaches, volunteers and events
- Location(s): Petrovsky Island, Saint Petersburg Waterfront Malaya Neva
- Official language: English, Russian
- Website: Skipper: Central River YC (St Petersburg)

The St. Petersburg River Yacht Club, also known as St. Petersburg Central River Yacht Club or simply Central River Yacht Club, is a sailing club in Saint Petersburg. It is located on Petrovsky Island, off Peter's Passage, between the mouths of Malaya Neva and Malaya Nevka rivers. The Naval Yacht Club is close by.

== History ==
The St. Petersburg River Yacht Club was established in 1860 and is one of the oldest Yacht clubs in Russia. It was bestowed royal patronage by the tsar in 1910 on its 50th anniversary.

During the period prior to the revolution of 1917 the Saint Petersburg Yacht Club was a social centre for officers of the Russian Imperial Guard. It was described as "the great centre where careers and reputations were made and broken".

During the Soviet era the club went through a difficult period. It was renamed a few times; one of the club's names being "Central Yacht Club Trud". As part of the 1980 Olympics preparations program, the club was revived, so that the Soviet Union would have a competing Olympic sailing fleet.
