= Sailing at the 1936 Summer Olympics – 6 Metre =

6 Metre at the Games of the XI Olympiad
- Venue: Firth of Kiel
- Dates: 4–12 August
- Competitors: 60 from 12 nations
- Teams: 12

Medalists
1st place, gold medalist(s)		Christopher Boardman; Miles Bellville; Russell Harmer; Charles Leaf; Leonard Martin	Great Britain
2nd place, silver medalist(s)		Magnus Konow; Karsten Konow; Fredrik Meyer; Vaadjuv Nyqvist; Alf Tveten	Norway
3rd place, bronze medalist(s)		Sven Salén; Lennart Ekdahl; Martin Hindorff; Torsten Lord; Dagmar Salén	Sweden

The 6 Metre was a sailing event on the Sailing at the 1936 Summer Olympics program in Firth of Kiel. A thrilling series of seven races was on the agenda, featuring a diverse fleet of 12 boats. A total of 60 skilled sailors from 12 different nations came together, each eager to showcase their prowess on the water.

== Results ==
Rank	Helmsman (Country)	Crew	Yachtname	Sailnumber (Note: Sailnumbers are listed to make it possible to identify the specific sailors on the pictures.)	Race I		Race II		Race III		Race IV		Race V		Race VI		Race VII		Total Points (Note: The 1936 Olympic scoring system was used.)
Rank	Helmsman (Country)	Crew	Yachtname	Sailnumber	Rank	Points	Rank	Points	Rank	Points	Rank	Points	Rank	Points	Rank	Points	Rank	Points	Total Points
1st place, gold medalist(s)	Christopher Boardman (GBR)	Miles Bellville; Russell Harmer; Charles Leaf; Leonard Martin	Lalage	K 51	3	10	2	11	5	8	4	9	2	11	6	7	2	11	67
2nd place, silver medalist(s)	Magnus Konow (NOR)	Karsten Konow; Fredrik Meyer; Vaadjuv Nyqvist; Alf Tveten	Lully	N 61 II	DSQ	0	1	12	4	9	2	11	3	10	1	12	1	12	66
3rd place, bronze medalist(s)	Sven Salén (SWE)	Lennart Ekdahl; Martin Hindorff; Torsten Lord; Dagmar Salén	May Be	S 2	1	12	3	10	DNF	0	3	10	1	12	2	11	6	7	62
4	Julio Sieburger (ARG)	Claudio Bincaz; Germán Frers; Edelf Hosmann; Jorge Linck	Wiking	A 11	5	8	8	5	2	11	8	5	4	9	5	8	7	6	52
5	Renato Consentino (ITA)	Giuliano Oberti; Massimo Oberti; Giovanni Stampa; Giuseppe Volpi	Esperia	I 52	7	6	5	8	1	12	9	4	6	7	10	3	3	10	50
6	Hans Lubinus (GER)	Dietrich Christensen; Kurt Frey; Theodor Thomsen; Haimar Wedemeyer	Gustel V	G 25	2	11	4	9	DSQ	0	1	12	DSQ	0	4	9	5	8	49
7	Curt Mattson (FIN)	Yngve Pacius; Ragnar Stenbäck; Holger Sumelius; Lars Winqvist	Lyn	L 17	4	9	6	7	3	10	7	6	DSQ	0	7	6	8	5	43
8	Joop Carp (NED)	Ansco Dokkum; Kees Jonker; Herman Looman; Ernst Moltzer	De Ruyter	H 14	8	5	9	4	DNF	0	5	8	7	6	3	10	4	9	42
9	William Bartholomae Jr. (USA)	Morgan Adams; Charles Garner; Carl Paul; John Wallace	Mystery	US 57	6	7	10	3	6	7	6	7	5	8	8	5	DNF	0	37
10	Jean Peytel (FRA)	Yves Baudrier; Claude Desouches; Gérard de Piolenc; Jacques Rambaud	Qu’Importe	F50	9	4	7	6	7	6	10	3	8	5	11	2	9	4	30
11	Janusz Zalewski (POL)	Alfons Olszewski; Juliusz Sieradzki; Stanislaw Zalewski; Józef Szajba	Danuta	PZ 1	10	3	11	2	DNF	0	11	2	9	4	9	4	10	3	18
12	André Firmenich (SUI)	Frédéric Firmenich; Georges Firmenich; Alexandre Gelbert; Alexandre Noverraz	Ylliam III	Z 21	DSQ	0	DSQ	0	DSQ	0	DSQ	0	DSQ	0	DSQ	0	DSQ	0	0

DNF = Did not finish, DNS= Did not start, DSQ = Disqualified, SO = Sailed over
= Male, = Female

=== Daily standings ===
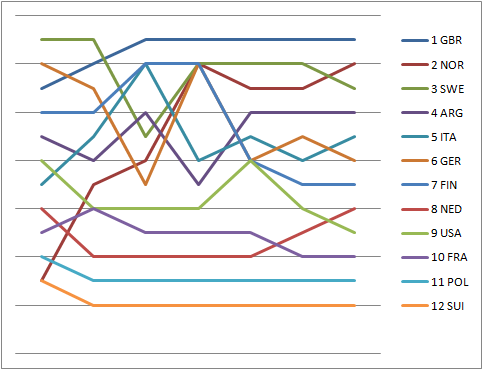
Graph showing the daily standings in the 6 Metre during the 1936 Summer Olympics

== Conditions at the Outer Course ==
All starts were scheduled for 10:30.
The position of the outercourse was in front of Schilksee were in 1972 the new Olympic center was used. So in 1936 a long-distance sailing/towing to the racing area from the old Olympic harbor.

Date	Race	Sky	Wind direction	Wind speed (m/s)	Actual starting time	Remark
4 August 1936	I	Overcast, Occasional rain	SW	12	12:05	Postponement storm at the outer bay > 16 m/s
5 August 1936	II	Sunshine, Later overcast and rain	WSW	3-4	10:30	
6 August 1936	III	Sunny	WSW	5-6	10:30	
7 August 1936	IV	Slightly overcast	NE	2	10:40	Postponement due to calm
8 August 1936	V	Foggy later slightly overcast	NE	2-3	11:45	Postponement due to fog
9 August 1936	VI	Calm	ENE	2-3	11:50	Postponement due to calm
10 August 1936	VII	Fine	SE	2-3	10:30	
