= Sailing at the 1936 Summer Olympics – 8 Metre =

Sailing at the Olympics

8 Metre at the Games of the XI Olympiad
- Venue: Firth of Kiel
- Dates: 4–12 August
- Competitors: 60 from 10 nations
- Teams: 10

Medalists
| 1st place, gold medalist(s) | | Giovanni Reggio; Bruno Bianchi; Luigi De Manincor; Domenico Mordini; Enrico Poggi; Luigi Poggi | Italy |
| 2nd place, silver medalist(s) | | Olaf Ditlev-Simonsen; Hans Struksnæs; Lauritz Schmidt; Nordahl Wallem; Jacob Tullin Thams; John Ditlev-Simonsen | Norway |
| 3rd place, bronze medalist(s) | | Hans Howaldt; Fritz Bischoff; Alfried Krupp von Bohlen und Halbach; Eduard Mohr; Felix Scheder-Bieschin; Otto Wachs | Germany |

The 8 Metre was a sailing event on the Sailing at the 1936 Summer Olympics program in Firth of Kiel. Seven races were scheduled. 60 sailors, on 10 boats, from 10 nations competed.

== Results ==
| Rank | Helmsman (Country) | Crew | Yachtname | Sail no. (Note: Sailnumbers are listed to make it possible to identify the specific sailors on the pictures.) | Race I | | Race II | | Race III | | Race IV | | Race V | | Race VI | | Race VII | | Tie breaker | Total points (Note: The 1936 Olympic scoring system was used.) |
| Rank | Helmsman (Country) | Crew | Yachtname | Sail no. | Rank | Pts | Rank | Pts | Rank | Pts | Rank | Pts | Rank | Pts | Rank | Pts | Rank | Pts | Tie breaker | Total points |
|---|---|---|---|---|---|---|---|---|---|---|---|---|---|---|---|---|---|---|---|---|
| 1st place, gold medalist(s) | Giovanni Reggio (ITA) | Bruno Bianchi; Luigi De Manincor; Domenico Mordini; Enrico Poggi; Luigi Poggi | Italia | I 20 | 2 | 9 | 5 | 6 | 6 | 5 | 1 | 10 | 3 | 8 | 3 | 8 | 2 | 9 | | 55 |
| 2nd place, silver medalist(s) | Olaf Ditlev-Simonsen (NOR) | John Ditlev-Simonsen; Lauritz Schmidt; Hans Struksnæs; Jacob Tullin Thams; Nordahl Wallem | Silja | N 26 | 3 | 8 | 1 | 10 | 2 | 9 | 6 | 5 | 5 | 6 | 4 | 7 | 3 | 8 | 1 | 53 |
| 3rd place, bronze medalist(s) | Hans Howaldt (GER) | Fritz Bischoff; Alfried Krupp von Bohlen und Halbach; Eduard Mohr; Felix Scheder-Bieschin; Otto Wachs | Germania III | G 9 | 6 | 5 | 2 | 9 | 4 | 7 | 4 | 7 | 1 | 10 | 1 | 10 | 6 | 5 | 2 | 53 |
| 4 | Tore Holm (SWE) | Marcus Wallenberg; Wilhelm Moberg; Detlov von Braun; Per Gedda; Bo Westerberg | Ilderim | S 16 | 1 | 10 | 3 | 8 | 1 | 10 | 3 | 8 | 6 | 5 | DSQ | 0 | 1 | 10 | | 51 |
| 5 | Gunnar Grönblom (FIN) | Hilding Silander; Oscar Sumelius; Olof Wallin; Sven Grönblom; Walter Kjellberg | Cheerio | L 7 | 5 | 6 | 6 | 5 | 3 | 8 | 7 | 4 | 4 | 7 | DSQ | 0 | 4 | 7 | | 37 |
| 6 | Kenneth Preston (GBR) | Robert Steele; Joseph Compton; John Eddy; Beryl Preston; Francis Preston | Saskia | K 26 | 4 | 7 | 4 | 7 | 5 | 6 | 5 | 6 | 9 | 2 | 5 | 6 | 9 | 2 | | 36 |
| 7 | Rufino Rodríguez de la Torre (ARG) | Mario Ortíz; Luis Domingo Aguirre; Hipólito Gil; Rafael Ernesto Iglesias; Guillermo Peralta | Matrero II | A 5 | 8 | 3 | 7 | 4 | 7 | 4 | 9 | 2 | 8 | 3 | 6 | 5 | 7 | 4 | | 25 |
| 8 | Niels Wal Hansen (DEN) | Hans Tholstrup; Otto Gunnar Danielsen; Carl Berntsen; Vagn Kastrup; Niels Schibbye | Anitra | D 1 | 9 | 2 | 10 | 1 | 10 | 1 | 2 | 9 | 2 | 9 | DSQ | 0 | DNF | 0 | | 22 |
| 9 | Pierre Arbaut (FRA) | Pierre Gaudermen; Rémi Schelcher; Charles Gaulthier; Henri Bachet; Ernest Granier | EA II | F 8 | 10 | 1 | 9 | 2 | 9 | 2 | DSQ | 0 | 7 | 4 | 2 | 9 | 8 | 3 | | 21 |
| 10 | Owen Churchill (USA) | Robert Sutton; Carl Dorsey; William Keane; Frederick Shick; Antonia Churchill | Angelita | US 18 | 7 | 4 | 8 | 3 | 8 | 3 | 8 | 3 | 10 | 1 | dsq | 0 | 5 | 6 | | 20 |

DNF = Did Not Finish, DNS= Did Not Start, DSQ = Disqualified, SO = Sailed over
= Male, = Female

=== Daily standings ===
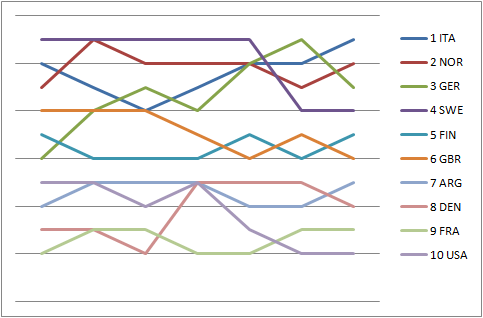
Graph showing the daily standings in the 8 Metre during the 1936 Summer Olympics

== Conditions at the Outer Course ==
All starts were scheduled for 10:30.
The position of the outercourse was in front of Schilksee were in 1972 the new Olympic center was used. So in 1936 a long distance sailing/towing to the racing area from the old Olympic harbor.

Inner Course area at Kiel

| Date | Race | Sky | Wind direction | Wind speed (m/s) | Actual starting time | Remark |
|---|---|---|---|---|---|---|
| 4 August 1936 | I | Overcast, Occasional rain | SW | 12 | 12:05 | Postponement storm at the outer bay > 16 m/s |
| 5 August 1936 | II | Sunshine, Later overcast and rain | WSW | 3–4 | 10:30 | |
| 6 August 1936 | III | Sunny | WSW | 5–6 | 10:30 | |
| 7 August 1936 | IV | Slightly overcast | NE | 2 | 10:40 | Postponement due to calm |
| 8 August 1936 | V | Foggy later slightly overcast | NE | 2–3 | 11:45 | Postponement due to fog |
| 9 August 1936 | VI | Calm | ENE | 2–3 | 11:50 | Postponement due to calm |
| 10 August 1936 | VII | Fine | SE | 2–3 | 10:30 | |
| 12 August 1936 | VII | Slightly overcast | E | 4–5 | 14:05 | |
