= Firmenich (surname) =

Firmenich is a surname of German origin.

== People with the surname ==
- André Firmenich (1905–1965), Swiss sailor
- Eduard Firmenich-Richartz (1864–1923), German art historian
- Frédéric Firmenich (1874–1953), Swiss sailor
- Georges Firmenich (born 1913), Swiss sailor
- Joseph Firmenich (1821–1891) was a German painter
- Mario Firmenich (born 1948), Argentine urban guerrilla leader and politician
- Ruth Firmenich (born 1964), German politician

== See also ==
- Firmenich, Swiss chemical company
- Team DSM–Firmenich PostNL (disambiguation)
