= Giovanni Stampa =

Italian sailor

Personal information
- Nationality: Italian
- Born: 18 February 1913; Naples, Kingdom of Italy

Giovanni Stampa (born 18 February 1913, date of death unknown) was an Italian sailor. He competed at the 1936 Summer Olympics.

== Career ==
=== 1936 Summer Olympics ===
Stampa participated at the sailing mixed 6 metres. He entered the event as a crew member for Team Italy alongside other crew members: Giuliano Oberti, Massimo Oberti, Giuseppe Volpi. The helmsman was Renato Cosentino. The yacht name was Esperia and the sailnumber was I 52.

Team Italy's final ranking was 5th place.

Race I		Race II		Race III		Race IV		Race V		Race VI		Race VII		Total Points	Final Rank
Rank	Points	Rank	Points	Rank	Points	Rank	Points	Rank	Points	Rank	Points	Rank	Points	Total Points	Final Rank
7	6	5	8	1	12	9	4	6	7	10	3	3	10	50	5th
