= Sailing at the 1936 Summer Olympics =

Sailing at the Games of the XI Olympiad
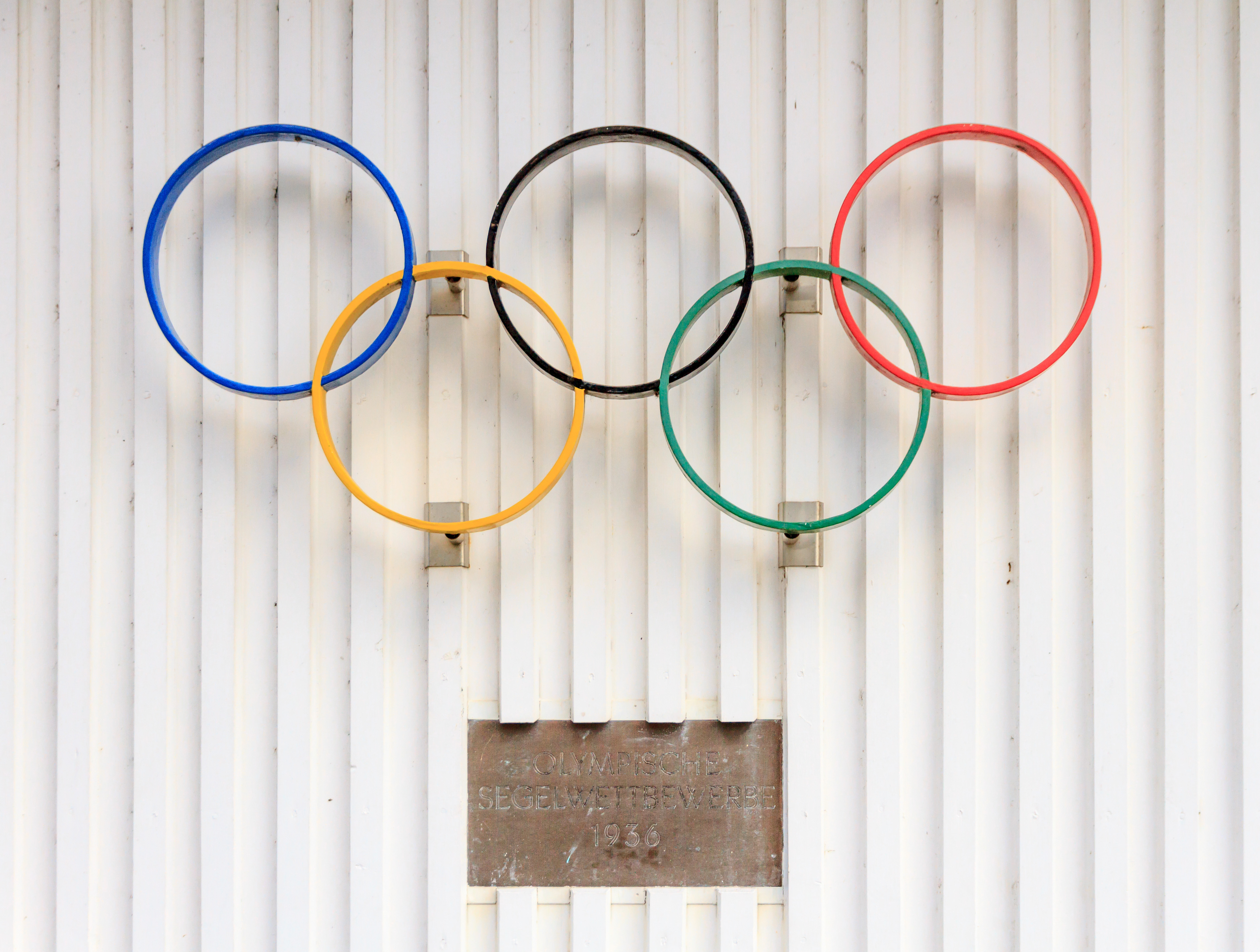
- Plaque: Olympische Segel Wettbewerbe 1936 (Olympic Sailing Competition 1936)
- Venues: Firth of Kiel
- Dates: First race: 4 August 1936; Last race: 12 August 1936
- Competitors: 166 Male and 3 Female from 26 nations
- Boats: 59

Sailing/Yachting is an Olympic sport starting from the Games of the 1st Olympiad (1896 Olympics in Athens, Greece). With the exception of 1904 and the canceled 1916 Summer Olympics, sailing has always been included on the Olympic schedule. The Sailing program of 1936 consisted of a total of four sailing classes (disciplines). For each class seven races were scheduled from 29 August 1936 to 8 September 1936 at the Firth of Kiel.

== Venue ==
For the 1936 Berlin Summer Olympics a choice had to be made between the Berliner Müggel Lake district or the Kiel area. Finally the Organizing committee made the decision in favour of the big boats and picked Kiel. As a result of the distance between Berlin to Kiel, a special committee for Yachting sprung to life to assist the Organizing Committee for the XIth Olympiad. Since Kiel was mainly a military port this committee had to cooperate not only with the local authorities but also with the German Fleet Command in Kiel to ensure the success of the races.

Olympic Harbor
- Burgee of the Kieler Yacht Club

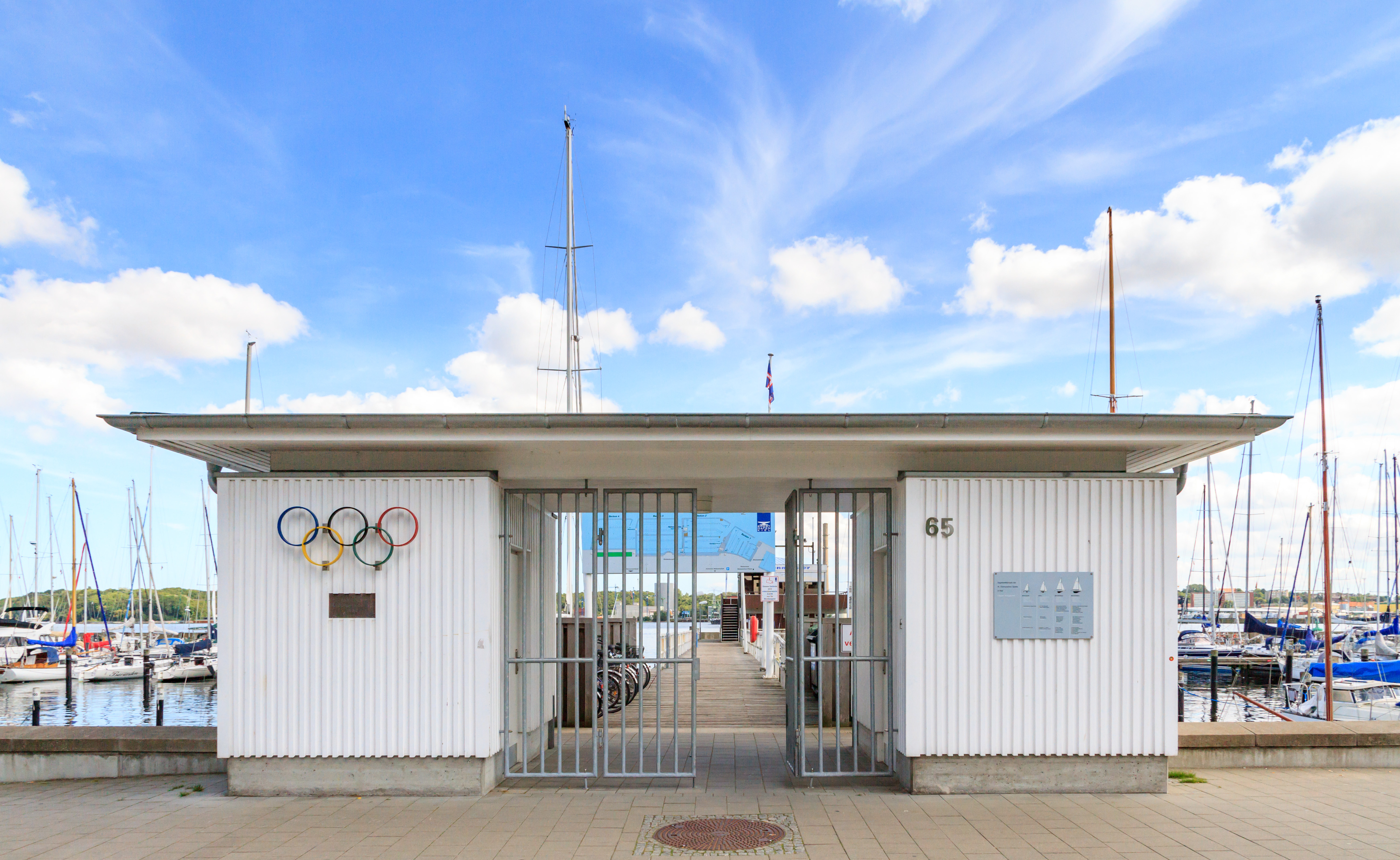
- Interactive map of the Olympic Harbor area

General information
- Status: Completed
- Type: Olympic harbor
- Location: Germany
- Coordinates: 54°20′16″N 10°09′26″E
- Elevation: Sealevel

=== Course areas and courses ===
One race area was created to the East of Schilksee and two in the harbor area more into the Firth of Kiel. Near the course areas tribunes on barges and on land were placed for spectators.

1936 Olympic Course Areas

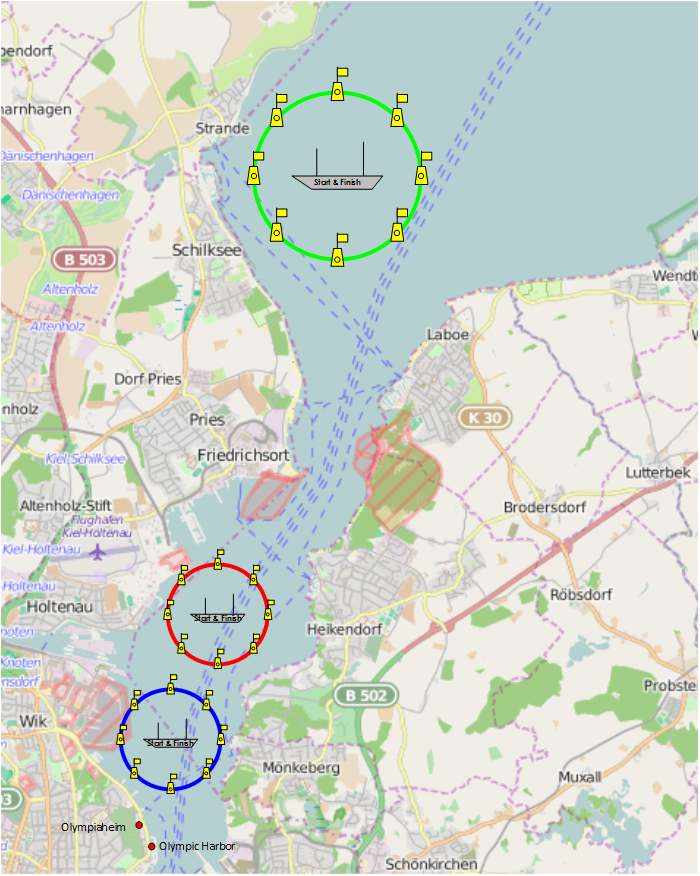
OpenStreetMap view of the current map of Firth of Kiel. Projected are the 1936 Olympic sailing courses.

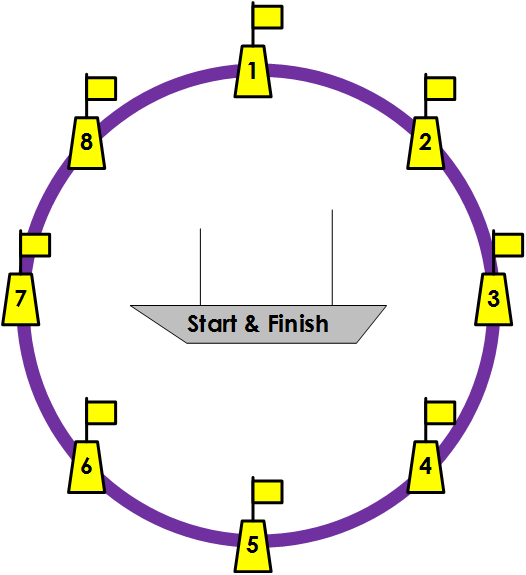
To define the actual course the race committee gave the sequence in which the marks should be rounded.

e.g: Start - 1 port - 7 port - 5 port - 1 port - 5 port - Finish.

The sailing was done on the triangular type Olympic courses. The start was made in the center of a set of 8 numbered marks that were places in a circle. This made it possible to begin and finish every race sailing against the wind, regardless of the direction of the wind. During the starting procedure the sequence of the marks was communicated to the sailors. Starting upwind ensure a fair start of every race. This mark system is, at least in certain German lakes, still in use in many places.

The German Navy, was besides the organization of the race management responsible, with the help of the shipping lines, for keeping the race areas free of undesirable traffic.

== Competition ==
=== Overview ===
Continents	Countries	Classes	Boats	Male	Female
4	26	4	59	166	3

=== Continents ===
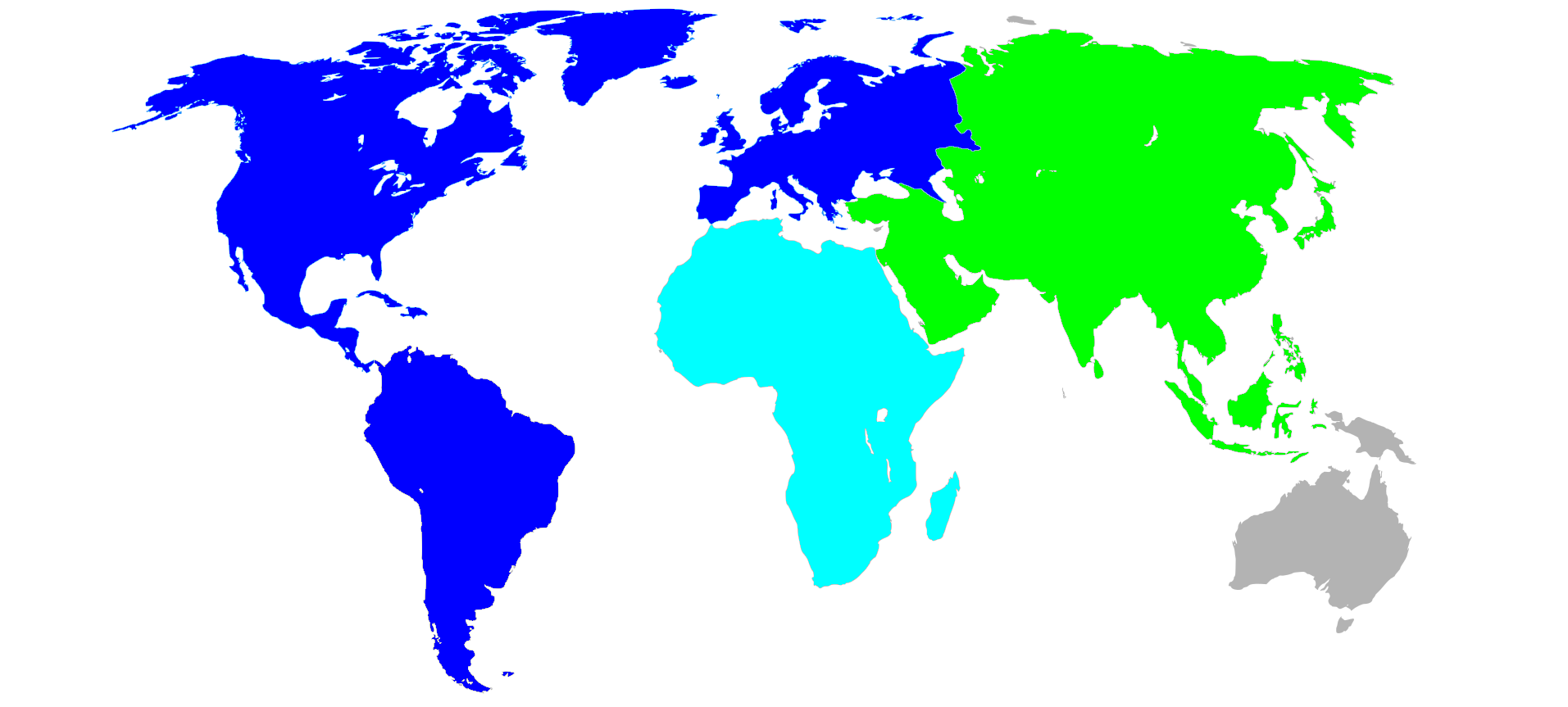
Map of Participating Sailing Continents at the 1936 Summer Olympics ● Green = Participating for the first time ● Blue = Participating ● Light Blue = Have previously participated

● Asia
● Europe
● North America
● South America

=== Countries ===
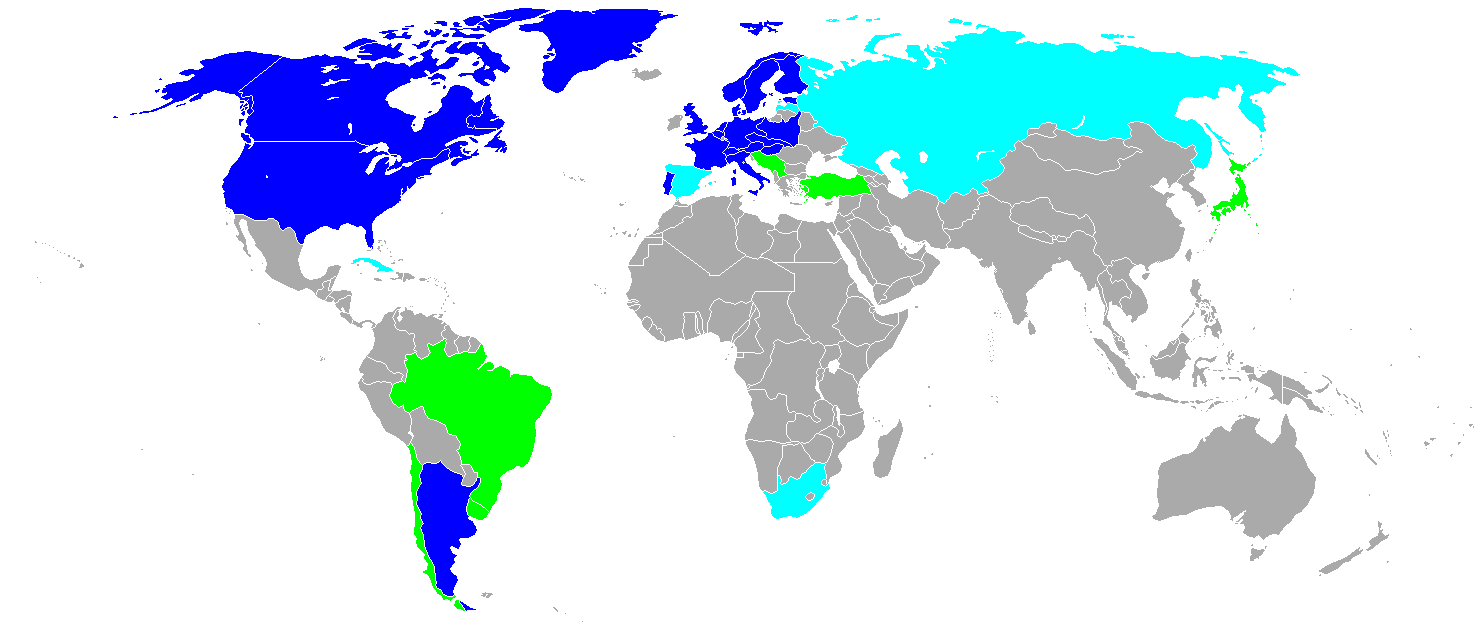
Map of Participating Sailing Countries at the 1936 Summer Olympics ● Green = Participating for the first time ● Blue = Participating ● Light Blue = Have previously participated

- Argentina (11)
- Austria (1)
- Belgium (3)
- Brazil (1)
- Canada (1)
- Chile (1)
- Czechoslovakia (2)
- Denmark (7)
- Estonia (1)
- Finland (12)
- France (14)
- Germany (14)
- Great Britain (14)
- Hungary (1)
- Italy (14)
- Japan (3)
- Netherlands (8)
- Norway (14)
- Poland (7)
- Portugal (3)
- Sweden (15)
- Switzerland (6)
- Turkey (3)
- United States (14)
- Uruguay (1)
- Yugoslavia (1)

=== Classes (equipment) ===
The 1936 Olympic classes
Class	Type	Venue	Event	Sailors	First OG	Olympics so far
O-Jolle	Dinghy	Kiel		Max. 1 Max. 1 substitute	1936	1
Star	Keelboat	Kiel		Max. 2 Max. 2 substitutes	1932	2
6 Metre	Keelboat	Kiel		Max. 5 Max. 5 substitutes	1908	7
8 Metre	Keelboat	Kiel		Max. 6 Max. 6 substitutes	1908	7
Legend: = Mixed gender event
The 1936 Olympic Classes in action O-Jolle Star 6 Metre 8 Metre

== Race schedule ==
●	Opening ceremony	●	Event competitions	●	Final races	●	Closing ceremony

Date	August									
Date	3rd Sat	4th Sun	5th Mon	6th Tue	7th Wed	8th Thu	9th Fri	10th Sat	11th Sun	12th Mon
Sailing (planning)		● ● ● ●	● ● ● ●	● ● ● ●	● ● ● ●	● ● ● ●	● ● ● ●	● ● ● ●		Spare day
Total gold medals								4		
Ceremonies	●									●

== Medal summary ==
Event	Gold	Silver	Bronze
1936: O-Jolle	Netherlands (NED); Daan Kagchelland	Germany (GER); Werner Krogmann	Great Britain (GBR); Peter Scott
1936: Star	Germany (GER); Peter Bischoff; Hans-Joachim Weise	Sweden (SWE); Arvid Laurin; Uno Wallentin	Netherlands (NED); Bob Maas; Willem de Vries Lentsch
1936: 6 Metre	Great Britain (GBR); Christopher Boardman; Miles Bellville; Russell Harmer; Charles Leaf; Leonard Martin	Norway (NOR); Magnus Konow; Karsten Konow; Fredrik Meyer; Vaadjuv Nyqvist; Alf Tveten	Sweden (SWE); Sven Salén; Lennart Ekdahl; Martin Hindorff; Torsten Lord; Dagmar Salén
1936: 8 Metre	Italy (ITA); Giovanni Reggio; Bruno Bianchi; Luigi De Manincor; Domenico Mordini; Enrico Poggi; Luigi Poggi	Norway (NOR); Olaf Ditlev-Simonsen; John Ditlev-Simonsen; Hans Struksnæs; Lauritz Schmidt; Jacob Thams; Nordahl Wallem	Germany (GER); Hans Howaldt; Fritz Bischoff; Alfried Krupp von Bohlen und Halbach; Eduard Mohr; Felix Scheder-Bieschin; Otto Wachs

== Medal table ==
Rank	Nation	Gold	Silver	Bronze	Total
1	Germany	1	1	1	3
2	Great Britain	1	0	1	2
2	Netherlands	1	0	1	2
4	Italy	1	0	0	1
5	Norway	0	2	0	2
6	Sweden	0	1	1	2
Totals (6 entries)		4	4	4	12

== Notes ==
- A floating transmission station was used for reporting the race events to shore.
- New media was also used in the protest room. On the footage made from a Zeppelin, for the film Olympia of Leni Riefenstahl, an incident was observed by the jury between Sweden and Finland in race No. VI of the 8 Metre. As result both teams were disqualified.

== Other information ==
=== Sailing ===
- This Summer Olympics established sailing as a full mature Olympic sport after a long struggle to get a unified International standard set of rules.
- Each Olympic Gold medalist was also given a plant during the prize giving ceremony.
- Spain withdrew from sailing before the opening ceremony, as part of its boycott of the 1936 Summer Olympics.
- The Swiss 6 Metre was eliminated for all races since the helmsmen turned out not to be an amateur.
- Many protests in the Metre classes were filed. Speculations were made about whether this was due to the scoring system. One of the reasons was probably the close racing.
- The Olympic flame was burning on a Hanseatic galleon in the harbor of Kiel.
- In total a number of 257 participants were entered. 169 of them competed, the others were reserves or team managers and so on.

=== Sailors ===
During the sailing regattas at the 1936 Summer Olympics among others the following persons were competing in the various classes:

- Netherlands, Daan Kagchelland in the O-Jolle is among the first sailors that did physical exercises on structural basis. Therefore, he was able to compensate his light body weight during heavy air races.
- Germany, Alfried Krupp von Bohlen und Halbach in the 8 Metre, played an important role for Germany in World War II.
- Great Britain, Peter Scott in the O-Jolle became later one of the presidents of the IYRU. He also was the one who advised to put the trapeze on the Flying Dutchman.
Sailors at the 1936 Olympic Games
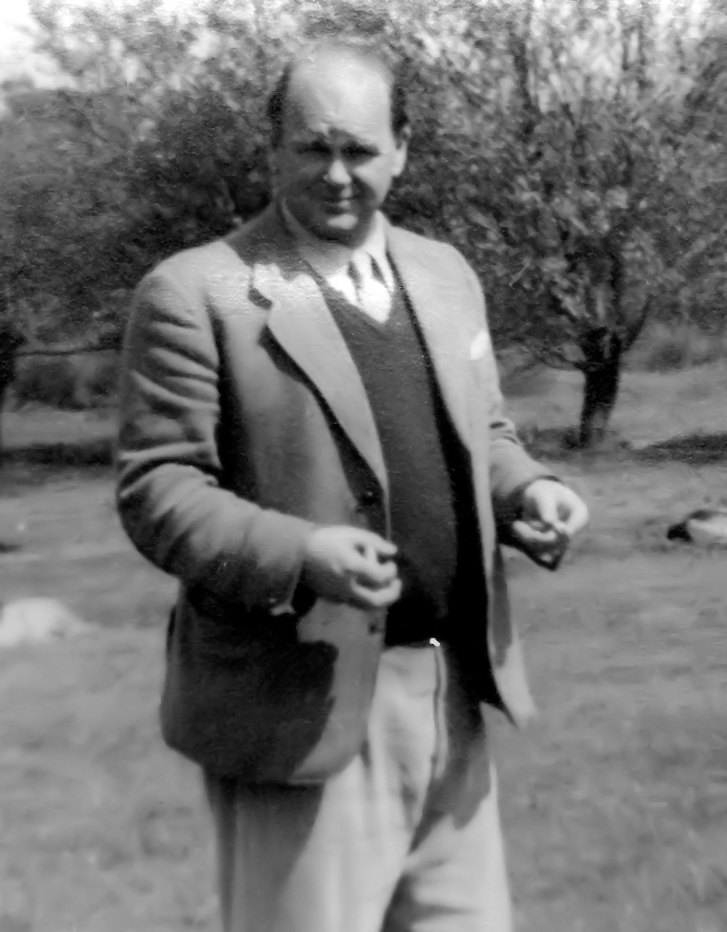
In O-Jolle:
Peter Scott

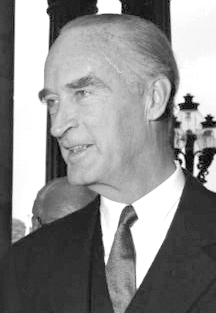
In 8 Metre:
Alfried Krupp von Bohlen und Halbach (Owner/Crewmember).

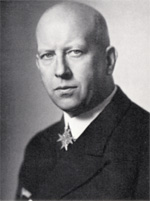
In 8 Metre:
Hans Howaldt (Skipper).
