= Oberti =

Oberti is a surname. Notable people with the surname include:

- Daniel Oberti (1945–2009), American artist, sculptor, teacher, lecturer, and mentor
- Giuliano Oberti (1901–?), Italian sailor
- Jacques Oberti (born 1960), French politician
- Massimo Oberti (1901–?), Italian sailor
- Paolo Oberti (died 1567), Roman Catholic prelate
