= Särklass =

Särklass may refer to:

- Särklass A, sailing class
- Särklass C, sailing class
