= Luigi Poggi (disambiguation) =

Luigi Poggi (1917–2010) was an Italian cardinal.

Luigi Poggi may also refer to:

- Luigi Poggi (sailor) (1906–1972), Italian sailor

== See also ==
- Louis Poggi (footballer), French footballer
