= Morgan Adams =

Morgan Adams may refer to:

- Morgan Adams (Cutthroat Island), the main character in the film Cutthroat Island
- Morgan Adams (sailor) (1915–2004), American sailor
