= Charles Garner =

Charles Garner may refer to:

- Charles Garner (footballer), English footballer
- Charles Garner (sailor) (1906–1966), American sailor
- Charles Garner, a pen name used by Kim Philby, a British journalist, intelligencer office, and double agent

== See also ==
- Garner (surname)
