= Gelbert =

Gelbert is a surname. Notable people with the surname include:

- Alexandre Gelbert (1910–1988), Swiss sailor
- Carlos Gelbert (born 1948), Australian writer
- Charlie Gelbert (1906–1967), American baseball player
- Charlie Gelbert (American football) (1871–1936), American football player
- Charles Gelbert Neese (1916–1989), American judge
