= Sven Grönblom =

Finnish sailor

Personal information
- Nationality: Finnish
- Born: 29 December 1913; Turku, Finland
- Died: 23 August 2006 (aged 92); Helsinki, Finland

Sport
- Sport: Sailing

Sven Grönblom (29 December 1913 – 23 August 2006) was a Finnish sailor. He competed in the 8 Metre event at the 1936 Summer Olympics.
