= John Wallace (sailor) =

American sailor

Personal information
- Birth name: John Donald Wallace
- Born: July 8, 1903; Prescott, Wisconsin, U.S.
- Died: September 21, 1990 (aged 87); Santa Barbara County, California, U.S.

John Wallace (July 8, 1903 – September 21, 1990) was an American sailor. He competed in the mixed 6 metres at the 1936 Summer Olympics.

== Personal life ==
Wallace served in the United States Navy during World War II.
