= Beryl Preston =

British sailor (1901–1979)

Personal information
- Nationality: British
- Born: 2 November 1901 Ningbo, China
- Died: 22 October 1979 (aged 77) Tetbury, England

Sport
- Sport: Sailing

Beryl Preston (2 November 1901 – 22 October 1979) was a British sailor. She competed in the 8 Metre event at the 1936 Summer Olympics.
