= Vagn Kastrup =

Danish sailor

Personal information
- Nationality: Danish
- Born: 18 May 1905; Randers, Denmark
- Died: 8 July 1976 (aged 71); Aabybro, Denmark

Sport
- Sport: Sailing

Vagn Kastrup (18 May 1905 – 8 July 1976) was a Danish sailor. He competed in the 8 Metre event at the 1936 Summer Olympics.
