= Joseph Compton (sailor) =

British sailor

Personal information
- Nationality: British
- Born: 25 September 1900; Lewisham, England
- Died: 19 September 1965 (aged 64); Welbeck, England

Sport
- Sport: Sailing

Joseph Neild Compton (25 September 1900 – 19 September 1965) was a British sailor. He competed in the 8 Metre event at the 1936 Summer Olympics.
