= Germán Frers (sailor) =

Argentine sailor

Personal information
- Birth name: Germán Julio Frers Lynch
- Born: 10 September 1899; Buenos Aires, Argentina
- Died: 6 July 1986 (aged 86)

Germán Julio Frers Lynch (10 September 1899 – 6 July 1986) was an Argentine sailor. He competed in the mixed 6 metres at the 1936 Summer Olympics.
