= Luigi De Manincor =

Italian sailor

Medal record

Sailing

Representing Italy

Olympic Games
| Gold medal – first place | 1936 Berlin | 8 metre class |

Luigi De Manincor (Rovinj, 14 July 1910 – 13 February 1986) was an Italian sailor who competed in the 1936 Summer Olympics and in the 1948 Summer Olympics.

In 1936 he was a crew member of the Italian boat Italia which won the gold medal in the 8 metre class competition.

In 1948 he finished fifth as a crew member of the Italian boat Ausonia in the Dragon.
