= Henri Bachet =

French sailor

Personal information
- Nationality: French
- Born: 22 November 1906

Sport
- Sport: Sailing

Henri Bachet (born 22 November 1906, date of death unknown) was a French sailor. He competed in the 8 Metre event at the 1936 Summer Olympics.
