= Kurt Frey =

German sailor (1913–1993)

Personal information
- Nationality: German
- Born: 11 August 1913; Kiel, German Empire
- Died: 19 December 1993 (aged 80)

Kurt Frey (11 August 1913 – 19 December 1993) was a German sailor. He competed in the mixed 6 metres at the 1936 Summer Olympics.

== Personal life ==
Frey served in the Kriegsmarine during the Second World War and was taken prisoner by Soviet forces. He became a UNESCO official after his release.
