= Hai (keelboat) =

- Class symbol

Development
- Designer: Gunnar L. Stenbäck
- Year: 1930
- Design: One-Design

Boat
- Crew: 3
- Draft: 1.1 m (3 ft 7 in)

Hull
- Type: Monohull
- Hull weight: 1,700 kg (3,700 lb)
- LOA: 9.6 m (31 ft)
- LWL: 6.6 m (22 ft)
- Beam: 1.9 m (6 ft 3 in)

Hull appendages
- Keel: Fixed

Sails
- Spinnaker area: 30 m^{2} (320 sq ft)
- Upwind sail area: 21.5 m^{2} (231 sq ft)

Hai (Finnish, lit. Shark) or Requin (French, lit. Shark) is a one-design, sloop-rigged keelboat designed in Finland. It was designed in 1930 by Finnish sailboat designer Gunnar Stenbäck as a cheap racing and cruising yacht suitable for mass production. It remains a popular small yacht in Finland and France.

== History ==
In the 1920s, one-design yacht classes were relatively scarce and various construction classes dominated yacht racing. These boats were designed and built one at the time, and thus were quite expensive. Many Nordic top sailors and designers expressed concern about the future of the sport, and Stenbäck argued strongly that only in a one-design class could the costs be kept suitably low. As a result, the Hai design specified inexpensive materials (Northern pine and oak, iron ballast instead of lead) and relatively small sail area so that winches were not required. The keel was long and shallow to ensure safety on rocky Baltic waters.

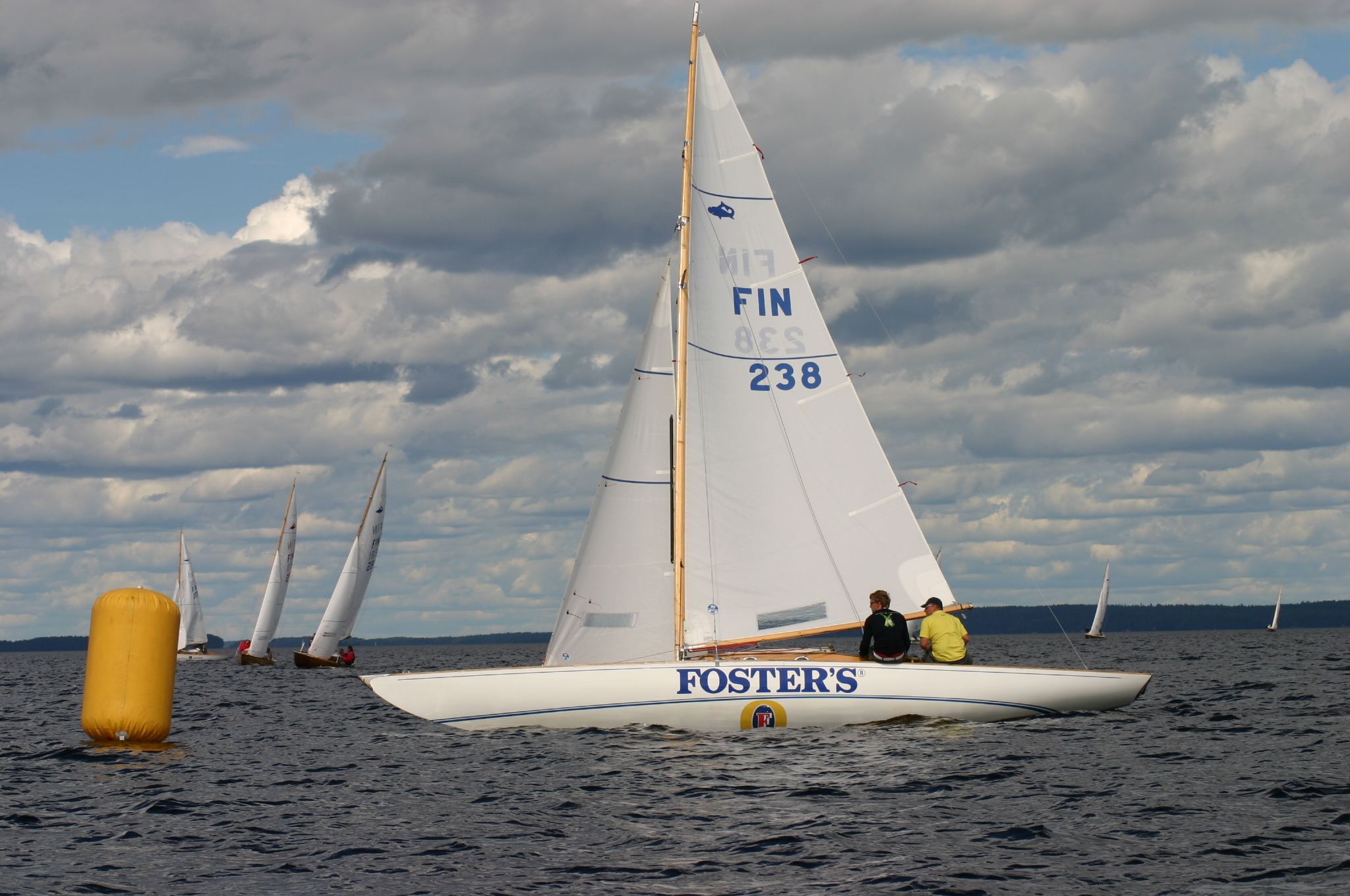
Finnish Hai boats in a race.

Stenbäck presented his design in 1930. The first boat was built and presented to the public next year and the design soon proved popular; many yards began constructing the class. The HSS yachtclub in Helsinki was instrumental in giving impetus to the class before World War II. Boats were also exported: around 100 boats to France, some thirty to USA and also to Germany, Sweden and the Baltic countries. However, the class rules' requirement of Finnish-made sails slowed down growth abroad and although this was later relaxed, no international class association was ever set up. After World War II, the Hai faced stiff competition from the Nordic Folkboat and the Dragon (which was accepted as Olympic class) and it never achieved same international status. However, it was the biggest keelboat class in Finland until the 1960s, when it was supplanted by Hans Groop's H-boat, also a class initiated by HSS. Despite this, it remains an active competition class and construction of new boats has continued to the day, although in dwindling numbers. In total, around 290 boats have been registered in Finland. The Finnish Hai is somewhat unusual in that it has remained very similar to its original form, with wooden hulls and spars - GRP boats are not allowed.

== French Requin ==
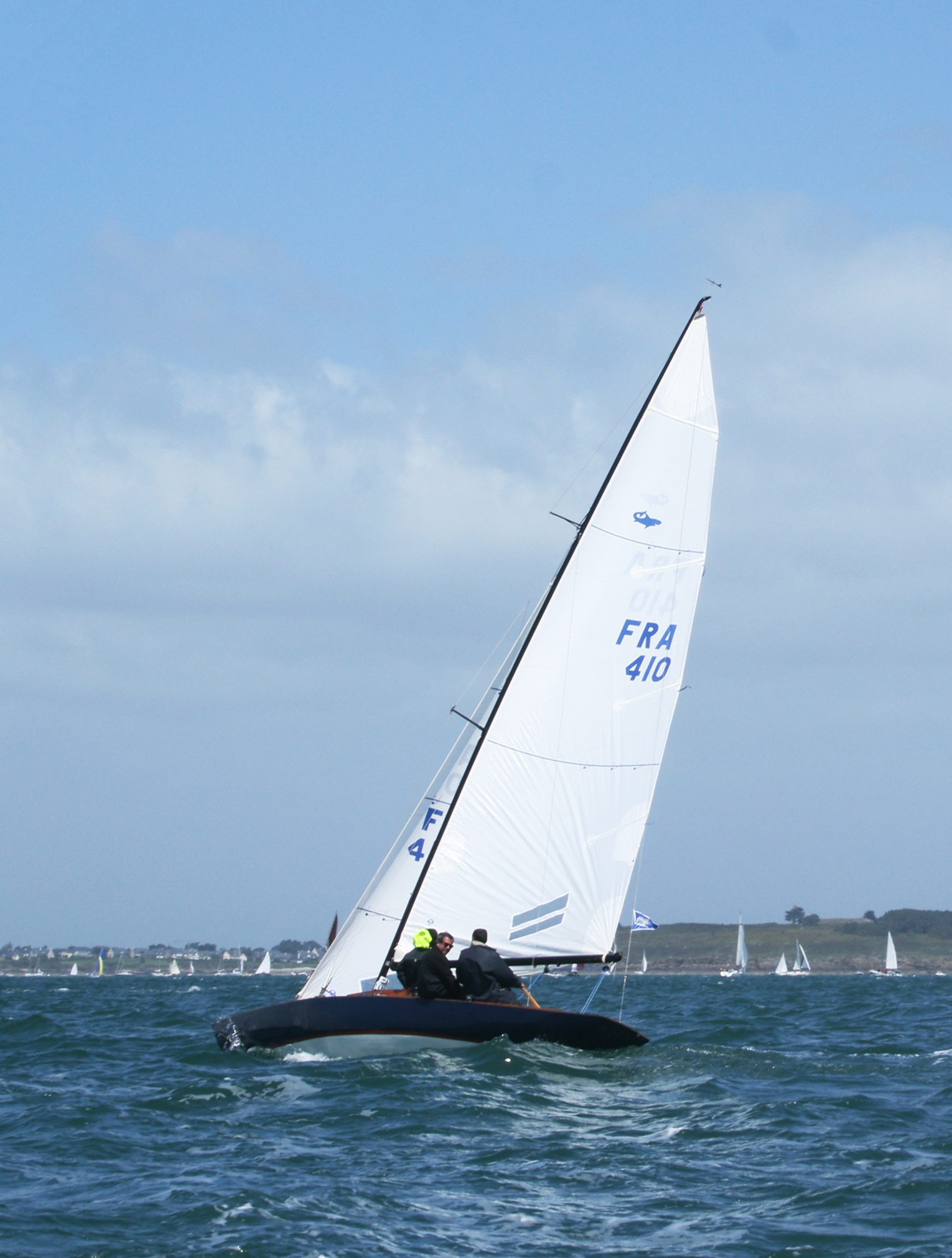
French Requin. Note the aluminium mast.

In France the boat (known as Requin) gained a large following, and to date nearly 500 boats have been registered. Owing to the lack of an authoritative international class association, the Requin evolved independently from the Finnish class. Plastic is nowadays allowed as a hull material, as is aluminium for spars. Sail area is also significantly larger: 22.1 square metres (238 sq ft) for mainsail and 6.93 square metres (74.6 sq ft) for jib. A Genoa is also allowed in the Requin.

== Hai 2000 ==
A modernized Finnish GRP variant of Hai, with the hull based on Requin and aluminium spars. Mainsail 16.5 square metres (178 sq ft), jib 9.5 square metres (102 sq ft), spinnaker 36 square metres (390 sq ft). Some wooden Hai boats have also been rigged to the newer Hai 2000 class standard.

== International competition ==
Though as noted, Hai has never been a major international competition class, some regattas between boats from different countries have been organized, especially in the 1930s when the boat was gaining popularity around the Baltic, but also in recent years, featuring boats from Finland, Germany and France.

== See also ==
- Särklass A
- Särklass C
