= Jorge Linck =

Argentine sailor

Personal information
- Birth name: Jorge Luis Linck
- Born: 26 March 1915; Buenos Aires, Argentina
- Died: 27 January 2007 (aged 91); Buenos Aires, Argentina

Jorge Luis Linck (26 March 1915 – 27 January 2007) was an Argentine sailor. He competed in the mixed 6 metres at the 1936 Summer Olympics.
