= Holger Sumelius =

Finnish sailor (1901–1976)

Personal information
- Nickname: Harry
- Nationality: Finnish
- Born: Holger Rafael Sumelius; 28 December 1901 Tampere, Grand Duchy of Finland
- Died: 6 December 1976 (aged 74) Espoo, Finland

Sailing career
- Sport: Sailing

Holger Sumelius (28 December 1901 – 6 December 1976) was a Finnish sailor. He competed in the mixed 6 metres at the 1936 Summer Olympics.
