= Gunnar Stenbäck =

Finnish sailor

Personal information
- Nationality: Finnish
- Born: October 31, 1880; Helsinki, Finland
- Died: February 3, 1947 (aged 66); Helsinki, Finland

Sailing career
- Class: 6 Metre
- Club: Nyländska Jaktklubben

Gunnar Stenbäck (October 31, 1880 – February 3, 1947) was a sailor from the Finland, who represented his native country at the Sailing at the 1912 Summer Olympics – 6 Metre in Nynäshamn, Sweden. He was also known for designing the Hai. His son was Ragnar Stenbäck.

== Sources ==
- "Gunnar Stenbäck Bio, Stats, and Results". Olympic Sports. Sports-Reference.com. Archived from the original on 17 April 2020.
- Swedish Olympic Committee (1913). Erik Bergvall (ed.). The Olympic Games of Stockholm 1912 – Official Report (PDF). Wahlström & Widstrand. Archived from the original (PDF) on 29 October 2012.
