= Leonard Martin =

British sailor

Medal record

Sailing

Representing Great Britain

Olympic Games
Gold medal – first place	1936 Berlin	6 metre class

Leonard Jack Martin (24 November 1901 – 25 December 1967) was a British sailor who competed in the 1936 Summer Olympics. In 1936 he was a crew member of the British boat Lalage which won the gold medal in the 6 metre class.
