= Otto Gunnar Danielsen =

Danish sailor (1911–1958)

Personal information
- Nationality: Danish
- Born: 4 February 1911 Copenhagen, Denmark
- Died: 13 March 1958 (aged 47)

Sport
- Sport: Sailing

Otto Gunnar Danielsen (4 February 1911 – 13 March 1958) was a Danish sailor. He competed in the 8 Metre event at the 1936 Summer Olympics.
