= Janusz Zalewski =

Polish sailor (1903–1944)

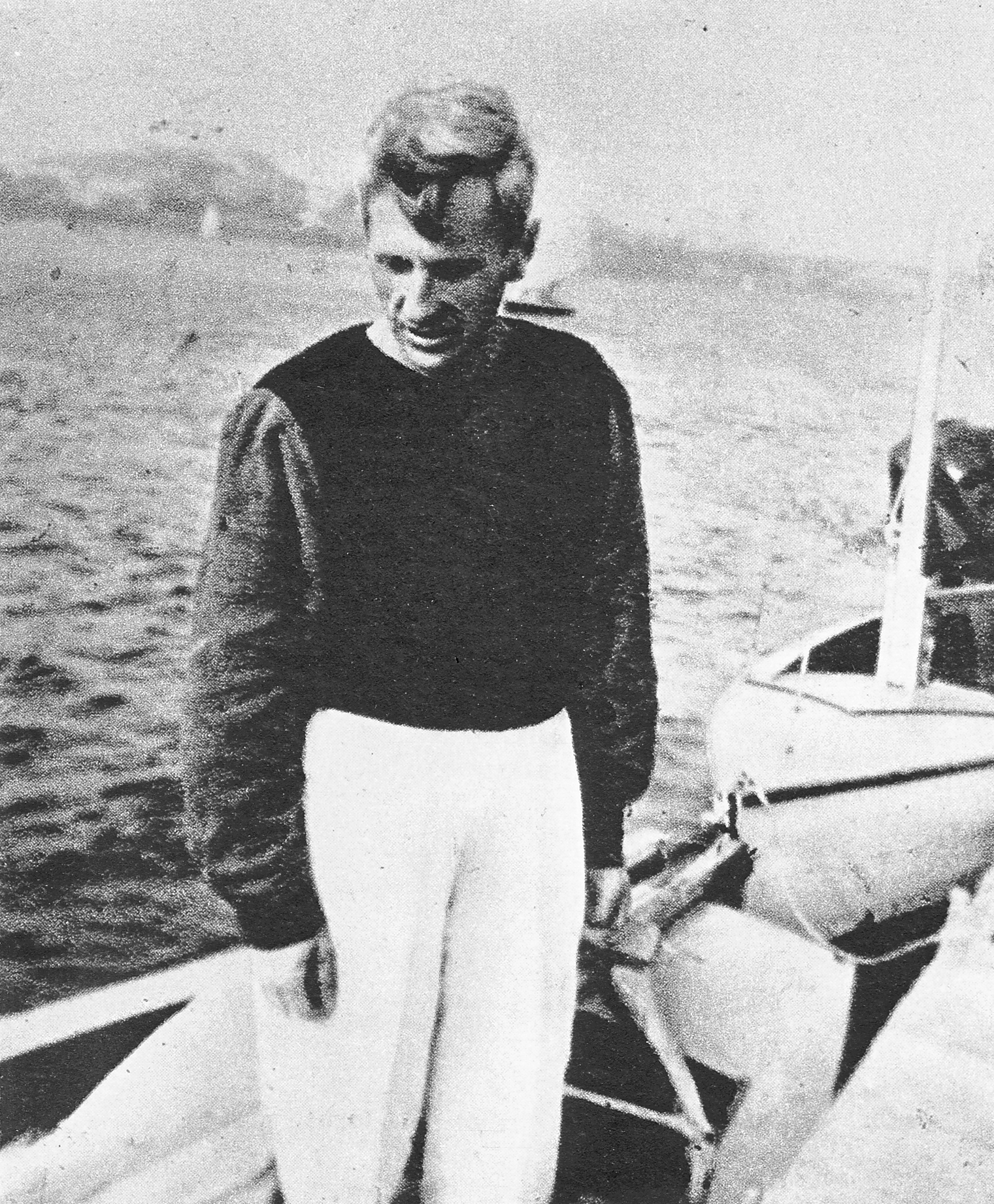

Personal information
- Nationality: Polish
- Born: Janusz Rajmund Zalewski; 15 August 1903 Zawiercie, Congress Poland
- Died: 6 August 1944 (aged 40) Wola, Warsaw, German-occupied Poland

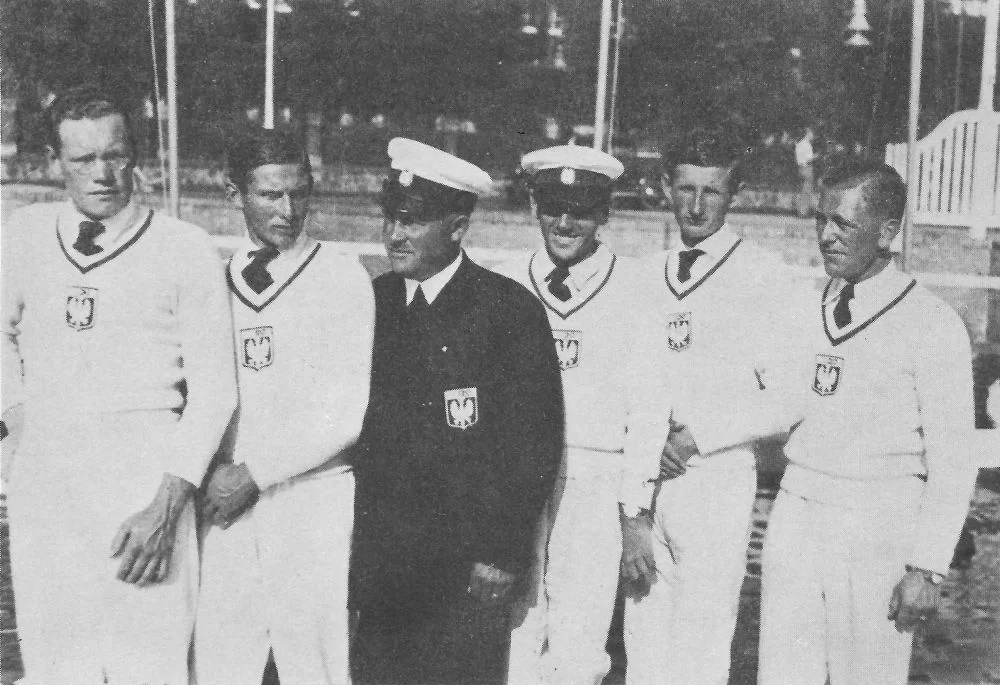
The Polish mixed 6 metres sailing team in 1936. Zalewski is third from the right.

Janusz Rajmund Zalewski (15 August 1903 – 6 August 1944) was a Polish sailor. He competed in the mixed 6 metres at the 1936 Summer Olympics. Zalewski was wounded during the Warsaw Uprising and was killed in reprisals for the rebellion.

== Personal life ==
Zalewski served in the Warsaw Uprising as part of the Home Army during the Second World War. He was wounded on 1 August attacking German supply warehouses, and was sent to recover at a hospital in Wola. He was killed on 6 August by German soldiers during the Wola massacre.
