= Mario Ortíz (sailor) =

Argentine sailor

Personal information
- Nationality: Argentine
- Born: 21 November 1911

Sport
- Sport: Sailing

Mario Ortíz (born 21 November 1911, date of death unknown) was an Argentine sailor. He competed in the 8 Metre event at the 1936 Summer Olympics.
