= Edelf Hosmann =

Argentine sailor

Edelf Hossmann
Personal information
- Birth name: Edelf Ernesto Hossmann Frers
- Born: 29 August 1901; Buenos Aires, Argentina
- Died: 6 April 1989 (aged 87); Buenos Aires, Argentina

Edelf Ernesto Hossmann (29 August 1901 – 6 April 1989) was an Argentine sailor. He competed in the mixed 6 metres at the 1936 Summer Olympics.
