= Józef Szajba =

Polish sailor

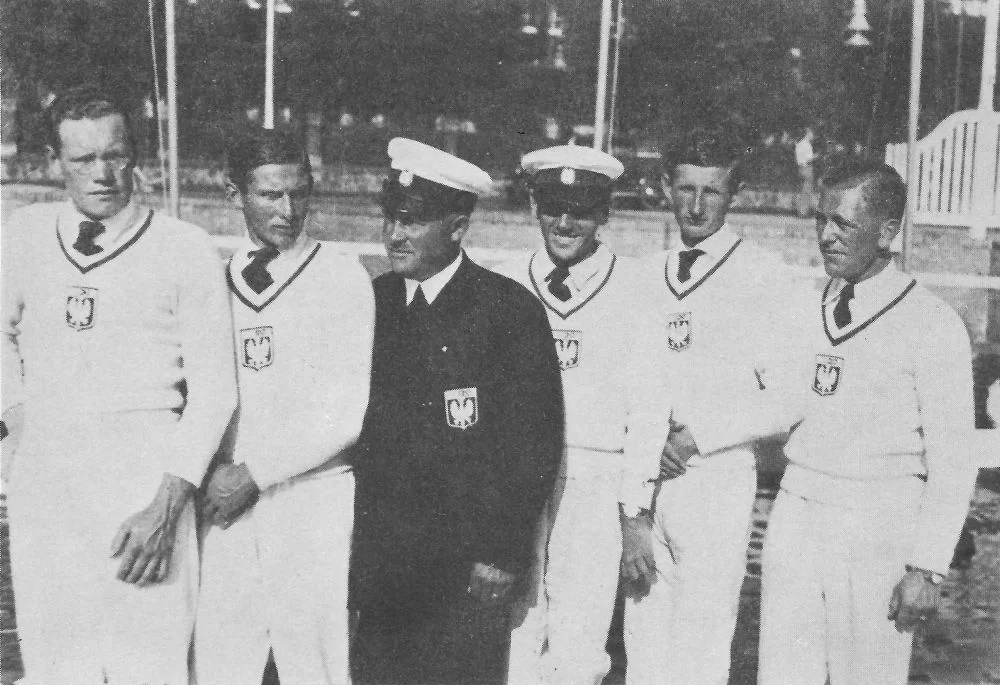
- The Polish mixed 6 metres sailing team in 1936. Szajba is second from the right.

Personal information
- Nationality: Polish
- Born: 14 January 1910; Lubelskie, Congress Poland
- Died: 1945 (aged 34–35); Potulice, German-occupied Poland

Józef Szajba (14 January 1910 – 1945) was a Polish sailor. He competed in the mixed 6 metres at the 1936 Summer Olympics. Szajba was murdered by Nazis in 1945.
