= Hilding Silander =

Finnish sailor

Personal information
- Nationality: Finnish
- Born: 1 March 1893; Porvoo, Finland
- Died: 20 October 1972 (aged 79); Helsinki, Finland

Sport
- Sport: Sailing

Hilding Silander (1 March 1893 – 20 October 1972) was a Finnish sailor. He competed in the 8 Metre event at the 1936 Summer Olympics.
