= Eduard Firmenich-Richartz =

German art historian (1864 – 1923)

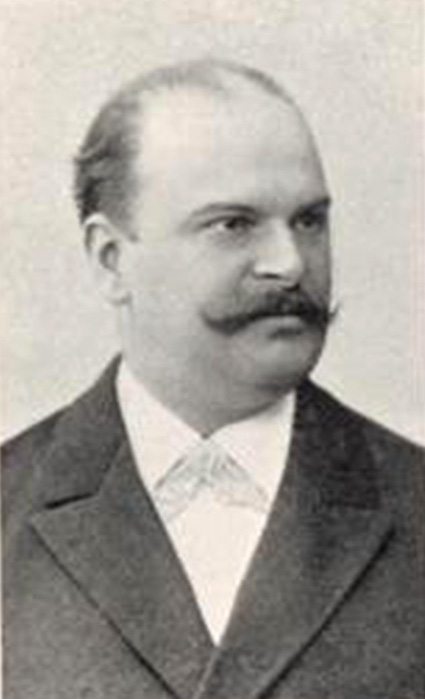
Eduard Firmenich-Richartz (ca. 1904)

Eduard Firmenich-Richartz (30 August 1864 – 29 July 1923) was a German art historian.

== Early life and career ==
He was the son of the writer Johann Matthias Firmenich-Richartz and received his schooling in Bonn. He pursued art history studies starting in 1886 at the universities of Bonn, Berlin, Vienna, Munich, and Strasbourg. He earned his doctorate in 1891 from the University of Strasbourg under Carl Justi. By February 1896, Firmenich-Richartz completed his habilitation at the University of Bonn, subsequently becoming an associate professor in 1904, an honorary professor in 1917, and an extraordinary professor in 1921.

His area of expertise was in ancient Cologne painting. In 1895, along with Hermann Keussen, he published a revised and expanded edition of Johann Jakob Merlo's compilation, 'Kölnische Künstler in alter und neuer Zeit' (Cologne Artists in Old and New Times). Serving on the board of the art historical exhibition at the Kunstpalast in Düsseldorf in 1904, Firmenich-Richartz was highly regarded as an exceptional connoisseur of older Dutch and Lower Rhine painting. In preparation for the Düsseldorf exhibition, he embarked on extensive travels along the Rhine to uncover lesser-known paintings.

He lived on Colmantstraße in Bonn and owned an extensive library, which was auctioned off after his death in May 1925. In 1914, he was among the signatories of the Declaration of the University Professors of the German Reich. Following his death, he was buried on July 31, 1923, at the Poppelsdorf Cemetery.

== Publications ==
- Firmenich-Richartz, Eduard (1891). Bartholomaeus Bruyn und seine Schule. Eine kunsthistorische Studie (wl). Beiträge zur Kunstgeschichte. Vol. Neue Folge, 14. Leipzig: E. A. Seemann.
- Firmenich Richartz, Eduard (1891). "Meister Wilhelm. Eine Studie zur Geschichte der altkölnischen Malerei". Zeitschrift für christliche Kunst (wl). 4: 239–254. ISSN 0935-7041.
- Firmenich-Richartz, Eduard (1895). Keussen, Hermann (ed.). Kölnische Künstler in alter und neuer Zeit. Johann Jacob Merlos neu bearbeitete und erweiterte Nachrichten von dem Leben und den Werken Kölnischer Künstler (wl). Düsseldorf: L. Schwann.
- Firmenich-Richartz, Eduard (1905). Clemen, Paul (ed.). Meisterwerke westdeutscher Malerei und andere hervorragende Gemälde alter Meister aus Privatbesitz auf der Kunsthistorischen Ausstellung zu Düsseldorf 1904 (wl). München: F. Bruckmann.
- Die Brüder Boisserée. Erster Band: Sulpiz und Melchior Boisserée als Kunstsammler. Ein Beitrag zur Geschichte der Romantik (wl). Leipzig: E. Diederich. 1916.

== Literature ==
Marx, Friedrich (1923). Zur Erinnerung an Eduard Firmenich-Richartz. Rede gehalten an seinem Grabe auf dem Friedhofe von Poppelsdorf am 31. Juli 1923. Röhrscheid, Bonn.
