= Ernest Granier =

French sailor (1907–1993)

Personal information
- Nationality: French
- Born: 15 May 1907; Malicorne-sur-Sarthe, France
- Died: 16 January 1993 (aged 85); Hyères, France

Sport
- Sport: Sailing

Ernest Granier (15 May 1907 – 16 January 1993) was a French sailor. He competed in the 8 Metre event at the 1936 Summer Olympics.
