= Walter Kjellberg =

Finnish sailor

Personal information
- Nationality: Finnish
- Born: 10 October 1901; Turku, Finland
- Died: 14 September 1955 (aged 53); Lauritsala, Finland

Sport
- Sport: Sailing

Walter Kjellberg (10 October 1901 – 14 September 1955) was a Finnish sailor. He competed in the 8 Metre event at the 1936 Summer Olympics.
