= Gunnar Grönblom =

Finnish sailor

Personal information
- Nationality: Finnish
- Born: 15 March 1895; Turku, Finland
- Died: 7 August 1939 (aged 44); Helsinki, Finland

Sport
- Sport: Sailing

Gunnar Grönblom (15 March 1895 – 7 August 1939) was a Finnish sailor. He competed in the 8 Metre event at the 1936 Summer Olympics.
