= Stanislaw Zalewski =

Polish sailor

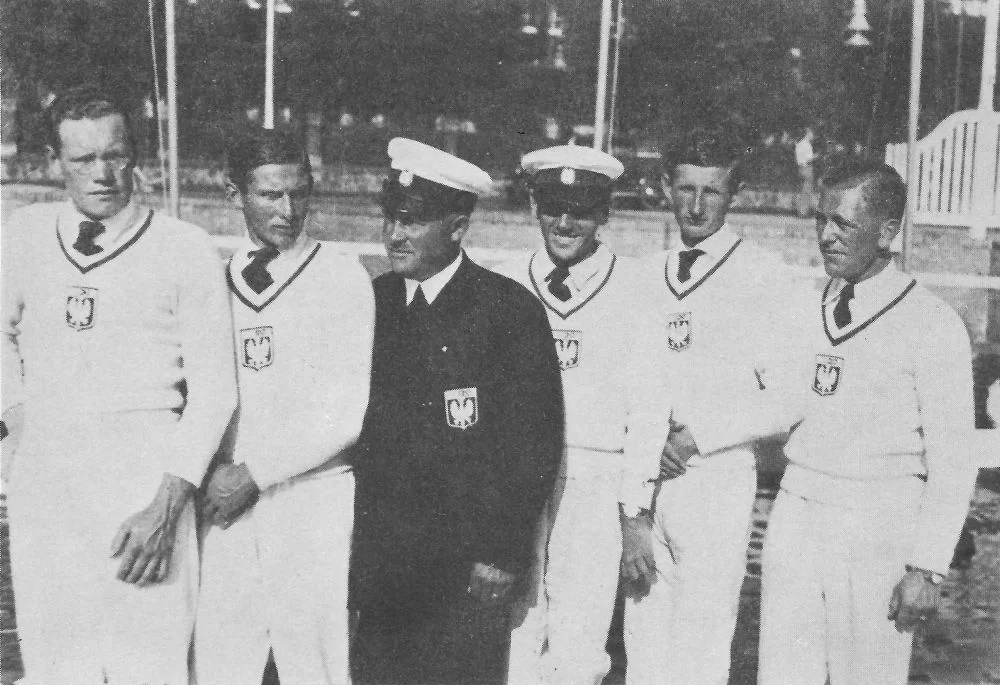
- The Polish mixed 6 metres sailing team in 1936. Zalewski is first from the right.

Personal information
- Nationality: Polish
- Born: 16 December 1907; Kutno, Congress Poland
- Died: 23 December 1992 (aged 85); Warsaw, Poland

Stanislaw Zalewski (16 December 1907 – 23 December 1992) was a Polish sailor. He competed in the mixed 6 metres in the 1936 Summer Olympics.
