= Frederick Shick =

American competitive sailor (1914–1992)

Personal information
- Born: February 5, 1914 Bethlehem, Pennsylvania, United States
- Died: August 9, 1992 (aged 78) Naples, Florida, United States

Sport
- Sport: Sailing

Frederick Shick (February 5, 1914 – August 9, 1992) was an American sailor. He competed in the 8 Metre event at the 1936 Summer Olympics.
