= Dietrich Christensen =

German sailor

Personal information
- Nationality: German
- Born: 19 February 1909

Dietrich Christensen (born 19 February 1909, date of death unknown) was a German sailor. He competed in the mixed 6 metres at the 1936 Summer Olympics.
