= Yngve Pacius =

Finnish sailor (1886–1962)

Personal information
- Nationality: Finnish
- Born: Yngve Evert Pacius; 14 June 1886 Raahe, Grand Duchy of Finland
- Died: 28 August 1962 (aged 76) Helsinki, Finland

Sailing career
- Sport: Sailing

Yngve Evert Pacius (14 June 1886 – 28 August 1962) was a Finnish sailor. He competed in the mixed 6 metres at the 1936 Summer Olympics.
