= Olof Wallin =

Finnish sailor

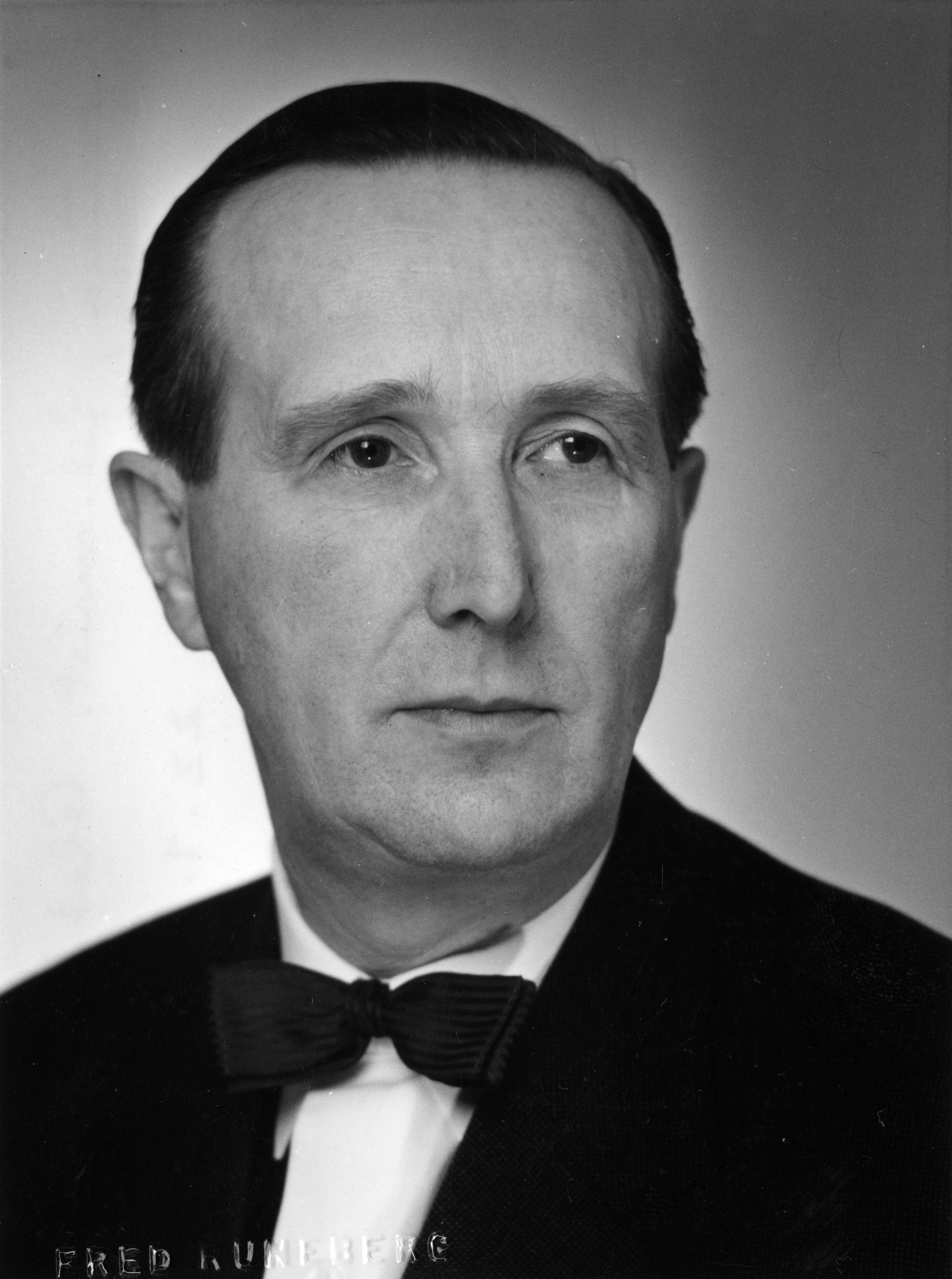
- 1963

Personal information
- Full name: Olof August Wallin
- Nationality: Finnish
- Born: 22 January 1913; Helsinki, Finland
- Died: 26 September 1971 (aged 58); Espoo, Finland

Sport
- Sport: Sailing

Olof Wallin (22 January 1913 – 26 September 1971) was a Finnish sailor. He competed in the 8 Metre event at the 1936 Summer Olympics.

Wallin studied science at the University of Helsinki and received Master's Degree in 1938.

Later, from 1961 on, he worked as a director at Finland Steamship Company where he had started his career in working life in 1938.
