= John Eddy (sailor) =

British sailor

Personal information
- Nationality: British
- Born: 14 March 1915
- Died: 16 April 1981 (aged 66); Leominster, England

Sport
- Sport: Sailing

John Noel Eddy (14 March 1915 – 16 April 1981) was a British sailor. He competed in the 8 Metre event at the 1936 Summer Olympics.
