= Juliusz Sieradzki =

Polish sailor (1912–1999)

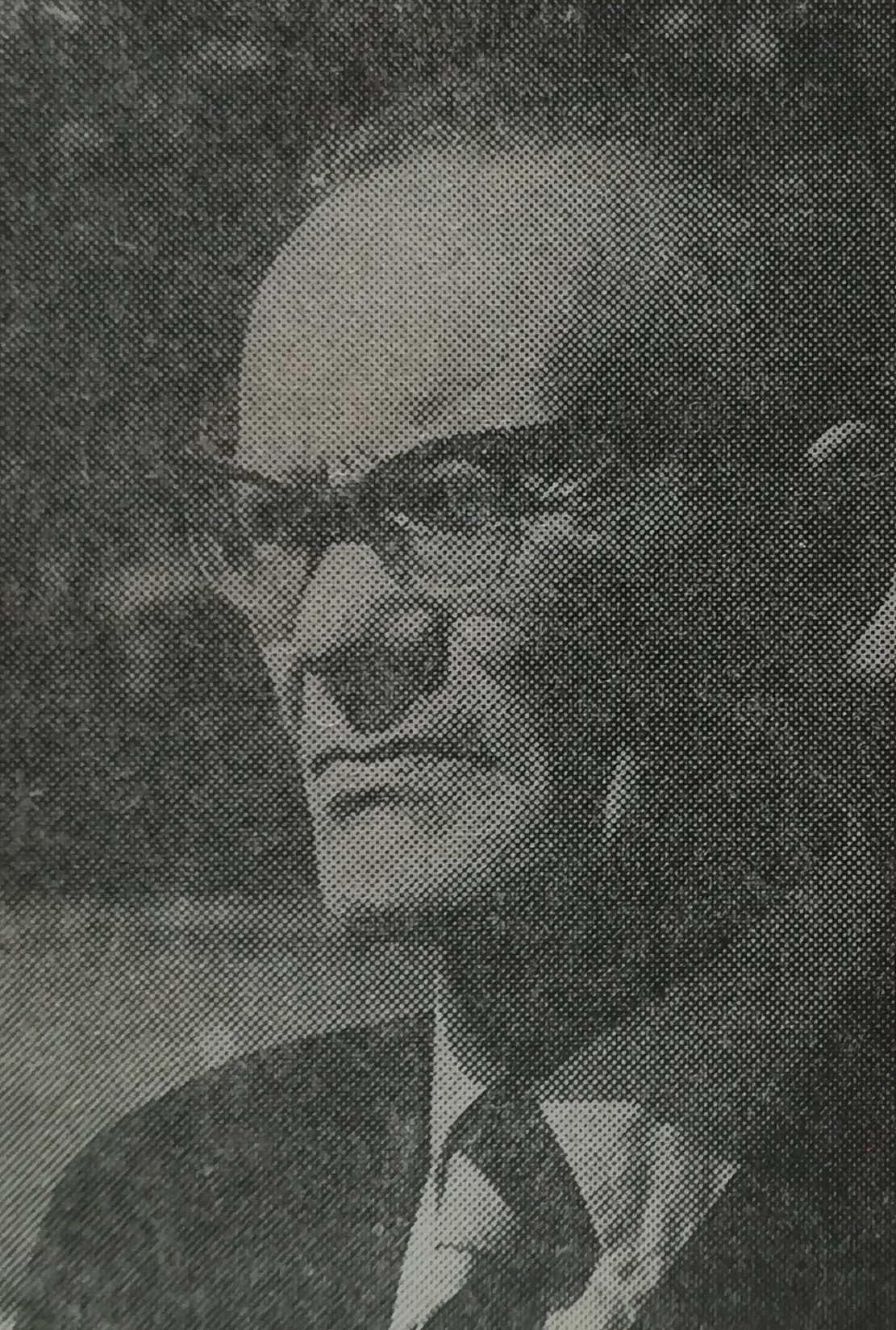
- Juliusz Sieradzki in 1985.

Personal information
- Nickname: Rebe
- Nationality: Polish
- Born: Juliusz Władysław Sieradzki; 23 February 1912 Lemberg, Austria-Hungary
- Died: 30 November 1999 (aged 87) Sopot, Poland

Juliusz Władysław Sieradzki (23 February 1912 – 30 November 1999) was a Polish sailor. He competed in the mixed 6 metres in the 1936 Summer Olympics.
