= Joseph Firmenich =

German artist

Joseph Firmenich (also spelt Josef Firmenich) (1821–1891) was a German painter. Firmenich was born in 1821 in Cologne and died in 1891 in Berlin. According to art historian Gustav Ebe, Firmenich was an autodidact who was a court painter in the Grand Duchy of Hesse, and painted natural landscapes from Tyrol and other regions. Other sources say that Firmenich was a student of Simon Meister. While visiting France, he once entered into a wager (worth a few champagne bottles and witnesses by artists) that German painters could paint more accurately than French painters. Firmenich painted an oak tree within an hour and won the challenge.

Paintings by Joseph Firmenich

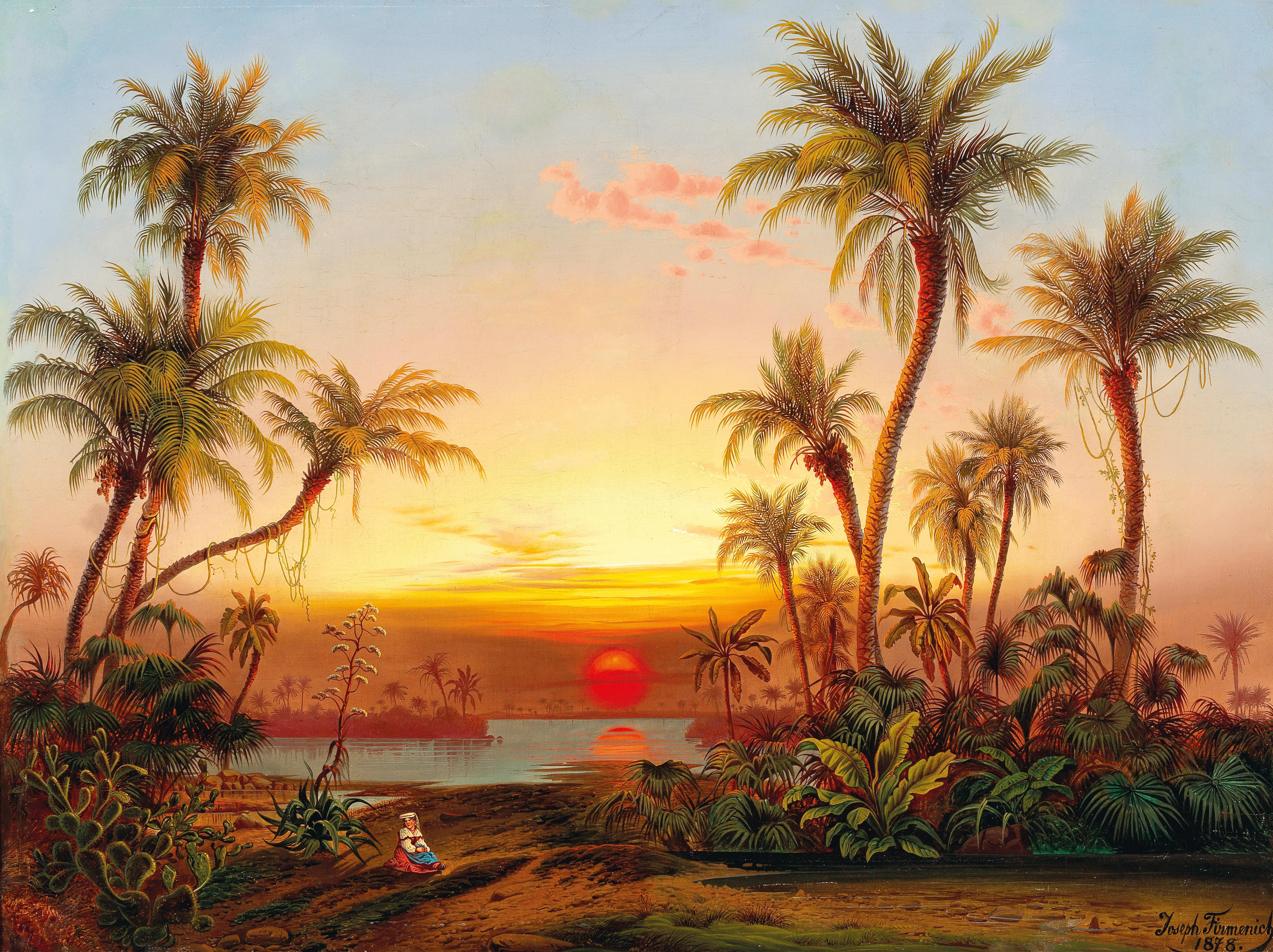
A Southern Landscape with Palms in the Evening Light (1878)

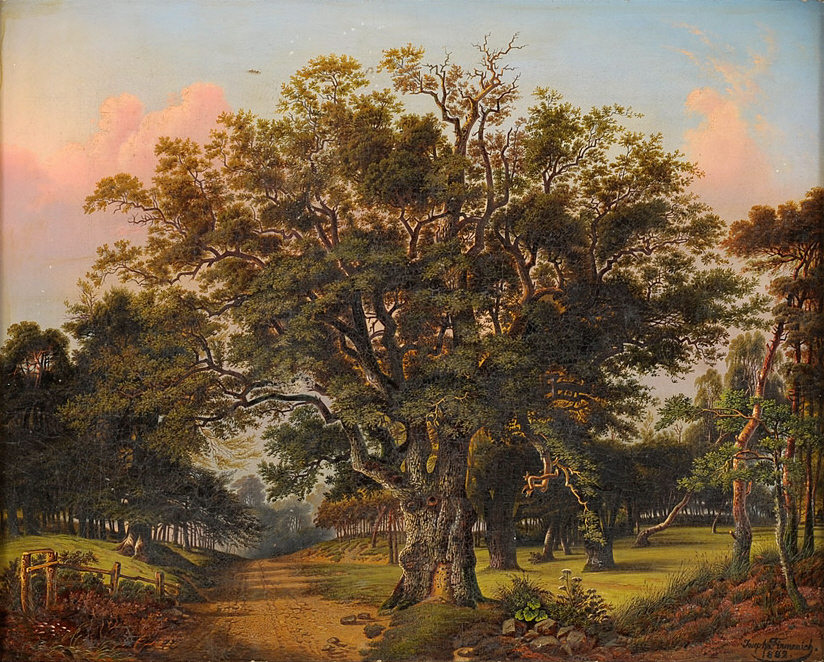
Alte Deutsche Kaisereiche (1882)

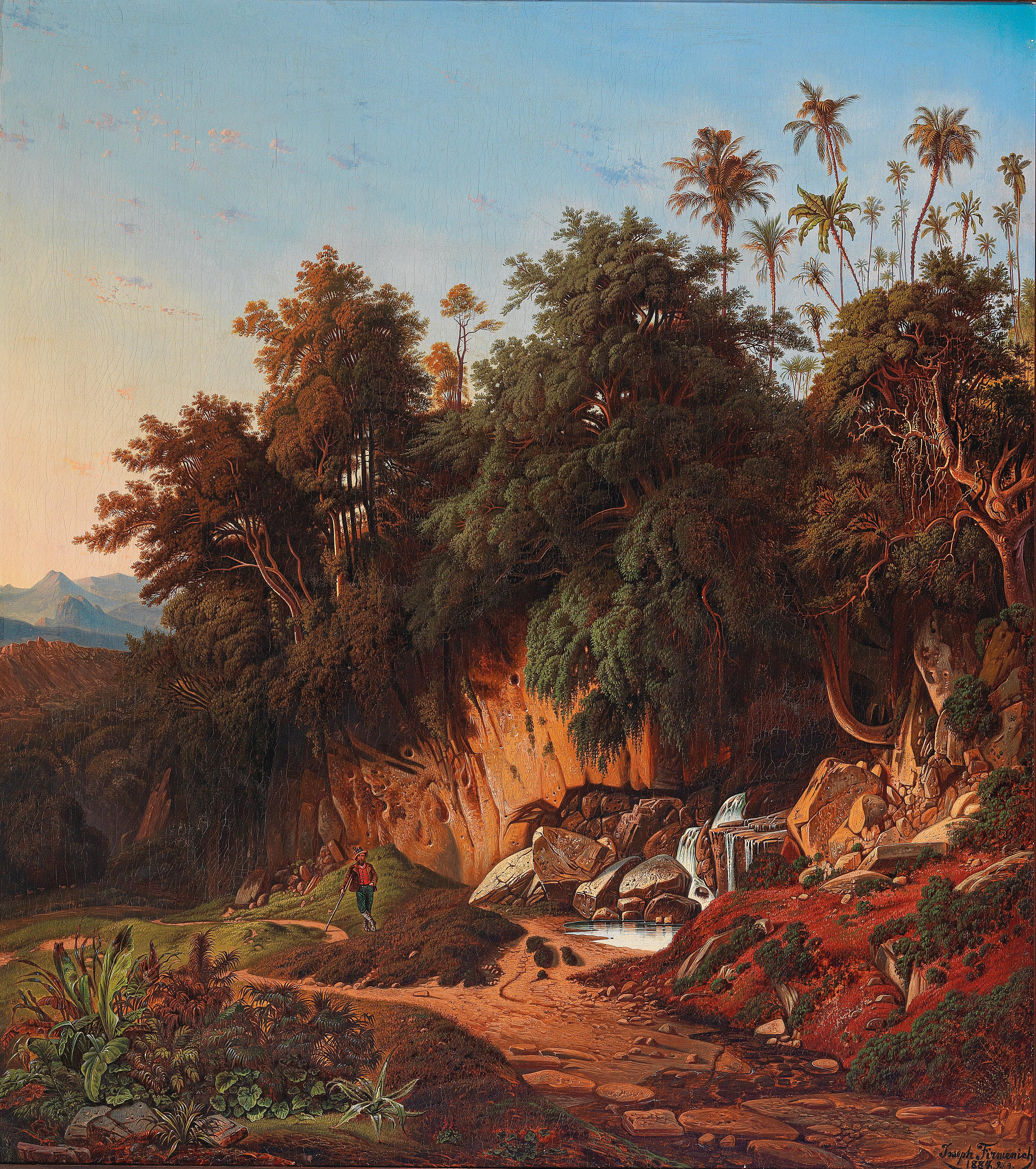
Quelle der heiligen Rosalia Palermo (1884)
