= Alfons Olszewski =

Polish sailor (1916–2006)

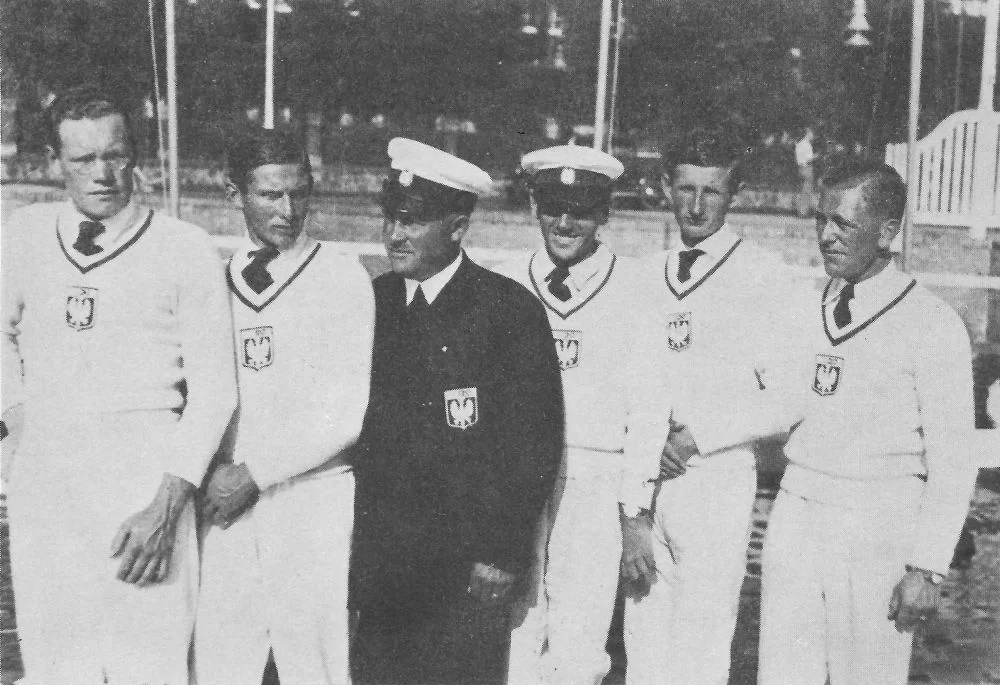
- The Polish mixed 6 metres sailing team in 1936. Olszewski is second from the left.

Personal information
- Nationality: Polish
- Born: 5 April 1916; Danzig, German Empire
- Died: 12 July 2006 (aged 90); Sopot, Poland

Alfons Olszewski (5 April 1916 – 12 July 2006) was a Polish sailor. He competed in the mixed 6 metres in the 1936 Summer Olympics.

During the Second World War, Olszewski was imprisoned by German forces in Stutthof concentration camp. After the war, he joined a yacht club in Gdynia.
