= Claude Desouches =

French sailor

Personal information
- Birth name: Claude Maxime Desouches
- Nationality: French
- Born: 15 February 1911; Paris, France
- Died: 11 February 2001 (aged 89); Paris, France

Claude Maxime Desouches (15 February 1911 – 11 February 2001) was a French sailor. He competed in the mixed 6 metres at the 1936 and 1948 Summer Olympics.
