= Ragnar Stenbäck =

Finnish sailor

Personal information
- Birth name: Ragnar A. Stenbäck
- Nationality: Finnish
- Born: 24 May 1908; Helsinki, Great Duchy of Finland
- Died: 15 June 1963 (aged 55); Helsinki, Finland

Ragnar A. Stenbäck (24 May 1908 – 15 June 1963) was a Finnish sailor. The son of Gunnar Stenbäck, he competed in the mixed 6 metres at the 1936 Summer Olympics.
