= Niels Schibbye =

Danish sailor

Personal information
- Nationality: Danish
- Born: 14 July 1910
- Died: 10 November 1989 (aged 79); Lugano, Switzerland

Sport
- Sport: Sailing

Niels Schibbye (14 July 1910 – 10 November 1989) was a Danish sailor. He competed in the 8 Metre event at the 1936 Summer Olympics.
