= Fritz Bischoff =

German sailor

Medal record

Men's sailing

Representing Germany

Olympic Games
Bronze medal – third place	1936 Berlin	8 Metre

Friedrich Nikolaus Bischoff (also known as Fritz Bischoff, born 6 December 1905, date of death unknown) was a German sailor who competed in the 1936 Summer Olympics.
