= Niels Wal Hansen =

Danish sailor

Personal information
- Full name: Niels Waldemar Hansen
- Nationality: Denmark
- Born: 23 October 1892 Køge, Denmark
- Died: 10 October 1972 (aged 79) Vedbæk, Denmark

Sailing career
- Sport: Sailing
- Club: Royal Danish Yacht Club
- Class: 8 Metre

Niels Waldemar Hansen (23 October 1892 – 10 October 1972) was a Danish sailor. He competed in the 8 Metre event at the 1936 Summer Olympics.
