= William Keane (sailor) =

American sailor

Personal information
- Born: January 4, 1899; Pittsburgh, Pennsylvania, United States
- Died: June 15, 1949 (aged 50); Gardner Canal, British Columbia, Canada

Sport
- Sport: Sailing

William Keane (January 4, 1899 – June 15, 1949) was an American sailor. He competed in the 8 Metre event at the 1936 Summer Olympics.
