= Oscar Sumelius =

Finnish sailor

Personal information
- Nationality: Finnish
- Born: 26 April 1894; Tampere, Finland
- Died: 7 August 1959 (aged 65); Helsinki, Finland

Sport
- Sport: Sailing

Oscar Sumelius (26 April 1894 – 7 August 1959) was a Finnish sailor. He competed in the 8 Metre event at the 1936 Summer Olympics.
