= Jacques Rambaud =

French sailor

Personal information
- Birth name: Jacques Alfred Ange Joseph Rambaud
- Nationality: French
- Born: 25 April 1906; Évreux, France
- Died: 14 September 2006 (aged 100); Fribourg, Switzerland

Jacques Rambaud (25 April 1906 – 14 September 2006) was a French sailor. He competed in the mixed 6 metres at the 1936 Summer Olympics.
