= Rémi Schelcher =

French sailor

Personal information
- Nationality: French
- Born: 8 August 1905; Paris, France
- Died: 20 April 1988 (aged 82); Évecquemont, France

Sport
- Sport: Sailing

Rémi Schelcher (8 August 1905 – 20 April 1988) was a French sailor. He competed in the 8 Metre event at the 1936 Summer Olympics.
