= Hans Struksnæs =

Norwegian sailor

Personal information
- Full name: Hans Sølberg Struksnæs
- Born: 24 April 1902 Hov, Søndre Land, Norway
- Died: 25 April 1983 (aged 81) Oslo, Norway
Medal record
Sailing
Representing Norway
Olympic Games
Silver medal – second place	1936 Berlin	8 metre class

Hans Sølberg Struksnæs (24 April 1902 – 25 April 1983) was a Norwegian sailor who competed in the 1936 Summer Olympics.

In 1936 he won the silver medal as crew member of the Norwegian boat Silja in the 8 metre class event.
