= William Bartholomae Jr. =

American sailor

William Bartholomae
Personal information
- Birth name: William August Bartholomae, Jr.
- Nationality: American
- Born: January 23, 1893; Los Angeles, California
- Died: January 5, 1964 (aged 70); Newport Beach, California

William August Bartholomae, Jr. (January 23, 1893 – January 5, 1964) was an American sailor and oil tycoon. He competed in the mixed 6 metres at the 1936 Summer Olympics. Bartholomae, the stepfather of fellow competitor Carl Paul, was stabbed to death by Manola Gallardo, the sister of his sister-in-law Mrs. Charles Bartholomae in 1964.
