= Charles Gaulthier =

French sailor

Personal information
- Nationality: French
- Born: 21 December 1889; Rennes, France
- Died: 17 March 1952 (aged 62)

Sport
- Sport: Sailing

Charles Gaulthier (21 December 1889 – 17 March 1952) was a French sailor. He competed in the 8 Metre event at the 1936 Summer Olympics.
