= Alexandre Gelbert =

Swiss sailor

Personal information
- Nationality: Swiss
- Born: 29 September 1910
- Died: 23 December 1988 (aged 78)

Sport
- Sport: Sailing

Alexandre Gelbert (29 September 1910 – 23 December 1988) was a Swiss sailor. He competed in the 6 Metre event at the 1936 Summer Olympics for the Swiss team. He and his team were disqualified, as a fellow competitor André Firmenich was determined to be a professional, in violation of the amateur-only Olympic rules at the time.

== Record ==
Competition	Event	Team	Position
1936 Summer Olympics	Sailing - 6 Metre	Switzerland	DQ
