= Carl Paul =

American sailor

Personal information
- Nationality: American
- Born: Carlton Hutton Paul Jr. August 17, 1917 Omaha, Nebraska
- Died: February 26, 1983 (aged 65) Palos Verdes, California

Sailing career
- Sport: Sailing

Carlton Hutton Paul Jr. (August 17, 1917 – February 26, 1983) was an American sailor and mechanical engineer. He competed in the mixed 6 metres at the 1936 Summer Olympics. He was the stepson of William Bartholomae Jr., a fellow competitor.
