= Gérard de Piolenc =

French sailor

Personal information
- Birth name: Gérard Marc Joseph Marie de Piolenc
- Nationality: French
- Born: 30 November 1908; Nazelles-Négron, France
- Died: 2 August 1979 (aged 70); West Haven, Connecticut, U.S.

Gérard Marc Joseph Marie de Piolenc (30 November 1908 – 2 August 1979) was a French sailor. He competed in the mixed 6 metres at the 1936 Summer Olympics.
