= Guillermo Peralta =

Argentine sailor

Personal information
- Born: 21 July 1908; Buenos Aires, Argentina
- Died: 23 September 1975 (aged 67); Buenos Aires, Argentina

Sport
- Sport: Sailing

Guillermo Peralta (21 July 1908 – 23 September 1975) was an Argentine sailor. He competed in the 8 Metre event at the 1936 Summer Olympics.
