= Renato Cosentino =

Italian sailor

Personal information
- Nationality: Italian
- Born: 16 November 1909; Naples, Italy
- Died: 14 June 1996 (aged 86); Naples, Italy

Renato Cosentino (16 November 1909 – 14 June 1996) was an Italian sailor. He competed in the mixed 6 metres at the 1936 and 1948 Summer Olympics.
