= Charles Garner (sailor) =

American sailor

Personal information
- Birth name: Charles Speed Garner
- Born: September 20, 1906; San Bernardino, California, U.S.
- Died: March 10, 1966 (aged 59); Los Angeles, California, U.S.

Charles Speed Garner (September 20, 1906 – March 10, 1966) was an American sailor. He competed in the mixed 6 metres at the 1936 Summer Olympics.
