= Miles Bellville =

British sailor (1909–1980)

Personal information
- Born: 28 April 1909
- Died: 27 October 1980 (aged 71)

Sailing career
- Sport: Sailing
Medal record
Sailing
Representing Great Britain
Gold medal – first place	1936 Berlin	6 metre class

Miles Aubrey Bellville (28 April 1909 – 27 October 1980) was a British sailor who competed in the 1936 Summer Olympics.

In 1936 he was a crew member of the British boat Lalage which won the gold medal in the six metre class.
