= Särklass A =

Sailing class

Development
- Year: 1935 (design rule)
- Design: Development class

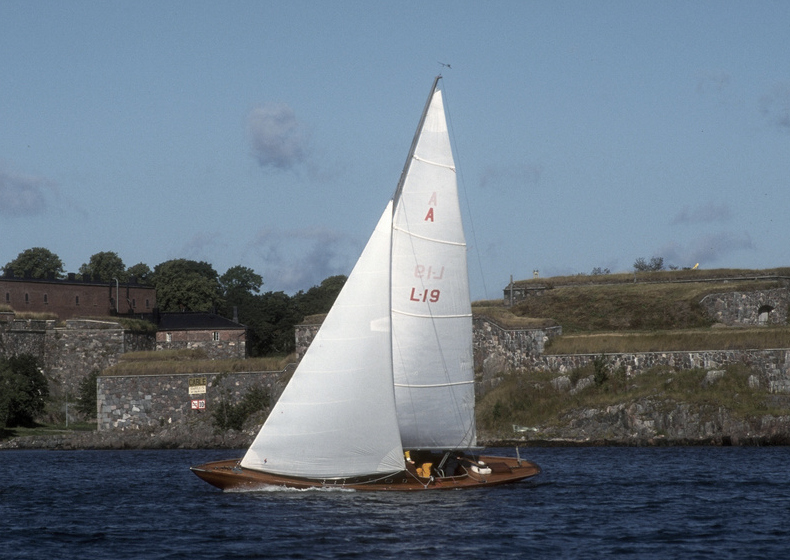
An example of a boat in Särklass A

Särklass A (Finnish: A-vene, lit. 'A-boat') is a sailing class in Finland with about 30 boats built between 1936 and 1952.

== See also ==
- Hai
- Särklass C
