= Domenico Mordini =

Italian sailor

Olympic medal record

Sailing
Gold medal – first place	1936 Berlin	8 metre class

Domenico Mordini (7 April 1898 – 12 March 1948) was an Italian sailor who competed in the 1936 Summer Olympics.

In 1936 he was a crew member of the Italian boat Italia which won the gold medal in the 8 metre class competition.
