= Vaadjuv Nyqvist =

Norwegian sailor

Olympic medal record

Sailing
| Silver medal – second place | 1936 Berlin | 6 metre class |

Vaadjuv Dag Nyqvist (October 5, 1902 – 9 May 1961) was a Norwegian sailor who competed in the 1936 Summer Olympics.

In 1936 he won the silver medal as crew member of the Norwegian boat Lully II in the 6 metre class event.
