= Nordahl Wallem =

Norwegian sailor

Personal information
- Full name: Nordahl Eriksen Wallem
- Born: 10 November 1902 Shanghai
- Died: 9 December 1972 (aged 70) Hong Kong
Medal record
Sailing
Representing Norway
Olympic Games
Silver medal – second place	1936 Berlin	8 metre class

Nordahl Eriksen Wallem (10 November 1902 – 9 December 1972) was a Norwegian sailor who competed in the 1936 Summer Olympics.

In 1936 he won the silver medal as crew member of the Norwegian boat Silja in the 8 metre class event.
