= Giuseppe Volpi (sailor) =

Italian sailor

Personal information
- Nationality: Italian
- Born: 13 May 1908 Nice, France

Sailing career
- Sport: Sailing

Giuseppe Volpi (born 13 May 1908, date of death unknown) was an Italian sailor. He competed in the mixed 6 metres at the 1936 Summer Olympics.
