= Luigi Poggi (sailor) =

Italian sailor

Medal record

Sailing

Representing Italy

Olympic Games
Gold medal – first place	1936 Berlin	8 metre class

Luigi Mino Poggi (11 March 1906 – 19 November 1962) was an Italian sailor who competed in the 1936 Summer Olympics and in the 1948 Summer Olympics. In 1936 he was a crew member of the Italian boat Italia which won the gold medal in the 8 metre class competition. In 1948 he finished eighth as a crew member of the Italian boat Ciocca II in the 6 metre class event.
