= Georges Firmenich =

Swiss sailor

Personal information
- Nationality: Swiss
- Born: 3 December 1913

Sport
- Sport: Sailing

Georges Firmenich (born 3 December 1913, date of death unknown) was a Swiss sailor. He competed in the 6 Metre event at the 1936 Summer Olympics.
