= Russell Harmer =

British sailor

Personal information
- Born: 5 November 1896
Died
31 October 1940 (aged 43)
Olympic medal record
Sailing
Gold medal – first place	1936 Berlin	6 metre class

Captain Russell Thomas Harmer (5 November 1896 – 31 October 1940) was a British sailor who competed in the 1936 Summer Olympics.

He was the son of Sidney Frederic Harmer, the British zoologist. He was educated at Uppingham School and the Royal Military Academy, Woolwich. In 1915 he joined the Royal Corps of Signals. During World War 1, he was wounded in action and reached the rank of Captain.

Post-war, he joined the family business selling wholesale clothing. In 1936 he was one of the four crew members of the British boat Lalage which won the gold medal in the 6 metre class. All four were members of the Royal Corinthian Yacht Club.

He died on 31 October 1940 in Norwich after a long illness.
