= Hans Howaldt =

German World War I U-boat commander

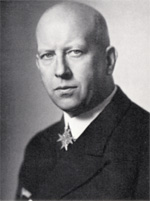
- Born: 12 November 1888; Kiel, German Empire
- Died: 6 September 1970 (aged 81); Bad Schwartau, West Germany
- Relatives: His grandfather August Howaldt was the builder of the first German submarine Brandtaucher.
- Military career
- Allegiance: German Empire; Nazi Germany
- Branch: Imperial German Navy; Kriegsmarine
- Service years: 1907–1918 and 1939–1945
- Rank: Kapitän zur See
- Units: Flandern Flottille, Zeebrugge, and in 1939 a unit of minelayers in the Baltic Sea, including Kattegat and Skagerrak
- Commands: UC-4, UB-40 and UB-107; Minelayer Hansestadt Danzig
- Conflicts: U-boat Campaign (World War I)
- Awards: Iron Cross; House Order of Hohenzollern; Pour le Mérite; Hanseatic Cross; War Merit Cross

Olympic medal record

Sailing
Bronze medal – third place	1936 Berlin	8 metre class

Hans Howaldt (12 November 1888, Kiel – 6 September 1970) was a successful and highly decorated German U-boat commander in the Kaiserliche Marine during World War I and also active in World War II. By the end of World War I he was promoted Kapitänleutnant.

As a sportsman, Hans Howaldt won Bronze in the international 8 Metre class sailing at the 1936 Summer Olympics on the Bay of Kiel as skipper of Germania III, a keelboat designed and built by Abeking & Rasmussen and owned by crew-member Alfried Krupp von Bohlen und Halbach.

== Awards and decorations ==
- Iron Cross of 1914, 1st and 2nd class
- Hamburg and Lübeck Hanseatic Crosses
- Knight's Cross of the Royal House Order of Hohenzollern with Swords
- Order of the Crown, 4th class (Prussia)
- Pour le Mérite
