= Simon Meister =

German painter

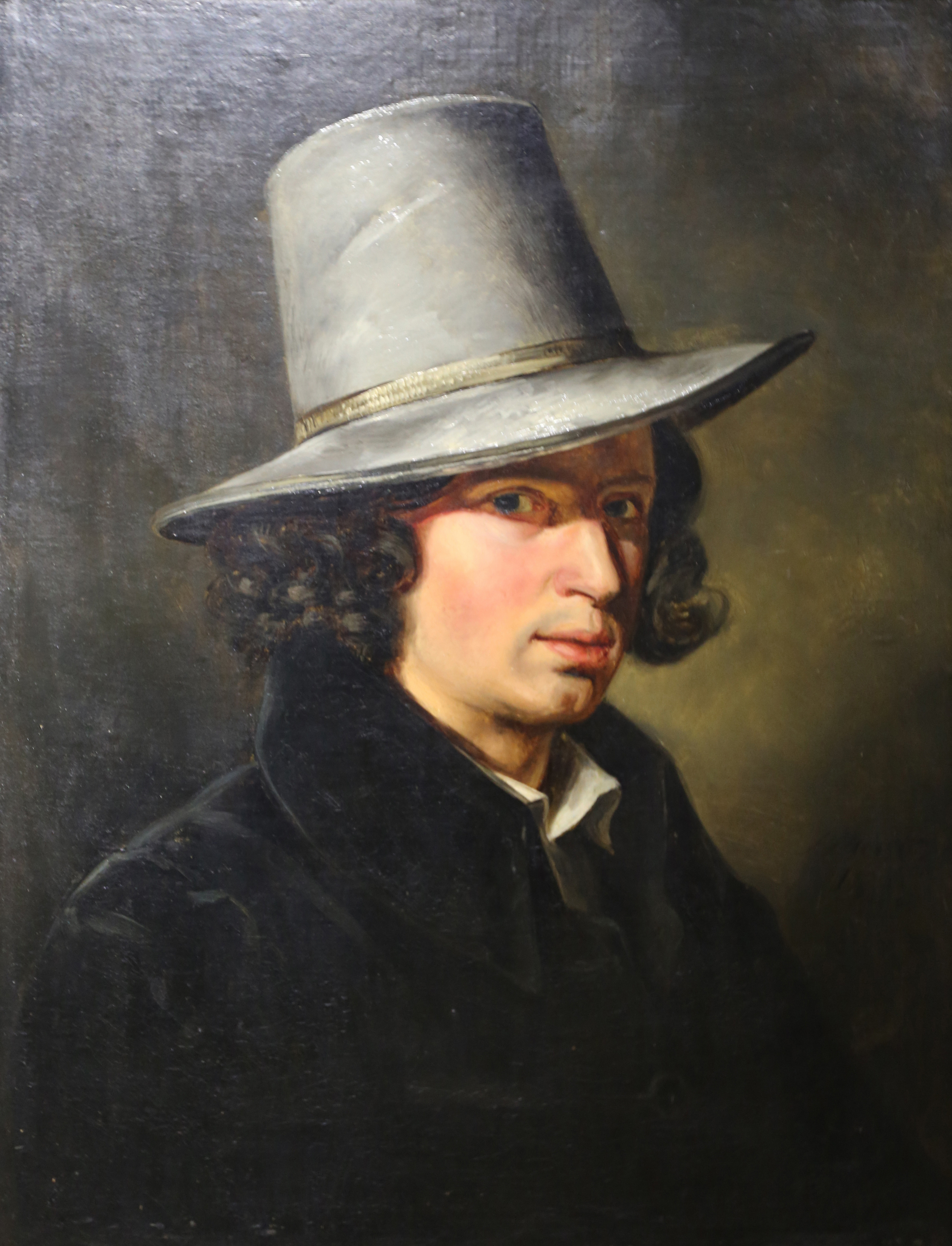
Self-portrait with hat (1832)

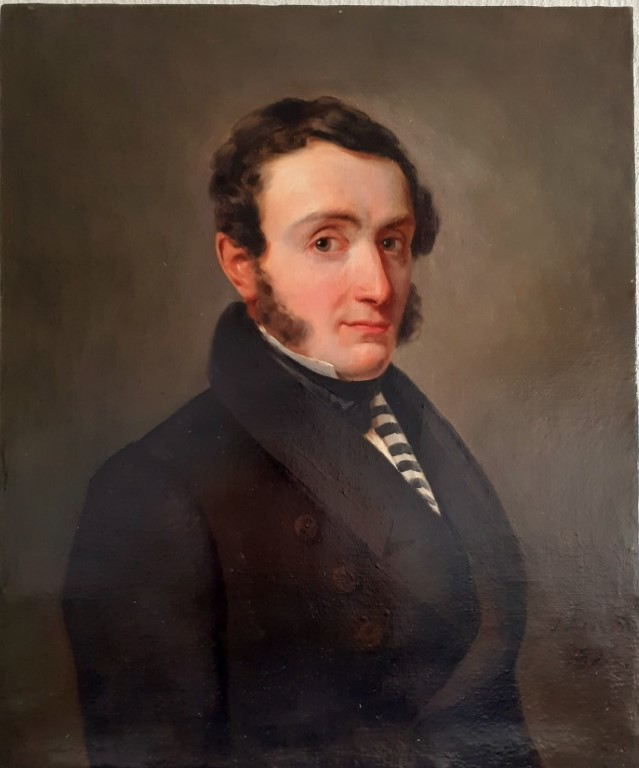
Anonyme, France (1825)

Simon Meister (20 December 1796 – 29 February 1844) was a German painter.

== Life ==
Meister was born in Koblenz in 1796 as the son of a saddler. He possibly learned his father's trade and received his first private drawing lessons in his home town before going to Paris. There he studied painting with Horace Vernet. After a scholarship from Frederick William III of Prussia expired, Meister returned to Koblenz in 1828, where he married.

During these years he mainly painted portraits of Koblenz citizens. Meister's attempts to obtain commissions from the Prussian king were only partially successful, despite support from Alexander von Humboldt, and his efforts to obtain a position at an academy failed.

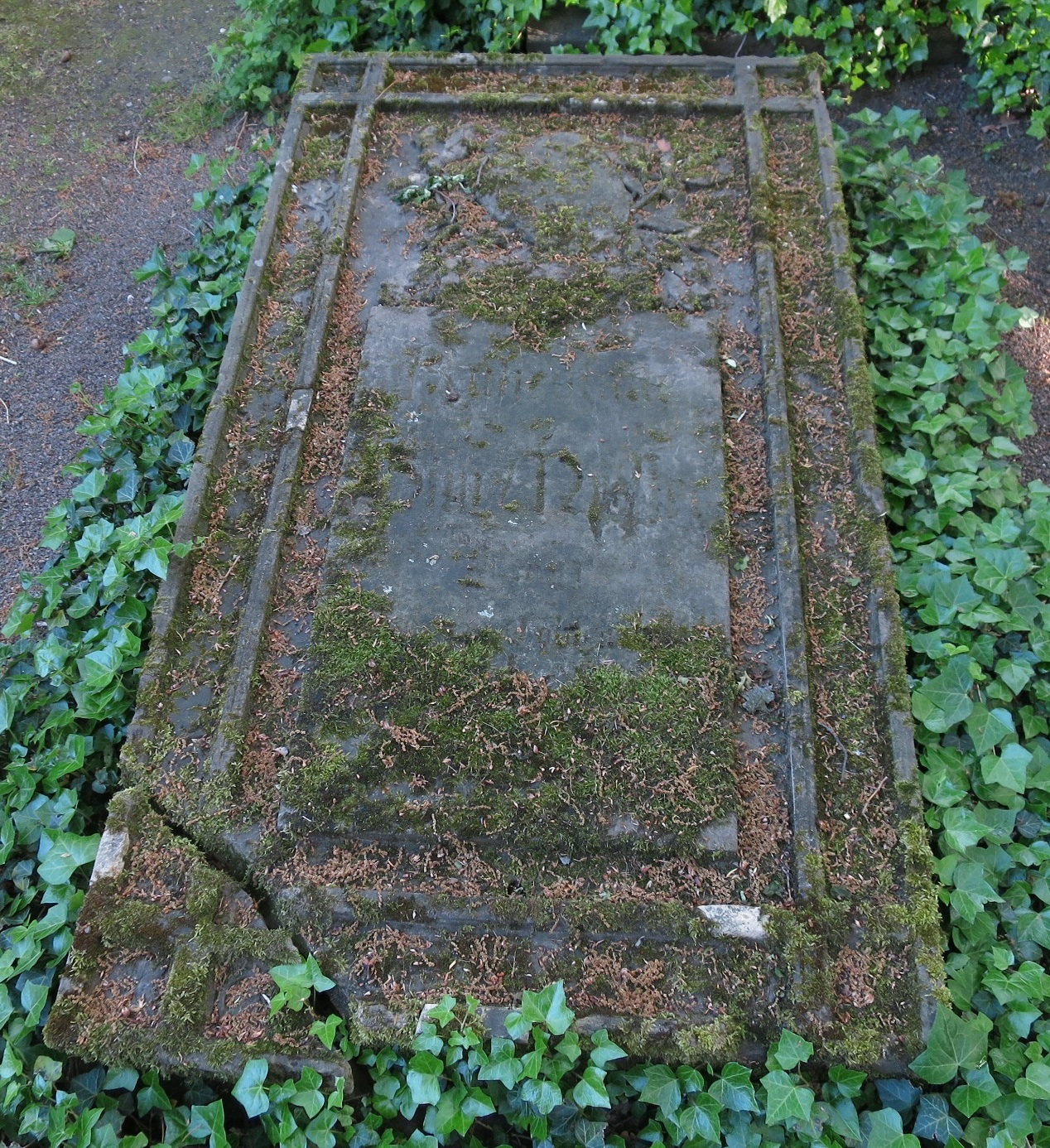
Grave slab at Cologne's Melaten cemetery

Around 1833, he moved with his family to Cologne, where he died in 1844 at the age of 47. Contemporaries suggested that he had a drinking problem in the last years of his life. In the obituary for him, "abdominal inflammation" is given as the cause of death.

Meister's subjects were portraits, battle scenes and animal fights. Religious themes apparently played no significant role in his work, but his depictions of the Cologne Carnival are significant in terms of cultural history. A commercial enterprise was the panoramas painted together with his brother showing the passage of French troops across the Rhine in 1797, which was accessible in Cologne for an entrance fee. It was supposedly later taken to Paris, but this did not happen due to Meister's death. Many of Meister's paintings were also reproduced as lithographs. He is considered one of the most important Rhenish painters of the Biedermeier period.

His gravesite is at the Melaten Cemetery in Cologne. (Lit. J, zwischen Lit.A+B).

== Family ==
Simon Meister's half-brother Nikolas Meiste and his son Ernst Meister were also painters.

== Work (selection) ==
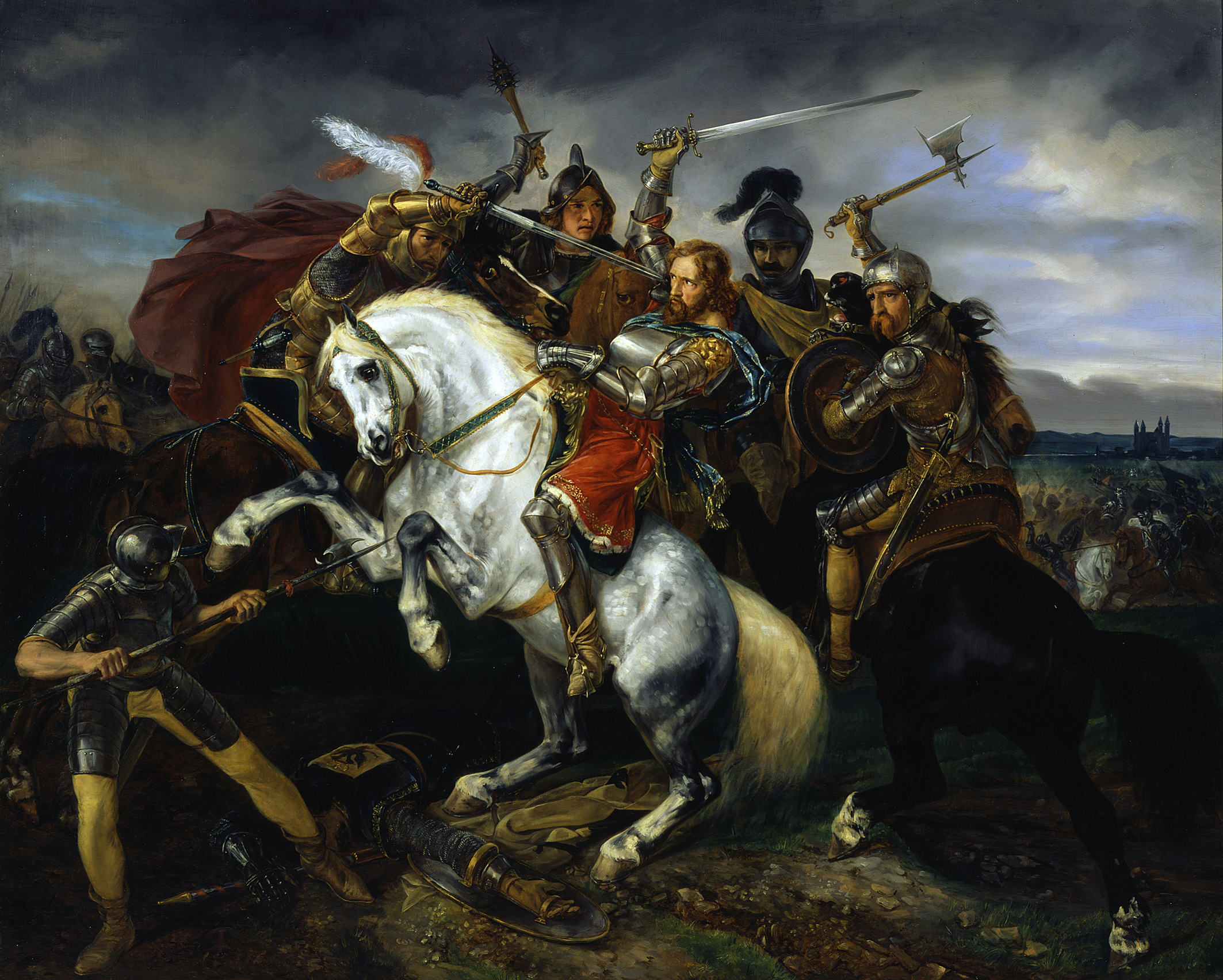
Death of Adolf of Nassau at the Battle of Göllheim, 1829

- Equestrian portrait from Napoleon Bonaparte, 1826.
- Self-portrait from 1827 in the Wallraf-Richartz-Museum & Fondation Corboud
- Portrait of Carl Friedrich Wolf Feuerstein (1828).
- Death of Adolf von Nassau at the Battle of Göllheim, 1829
- Die Familie Tillmann, 1832.
- Napoleon zu Pferde, 1832, Stadtmuseum Simeonstift Trier
- Self-portrait with his brother Nikolaus, (1833–1834)
- Rosenmontagszug auf dem Neumarkt, 1836
- Portrait of the perfume manufacturer Johann Baptist Farina, 1837
- Portrait of the composer Ludwig Spohr
- Der Rheinübergang der Franzosen bei Neuwied (1797) aus dem Jahr 1841 (with Nikolas Meister)
- The Battle of Kulm
- Die Ansicht der Schloss Stolzenfels bei Sonnenuntergang
- Das Reiterbildniß des Kronprinzen von Preußen, wie er 1834 in Begleitung zweier Generäle von einer in der Nähe von Köln abgehaltenen Parade zurückkehrt
- Löwenkampf.
- Portrait of the architect Johann Claudius von Lassaulx

== History of impact ==
From Franz Kellerhoven comes a lithograph after the self-portrait of the painter Simon Meister.

Meister's pupils included Wilhelm Kleinenbroich.

The writer Otto Brües adapted Meister's life story in the novel Simon im Glück, published in 1949.
