= Johann Jakob Merlo =

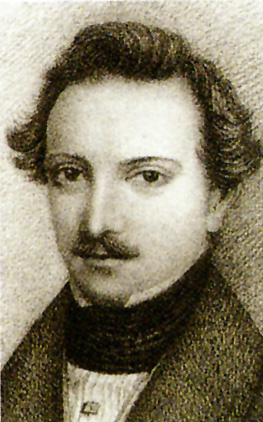
Merlo, circa 1830.

Johann Jakob Merlo (25 October 1810 – 27 October 1890) was a German historian, antiquarian and poet.
