= Morgan Adams (sailor) =

American sailor

Personal information
- Nationality: American
- Born: Morgan O. Adams Jr. August 30, 1915 Pasadena, California, United States
- Died: March 24, 2004 (aged 88) Los Angeles, California, United States

Morgan Orlando Adams Jr. (August 30, 1915 – March 24, 2004) was an American sailor. He competed in the 6 metre event at the 1936 Summer Olympics.
