= Felix Scheder-Bieschin =

German sailor

Olympic medal record

Sailing
Bronze medal – third place	1936 Berlin	8 metre class

Felix Scheder-Bieschin (22 October 1899 – 2 September 1940) was a German sailor who competed in the 1936 Summer Olympics.

During World War II he served in Kriegsmarine as a Korvettenkapitan and was killed in action off the coast of Norway.

In 1936 he won the bronze medal as crew member of the German boat Germania III in the 8 metre class event.
