= Enrico Poggi =

Italian sailor

Olympic medal record

Sailing

Representing Italy
Gold medal – first place	1936 Berlin	8 metre class

Enrico Massimo Poggi (January 30, 1908 – October 16, 1976) was an Italian sailor who competed in the 1936 Summer Olympics, in the 1948 Summer Olympics, and in the 1952 Summer Olympics. He was born and died in Genoa.

In 1936, he was a crew member of the Italian boat Italia which won the gold medal in the 8-metre class competition. In 1948, he finished eighth as a crew member of the Italian boat Ciocca II in the 6-metre class event. Four years later he was again a crew member of the Italian boat Ciocca II, which finished again eighth in the 6-metre class event.
