= Lennart Ekdahl =

Swedish sailor

Olympic medal record

Sailing
Bronze medal – third place	1936 Berlin	6 metre class

Lennart Ekdahl (8 December 1912 – 15 September 2005) was a Swedish sailor who competed in the 1936 Summer Olympics.

In 1936 he was a crew member of the Swedish boat May Be which won the bronze medal in the 6 metre class.
