= Bruno Bianchi (sailor) =

Italian sailor (1904–1988)

Olympic medal record

Sailing
Gold medal – first place	1936 Berlin	8 metre class

Bruno Bianchi (2 May 1904 – 22 August 1988) was an Italian sailor who competed in the 1936 Summer Olympics and in the 1948 Summer Olympics.

In 1936, he was a crew member of the Italian boat Italia which won the gold medal in the 8 metre class competition.

In 1948, he finished fifth as a crew member of the Italian boat Ausonia in the Dragon.
