= Daniel Oberti =

Daniel Oberti (1945–2009) was an American artist, sculptor, teacher, lecturer, mentor and creative community activist.

Born in San Francisco, California, Oberti lived and worked there until 1978, when he moved to Sonoma County in order to devote his life to art and ceramics.

Oberti’s best-known local sculpture, titled Guardian of the Creek, popularly known as The Fish, is located at Gateway Park, near the entrance to the Prince Memorial Greenway on Santa Rosa Avenue. The Fish is a 13-foot-tall, mosaic-covered statue of a rainbow trout was designed by Mario Uribe and created by Oberti and students in Santa Rosa’s Artstart program for artists in training.

During his long career at Artstart, Oberti also created two prominently placed concrete-and-brass sculptures: Three Spheres, at the Hyatt Vineyard Creek Hotel on the Prince Memorial Greenway, and Shadow Catcher, Wells Fargo Center for the Arts in Santa Rosa.

One of Oberti's largest projects titled Star Dancers was a collaboration with astronomer Maria Sundin of Gothenburg, Sweden. In this project Oberti created works based on Sundin's discoveries of the intricate and fascinating orbits of certain stars in barred galaxies. Oberti sketched newly discovered star patterns in clay, which served as a canvas to interpret Sundin's simulations in an artistic and sculptural format. The work presented cutting edge discoveries of star paths within the scope of a most ancient art form - that of potterymaking and sculpture. According to Sundin, "The Star Dancers project is a provocative enhancement of our collaboration... For [me], this [was] an entirely new way to reach a wider audience with [my] new research results. For Oberti, [it was] an expansive and creative explosion of new works which pay homage to astronomical themes from the archaic to the contemporary."

Oberti's outdoor artworks can be seen throughout the Bay Area in Healdsburg, Penngrove, Rohnert Park and Mendocino. Oberti’s international work includes the Venus sphere created for the world’s largest scale model of the Solar System, in Stockholm, Sweden, and sculptures in Onsala, Sweden and Palermo, Italy.

Oberti died peacefully at the age of 64 from cancer on May 2, 2009 at his home in Sebastopol.

"The sphere is the most perfect, the most capricious of figures, wherein neither beginning nor end can be found." - Copernicus.
