= Otto Wachs =

German sailer

Olympic medal record

Men's Sailing

Representing Germany
Bronze medal – third place	1936 Berlin	8 Metre

Otto Wachs (23 July 1909 – 30 December 1998) was a German sailor who competed in the 1936 Summer Olympics. In his later career he was Chairman of HAPAG shipping company at Hamburg and from 1961 to 1966 merchant banker (Berliner Handels-Gesellschaft).
