= Karsten Konow =

Norwegian sailor

Olympic medal record

Sailing
| Silver medal – second place | 1936 Berlin | 6 metre class |

Karsten Magnus Konow (16 February 1918 – 10 July 1945 in Stavanger) was a Norwegian sailor who competed in the 1936 Summer Olympics.

In 1936 he won the silver medal as crew member of the Norwegian boat Lully II in the 6 metre class event. His father Magnus Konow was captain.
