= Eduard Mohr =

German sailor

Olympic medal record

Men's Sailing

Representing Germany
Bronze medal – third place	1936 Berlin	8 Metre

Eduard Mohr (29 June 1902 – 20 September 1984) was a German sailor who competed in the 1936 Summer Olympics.
