= Särklass C =

Sailing class

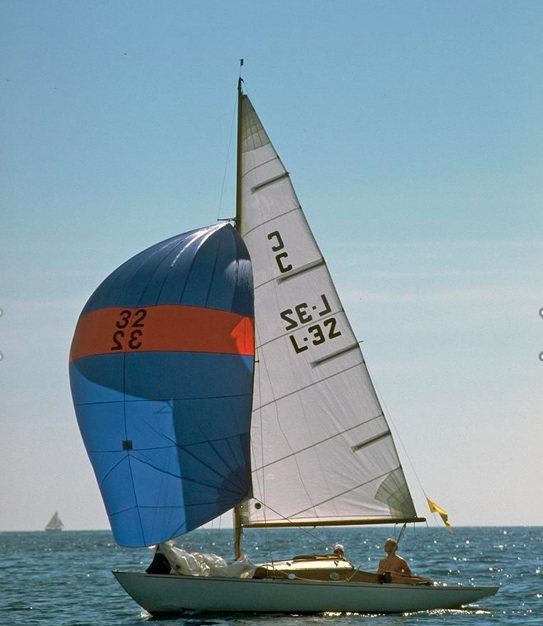
- Särklass C-boat

Development
- Design: Development class

Särklass C (Finnish: C-vene, lit. 'C-boat') is a sailing class with about 30 boats built between 1937 and 1956.

== See also ==
- Hai
- Särklass A
