= Frédéric Firmenich =

Swiss sailor

Personal information
- Nationality: Swiss
- Born: 23 December 1874; Geneva, Switzerland
- Died: 5 January 1953 (aged 78); Geneva, Switzerland

Sport
- Sport: Sailing

Frédéric Firmenich (23 December 1874 – 5 January 1953) was a Swiss sailor. He competed in the 6 Metre event at the 1936 Summer Olympics.
