= André Firmenich =

Swiss sailor

Personal information
- Nationality: Swiss
- Born: 26 March 1905; Geneva, Switzerland
- Died: 21 June 1965 (aged 60); Geneva, Switzerland

Sport
- Sport: Sailing

André Firmenich (26 March 1905 – 21 June 1965) was a Swiss sailor. He competed at the 1936 Summer Olympics, the 1948 Summer Olympics and the 1952 Summer Olympics. He was disqualified from the 1936 Games for being a professional athlete, disallowed by the International Olympic Committee at the time.

== Record ==
Competition	Event	Team	Position
1936 Summer Olympics	Sailing - 6 Metre	Switzerland	DQ
1948 Summer Olympics	Sailing - 6 Metre	Switzerland	7th
1952 Summer Olympics	Sailing - 6 Metre	Switzerland	6th
