= Massimo Oberti =

Italian sailor

Personal information
- Nationality: Italian
- Born: 22 June 1901; Genoa, Kingdom of Italy
- Died: 6 January 1972 (aged 70); Genoa, Italy

Massimo Oberti (22 June 1901 – 6 January 1972) was an Italian sailor. He competed at the mixed 6 metres at the 1928 and 1936 Summer Olympics, as well as the mixed 5.5. metres at the 1956 Summer Olympics. His twin brother was Giuliano Oberti.
