= Giovanni Reggio =

Italian sailor

Personal information
- Full name: Giovanni Leone Raffaele Valerico Reggio
- Nationality: Italian
- Born: 12 December 1888 Genoa
- Died: 22 December 1971 (aged 83) Genoa

Sailing career
- Sport: Sailing
- Club: Lega Italiana Navale Genova
- Class: 6 Metre
Competition record
Sailing
Representing Italy
Olympic Games
10th	1928 Amsterdam	6 Metre
- Updated on 18 March 2015

Giovanni Leone Reggio (12 December 1888 – 22 December 1971) was an Italian sailor who competed in the 1928 Summer Olympics, 1936 Summer Olympics, and 1948 Summer Olympics. In 1928 he finished seventh as a crew member of the Italian boat Twins II in the 6 metre class event. Eight years later he was a crew member of the Italian boat Italia which won the gold medal in the 8 metre class competition. In 1948 he finished eighth as a crew member of the Italian boat Ciocca II in the 6 metre class event.
