= Giuliano Oberti =

Italian sailor

Personal information
- Nationality: Italian
- Born: 22 June 1901; Genoa, Kingdom of Italy

Giuliano Oberti (born 22 June 1901) was an Italian sailor. He competed at the mixed 6 metres at the 1928 and 1936 Summer Olympics. His twin brother was Massimo Oberti.
