= 12 Metre =

International racing sailing class

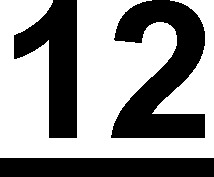
- Class symbol

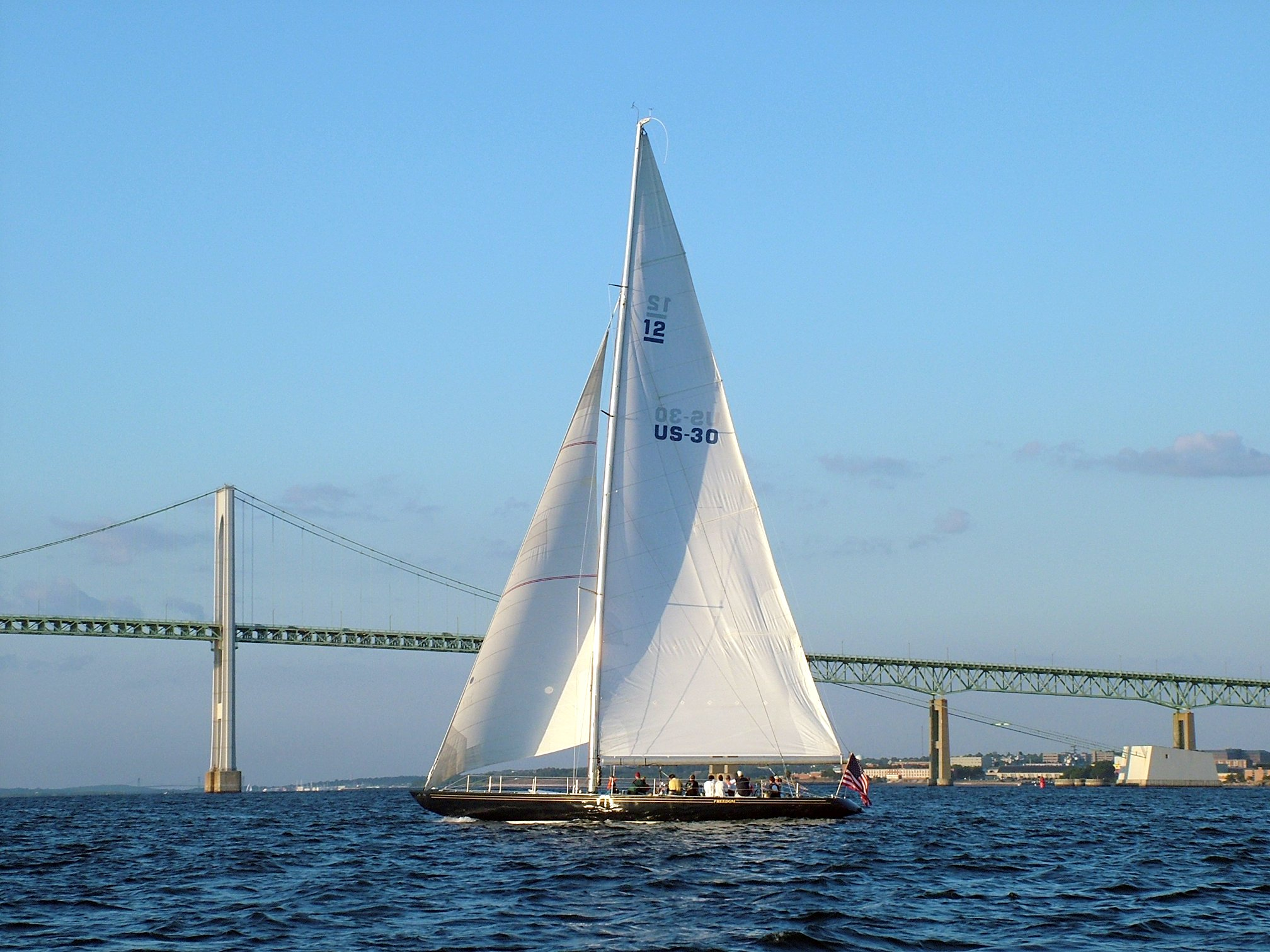
- The 12 Metre yacht Freedom, third rating rule

Development
- Year: 1907 (rule design)
- Design: Development class

The 12 Metre class is a rating class for racing sailboats that are designed to the International rule. It enables fair competition between boats that rate in the class whilst retaining the freedom to experiment with the details of their designs. The designation "12 Metre" does not refer to any single measurement on the boat, and is not referencing the vessels overall length, rather, measures the sum of the components directed by the formula which governs design and construction parameters. Typically 12 Metre class boats range from 65 to 75 feet (about 20 to 23 m) in length overall; they are most often sloop-rigged, with masts roughly 85 feet (26 m) tall.

The first 12 Metres were built in 1907. The 12 Metre class was used in the Olympic Games of 1908, 1912 and 1920 but few boats participated in these events. The 12 Metre class boats are best known as the boat design used in the America's Cup from 1958 to 1987.

Competitiveness between boats in the class is maintained by requiring the boats to be in compliance with the 12 Metre formula. Designers and builders are required to take into account such things as the sail area, the boat length at the waterline and the boat girth (the measurement around the boat from one sideboard, under the keel, and then over the top on the opposite side back to the original side). The measurements are then weighted in the formula. For example, the present formula takes the square root of the sail area rather than total area. The combination of weighted measurements must be less than or equal to 12 metres. Designers are free to change any of the component variables, as well as other details, such as the size of the rudder and keel, so long as the corresponding changes elsewhere produce an ultimate sum of 12 metres and the resulting boat is both seaworthy and safe. Though disparity between boats are minimized by the rule, enough variation exists so that races are as much about design and construction as they are about seamanship and tactics.

== History ==
=== The formula and rules ===
The Formula and associated rules for designing and constructing 12 Metre yachts has been modified several times from inception in racing.

The purpose of the Formula and rules was to encourage designer's creativity to optimize designs to get the best overall performance when racing while still maintaining competitive racing postures between different designs. Although the Formula and Rules allowed for some creativity they were also intended to be comprehensive enough to eliminate loop holes which could result in an extreme design which conformed to the 12 Metre rule but completely outclassed other contemporary designs on the race course. If the rules were considered to be too loose then it would discourage the building of new 12 Metre yachts for fear of a new boat being outclassed even before it was launched.

The Rules were typically updated in response to advances in areas such as material technology (e.g. metal masts versus wooden masts), design technology (e.g. use of the wind tunnel to design sails and sail/mast combinations, advances in fluid dynamics), and equipment (e.g. winch technology).

The Rule has four distinct periods:

==== First rating rule ====
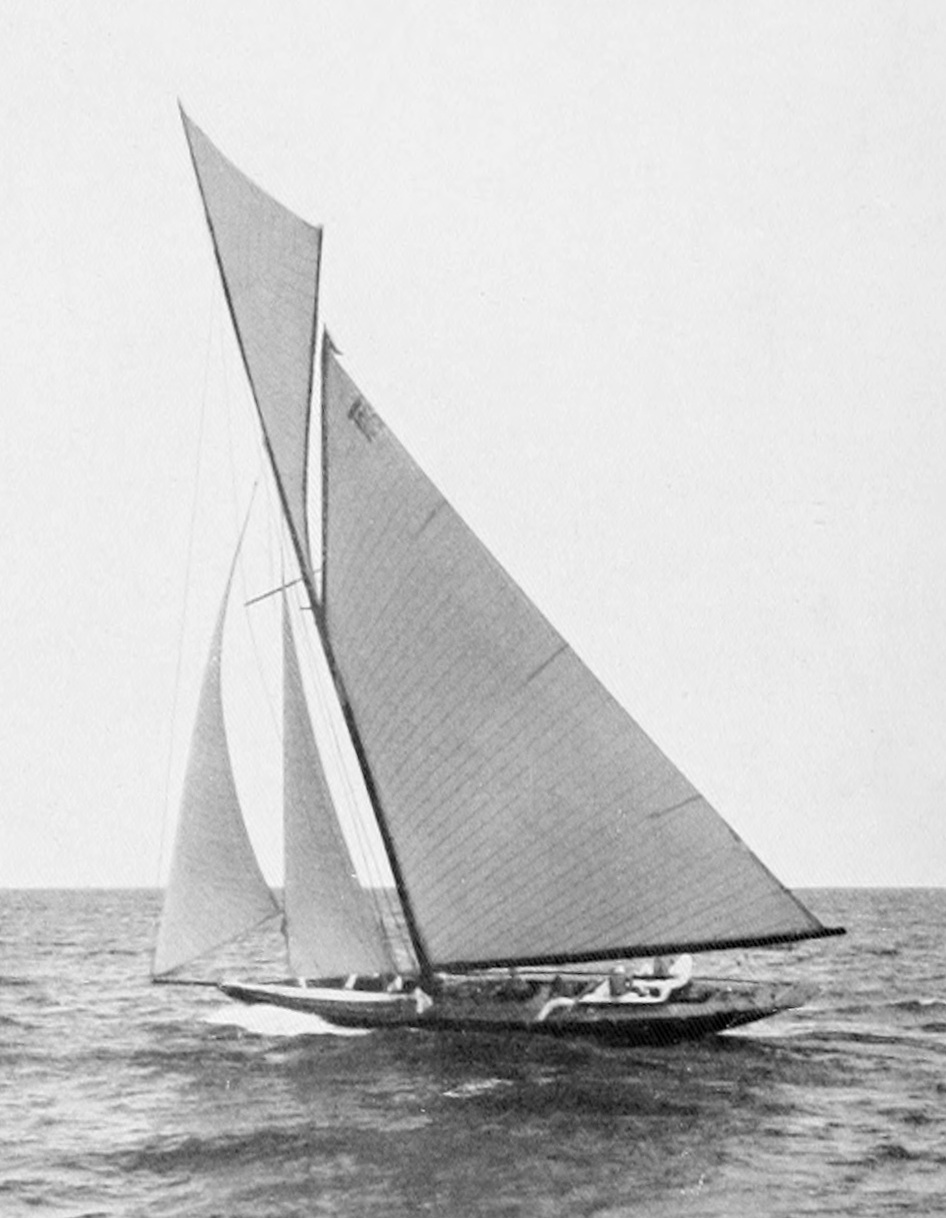
Swedish Erna Signe won silver at the 1912 Summer Olympics in 12 Metre class (1907 rule boat).

Used from 1907 to 1920

$$\frac{L + B + G/3 +3d + \sqrt{S}/3 - F}{2} \leq 12 \mbox{ metres}$$

where

- $L$ = waterline length (LWL)
- $B$ = beam
- $G$ = chain girth
- $d$ = difference between skin girth and chain girth
- $S$ = sail area
- $F$ = freeboard

==== Second rating rule ====
Used from 1920 to 1933.

$$\frac{L + G/4 +2d + \sqrt{S} - F}{2.5} \leq 12 \mbox{ metres}$$

where

- $L$ = waterline length (LWL)
- $G$ = chain girth
- $d$ = difference between skin girth and chain girth
- $S$ = sail area
- $F$ = freeboard

==== Third rating rule, and, from 1956, the America's Cup rule ====
Used from 1933 onwards:

$$\frac{L + 2d + \sqrt{S} - F}{2.37} \leq 12 \mbox{ metres}$$

where

- $L$ = waterline length (LWL)
- $d$ = difference between skin girth and chain girth
- $S$ = sail area
- $F$ = freeboard

Associated with the formula is an extremely comprehensive set of rules, which can be classified into two main areas: safety, and ensuring competitive racing. For example, the maximum total area of all cockpits is specified to minimise the chance of a boat being swamped in rougher seas. Structural requirements are specified to ensure that strength is not sacrificed by the need to get weight low down in the keel. Materials are specified plus numerous other details concerning all aspects of the boat. The intention is to challenge designers but ensure competitive racing.

=== America's Cup ===
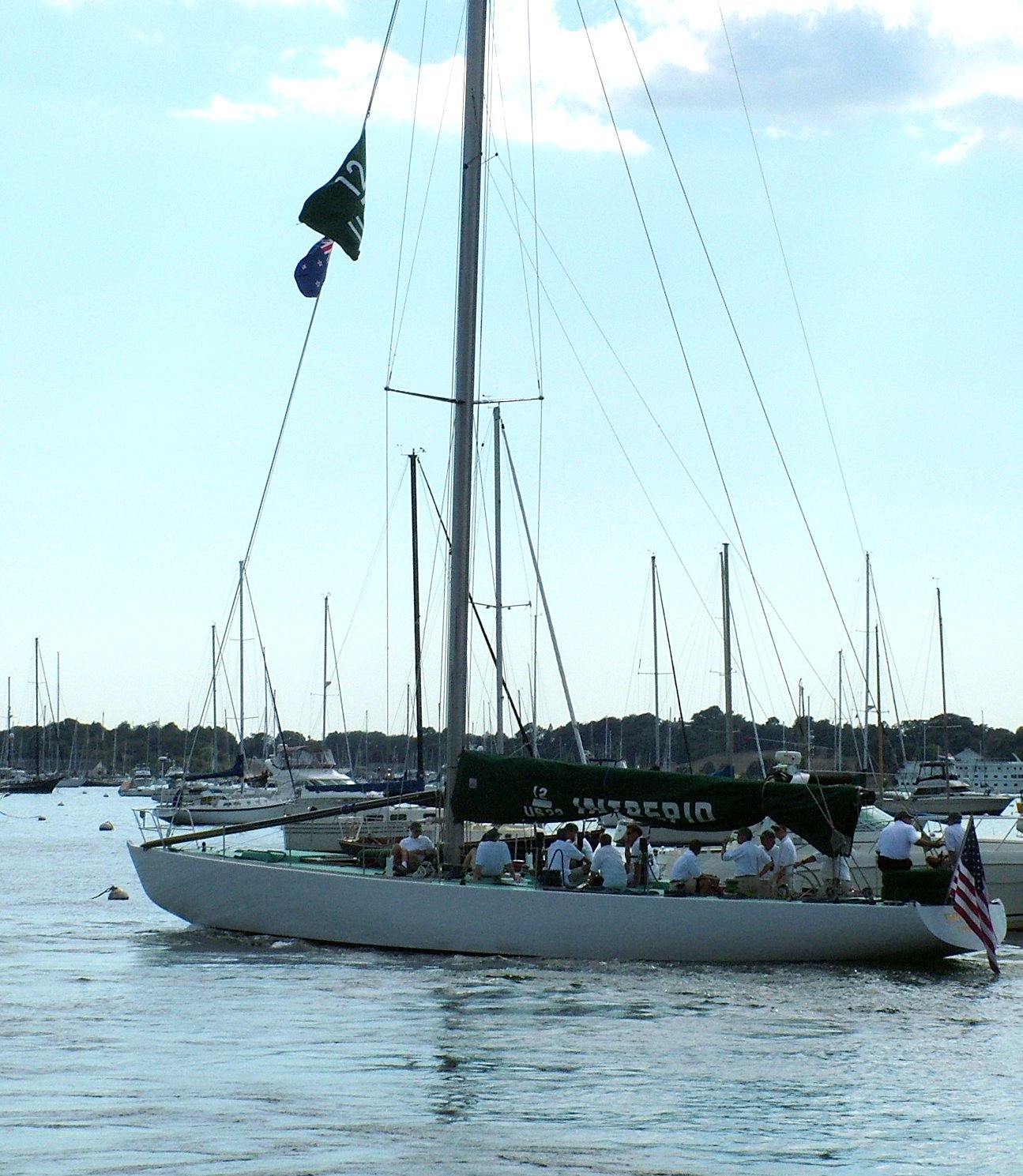
Two time America's Cup winner Intrepid

When the America's Cup racing resumed in 1958 after World War II by a syndicate led by Henry Sears, more economical vessels were desired to replace the huge and expensive J-class yachts that were raced in the 1930s; the 12 Metre class was selected.

In September 1956, a Royal Yacht Squadron syndicate was formed to build a 12 Metre for the 1958 America's Cup. The UK challenger was selected based on model tank testing and David Boyd's second design was chosen. Sceptre was launched at the yard of Alexander Robertson & Sons on 2 April 1958, but lost to the New York Yacht Club yacht Columbia in September 1958. Sceptre is currently owned and raced by the Sceptre Preservation Society. Alexander Robertson and Sons Ltd also built two of the earliest 12-Metres: Heatherbell (designer Thomas Glen-Coats, 1907), which represented Finland in the 1912 Summer Olympics; Cyra (designer Alfred Mylne, 1909).

In 1987, use of the 12 Metre class was ended, switching to International America's Cup Class boats for the 1992 competition.

=== Post-America's Cup ===
12 Metre yachts were used for the last time in America's Cup competition at the 1987 event held in Fremantle, Australia. 12 Metres continued to race together on a local basis but due to the high cost and without the impetus and prestige surrounding competition in the America's Cup, no new boats have been built since 1987 save one.

The latter part of the 20th century saw a big revival in interest in classic yachts including 12 Metre yachts and particularly those of wooden construction. There was an increasing number of prestigious regattas in attractive locations such as the Mediterranean and the Caribbean. Also, a more prosperous global economy prevailed and the result was an increasing number of restorations and racing of older 'classic' 12 Metres.

Potential restorers of older boats who wanted to race were potentially faced with a dilemma of whether to restore a boat to its original specification or make modifications to make an older design competitive with a newer design. For example, a yacht designed under the First International Rule would have a wooden mast, gaff rig, and sails made of cotton; whereas yachts designed under the Third International Rule, such as Vim, had a metal mast, Bermuda rig, and sails made from Dacron.

To encourage participation in racing and also engage the restoration process which remained true to the spirit of the original design, the 12 Metre class association introduced a handicapping system to allow 12 Metres of all ages to race together on a more equal footing. The basis is a handicap applied to each boat according to the 'era' of its design to encourage owners to restore older boats and participate in exciting and sociable racing.

A 12 Metre is classified as belonging to one of three periods. Each Period is defined as a range of dates which coincided with a particular type of keel or rudder design becoming widespread.

- Division A:- Also called Grand Prix, this subclass starts when winged keels became the norm. It covers all 12 Metre yachts built with winged keels and all constructed after 1983. Australia II, launched in 1982, was the first wing keeled 12 Metre so is considered the first of this division. USA (US 61), also fits into this category, even though its keel structure is different from the standard winged keel of the class. It is also the only 12 Metre to have a "canard" or rudder mounted forward of the keel.
- Division B (Modern):- Starts when a skeg mounted rudder separated from the keel became the norm. It includes all 12 Metres built during the period 1968 - 1983. Intrepid is considered the first Modern even though it was built in 1967 since it was the first 12 Metre to use a skeg mounted rudder. It excludes Australia II, built in 1982, which is in Period A due to its winged keel design.
- Division C (Classic):- All other 12 Metre class yachts built before 1968 but excluding Intrepid which is in Period B by virtue of its skeg mounted rudder design. Divisions D (Vintage) & E (Antique) are the remaining 2 Divisions based on the year of construction including Antique (most of which are in fact gaff rigged). Older sloop-rigged yachts like Vim and Onawa fit into the Vintage category, yachts like Erna Signe belong to the Antique division. In the early 21st century interest in ownership and restoration of 12 Metres was such that specialist restoration companies would speculatively locate old boats under threat of destruction and publicize the availability in order to attract the funding for a full restoration.

== Events ==
=== Olympics ===
Event	Gold	Silver	Bronze
1908 London	Great Britain (GBR); T. C. Glen-Coats (helmsman); J. H. Downes (mate); J. S. Aspin; John Buchanan; J. C. Bunten; A. D. Downes; David Dunlop; John Mackenzie; Albert Martin; Gerald Tait	Great Britain (GBR); C. MacIver (helmsman); J. G. Kenion (mate); J. M. Adam; James Baxter; W. P. Davidson; J. F. Jellico; T. A. R. Littledale; C. R. MacIver; C. Macleod Robertson; J. F. D. Spence	No further competition
1912 Stockholm	Norway (NOR); Johan Anker; Nils Bertelsen; Eilert Falch-Lund; Halfdan Hansen; Arnfinn Heje; Magnus Konow; Alfred Larsen; Petter Larsen; Christian Staib; Carl Thaulow	Sweden (SWE); Nils Persson; Per Bergman; Dick Bergström; Kurt Bergström; Hugo Clason; Folke Johnson; Sigurd Kander; Ivan Lamby; Erik Lindqvist; Hugo Sällström	Finland (FIN); Ernst Krogius; Ferdinand Alfthan; Pekka Hartvall; Jarl Hulldén; Sigurd Juslén; Eino Sandelin; Johan Silén
1920 Antwerp; 1907 rule	Norway (NOR); Henrik Østervold; Halvor Birkeland; Rasmus Birkeland; Lauritz Christiansen; Hans Naess; Halvor Mögster; Jan Østervold; Kristian Østervold; Ole Østervold	No further competitors	No further competitors
1920 Antwerp; 1919 rule	Norway (NOR); Johan Friele; Arthur Allers; Martin Borthen; Kaspar Hassel; Erik Ørvig; Olav Örvig; Thor Ørvig; Egill Reimers; Christen Wiese	No further competitors	No further competitors

=== World Championships ===
Year	Gold	Silver	Bronze
1979 Brighton	Lionheart (GBR)		
1982 Newport	Victory '82 (GBR); Phil Crebbin; Harold Cudmore	Clipper (CAN); Terry McLaughlin	
1984 Porto Cervo	Victory '83 (GBR)		
1986 Fremantle	Australia III (AUS)		
1987 Porto Cervo	Kiwi Magic (NZL)		
1988 Luleå	Kookaburra III (AUS); Peter Gilmour		
1991 San Diego	New Zealand (NZL)		
1999 St.-Tropez	Kiwi Magic (ITA)		
2001 Cowes	South Australia (AUS); Russell Coutts	New Zealand; Cameron Appleton	United States; John Edwin Bertrand; Cole Lissiman
2005 Newport	Hissar - KZ5 (USA) Edgar Cato	Wright on White - KZ3 (BRA) Lars Grael	Kiwi Magic (USA)
2007 Cannes	no champion decided		
2008 Flensburg	Nyala (ITA)	Trivia (GER)	Sphinx (GER)
2009 Newport	Kiwi Magic (USA)	Wright on White - KZ3 (BRA)	U.S.A. - US61 (USA)
2014 Barcelona	Nyala (ITA)	Trivia (GER)	Vanity V (DEN)
2019 Newport	Legacy - KZ5 (DEN) Challenge 12 (USA); Columbia (USA); Nyala (ITA)	New Zealand - KZ3 (USA) Enterprise (USA); American Eagle (USA); Onawa (USA)	Kookaburra II (ITA); Courageous (USA); Nefertiti (USA); Blue Marlin (FIN)
2021 Helsinki	Vim (DEN)	Blue Marlin (FIN)	Flica II (GER)

== Yachts ==
- Onawa (US 6) & Anitra (US 5) - The oldest American 12 Metre yachts still intact.
- Vim: Designed in 1939 by Olin Stephens who considered the possibilities given by every aspect of the rules and produced a very fast boat. Vim had numerous innovative features including a trim tab on the rudder, two-speed winches and a lighter mast made of Duralumin (a form of aluminium used in the aircraft industry). Vim is considered a benchmark design which was continually refined over her racing career. In 1939 Vim came to the UK and won 19 races out of 28. The next generations of 12 Metres designed and built 20 years after Vim was launched still found Vim extremely difficult to beat in competition.
- Sparkman & Stephens designed five successful America's Cup defenders for the NYYC. The first was Columbia, winner of the 1958 Cup, followed by Constellation in 1964. Intrepid won the 1967 and 1970 America's Cups. Courageous won in 1974 and 1977 (skippered by Ted Hood in 1974 and Ted Turner in 1977). The last of the S&S designed 12s to win the America's Cup was Freedom in 1980. Columbia Intrepid Courageous and Freedom are still sailing and racing today in Newport.
- Sceptre (K 17), the British challenger for the America's Cup in 1958, is believed to be the only UK challenger still sailing in British waters.
- Weatherly, designed by Philip Rhodes, successfully defended the America's Cup in 1962, and is also sailing and racing today in Newport.
- Australia II, Alan Bond's famous winged keel boat that won the 1983 America's Cup. The boat that ended the longest winning streak in sport. Designed by Ben Lexcen, Australia II was one of the first racing yachts to use appendages on the keel, which allowed the yacht to point higher, sail faster and be quicker in stays. The keel design also allowed a reduction in weight in the keel which then allowed other beneficial changes in the measured dimensions which resulted in a yacht optimized for the conditions on the race course at Newport, Rhode Island.
- New Zealand (KZ 7) "Kiwi Magic" Runner-up in 1987 Louis Vuitton Cup, and the third 12 Metre to be made from fibreglass. Sister yachts KZ-3 and KZ-5 did not compete at the 1987 America's Cup but took part in the 1986 World Championships in Perth. KZ-7 went on to win the 1988 World Championship in Sardinia. Nicknamed the "Plastic Fantastic". Skippered by Chris Dickson.
- Stars & Stripes 87 (US 55) Winner of the 1987 America's Cup. The fastest heavy weather 12 Metre boat ever built.

== See also ==
- Square Metre Rule (sailing)
- Ton class
