= Royal Swedish Yacht Club =

Yacht club in Sweden

Kungliga Svenska Segel Sällskapet
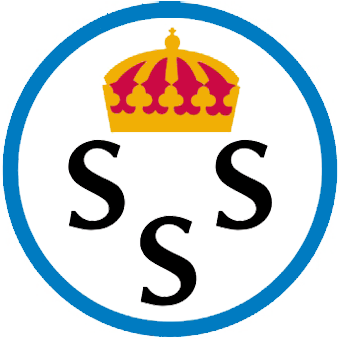
- Emblem

- Burgee
- Short name: KSSS
- Founded: 15 May 1830; 196 years ago
- Location: Hotellvägen 9, Saltsjöbaden, Stockholm status = active
- Commodore: Patrik Salén
- Website: http://www.ksss.se//

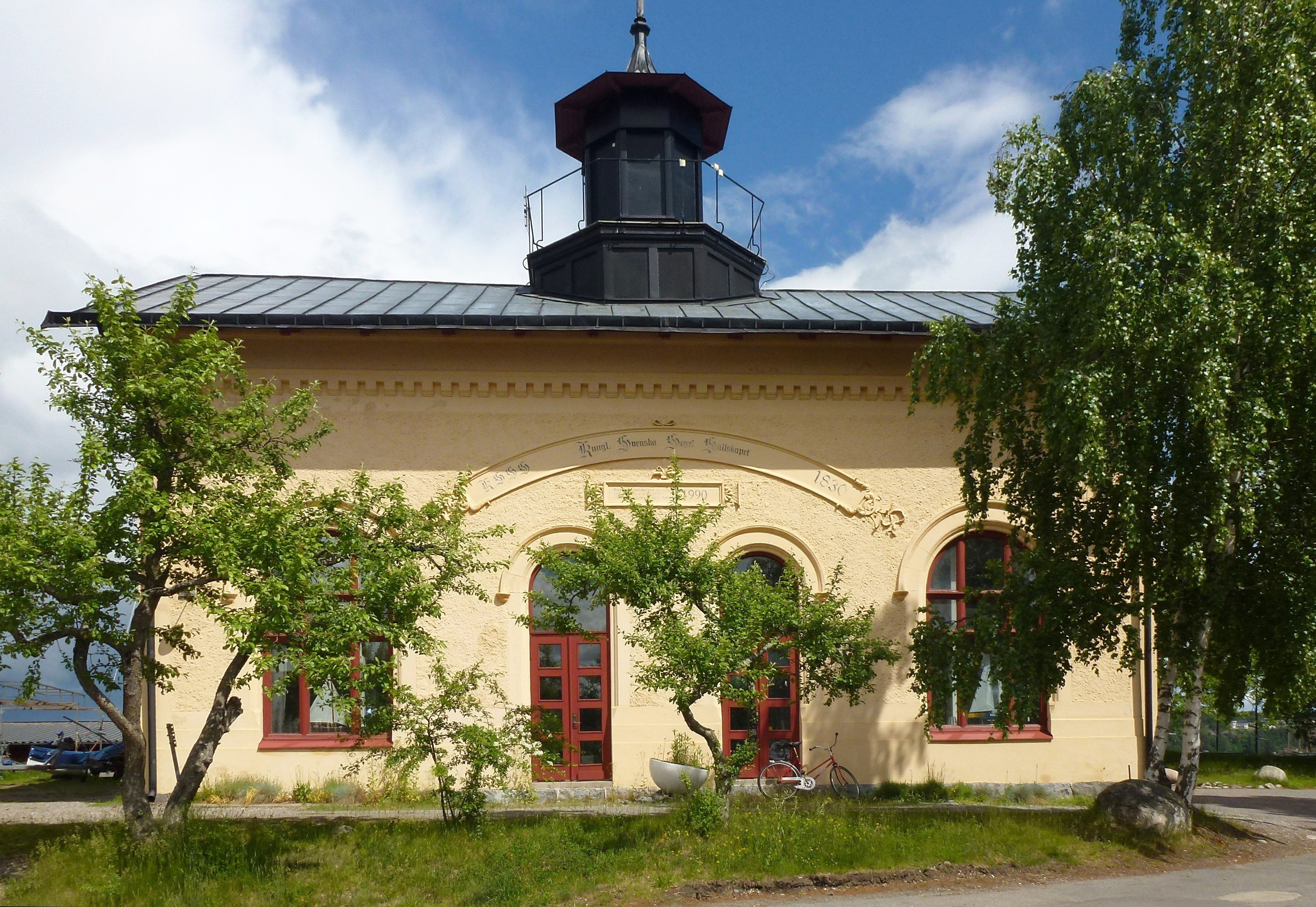
The Royal Swedish Yacht Club building in Saltsjöbaden

The Royal Swedish Yacht Club (Swedish: Kungliga Svenska Segelsällskapet, KSSS), is the largest and oldest yacht club in Sweden and one of the five oldest in the world, formed 15 May 1830. The Royal Swedish Yacht Club is also the oldest yacht club in Continental Europe.

Activities include racing, training, education, squadron sailing, match racing and club activities. The Royal Swedish Yacht Club also operates the port and has its own ports in Saltsjöbaden and Sandhamn. Every year the yacht club organizes the Round Gotland Race sailed around Gotland, and the Sandhamsregattan at Sandön, in the Stockholm archipelago.

== History ==
The Royal Swedish Yacht Club was founded on Skeppsholmen by O. Fresk, J. C. Fleming, C. F. Cimmerdahl, J. Falkenholm, G. E. Lundstedt, and P. A. Nordwall on 15 May 1830. In 1878, it received its royal title. The first regatta the club organised took place on 12 September 1833.

In the early 1850s Royal Swedish Yacht Club yachts Sverige and Aurora Borealis participated in races in England, and in 1854, the yacht club organised its first regatta with prizes. In 1895, Royal Swedish Yacht Club sailed together to Finland and participated in the Sinebrychoff Cup, which they won. In 1898, Royal Swedish Yacht Club sailors participated in a regatta in Norway, and in Kiel Week the year after. In 1912, the Royal Swedish Yacht Club organised the sailing event at the 1912 Summer Olympics.

The first Round Gotland Race was organised 7–9 July 1937 with 42 participating boats on a 250 nautical miles (460 km; 290 mi) course starting and finishing in Visby.

The yacht club took part founding the Swedish Sailing Federation in 1905 and Scandinavian Yacht Racing Union in 1915. Between 1893 and 1945, the Royal Swedish Yacht Club held lotteries on 65 boats to a combined worth of SEK 420,000. The Royal Swedish Yacht Club bought Lökholmen in 1945.

The Royal Swedish Yacht Club were the Challenger of Record for the 2013 America's Cup, where they were represented by Artemis Racing. Artemis Racing also completed in the 2017 America's Cup, where they were defeated by Emirates Team New Zealand in the Louis Vuitton Cup finals.

At the 2020 Summer Olympics, Royal Swedish Yacht Club sailors Anton Dahlberg and Fredrik Bergström finished second in the men's 470 event, while Josefin Olsson did the same in the Laser Radial event.

== Sailors ==
Sailors that have participated in the Summer Olympics while representing the Royal Swedish Yacht Club:

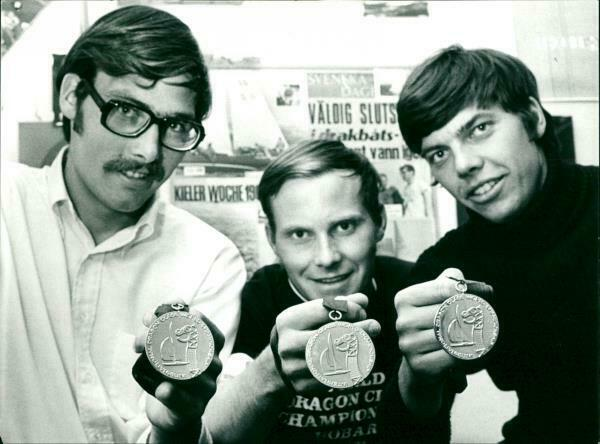
Royal Swedish Yacht Club sailors Peter Sundelin, Jörgen Sundelin and Ulf Sundelin

- Olle Åkerlund
- Erland Almkvist
- Karl-Robert Ameln
- Per Bergman
- Åke Bergqvist
- Dick Bergström
- Fredrik Bergström
- Kurt Bergström
- Sidney Boldt-Christmas
- Detlow von Braun
- John Carlsson
- Hugo Clason
- Anton Dahlberg
- Lennart Ekdahl
- Anders Ekström
- Per Gedda
- Ragnar Gripe
- Torsten Grönfors
- Edvin Hagberg
- Jonas Häggbom
- Emil Hagström
- Clarence Hammar
- Stig Hedberg
- Magnus Hellström
- Emil Henriques
- Bengt Heyman
- Martin Hindorff
- Styrbjörn Holm
- Tore Holm
- Emil Järudd
- Folke Johnson
- Cecilia Jonsson
- Jonas Jonsson
- Bo Kaiser
- Sigurd Kander
- Arne Karlsson
- Hjalmar Karlsson
- Ivan Lamby
- Arvid Laurin
- Anders Liljeblad
- Erik Lindqvist
- Håkan Lindström
- Karl Ljungberg
- Hjalmar Lönnroth
- Fredrik Lööf
- Torsten Lord
- Lars Lundström
- Gustaf Månsson
- Olof Mark
- Wilhelm Moberg
- Hans Nyström
- Eje Öberg
- August Olsson
- Josefin Olsson
- Sebastian Östling
- Lennart Persson
- Nils Persson
- Nils Rinman
- Olle Rinman
- Dagmar Salén
- Gösta Salén
- Sven Salén
- Hugo Sällström
- Max Salminen
- Carl Sandblom
- John Sandblom
- Philip Sandblom
- Arne Settergren
- Arvid Sjöqvist
- Fritz Sjöqvist
- Sture Stork
- Jörgen Sundelin
- Peter Sundelin
- Stefan Sundelin
- Ulf Sundelin
- Daniel Sundén-Cullberg
- Karl Suneson
- Alvar Thiel
- Lars Thörn
- Wilhelm Törsleff
- Marcus Wallenberg Jr.
- Uno Wallentin
- Tony Wallin
- Bo Westerberg
- Herbert Westermark
- Nils Westermark

== Commodores ==
- Claes Cronstedt (1831–37)
- Claes Fleming (1837–53)
- Claes Annerstedt (1853–66)
- Reinhold von Feilitzen (1866–75)
- J. R. Lagercrantz (1875–96)
- Herman af Petersens (1896–97)
- Otto Lagerberg (1897–1900)
- Louis Palander (1900–01)
- F. W. Lennman (1901–05)
- Jacob Hägg (1905–08)
- none 1908–09
- Prince Wilhelm (1909–10)
- Oscar Holtermann (1910–25)
- Rolf von Heidenstam (1925–35)
- Otto Lybeck (1936–46)
- Jacob Wallenberg (1946–55)
- K. G. Hamilton (1955–59)
- Gudmund Silfverstolpe (1959–67)
- Per Gedda (1967–70)
- Ola Wettergren (1970–75)
- Sven H. Salén (1982–88)
- Gunnar Ekdahl (1988–92)
- Carl-Gustaf Piehl (1992–01)
- Jacob Wallenberg (2011–18)
- Staffan Salén (2011–2018)
- Patrik Salén (2018–present)

== See also ==
- List of International Council of Yacht Clubs members
- Segelsällskapet Fjord
