= Nils Bertelsen =

Norwegian sailor (1879–1958)

Olympic medal record

Men's sailing

Representing Norway
Gold medal – first place	1912 Stockholm	12 metre class

Niels Berhtelsen (29 September 1879 – 5 October 1958) was a Norwegian sailor who competed in the 1912 Summer Olympics.

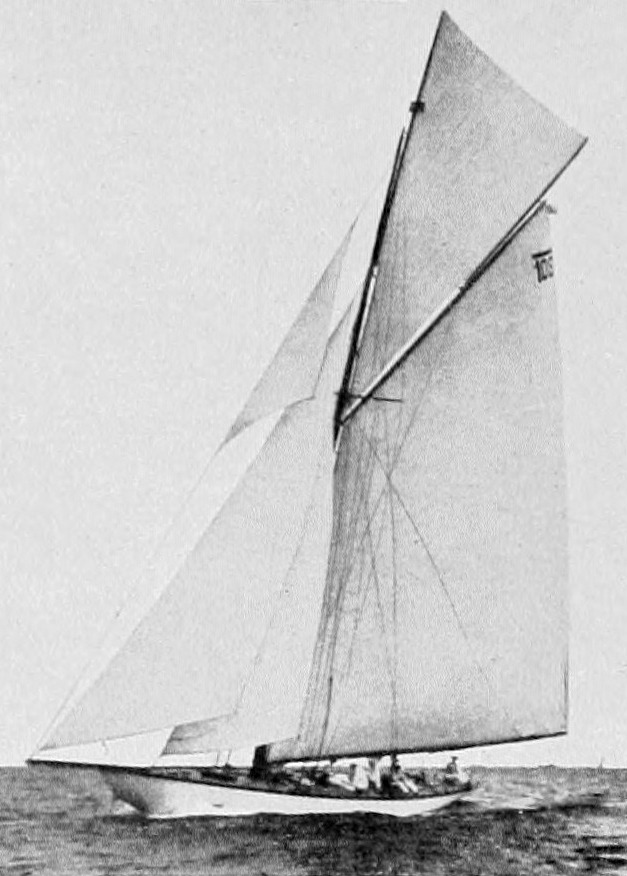
1912 magda IX

He was a crew member of the Norwegian boat Magda IX. Niels and his crew mates Alfred Larsen, Johan Anker, Halfdan Hansen, Magnus Konow, Petter Larsen, Cristian Staib, Carl Thaulow, Arnfinn Heje and Eilert Falch-Lund all competed in the 1912 Summer Olympics winning a gold medal in the 12-metre class.

The eighteen sailors represented Norway in the nation's second appearance in sailing.

Niels and the crew completed the race in a time of 3:17:17, gaining them 7 points; in race two, they completed the race in 3:32:00, gaining another 7 points for the team. The team gained 7 points for the nation and finished first place, gaining the whole crew a gold medal each. These medals were also the first medal of any sort Norwegian sailors had won.
