= Sailing at the 1912 Summer Olympics – 12 Metre =

12-Metre at the Games of the V Olympiad
- Line drawing of the 12-Metre
- Venue: Nynäshamn
- Dates: First race: 20 July 1912; Last race: 21 July 1912
- Competitors: 27 from 3 nations
- Teams: 3

Medalists
1st place, gold medalist(s)		Johan Anker, Nils Bertelsen, Eilert Falch-Lund, Halfdan Hansen, Magnus Konow, Arnfinn Heje, Alfred Larsen, Petter Larsen, Christian Staib, Carl Thaulow	Norway
2nd place, silver medalist(s)		Nils Persson, Per Bergman, Dick Bergström, Kurt Bergström, Hugo Clason, Folke Johnson, Sigurd Kander, Ivan Lamby, Erik Lindqvist, Hugo Sällström	Sweden
3rd place, bronze medalist(s)		Ernst Krogius, Ferdinand Alfthan, Pekka Hartvall, Jarl Hulldén, Sigurd Juslén, Eino Sandelin, Johan Silén	Finland

The 12 Metre was a sailing event on the Sailing at the 1912 Summer Olympics program in Nynäshamn. Two races were scheduled plus eventual sail-offs. 27 sailors, on 3 boats, from 3 nations entered.

== Race schedule ==
●	Opening ceremony	●	Event competitions	●	Tie breakers	●	Closing ceremony

Date	July								
Date	19 Fri	20 Sat	21 Sun	22 Mon	23 Tue	24 Wed	25 Thu	26 Fri	27 Sat
12-Metre		●	●	●		International races			
Total gold medals				1					
Ceremonies	●								●

== Course area and course configuration ==
For the 12-Metre Course A was used.

1912 Olympic Course Area & courses
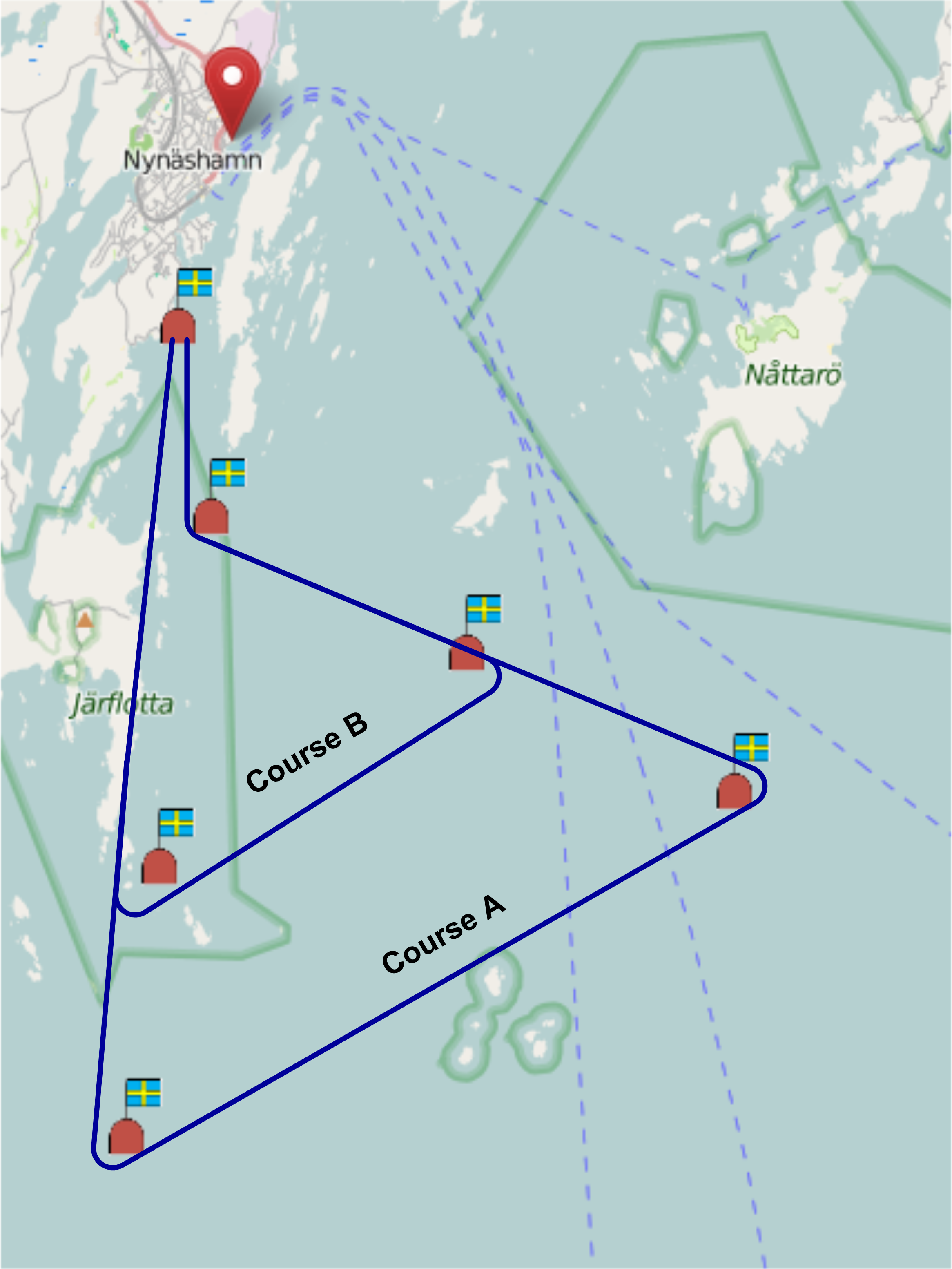

== Weather conditions ==
Date	Race	Description	Wind speed	Wind direction	Start
20-JUL-1912	1	Beautiful weather with a light easterly breeze.	5 knots (9.3 km/h) - 9 knots (17 km/h)		11:00
21-JUL-1912	2	Only a light breeze was blowing in the morning.	4 knots (7.4 km/h) - 6 knots (11 km/h)		11:00

== Final results ==
The 1912 Olympic scoring system was used. All competitors were male.

Rank	Country	Helmsman	Crew	Boat	Race 1		Race 2	
Rank	Country	Helmsman	Crew	Boat	Pos.	Pts.	Pos.	Pts.
1	Norway	Johan Anker	Nils Bertelsen; Eilert Falch-Lund; Halfdan Hansen; Magnus Konow; Arnfinn Heje; Alfred Larsen; Petter Larsen; Christian Staib; Carl Thaulow	Magda IX	3:17:17	7	3:32:00	7
2	Sweden	Nils Persson	Per Bergman; Dick Bergström; Kurt Bergström; Hugo Clason; Folke Johnson; Sigurd Kander; Ivan Lamby; Erik Lindqvist; Hugo Sällström	Erna Signe	3:24:13	3	3:48:06	3
3	Finland	Ernst Krogius	Ferdinand Alfthan; Pekka Hartvall; Jarl Hulldén; Sigurd Juslén; Eino Sandelin; Johan Silén	Heatherbell	3:25:45	1	3:48:55	1

== Daily standings ==
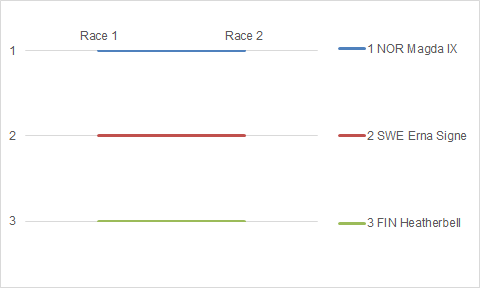
Graph showing the daily standings in the 12 Metre during the 1912 Summer Olympics

== Other information ==
=== Prizes ===
The helmsman of the winning yacht received a gold medal, with the members of the crew receiving silver-gilt medals. For second and third place, the helmsman and crew all received silver (for second) or bronze (for third) medals. The International Olympic Committee considers all crew members of the winning yacht to be gold medalists.

The following Commemorative Plaque were handed out by the Royal Swedish Yacht Club to the owners of:

1. Magda IX: Alfred Larsen
2. Erna Signe: Nils Persson
3. Heatherbell: Ernst Krogius
