= Sjöqvist =

Sjöqvist is a Swedish surname. Notable people with the surname include:

- Erik Sjöqvist (1903–1975), director of Swedish Cyprus Expedition and director of Swedish Institute at Rome
- Fritz Sjöqvist (1884–1962), Swedish sailor who competed in the 1912 Summer Olympics
- Ingeborg Sjöqvist (1912–2015), Swedish diver who competed in the 1932 Summer Olympics and in the 1936 Summer Olympics
- Johan Sjöqvist (1884–1960), Swedish sailor who competed in the 1912 Summer Olympics
- Laura Sjöqvist (1903–1964), Swedish diver who competed in the 1928 Summer Olympics
