= Lars Krogius =

Lars Krogius may refer to:

- Lars Krogius the Elder (1832–1890), Finnish sea captain, shipowner and businessman
- Lars Krogius the Younger (1860–1935), Finnish shipowner and businessman
