= Sandelin =

Sandelin is a Swedish surname. Notable people with the surname include:

- Scott Sandelin (born 1964), former American professional ice hockey player
- Jarmo Sandelin (born 1967), Swedish professional golfer
- Jorma Sandelin (1936–2026), Finnish archer
- Christer Sandelin (born 1961), Swedish musician
- Torsten Sandelin (1887–1950), Finnish gymnast and yacht racer
- Eino Sandelin (1864–1937), Finnish Olympic sailor
