= Sällström =

Sällström is a surname. Notable people with the surname include:

- Hugo Sällström (1870–1951), Swedish sailor
- Johanna Sällström (1974–2007), Swedish actress
- Linda Sällström (born 1988), Finnish footballer
- Per Sällström (1802–1839), Swedish opera tenor
