= Pavel Pavlov =

Pavel Pavlov may refer to:

- Pavel Pavlov (actor) (1885–1974), Russian actor
- Pavel Pavlov (sailor), Russian Olympic sailor
- Pavel Pavlov (sprinter) (1952–2004), Bulgarian Olympic sprinter
- Pavel Pavlov (wrestler) (born 1953), Bulgarian Greco-Roman wrestler and Olympic medalist
