= Nikolay Podgornov =

Nikolay Podgornov may refer to:

- Nikolay Podgornov (sailor), Russian sailor
- Nikolay Podgornov (politician) (1949–2026), Russian politician
