= Settergren =

Settergren is a surname. Notable people with the surname include:

- Arne Settergren (born 1935), Swedish sailor
- Johan Settergren (born 1978), Swedish tennis player
