= Arthur Ahnger =

Finnish sailor (1886–1940)

Olympic medal record

Men's Sailing
Bronze medal – third place	1912 Stockholm	8 metre class

Arthur Ahnger (28 February 1886 – 7 December 1940) was a Finnish sailor who competed in the 1912 Summer Olympics. He was a crew member of the Finnish boat Lucky Girl, which won the bronze medal in the 8 metre class.
