= Gunnar Tallberg =

Finnish sailor

Olympic medal record

Men's Sailing
Bronze medal – third place	1912 Stockholm	8 metre class

Gunnar Tallberg (December 23, 1881 – August 27, 1931) was a Finnish sailor who competed in the 1912 Summer Olympics. He was a crew member of the Finnish boat Lucky Girl, which won the bronze medal in the 8 metre class.
