= Lars Krogius the Elder =

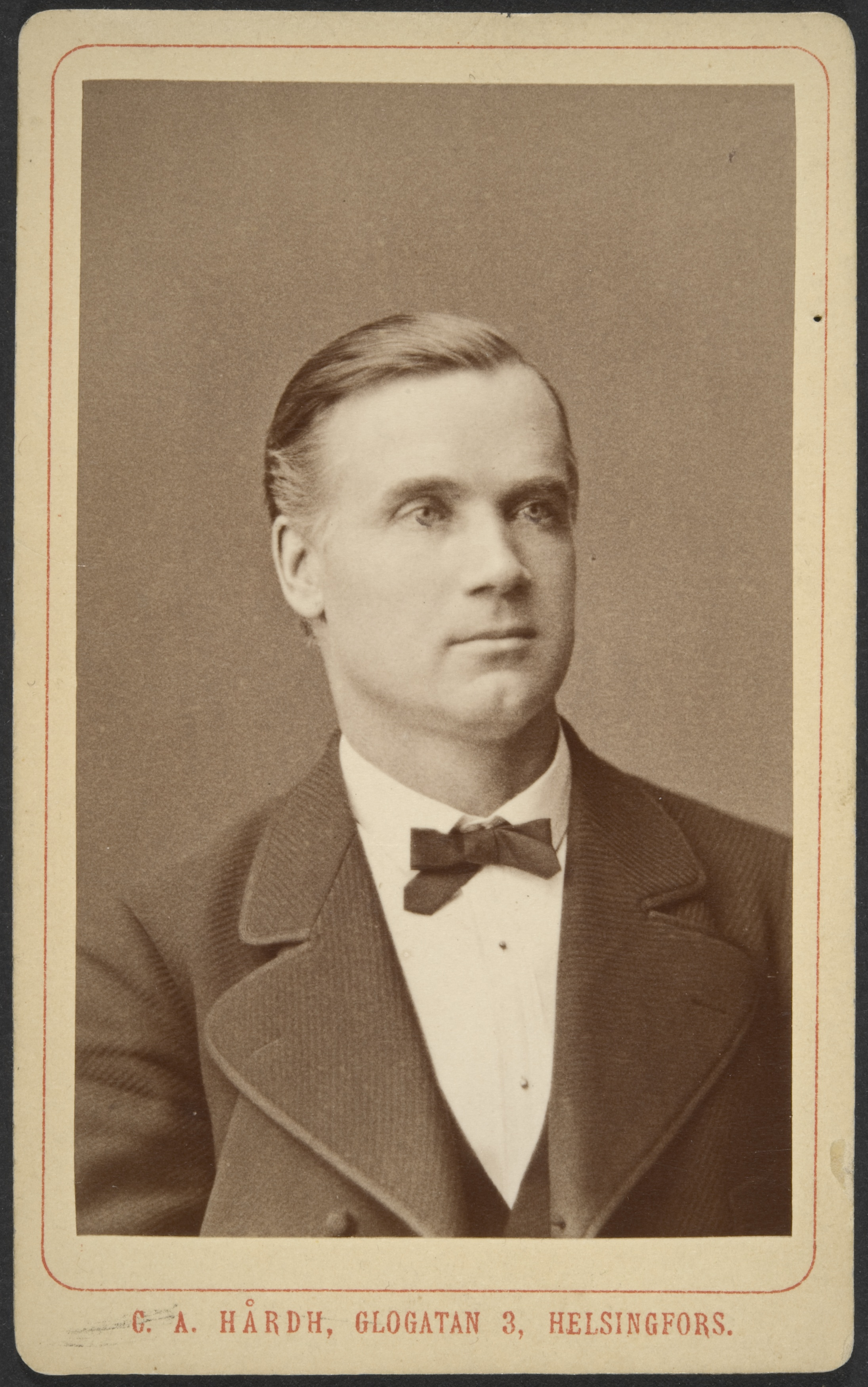
Lars Krogius the Elder during the 1860s.

Lars Thiodolf Krogius (29 January 1832 – 9 March 1890) was a Finnish sea captain and shipowner. He was the father of Lars Krogius the Younger and Ernst Krogius.

Born in Pyhtää, Krogius graduated from the Finnish Cadet Corps, went to sea in 1850 and was a commander for the Russian-American Company. He participated in three circumnavigations of the globe. From 1863 to 1889 he headed the Helsinki Navigation School and was also captain of ships on the Stockholm-Helsinki-St. Petersburg route. In 1872 he founded a forwarding company, Lars Krogius & Co. In 1883, he founded Finland Steamship Company, and was its CEO between 1883 and 1890.

Krogius was a representative of Naantali within the bourgeoisie during the Diet of 1872, 1877–1878, 1882 and 1885. As a member of the Diet, he was a liberal, although he was not a member of any party.

Krogius died at the age of 58 in Helsinki in 1890.
