= Bertel Juslén =

Finnish sailor

Personal information
- Full name: Bertel Juslén
- Nationality: Finnish
- Born: June 19, 1880 Ekenäs, Finland
- Died: August 13, 1951 (aged 71) Kotka, Finland

Sport

Sailing career
- Class: 8 Metre

Bertel Juslén (August 13, 1880, Ekenäs – June 19, 1951 Kotka) was a sailor from Finland, who represented his country at the 1912 Summer Olympics in Nynäshamn, Sweden in the 8 Metre.
