= Viktor Markov =

Russian sailor

Personal information
- Full name: Viktor Markov
- Born: Виктор Марков unknown
- Died: unknown

Sailing career
- Sport: Sailing
- Class: 8 Metre
- Updated on 2014-02-03

Viktor (Vladimir) Markov (Russian: Владимир Александрович Марков) was a sailor from Russia, who represented his country at the 1912 Summer Olympics in Nynäshamn, Sweden in the 8 Metre.
