= Bertil Tallberg =

Finnish sailor

Olympic medal record

Men's Sailing
Bronze medal – third place	1912 Stockholm	8 metre class

Bertil Tallberg (September 17, 1883 – April 20, 1963) was a Finnish sailor who competed in the 1912 Summer Olympics. He was a crew member of the Finnish boat Lucky Girl, which won the bronze medal in the 8 metre class.

He was the son of Julius Tallberg.
