= Yevgeny Kun =

Russian sailor

Personal information
- Full name: Yevgeny Kun
- Nationality: Russian
- Born: Евгений Александрович Кун unknown
- Died: unknown

Sailing career
- Sport: Sailing
- Class: 8 Metre

Yevgeny Kun (Евгений Александрович Кун) was a sailor from Russia, who represented his country at the 1912 Summer Olympics in Nynäshamn, Sweden in the 8 Metre.
