= Hagbart Steffens =

Norwegian sportsperson

Personal information
- Full name: Hagbart Steffens
- Nationality: Norwegian
- Born: 13 August 1874 Kristiania, Norway
- Died: 27 June 1932 (aged 57)

Sport

Sailing career
- Class: 8 Metre
- Updated on 9 May 2015

Hagbart Steffens (13 August 1874 – 27 June 1932) was a Norwegian sportsperson. As a yacht racer he competed in the 1908 Summer Olympics.

Steffens was born in Kristiania (Today known as Oslo). In 1908 he was part of the Norwegian Fram crew, which finished fourth in the Olympics 8 metre class competition. He represented the Royal Norwegian Yacht Club. He was also an early member of the skiing club SK Ondur. He died in June 1932.
