= Curt Andstén =

Finnish sailor

Curt Magnus Wilhelm Andstén (12 September 1881 – 1 June 1926) was a Finnish sailor who competed in the 1912 Summer Olympics. He was a crew member of the Finnish boat Örn, which finished fourth in the 8 metre class competition.
