= Torleiv Corneliussen =

Norwegian sailor (1890–1975)

Olympic medal record

Men's sailing

Representing Norway
Gold medal – first place	1912 Stockholm	8 metre class

Torleiv Schibsted Corneliussen (July 25, 1890 – April 29, 1975) was a Norwegian sailor who competed in the 1912 Summer Olympics. He was a crew member of the Norwegian boat Taifun, which won the gold medal in the 8 metre class.
