= Thoralf Glad =

Norwegian sailor

Olympic medal record

Men's sailing

Representing Norway
Gold medal – first place	1912 Stockholm	8 metre class

Thoralf Glad (February 1, 1878 – July 17, 1969) was a Norwegian sailor who competed in the 1912 Summer Olympics. He was a crew member of the Norwegian boat Taifun, which won the gold medal in the 8 metre class.
