= Lars Krogius the Younger =

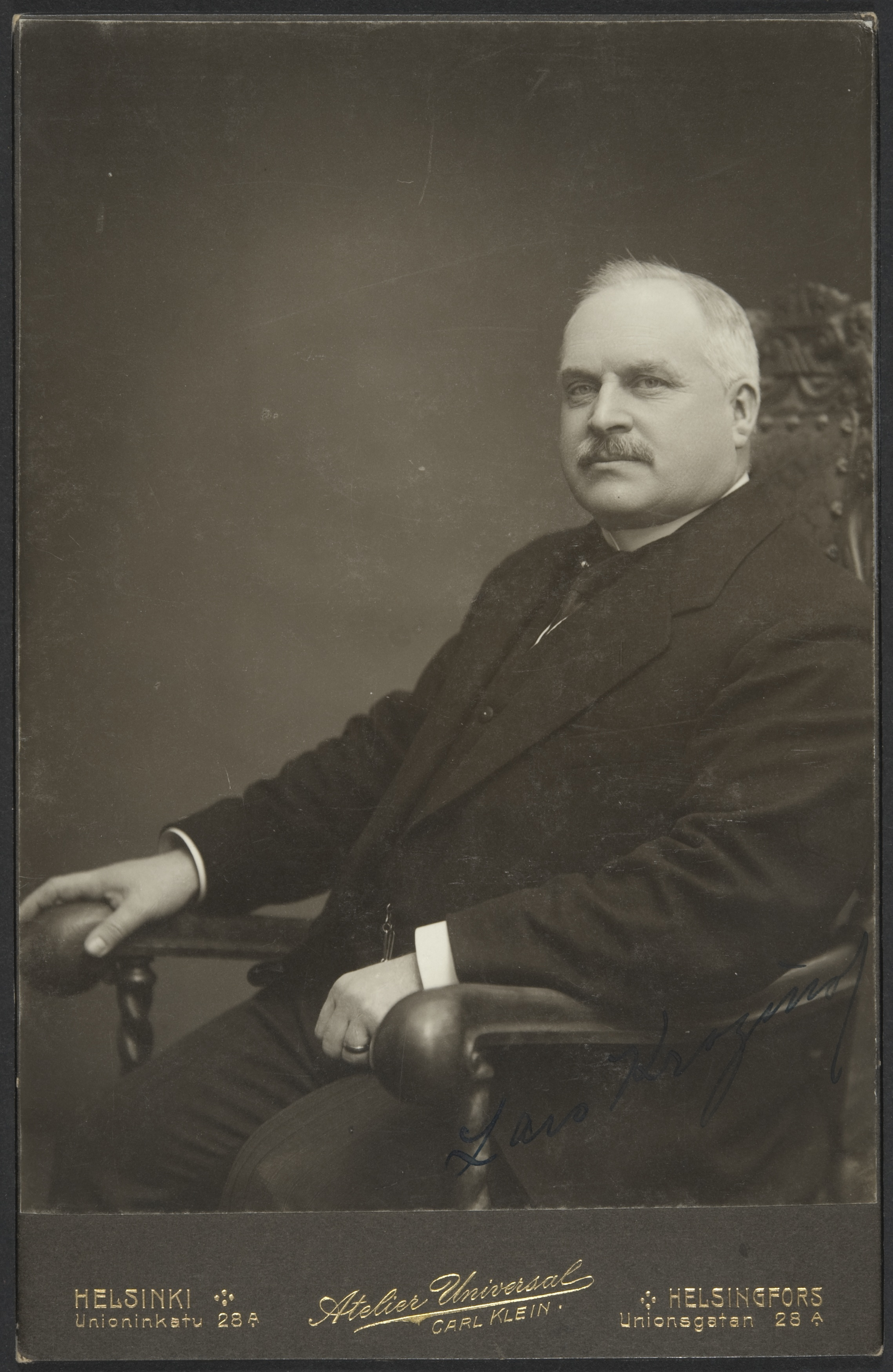
Lars Krogius the Younger during the 1910s.

Lars Karl Krogius (5 August 1860 – 13 October 1935) was a Finnish shipowner and CEO of Finland Steamship Company from 1890 to 1920. He played a central role in the development of Finland's winter shipping. His father was Lars Krogius the Elder and his brother was Ernst Krogius.

== Biography ==
Krogius was born on board the ship Nikolai in the naval base of Ajan on the Sea of Okhotsk. He graduated from Helsingfors lyceum in 1879 with the grade of laudatur. He then began studies in chemistry, English, Russian and French at the University of Helsinki. He also took a course in accounting. He concluded his studies in the autumn of 1880 and instead travelled to England to study English and shipping. At the end of 1881, Krogius travelled to France and then returned to Helsinki in the spring of 1882.

He became director of the forwarding and inspection company Lars Krogius & Co in 1882, which was founded by his father Lars Krogius the Elder. He was CEO of Finland Steamship Company 1890–1920. Under his leadership, Finland Steamship Company began operating on winter routes and developed into Finland's largest shipping company. The Helsinki–Copenhagen–Hull route was particularly important for winter traffic. In 1890, the company had 9 ships, and by the outbreak of the Civil War, the number had increased to almost 40 ships. During the Finnish Civil War, Krogius led the transport of weapons and Finnish hunters through the ice-covered Gulf of Bothnia to Finland.

Krogius served on the City Council of Helsinki for several years. He also represented the Helsinki bourgeoisie at the Diet in 1896 and 1900. Krogius co-founded a brick factory in Kerava in 1893 and the steamship company Finlands Lloyd in 1896, together with his brother Ernst Krogius. He was also one of the founders of Suomen Merivakuutus Osakeyhtiö (1898, Swedish: Finlands Sjöförsäkringsaktiebolag), Helsingin Osakepankki (1913), Finlands Sjöfartsförbund (1917) and Kissakoski pappersbruk.

Alongside his work, Krogius was involved in cycling and was one of the first to import bicycles with high front wheels to Finland. He participated in the first official cycling competitions in Finland, which were held in October 1884 in Kaisaniemi Park in Helsinki. Krogius was also active in sports activities. During his school days, he had created a skating rink outside the Pohjoisranta and in 1882 he became secretary of the Helsinki Gymnastics Club. Even when Krogius had less time to devote to sports, he still supported the activities, for example by using the Finland Steamship Company to transport athletes to international competitions.

He was awarded the title of kauppaneuvos in 1989. He married Ida Nymander in 1887 and Sigrid Liljeqvist in 1901. He died at the age of 75 in Huopalahti (now Helsinki) in 1935.

== Bibliography ==
- En resa till Sverige vid upprorets utbrott. En farlig äventyrlig färd (1919).
