= Torsten Sandelin =

Finnish gymnast

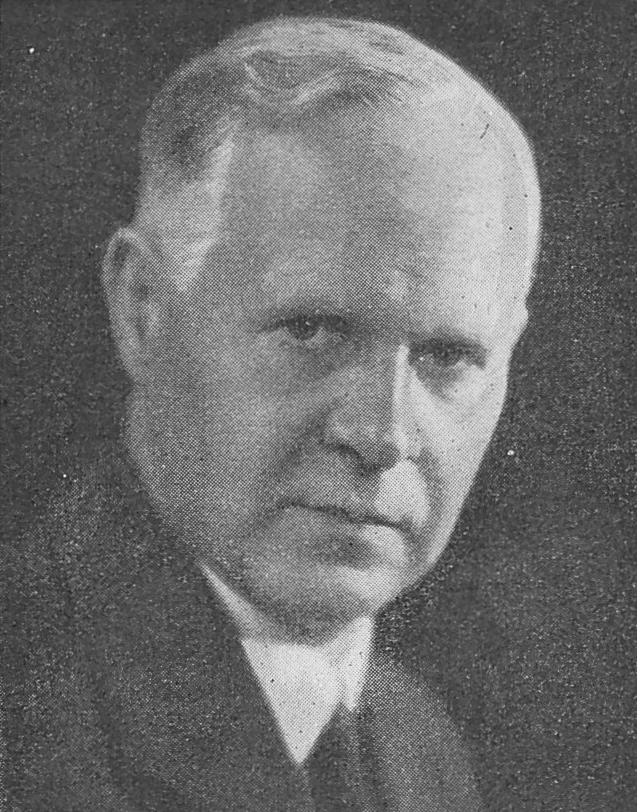
- Sandelin in 1938

Personal information
- Full name: Karl Viktor Torsten Sandelin
- Born: 28 September 1887 Maalahti, Grand Duchy of Finland, Russian Empire
- Died: 8 May 1950 (aged 62) Helsinki, Finland
- Relatives: Eino Sandelin (brother)

Gymnastics career
- Discipline: Men's artistic gymnastics
- Country represented: Finland
- Club: Ylioppilasvoimistelijat
Medal record
Men's artistic gymnastics
Representing Finland
Olympic Games
Bronze medal – third place	1908 London	Team

Karl Viktor Torsten Sandelin (28 September 1887 – 8 May 1950) was a Finnish gymnast and Olympic bronze medalist.

== Early life and education ==
Sandelin was born on 28 September 1887 to rural dean Frans Viktor Sandelin and Emma Josefina Durchman. Eino Sandelin, who won bronze in the 1912 games, was his brother. He completed his matriculation exam in Gamlakarleby Swedish Coeducational Gymnasium in 1907 and graduated as a Doctor of Medicine and Surgery from the University of Helsinki in 1916.

== Athletic career ==
Torsten Sandelin at the Olympic Games
Games	Sport	Event	Rank	Notes
1908 Summer Olympics	Gymnastics	Team	3rd	Source:
1912 Summer Olympics	Sailing	6 Metre	5th	Boat: Finn II

He won the Finnish national championship in team gymnastics as a member of Ylioppilasvoimistelijat in 1909.

== Post-athletic career ==
Sandelin began working as a physician in 1915 and as a surgeon in 1917. He was the chairman of the Finska Läkaresällskapet, the Swedish-speaking Finnish Society of Medicine, in 1939.

During the Second World War, he served at the Tilkka military hospital. He reached the rank of major (Med.) in 1941. He received the Cross of Liberty, 2nd Class in 1942.

== Personal life ==
Sandelin married Aina Emilia Gylling, the daughter of senator Oscar Fredrik Wilhelm Gylling, in 1915. They had three children:

1. Lars Viktor (1916–)
2. Hedvig Elisabet (1919–)
3. Clara Birgitta (1923–)

Sandelin died on 8 May 1950 and he and his wife are buried at the Hietaniemi Cemetery.
