= SK Ondur =

Norwegian skiing club

Skiklubben Ondur was a Norwegian skiing club, based in Oslo but with its sporting facilities in Vestre Aker (before 1900) and Bærum. It was founded in 1891.

== History ==
The club was founded on 21 November 1891 by schoolboys from Kristiania city (now: Oslo). The name Ondur is an Old Norse word for ski. The original by-laws of the club prescribed a membership that should not surpass 15; also, the active members had to hail from Kristiania.

In the first two years, the boys practiced their sport in different locations. From 1893 to 1900, the club rented a lot at Tangen near Bogstadvannet in Vestre Aker. A skiing cabin was erected, and in 1896 a small ski jumping hill Ondurbakken was established. In 1900 the club moved to Muren near Øverland in Bærum, where a cabin Ondurstua and a small ski jumping hill was also established.

Club matches were held against the clubs Fram and Svev in 1892, and against Fram in 1893. The match against Fram was thereafter put on a hiatus until being relaunched in 1912. On the national level of the skiing sport, Ondur had a certain sporting success in the 1890s and 1900s, especially from 1897, with Thorvald Mostue as the top achiever. Among others, Mostue finished fourth in the 50 kilometres cross-country at the Holmenkollen Ski Festival in 1902.

The first chairman of Ondur was Jacob Nissen. Other members include Eilert Falch-Lund, Hagbart Steffens, Rudolf Horn and Hagbarth Lund. The members socialized within the upper social strata; in 1904 Ondurstua was visited by Crown Prince Gustaf Adolf of Sweden.
