= Yevgeny Lomach =

Russian sailor

Ernest Lomach
Personal information
- Full name: Ernest Edward Lommatsch
- Nickname: Евгений
- Born: Эрнест Эдуардович Ломач; August 12, 1893
- Died: 1993 (aged 99–100) San Francisco

Sailing career
- Sport: Sailing
- Class: 8 Metre

Yevgeny (Ernest) Lomach (Russian: Эрнест Эдуардович Ломач) was a sailor from Russia, who represented his country at the 1912 Summer Olympics in Nynäshamn, Sweden in the 8 Metre.
