= Carl-Oscar Girsén =

Finnish sailor (1889–1930)

Carl Girsén
Personal information
- Full name: Carl-Oscar Girsén
- Nationality: Finnish
- Born: 16 February 1889 Helsinki, Finland
- Died: 22 April 1930 (aged 41) Helsinki, Finland

Sport

Sailing career
- Class: 8 Metre
- Club: Nyländska Jaktklubben

Carl-Oscar Girsén (16 February 1889 – 22 April 1930 in Helsinki) was a sailor from Finland who represented his country at the 1912 Summer Olympics in Nynäshamn, Sweden in the 8 Metre on the yacht Örn.

Born in Helsinki, Girsén represented Nyländska Jaktklubben.
