= Th. Valentin Aass =

Norwegian sailor and civil servant (1887–1961)

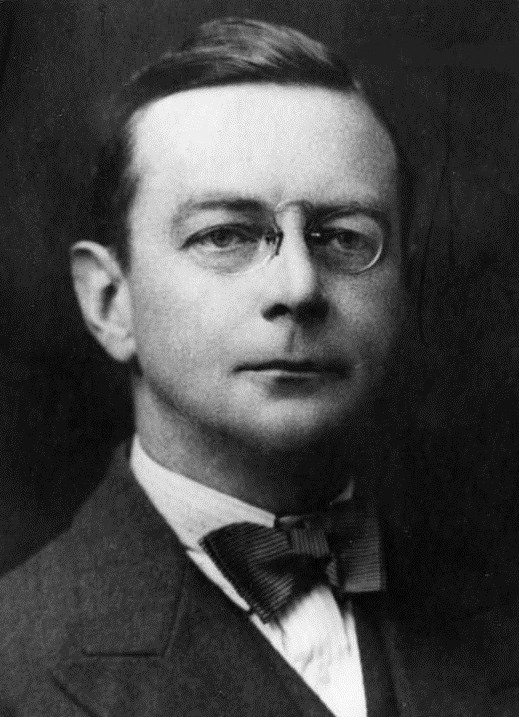

Personal information
- Born: 28 April 1887
- Died: 14 August 1961 (aged 74)

Sailing career
- Sport: Sailing
Medal record
Men's Sailing
Representing Norway
Olympic Games
Gold medal – first place	1912 Stockholm	8 metre class

Thomas Valentin "Valla" Aass (28 April 1887 – 14 August 1961) was a Norwegian sailor and civil servant in the foreign service.

He was born in Kristiania as a son of wholesaler Julius Aas (1832–1909) and Hulda Mathilde Olsen (1848–1929). In 1923, he married lighthouse director's daughter Ingeborg Horn.

He finished his secondary education in 1905 and graduated from the Royal Frederick University with the cand.jur. degree in 1911. From 1912 to 1915, he was a deputy to the stipendiary magistrate of Fredrikstad. He competed in the 1912 Summer Olympics as a crew member of the Norwegian boat Taifun, which won the gold medal in the 8 metre class. He represented the Royal Norwegian Yacht Club.

In 1917 he was hired in the foreign service as a secretary in the Ministry of Foreign Affairs. He was promoted to acting assistant secretary in 1920, then acting consul in Barcelona in 1921, and acting legation secretary in London in 1922. He was promoted to vice consul in the next year. In 1930, he was moved to the Norwegian legation in Stockholm as a secretary. He also had responsibility for Kaunas, Lithuania.

After a period at home as assistant secretary in the 2nd Trade Office of the Ministry of Foreign Affairs from 1934 to 1940, he returned to the Norwegian legation in Stockholm as councillor of trade. The legation became of the utmost importance when Norway was dragged into the Second World War while Sweden remained neutral. He was promoted to legation councillor in 1943 and in 1946 consul-general in Gothenburg.

He was decorated as a Knight, First Class of the Order of St. Olav (1946), Commander of the Order of the Polar Star, Order of Vasa, Order of Isabella the Catholic; Knight of the Order of the Dannebrog and Officer of the Order of Polonia Restituta. He died in April 1961 and was buried at Ris.
