= Sailing at the 1912 Summer Olympics – 8 Metre =

8-Metre at the Games of the V Olympiad
- Line drawing of the 8-Metre
- Venue: Nynäshamn
- Dates: First race: 20 July 1912; Last race: 22 July 1912
- Competitors: 36 from 4 nations
- Teams: 7

Medalists
| 1st place, gold medalist(s) | | Thoralf Glad, Thomas Aas, Andreas Brecke, Torleiv Corneliussen, Christian Jebe | Norway |
| 2nd place, silver medalist(s) | | Bengt Heyman, Emil Henriques, Alvar Thiel, Herbert Westermark, Nils Westermark | Sweden |
| 3rd place, bronze medalist(s) | | Bertil Tallberg, Arthur Ahnger, Emil Lindh, Gunnar Tallberg, Georg Westling | Finland |

The 8 Metre was a sailing event on the Sailing at the 1912 Summer Olympics program in Nynäshamn. Two races were scheduled plus eventual sail-off's. 18 sailors, on 6 boats, from 5 nations entered.

== Race schedule ==
| ● | Opening ceremony | ● | Event competitions | ● | Tie breakers | ● | Closing ceremony |

| Date | July | | | | | | | | |
| Date | 19 Fri | 20 Sat | 21 Sun | 22 Mon | 23 Tue | 24 Wed | 25 Thu | 26 Fri | 27 Sat |
|---|---|---|---|---|---|---|---|---|---|
| 8-Metre | | ● | ● | ● | | International races | | | |
| Total gold medals | | | | 1 | | | | | |
| Ceremonies | ● | | | | | | | | ● |

== Course area and course configuration ==
For the 8-Metre Course B was used.

1912 Olympic Course Area & courses
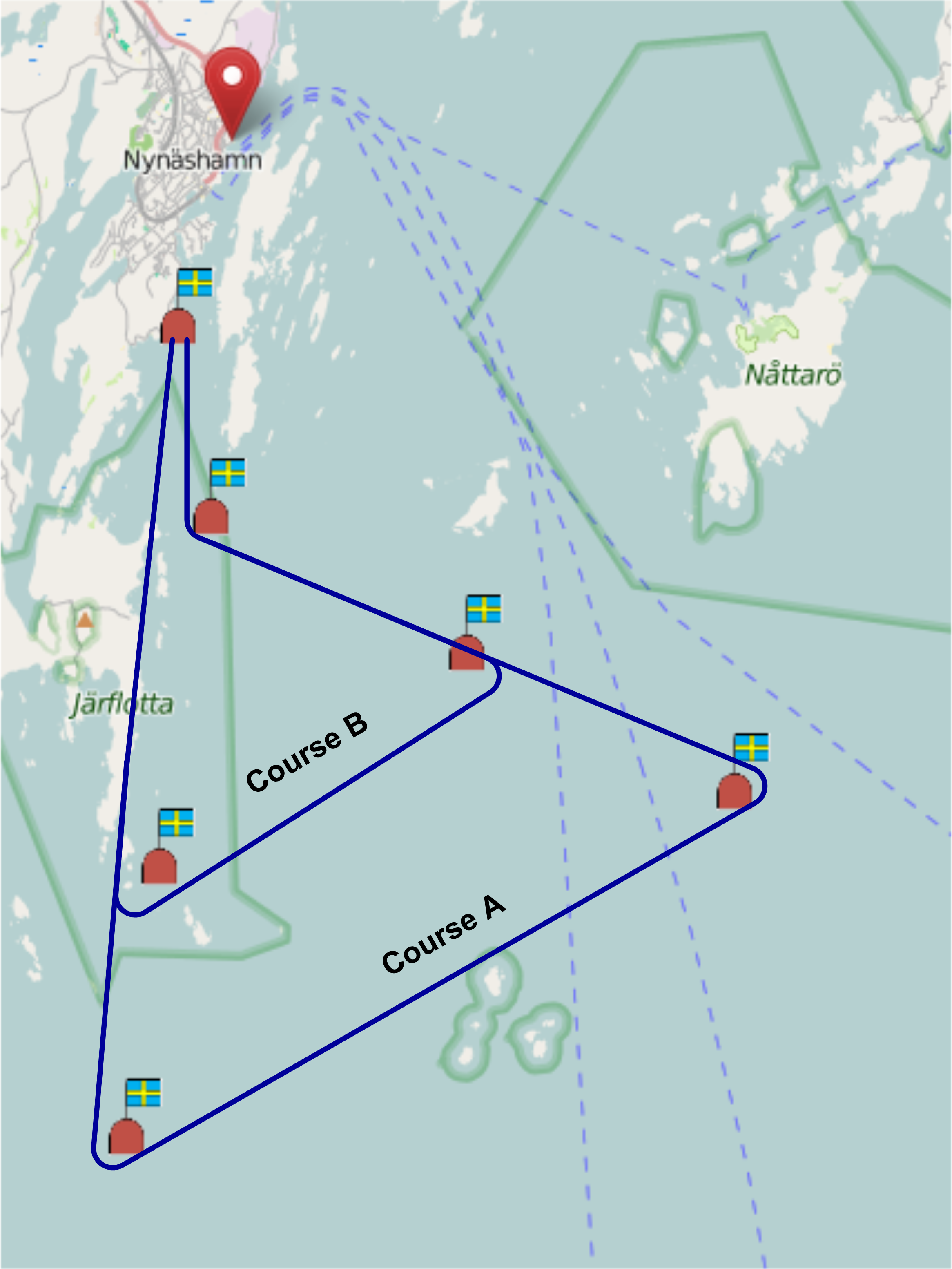

== Weather conditions ==
| Date | Race | Description | Wind speed | Wind direction | Start |
|---|---|---|---|---|---|
| 20 July 1912 | 1 | Light easterly breeze | 5 knots (9.3 km/h) - 9 knots (17 km/h) | | 11:30 |
| 21 July 1912 | 2 | Light breeze in the morning | 4 knots (7.4 km/h) - 6 knots (11 km/h) | | 11:30 |
| 22 July 1912 | 3 | Very light winds | 5 knots (9.3 km/h) - 7 knots (13 km/h) | | 11:10 |

== Final results ==
The 1912 Olympic scoring system was used. All competitors were male.

| Rank | Country | Helmsman | Crew | Boat | Race 1 | | Race 2 | | Race 3 | |
| Rank | Country | Helmsman | Crew | Boat | Pos. | Pts. | Pos. | Pts. | Pos. | Pts. |
| 1 | Norway | Thoralf Glad | Thomas Aas; Andreas Brecke; Torleiv Corneliussen; Christian Jebe | Taifun | 2:15:59 | 7 | 2:12:59 | 7 | | |
| 2 | Sweden | Bengt Heyman | Emil Henriques; Alvar Thiel; Herbert Westermark; Nils Westermark | Sans Atout | 2:16:40 | 3 | 2:16:04 | 0 | 2:26:44 | 7 |
| 3 | Finland | Bertil Tallberg | Arthur Ahnger; Emil Lindh; Gunnar Tallberg; Georg Westling | Lucky Girl | 2:21:03 | 0 | 2:14:50 | 3 | 2:27:41 | 3 |
| 4 | Finland | Gustaf Estlander | Curt Andstén; Jarl Andstén; Carl-Oscar Girsén; Bertel Juslén | Örn | 2:17:28 | 1 | 2:14:54 | 1 | | |
| 5 | Russian Empire | Herman von Adlerberg | Johan Farber; Vladimir Yelevich; Vladimir Lurasov; Nikolay Podgornov | Bylina | 2:27:59 | 0 | 2:21:43 | 0 | | |
| 5 | Russian Empire | Vyatcheslav Kuzmichev | Yevgeny Kun; Yevgeny Lomach; Viktor Markov; Pavel Pavlov | Norman | 2:18:52 | 0 | 2:16:15 | 0 | | |
| 5 | Sweden | Fritz Sjöqvist | Johan Sjöqvist; Ragnar Gripe; Thorsten Grönfors; Gunnar Månsson; Emil Hagström | K.S.S.S. | 2:23:46 | 0 | 2:16:33 | 0 | | |

- There was one sail-off between Sans Atout and Lucky Girl for place 2 & 3.

== Daily standings ==
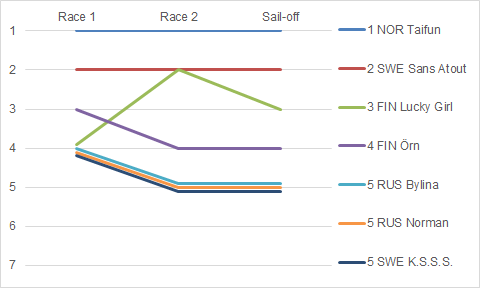
Graph showing the daily standings in the 8 Metre during the 1912 Summer Olympics

== Notes ==
In the 8 Metre there was one spare boat:

| Country | Boatsname |
|---|---|
| Sweden | Lucie IV |

== Other information ==
=== Prizes ===
The following Commemorative Plaque were handed out by the Royal Swedish Yacht Club to the owners of:

1. Taifun: Thoralf Glad
2. Sans Atout: Bengt Heyman
3. Lucky Girl: Bertil Tallberg & Gunnar Tallberg
