= Jarl Andstén =

Finnish sailor

Personal information
- Full name: Jarl Oskar Wilhelm Andstén
- Nationality: Finnish
- Born: December 7, 1884 Helsinki, Finland
- Died: July 2, 1943 (aged 58) Helsinki, Finland

Sport

Sailing career
- Class: 8 Metre

Jarl Oskar Wilhelm Andstén (December 7, 1884 – July 2, 1943) was a sailor from Finland, who represented his country at the 1912 Summer Olympics in Nynäshamn, Sweden in the 8 Metre. He was born and died in Helsinki.
