= Herman von Adlerberg =

Russian sailor

Herman Adlerberg
Personal information
- Full name: Herman Adlerberg
- Nationality: Russian
- Born: 9 December 1890
- Died: 1919 (aged 28–29)

Sport

Sailing career
- Class: 8 Metre

Herman Adlerberg (Russian: Ге́рман Алекса́ндрович А́длерберг, romanized: German Aleksandrovich Adlerberg; 9 December 1890 – 1919) was a sailor from the Russian Empire, who represented his country at the 1912 Summer Olympics in Nynäshamn, Sweden in the 8 Metre.
