= Johan Färber =

Russian sailor

Personal information
- Full name: Johan Färber
- Nationality: Russian

Sport

Sailing career
- Class: 8 Metre

Johan Färber (Russian: Йохан Фербер, romanized: Yokhan Ferber) was a sailor from Russia, who represented his country at the 1912 Summer Olympics in Nynäshamn, Sweden in the 8 Metre.
