= Georg Westling =

Finnish sailor

Medal record

Sailing

Representing Finland

Olympic Games
| Bronze medal – third place | 1912 Stockholm | 8 metre class |

Georg Westling (August 24, 1879 – November 14, 1930) was a Finnish sailor who competed in the 1912 Summer Olympics. He was a crew member of the Finnish boat Lucky Girl, which won the bronze medal in the 8 metre class.
