= Per Sällström =

Swedish actor

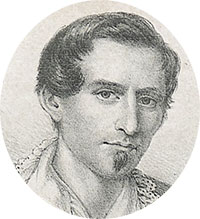
- Born: 1802; Swedish
- Occupation: opera singer (tenor)
- Known for: the Royal Swedish Opera

Per Sällström (1802-1839) was a Swedish opera singer (tenor). He was an elite member of the Royal Swedish Opera from 1820 to 1839.

He was a student of Edouard Du Puy and took over many of his roles at the Royal Opera when Du Puy died in 1822 and enjoyed great popularity in the 1820s and -30s, during which he was regarded as one of the greater singers of the opera. His voice was described as a flexible and soft tenor and he was given much attention because of his "romantic enchantment of his voice and personality". However, he suffered from a frail health and chest pains, which damaged his voice during the 1830s and cause his early death.
