= Nikolay Podgornov (sailor) =

Russian sailor

Personal information
- Full name: Nikolay Podgornov
- Nationality: Russian

Sailing career
- Sport: Sailing
- Class: 8 Metre

Nikolay Podgornov (Russian: Николай Подгорнов) was a sailor from Russia, who represented his country at the 1912 Summer Olympics in Nynäshamn, Sweden in the 8 Metre
