= Iwan Lamby =

Swedish sailor (1885–1970)

Olympic medal record

Men's Sailing
Silver medal – second place	1912 Stockholm	12 metre class

Nils Iwan Lamby (October 29, 1885 – January 15, 1970) was a Swedish sailor who competed in the 1912 Summer Olympics. He was a crew member of the Swedish boat Erna Signe, which won the silver medal in the 12 metre class.
