= Bengt Heyman =

Swedish sailor (1883–1942)

Olympic medal record

Men's Sailing
Silver medal – second place	1912 Stockholm	8 metre class

Bengt Heyman (August 26, 1883 – June 3, 1942) was a Swedish sailor who competed in the 1912 Summer Olympics. He was a crew member of the Swedish boat Sans Atout, which won the silver medal in the 8 metre class.
