= Max Alfthan =

Finnish sailor (1892–1960)

Olympic medal record

Men's Sailing
Bronze medal – third place	1912 Stockholm	12 metre class

Max Ferdinand Alfthan (February 11, 1892 – May 30, 1960) was a Finnish sailor who competed in the 1912 Summer Olympics. He was a crew member of the Finnish boat Heatherbell, which won the bronze medal in the 12 metre class.
