= Dick Bergström =

Swedish sailor (1886–1952)

Olympic medal record

Men's Sailing
Silver medal – second place	1912 Stockholm	12 metre class

Dick Bergström (February 15, 1886 – August 17, 1952) was a Swedish sailor who competed in the 1912 Summer Olympics. He was a crew member of the Swedish boat Erna Signe, which won the silver medal in the 12 metre class. His brother is Kurt Bergström.
