= Jarl Hulldén =

Finnish sailor

Medal record

Sailing

Representing Finland

Olympic Games
Bronze medal – third place	1912 Stockholm	12 metre class

Jarl "Viking" Hulldén (December 26, 1885 – October 18, 1913) was a Finnish sailor who competed in the 1912 Summer Olympics. He was a crew member of the Finnish boat Heatherbell, which won the bronze medal in the 12 metre class.
