= Sigurd Juslén =

Finnish sailor

Olympic medal record

Men's Sailing
Bronze medal – third place	1912 Stockholm	12 metre class

Sigurd Ludvig Juslén (November 25, 1885 – April 4, 1954) was a Finnish sailor who competed in the 1912 Summer Olympics. He was a crew member of the Finnish boat Heatherbell, which won the bronze medal in the 12 metre class.
