= Sigurd Kander =

Swedish sailor

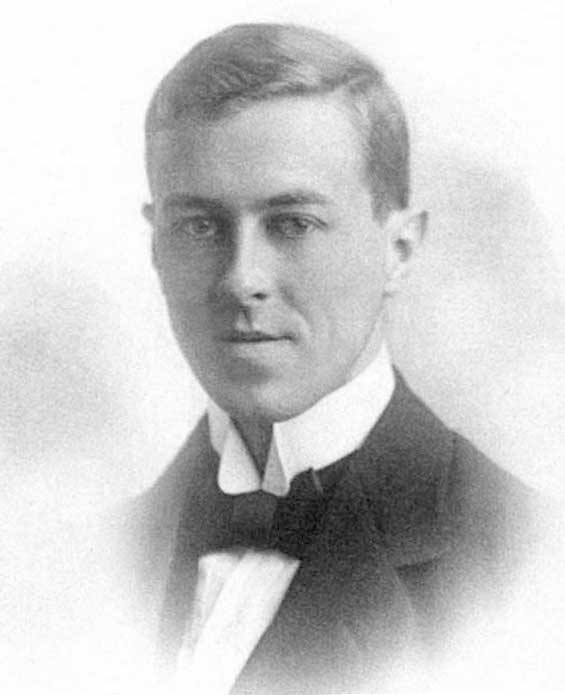

Personal information
- Born: 29 January 1890 Stockholm, Sweden
- Died: 30 April 1980 (aged 90) Stockholm, Sweden

Sailing career
- Sport: Sailing
- Club: Royal Swedish Yacht Club
Medal record
Representing Sweden
Olympic Games
Silver medal – second place	1912 Stockholm	12 m class

Gustaf Sigurd Vilhelm Kander (29 January 1890 – 30 April 1980) was a Swedish sailor. He was a crew member of the Swedish boat Erna Signe that won the silver medal in the 12 m class at the 1912 Summer Olympics.
