= Gunnar Månsson =

Swedish sailor

Gunnar "Gustaf" Månsson (1 March 1885 – 21 December 1976) was a Swedish sailor who competed in the 1912 Summer Olympics. He was a crew member of the Swedish boat R. S. Y. C., which finished fifth in the 8 metre class competition.
