= Alvar Thiel =

Swedish sailor

Olympic medal record

Men's Sailing
Silver medal – second place	1912 Stockholm	8 metre class

Alvar Thiel (23 February 1893 – 1 October 1973) was born in Farsta, Stockholm, Stockholm, Sweden. He is famous for being a Swedish sailor who competed in the 1912 Summer Olympics. He was a crew member of the Swedish boat Sans Atout, which won the silver medal in the 8 metre class.
