= Pekka Hartvall =

Finnish sailor

Olympic medal record

Men's Sailing
Bronze medal – third place	1912 Stockholm	12 metre class

Knut Erik "Pekka" Hartvall (18 February 1875 – 18 February 1939) was a Finnish sailor who competed in the 1912 Summer Olympics. He was a crew member of the Finnish boat Heatherbell, which won the bronze medal in the 12 metre class.
