= John Silén =

Finnish sailor

Medal record

Sailing

Representing Finland

Olympic Games
Bronze medal – third place	1912 Stockholm	12 metre class

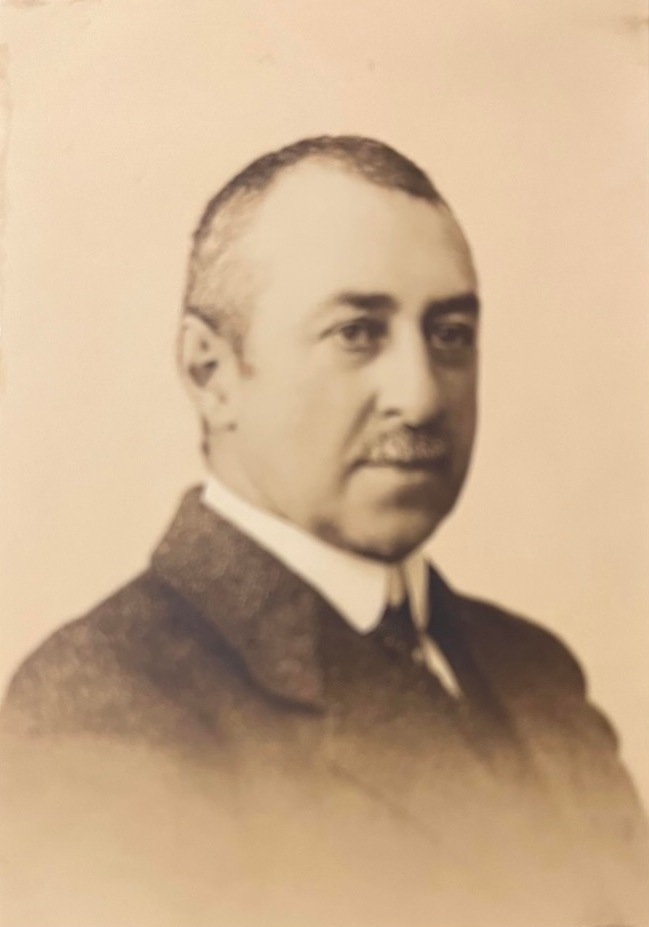
John Silén in 1925

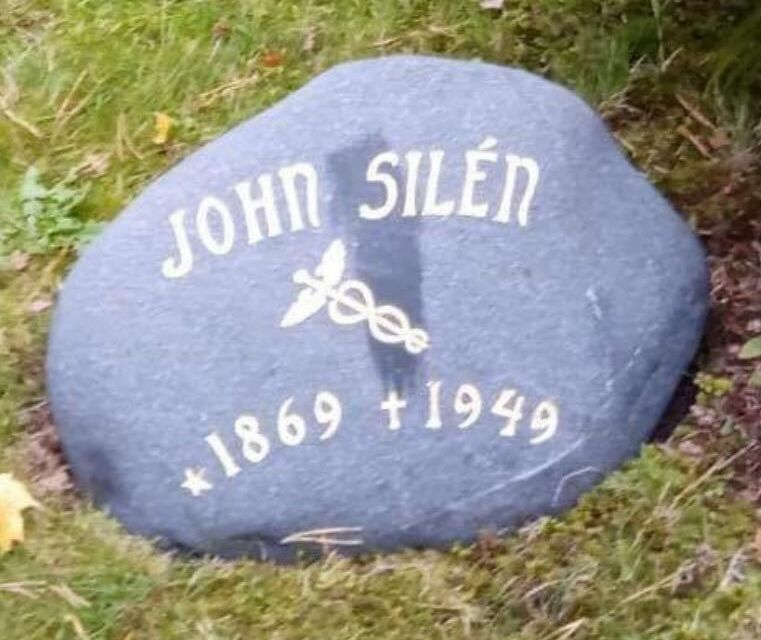
John Silén's gravestone in Turku

John Fredrik Silén (June 19, 1869, Turku – October 3, 1949, Helsinki) was a Finnish sailor who competed in the 1912 Summer Olympics. He was a crew member of the Finnish boat Heatherbell, which won the bronze medal in the 12 metre class.
