= Pavel Pavlov (sailor) =

Russian sailor

Personal information
- Full name: Pavel Pavlov
- Born: unknown
- Died: unknown

Sailing career
- Sport: Sailing
- Class: 8 Metre

Pavel Pavlov (Russian: Павел Васильевич Павлов) was a sailor from Russia, who represented his country at the 1912 Summer Olympics in Nynäshamn, Sweden in the 8 Metre.
