= Ragnar Gripe =

Swedish sailor

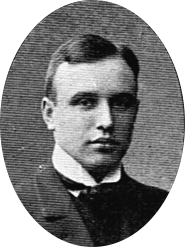
Ragnar Gripe

Ragnar Gripe (9 September 1883 – 8 December 1942) was a Swedish sailor who competed in the 1912 Summer Olympics. He was a crew member of the Swedish boat R. S. Y. C., which finished fifth in the 8 metre class competition.
