= Arnfinn Heje =

Norwegian sailor

Olympic medal record

Men's sailing

Representing Norway
Gold medal – first place	1912 Stockholm	12 metre class

Arnfinn Kolbjørn Heje (26 October 1877 – 29 January 1958) was a Norwegian sailor who competed in the 1912 Summer Olympics. He was a crew member of the Norwegian boat Magda IX, which won the gold medal in the 12 metre class.
