= Fritz Sjöqvist =

Swedish sailor

Fritz H. Sjöqvist (18 November 1884 – 26 April 1962) was a Swedish sailor who competed in the 1912 Summer Olympics. He was a crew member of the Swedish boat R.S.Y.C., which finished fifth in the 8 metre class competition. He was the twin brother of Arvid Sjöqvist.
