= Halfdan Hansen =

Norwegian sailor

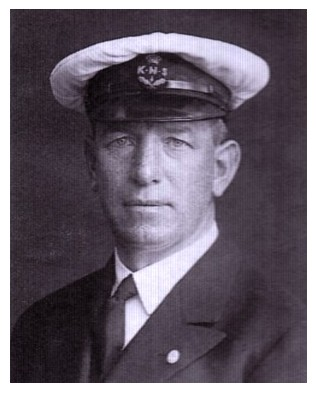
- Halfdan Hansen

Medal record

Men's sailing

Representing Norway

Summer Olympics
Gold medal – first place	1912 Stockholm	12 metre class

Halfdan Nicolai Hansen (October 16, 1883 – April 1, 1953) was a Norwegian sailor who competed in the 1912 Summer Olympics. He was a crew member of the Norwegian boat Magda IX, which won the gold medal in the 12 metre class.
