= Nils Persson (sailor) =

Swedish sailor

Olympic medal record

Men's Sailing
Silver medal – second place	1912 Stockholm	12 metre class

Nils Persson (February 11, 1879 – February 4, 1941) was a Swedish sailor who competed in the 1912 Summer Olympics. He was a crew member of the Swedish boat Erna Signe, which won the silver medal in the 12 metre class.
