= Eilert Falch-Lund =

Sailor and businessman (1875–1960)

Medal record

Sailing

Representing Norway

Olympic Games
Gold medal – first place	1912 Stockholm	12 Metre

Eilert Dietrichson Falch-Lund (27 January 1875 – 2 February 1960) was a Norwegian businessperson and sportsperson. As a yacht racer, he competed in the 1908 and 1912 Summer Olympics, winning one Olympic gold medal.

He was born in Kristiania. He finished Kristiania Commerce School in 1894 and worked in the offices of the companies Fr. Meyer from 1894 to 1904 and J. E. Mowinckel in Bergen from 1904 to 1905. He then stayed in England for a year. In 1914 he started his own company E. Falch-Lund in Tollbodgaten.

In 1908, he was part of the Norwegian Fram, which finished fourth in the 8 metre class competition. Four years later, he was a crew member of the Norwegian boat Magda IX, which won the gold medal in the 12 metre class. He represented the clubs Royal Norwegian Yacht Club and Bergen SF. He was also a co-founder of the skiing club SK Ondur in 1891, and was a member of Oslo Rotary Klub.

He died in February 1960 and was buried in Vestre gravlund.
