= Christian Staib =

Norwegian sailor

Olympic medal record

Men's sailing

Representing Norway
Gold medal – first place	1912 Stockholm	12 metre class

Christian Fredrik Maximilian "Fritz" Staib (February 10, 1892 – May 16, 1956) was a Norwegian sailor who competed in the 1912 Summer Olympics. He was a crew member of the Norwegian boat Magda IX, which won the gold medal in the 12 metre class.
