= Hugo Clason =

Swedish sailor (1865–1935)

Olympic medal record

Men's Sailing
Silver medal – second place	1912 Stockholm	12 metre class

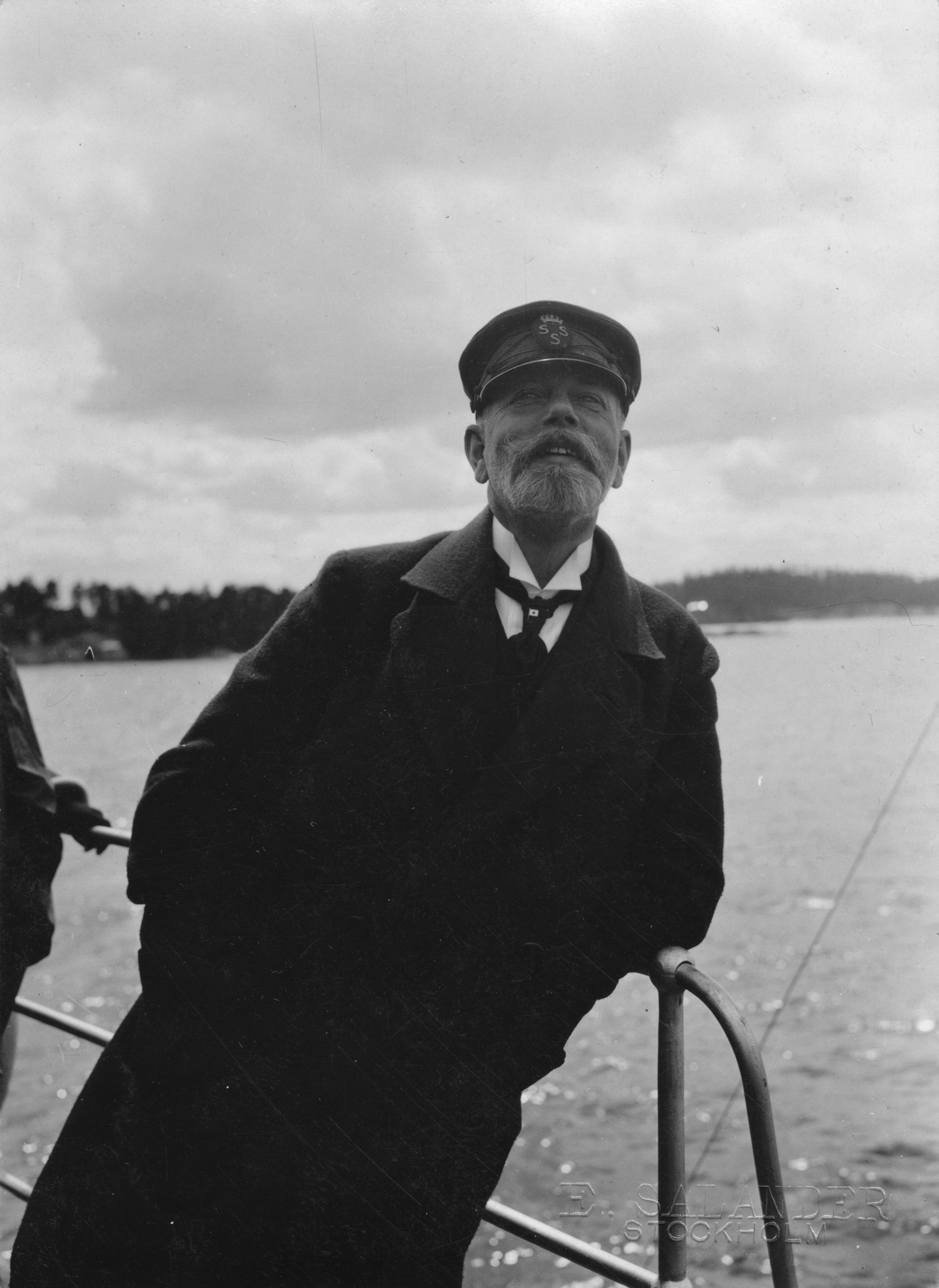
Hugo Clason

Hugo Clason (June 2, 1865 – January 21, 1935) was a Swedish sailor who competed in the 1912 Summer Olympics. He was a crew member of the Swedish boat Erna Signe, which won the silver medal in the 12 metre class.
