= Petter Larsen =

Norwegian sailor

Olympic medal record

Men's sailing

Representing Norway
Gold medal – first place	1912 Stockholm	12 metre class

Petter Andreas Larsen (December 6, 1890- September 13, 1946) was a Norwegian sailor who competed in the 1912 Summer Olympics. He was a crew member of the Norwegian boat Magda IX, which won the gold medal in the 12 metre class.
