= Arvid Sjöqvist =

Swedish sailor

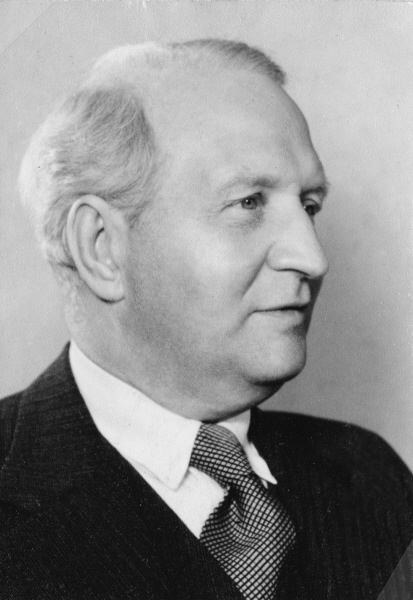
Arvid Sjöqvist 1884-1960

Johan Arvid Sjöqvist (18 November 1884 – 22 March 1960) was a Swedish sailor who competed in the 1912 Summer Olympics. He was a crew member of the Swedish boat R.S.Y.C., which finished fifth in the 8 metre class competition. He was the twin brother of Fritz Sjöqvist.
