= Carl Thaulow =

Norwegian sailor

Olympic medal record

Men's sailing

Representing Norway
Gold medal – first place	1912 Stockholm	12 metre class

Carl Gustav Thaulow (October 23, 1875 – May 30, 1942) was a Norwegian sailor who competed in the 1912 Summer Olympics. He was a crew member of the Norwegian boat Magda IX, which won the gold medal in the 12 metre class.

Carl Thaulow was the son of a physician, Johan Fredrik Thaulow.
