= Alfred Larsen (sailor) =

Norwegian sailor

Alfred Waldemar Garmann Larsen
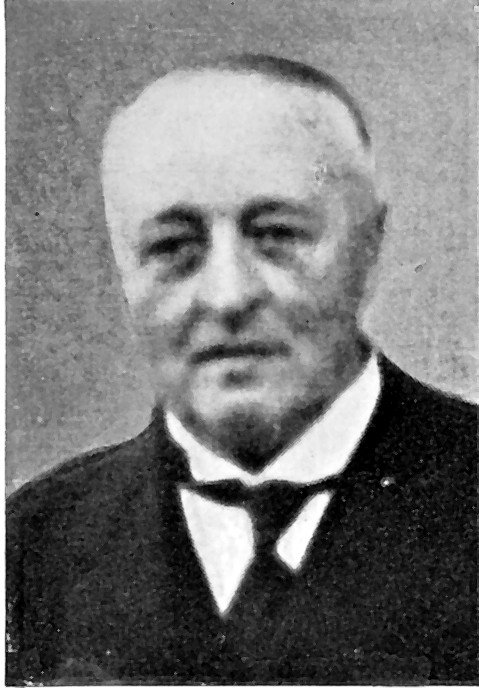
- Born: 24 November 1863; Oslo, Norway
- Died: 10 September 1950 (aged 86)
- Occupation: businessman
- Awards: Order of St. Olav; Order of the Immaculate Conception of Vila Viçosa

Olympic medal record

Men's sailing

Representing Norway
Gold medal – first place	1912 Stockholm	12 metre class

Alfred Waldemar Garmann Larsen (24 November 1863 – 10 September 1950) was a Norwegian businessman and sailor who competed in the 1912 Summer Olympics. He was a crew member of the Norwegian boat Magda IX, which won the gold medal in the 12 metre class.

== Business career ==
Larsen took over a family company which became one of Norway's leading importers of wines and liquors. He was decorated Knight of the Order of St. Olav in 1912.
