= Arne Settergren =

Swedish sailor (born 1935)

Arne Settergren (born 17 March 1935) is a Swedish former sailor who competed in the 1964 Summer Olympics.
