= Erna Signe =

Yacht

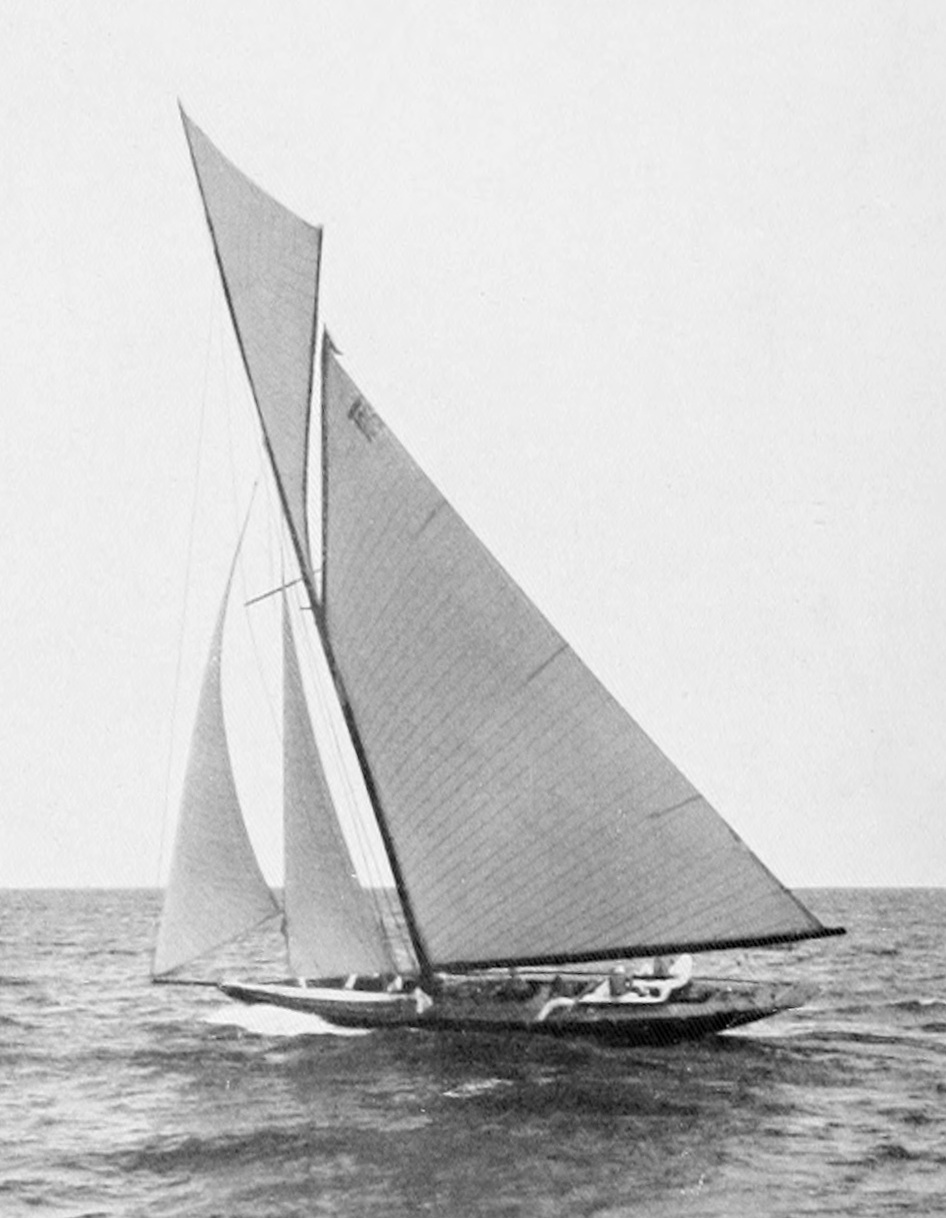
- Erna Signe in 1912.
- Nation: Sweden
- Class: 12-metre
- Sail no: E8
- Designer(s): William Fife III
- Builder: August Plym, Neglingevarvet; Stockholm, Sweden
- Launched: June 1911

Racing career
- Skippers: Nils Persson
- Olympics: 1912

Specifications
- Displacement: 28,000 kg (62,000 lb)
- Length: 18.9 m (62 ft) (LOA); 11.94 m (39.2 ft) (LWL)
- Beam: 3.43 m (11.3 ft)
- Draft: 2.50 m (8 ft 2 in)
- Sail area: 250 m^{2} (2,700 sq ft)

Erna Signe is a 1911 Swedish 12 metre class yacht. It was by designed by William Fife III and built by August Plym at Neglingevarvet.

== Career ==
Erna Signe was launched in June 1911. Erna Signe competed in the 1912 Summer Olympics, helmed by Nils Persson with the crew Per Bergman, Dick Bergström, Kurt Bergström, Hugo Clason, Folke Johnson, Sigurd Kander, Nils Lamby, Erik Lindqvist, and Richard Sällström, finishing second behind Johan Anker's Magda IX.

In 1913, Axel Nygren re-designed the rig.
