= Folke Johnson =

Swedish sailor

Olympic medal record

Men's Sailing
Silver medal – second place	1912 Stockholm	12 metre class

Folke Johnson (June 15, 1887 – February 20, 1962) was a Swedish sailor who competed in the 1912 Summer Olympics. He was a crew member of the Swedish boat Erna Signe, which won the silver medal in the 12 metre class.
