= Eino Sandelin =

Finnish sailor

Olympic medal record

Men's Sailing
Bronze medal – third place	1912 Stockholm	12 metre class

Eino Kauno Sandelin (December 16, 1864 – October 15, 1937) was a Finnish sailor who competed in the 1912 Summer Olympics. He was a crew member of the Finnish boat Heatherbell, which won the bronze medal in the 12 metre class.
