= Kurt Bergström =

Sailor and physician

Olympic medal record

Men's Sailing
Silver medal – second place	1912 Stockholm	12 metre class

Kurt J. Bergström (23 July 1891 – 20 November 1955) was a Swedish sailor who competed in the 1912 Summer Olympics. He was a crew member of the Swedish boat Erna Signe, which won the silver medal in the 12 metre class at the 1912 Olympics. His brother Dick Bergström was also a crew member.

Kurt was an MD and worked as a physician in Jönköping, Sweden.

== Family ==
He was married to Inga Märta Eleonora Bergström, born Andersson. Inga and Kurt had three daughters: Marianne (1933), Marguerite (1936), and Inga-Brita (1937). All his daughters eventually married and had children, but Kurt died before these events, and therefore, he never met his grandchildren.

== Death ==
On the morning of 20 November 1955, Kurt felt ill and went to see his face in the mirror in his own bedroom. There, he diagnosed himself with a cerebral haemorrhage as half his face was paralyzed. He died peacefully in hospital later that day.

Kurt Bergström

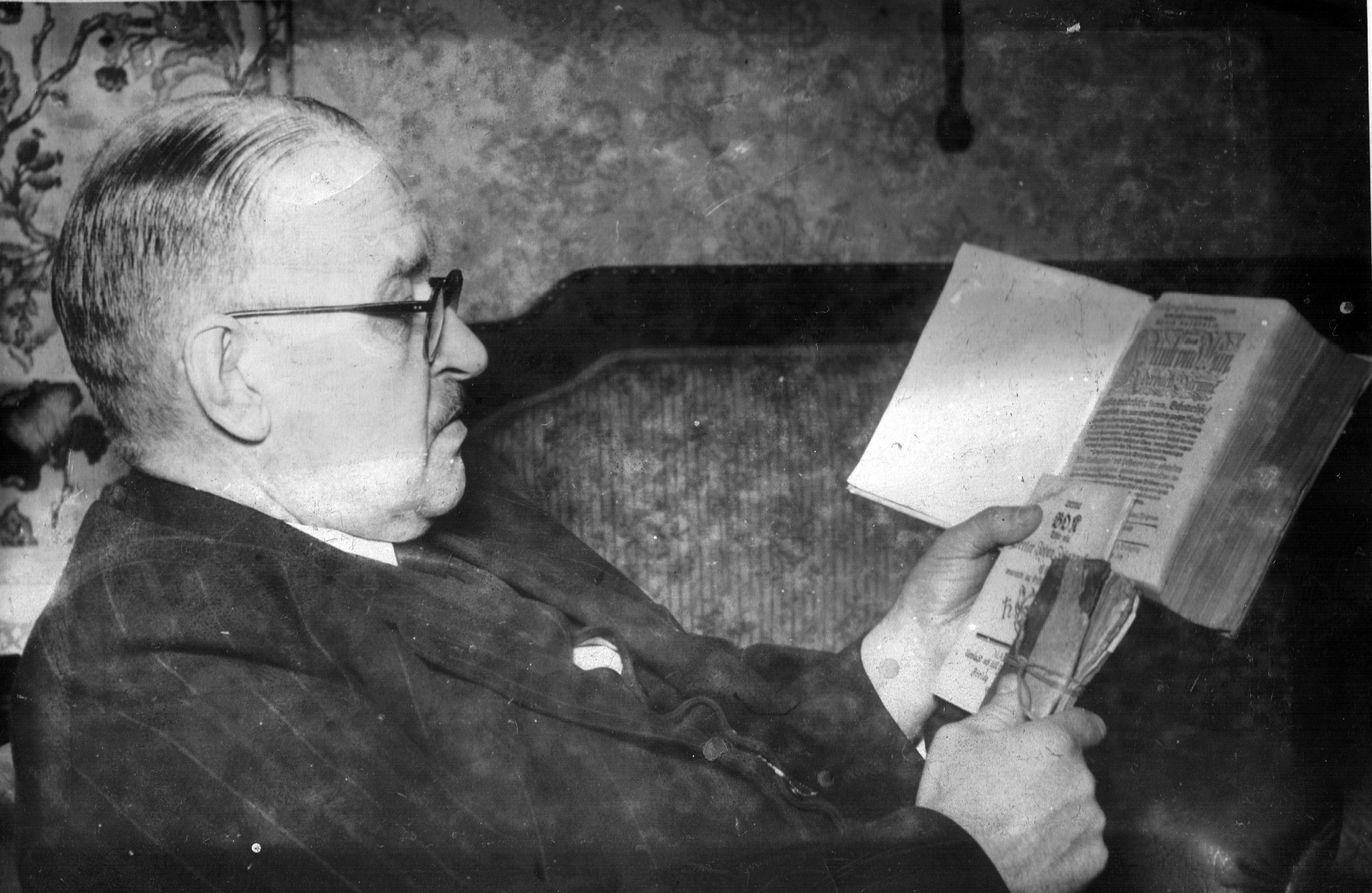
Kurt Bergström

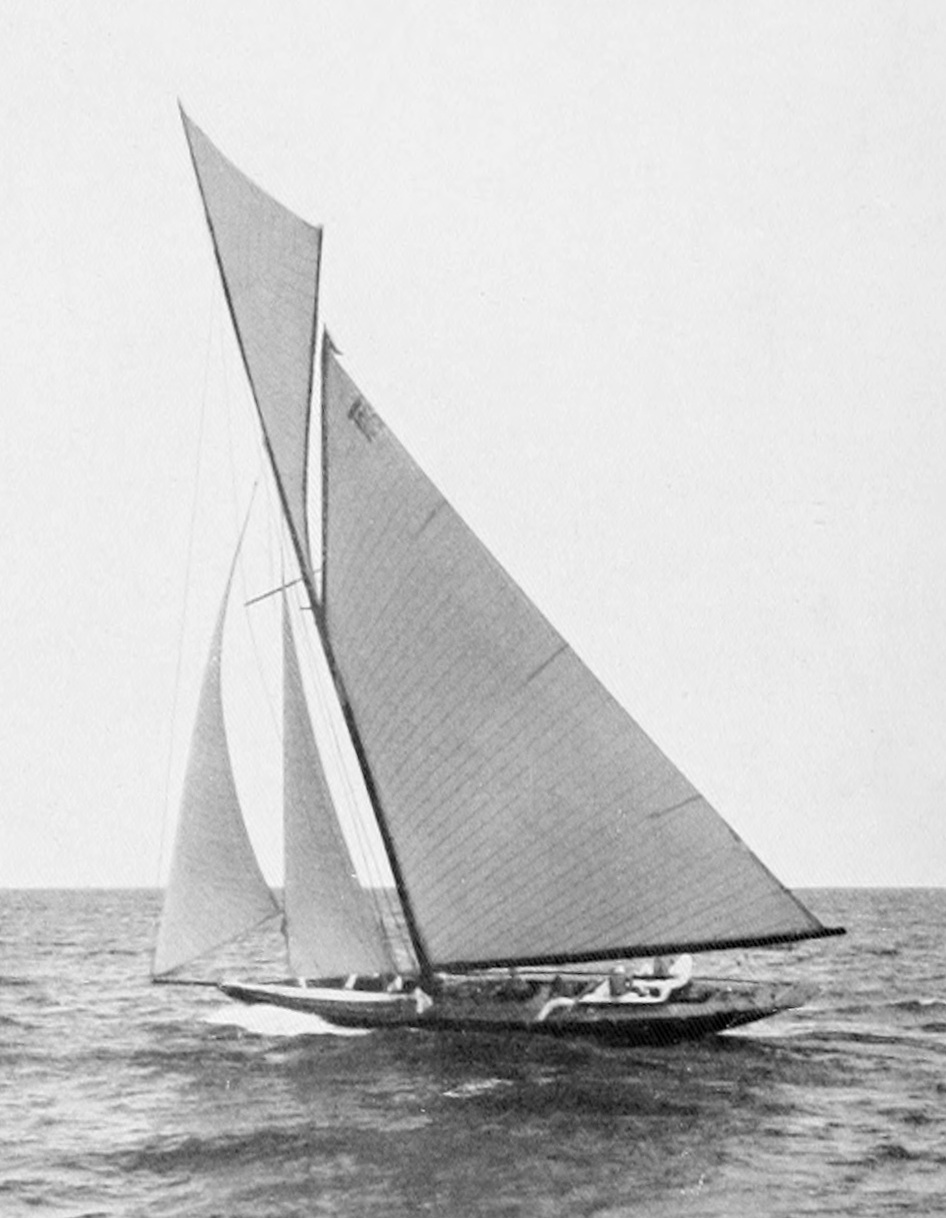
Erna Signe
