= Hugo Sällström =

Swedish sailor

Medal record

Sailing

Representing Sweden

Olympic Games
Silver medal – second place	1912 Stockholm	12 metre class

Richard Hugo Sällström (December 15, 1870 – February 19, 1951) was a Swedish sailor who competed in the 1912 Summer Olympics. He was a crew member of the Swedish boat Erna Signe, which won the silver medal in the 12 metre class.
