= Ernst Krogius =

Finnish lawyer, shipowner and sailor

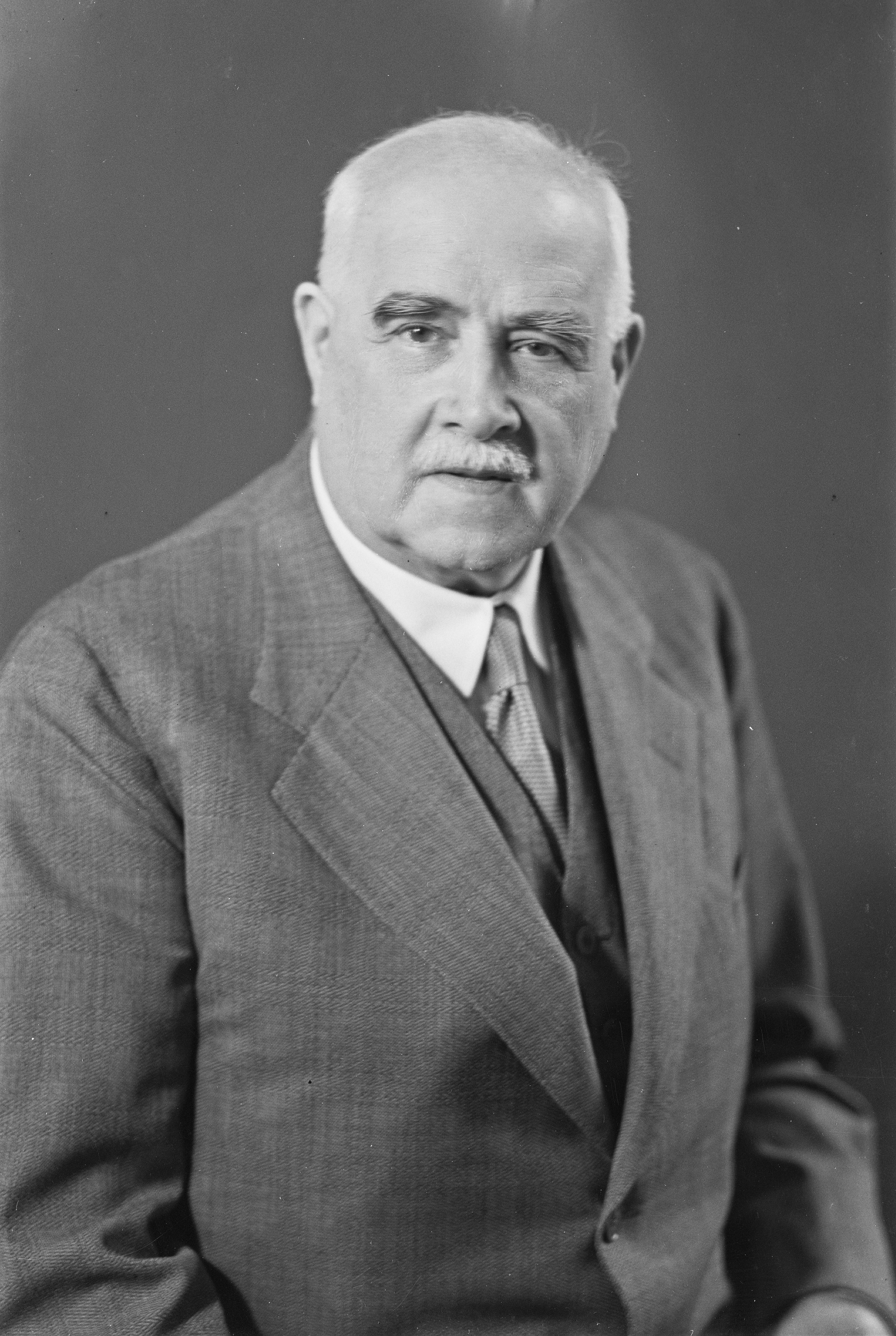

Medal record

Men's Sailing
Bronze medal – third place	1912 Stockholm	12 metre class

Ernst Edvard Krogius (Helsinki, 6 June 1865 – Copenhagen, 21 September 1955) was a Finnish lawyer, shipowner and sailor who competed in the 1912 Summer Olympics. He was a crew member of the Finnish boat Heatherbell, which won the bronze medal in the 12 meter class.
