= Sailing at the 1908 Summer Olympics =

Sailing at the Games of the IV Olympiad
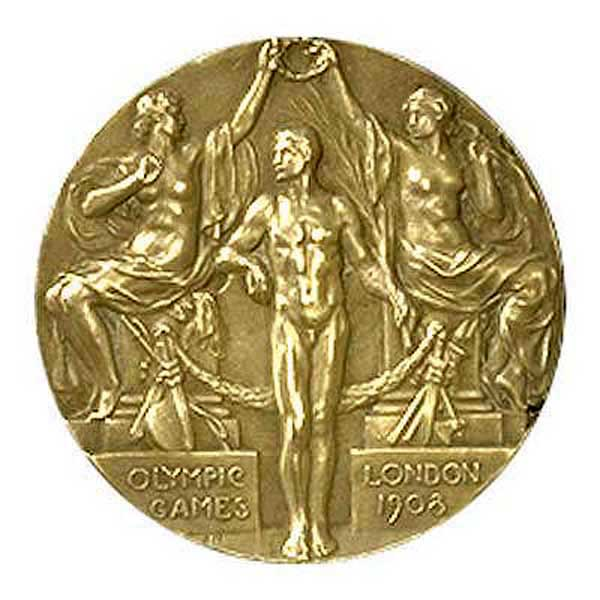
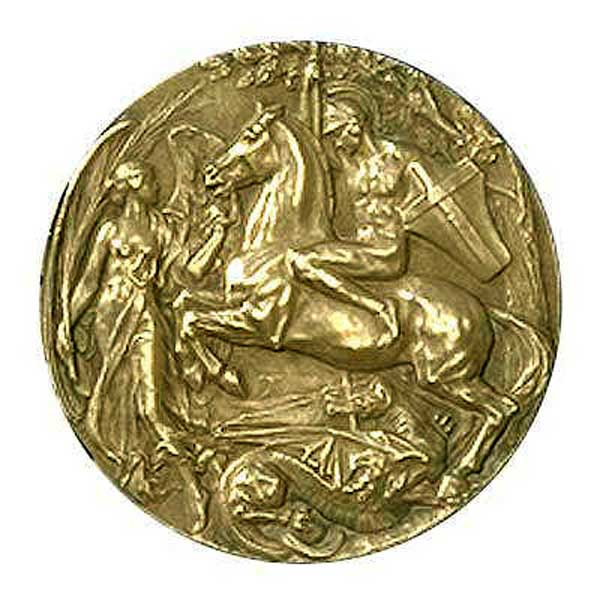
- 1908 Gold Medal (Obverse and Reverse)
- Venues: Ryde, Isle of Wight; Hunters Quay, Scotland
- Dates: First race: 27 July 1908 (Ryde); Last race: 29 July 1908; First race: 11 August 1908 (Hunters Quay); Last race: 12 August 1908
- Competitors: 64 Male and 2 Female (Documented) from 5 nations
- Boats: 14

Sailing/Yachting is an Olympic sport starting from the Games of the 1st Olympiad (1896 Olympics in Athens, Greece). With the exception of the 1904 and the canceled 1916 Summer Olympics, sailing has always been included on the Olympic schedule. The Sailing program of 1908 was open for a total of five sailing classes (disciplines), but actually only four Sailing events were contested. The planned venue of all races, named matches, was Ryde, Isle of Wight.

== Venue ==
Royal Victoria Yacht Club
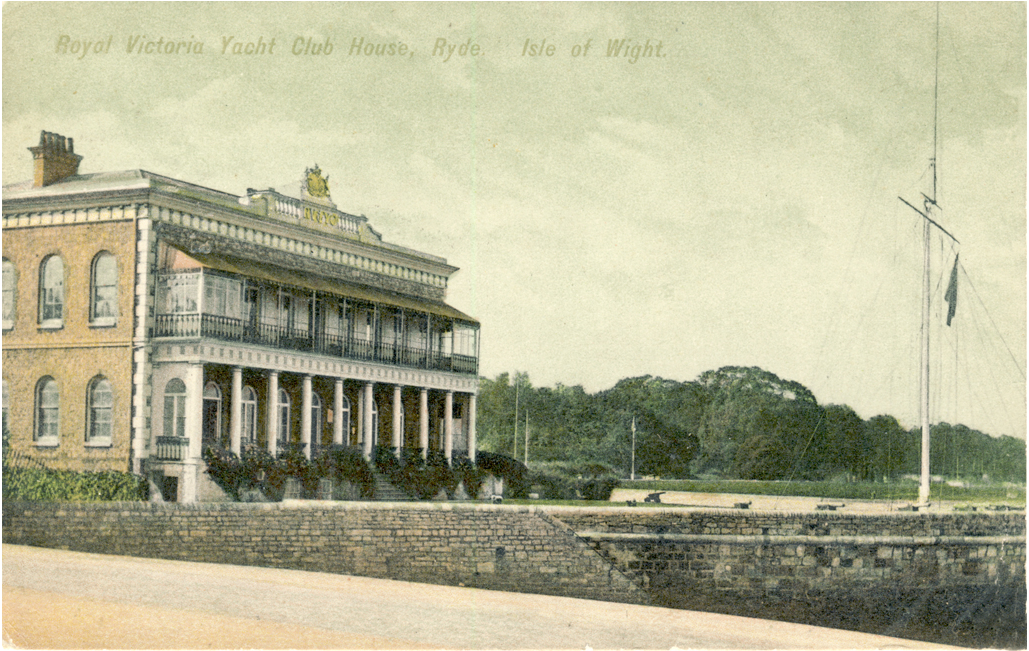
- Clubhouse of the Royal Victoria Yacht Club, Ryde, 1909
- Interactive map of the Royal Victoria Yacht Club area

General information
- Status: Completed
- Type: Clubhouse
- Location: Ryde, GBR
- Coordinates: 50°43′58.92″N 1°9′44.91″W
- Elevation: Sealevel
- Construction started: 1846
- Client: Royal Victoria Yacht Club
- Owner: Prince Consort Building

Design and construction
- Architect: Italianate style Regency architecture

Royal Clyde Yacht Clubhouse
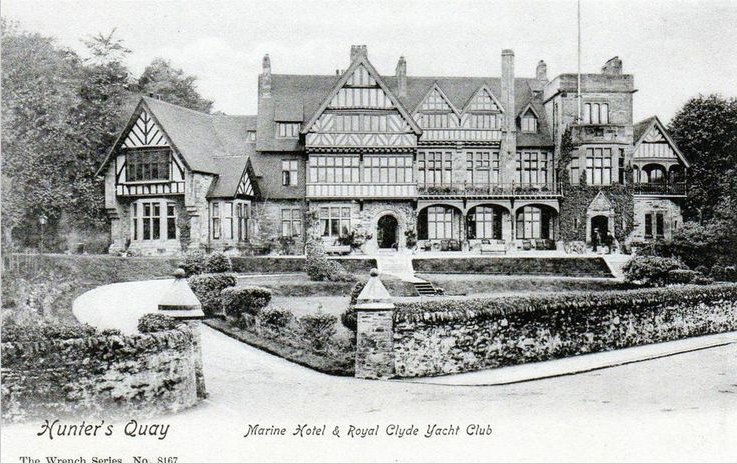
- The Clubhouse of the Royal Clyde Yacht Club Clyde at Hunter’s Quay (GBR) was made available for the Organizing Committee of the B.O.C. and the Clyde Corinthian Yacht Club for the 12 Metre Matches.
- Interactive map of the Royal Clyde Yacht Clubhouse area

General information
- Status: Completed
- Type: Hotel & Clubhouse
- Location: Hunters Quay, GBR
- Coordinates: 55°58′11.31″N 4°54′31.78″W
- Elevation: Sealevel

At the 1907 The Hague Conference of the IOC Ryde at the Isle of Wight was appointed to host the sailing regattas, for all classes, of the games of the IVth Olympiad. However, when there were only two British entries for the 12 Metre matches, and both yacht were located at the Firth of Clyde, the decision was made to use Hunters Quay as a second venue.

=== Royal Victoria Yacht Club, Ryde ===
The RVYC was founded on 24 May 1845 by Prince Albert to give Queen Victoria a Yacht Club which she was entitled to enter as a mere female!

For the Olympic matches the race committee used the available shipping buoys as marks for the courses. for the classes the following course lengths were used:

- 6 Metre: 13 nautical miles (24 km)
- 7 Metre: 13 nautical miles (24 km)
- 8 Metre: 16 nautical miles (30 km)

=== Clyde Corinthian Yacht Club, Hunters Quay ===
- 12 Metre: 26 nautical miles (48 km)

=== Course areas ===
The following course areas were used during the 1908 Olympic sailing regattas:

1908 Olympic Course Areas

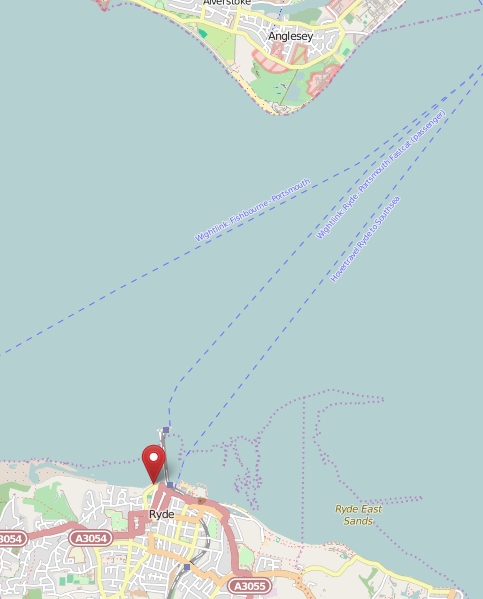
Olympic Course Area for the 6 & 7 Metre, Ryde

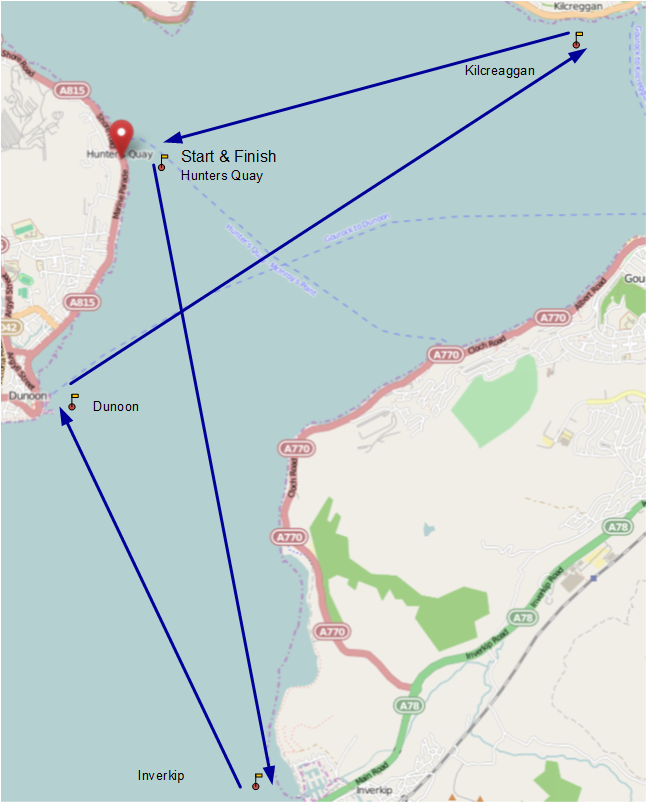
Olympic 12 Metre Course, Hunters Quay

== Competition ==
=== Overview ===
Continents	Countries	Classes	Entries	Male	Female
1	5	5	14	64	2

A maximum of 2 boats per country per class was allowed.

=== Continents ===
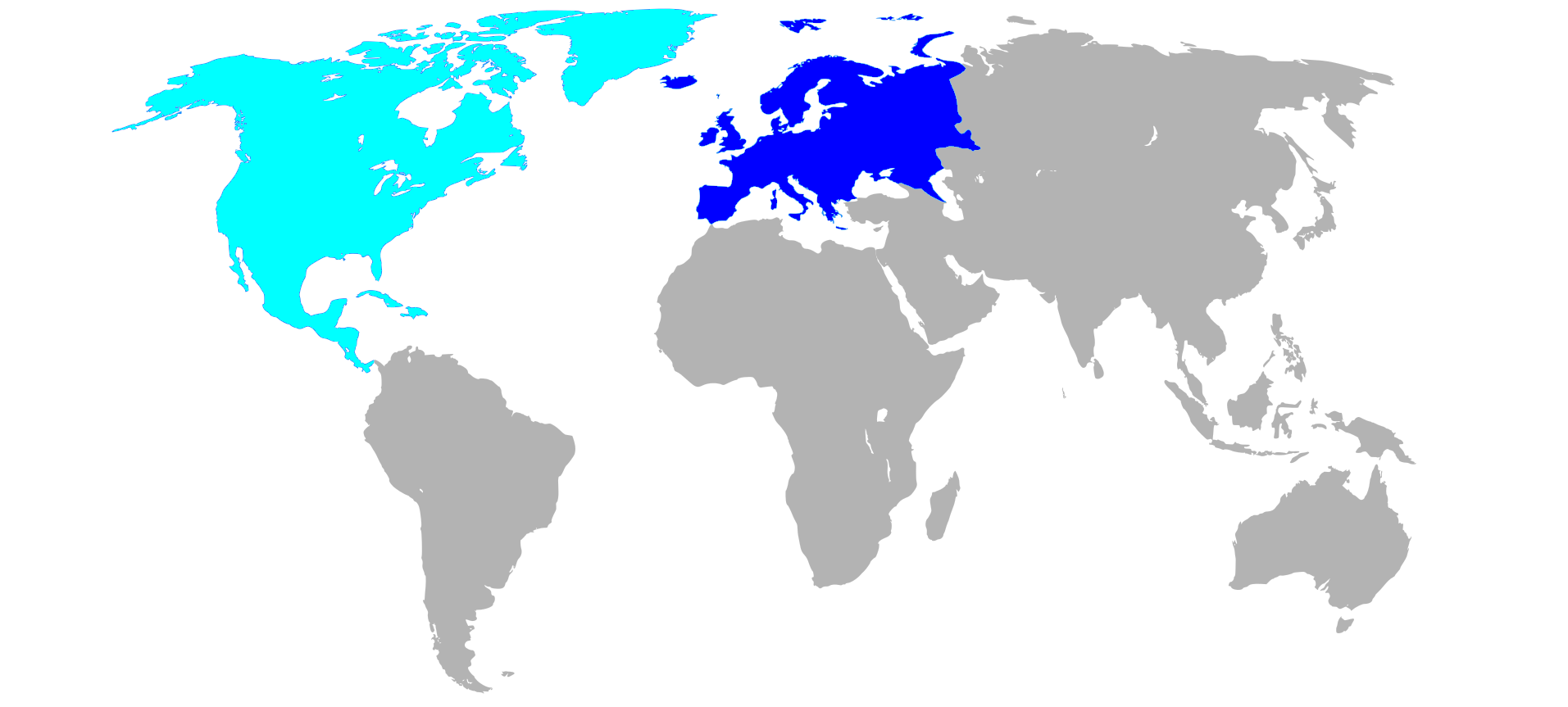
Map of Participating Sailing Continents at the 1908 Summer Olympics ● Green = Participating for the first time ● Blue = Participating ● Light Blue = Have previously participated

● Europe

=== Countries ===
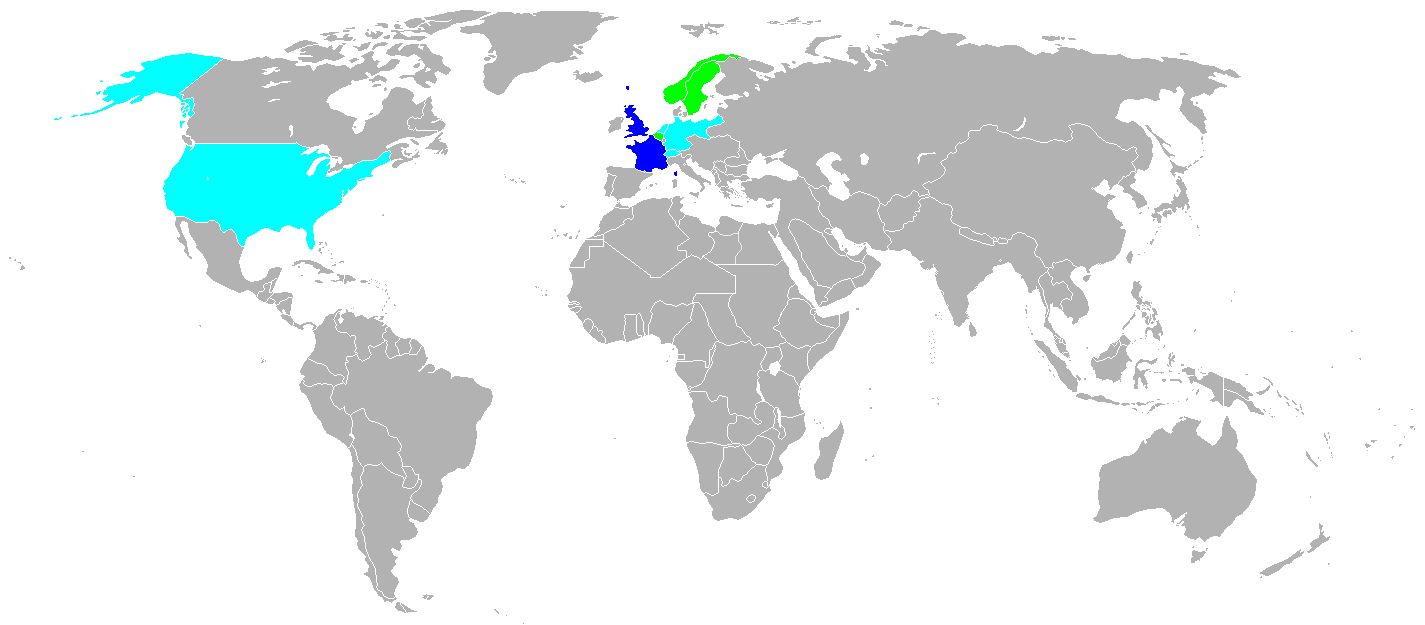
Map of Participating Sailing Countries at the 1908 Summer Olympics ● Green = Participating for the first time ● Blue = Participating ● Light Blue = Have previously participated

- Belgium (3)
- France (3)
- Great Britain (45)
- Norway (5)
- Sweden (13)

=== Classes (equipment) ===
Source: Although one of the oldest organized sporting activities, sailing in the early first part of the 20th century was not uniformly organized. This had a lot to do with national traditions as well as with the fact that there were no standardized boat types with uniform building instructions and measurements. Also a lot of development was done in the area of boat design and boat building. The shape of a boat, specifically its length, its weight and its sail area, are major parameters that determine the boat's speed. Several initiatives were started to create a formula that made it possible to have boats race each other without having to calculate the final result. But the different countries initially could not agree on an international system. At the Olympics of 1900 it was clear that sailing was not ready for international competition, and something had to be done.

In 1906 international meetings were organize to solve the problem. Finally in Paris, October 1907 the first International Rule was ratified. Delegates from this meeting went on to form the International Yacht Racing Union (IYRU), the precursor to the present International Sailing Federation (ISAF).

The agreed formula gives a result in meters (Metre). During the meeting in 1907 the IOC made the decision to open the 1908 Summer Olympics for the following Metre classes:

Class	Type	Venue	Event	Sailors	First OG	Olympics so far
6 Metre	Keelboat	Ryde		3	1908	1
7 Metre	Keelboat	Ryde		4	1908	1
8 Metre	Keelboat	Ryde		5	1908	1
12 Metre	Keelboat	Hunters Quay		10	1908	1
15 Metre	Keelboat	No show		Unknown	1908	0
Legend: = Mixed gender event
The 1908 Olympic Classes in action 6 Metre 7 Metre 8 Metre 12 Metre

== Race schedule ==
●	Event competitions	●	Event finals

Date	July					August											
Date	27 Mon	28 Tue	29 Wed	30 Thu	31 Fri	1 Sat	2 Sun	3 Mon	4 Tue	5 Wed	6 Thu	7 Fri	8 Sat	9 Sun	10 Mon	11 Tue	12 Wed
Sailing	● ● ●	● ● ●	● ● ●													●	●
Total gold medals			3														1

== Medal summary ==
Event	Gold	Silver	Bronze
1908: 6 Metre	Great Britain (GBR); Gilbert Laws; Thomas McMeekin; Charles Crichton	Belgium (BEL); Léon Huybrechts; Louis Huybrechts; Henri Weewauters	France (FRA); Henri Arthus; Louis Potheau; Pierre Rabot
1908: 7 Metre	Great Britain (GBR); Charles Rivett-Carnac; Norman Bingley; Richard Dixon; Frances Rivett-Carnac	The second competitor failed to make it to the start.	No further competition
1908: 8 Metre	Great Britain (GBR); Blair Cochrane; Charles Campbell; John Rhodes; Henry Sutton; Arthur Wood	Sweden (SWE); Carl Hellström; Edmund Thormählen; Eric Sandberg; Erik Wallerius; Harald Wallin	Great Britain (GBR); Philip Hunloke; Alfred Hughes; Frederick Hughes; George Ratsey; William Ward; The Duchess of Westminster
1908: 12 Metre	Great Britain (GBR); T. C. Glen-Coats (helmsman); J. H. Downes (mate); J. S. Aspin; John Buchanan; J. C. Bunten; A. D. Downes; David Dunlop; John Mackenzie; Albert Martin; Gerald Tait	Great Britain (GBR); C. MacIver (helmsman); J. G. Kenion (mate); J. M. Adam; James Baxter; W. P. Davidson; J. F. Jellico; T. A. R. Littledale; C. R. MacIver; C. Macleod Robertson; J. F. D. Spence	No further competition

== Medal table ==
Rank	Nation	Gold	Silver	Bronze	Total
1	Great Britain	4	1	1	6
2	Belgium	0	1	0	1
2	Sweden	0	1	0	1
4	France	0	0	1	1
Totals (4 entries)		4	3	2	9

== Notes ==
- This Olympic sailing event was gender independent, however only two women, Frances Rivett-Carnac in the 7 Metre, and the Duchess of Westminster as extra on her 8 Metre, participated. The duchess of Westminster also distributed the diplomas of special merit to the competitors of the other Olympic sports on 25 July 1908. Gender specific events however had to wait until 1988.
- The matches at Ryde were held in light air conditions.
- All members of a team had to be a citizen of the country they represent. However the boats used did not have to be built in the same country that the team was representing since the Olympic games are considered a test of skills and handling for the team and not a test of the yacht. This in contrast with the matches for the America's Cup of that time.
- A second 7 Metre yacht Mignonette was entered under command of Capt. R. Sloane-Stanley but failed to make it to the starting line.
- At the end of the official report the following suggestion was made:
  It has been suggested that in the yacht racing of future Olympic Games it might be better to select a fleet of "one-design" boats in the waters where the Games are held, and let all the crews entered draw lots for them every day, with the proviso that no crew should have the same boat twice.
  Sailing had to wait until 1920 before the first "one-design" class was selected for the Games.

== Other information ==
During the Sailing regattas at the 1908 Summer Olympics among others the following persons were competing in the various classes:

- Norway, Johan Anker, Multiple Olympic competitor and designer of many Metre yachts as well as the 1948 Olympic Dragon, in the 8 Metre Fram
- Great Britain, Duchess of Westminster as owner and extra crewmember of the 8 Metre Sorais
- Great Britain, William Dudley Ward in the 8 Metre Sorais
- Sweden, Harald Wallin in Vinga
People at the 1908 Olympic regattas
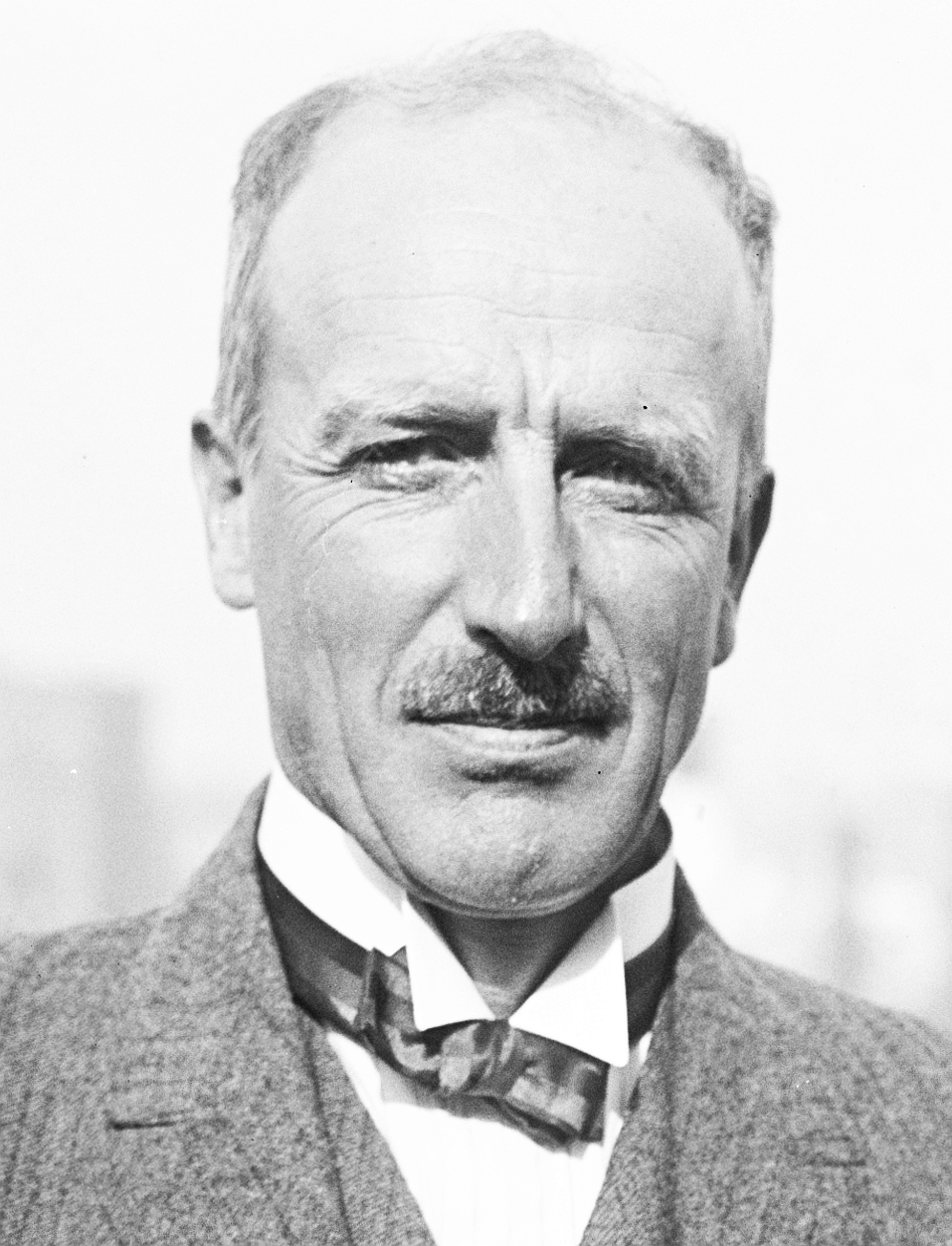
Johan Anker

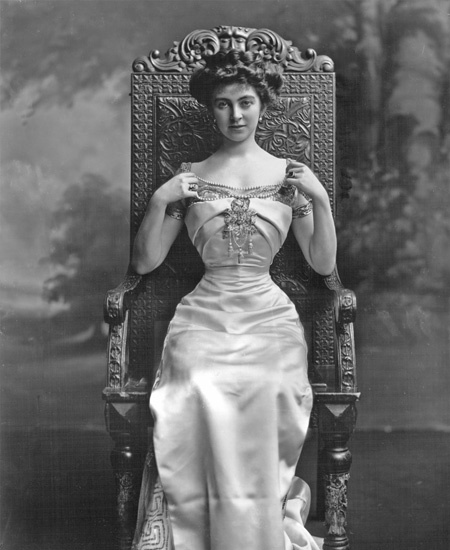
Duchess of Westminster

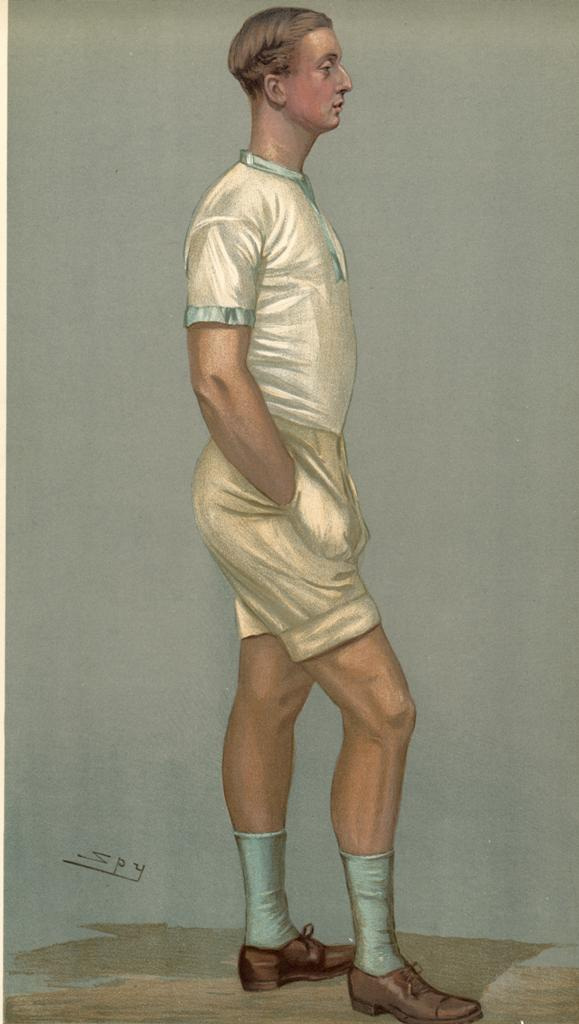
William Dudley Ward

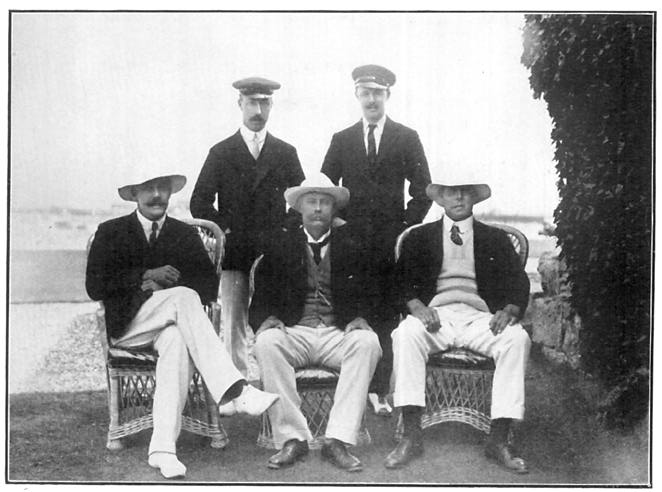
Crew of Cobweb

Race committee of the Clyde Corinthian Yacht Club
