= List of Scottish Olympic medallists =

Scotland competes at the Olympic Games as part of the United Kingdom. This article provides a list of medallists for Great Britain at every Summer and Winter Olympics who are Scottish, as well as teams where at least one member was Scottish.

== List of Summer Olympic medallists ==
=== 1896 Athens ===
Medal	Name	Sport	Event
Gold	Launceston Elliot	Weightlifting	Men's one hand lift
Silver	Launceston Elliot	Weightlifting	Men's two hand lift

=== 1900 Paris ===
Medal	Name	Sport	Event
Gold	Lorne Currie	Sailing	Open class
Gold	Lorne Currie	Sailing	.5 to 1 ton
Gold	Peter Kemp	Water polo	Team competition
Silver	Walter Rutherford	Golf	Men's individual
Bronze	David Robertson	Golf	Men's individual
Bronze	Peter Kemp	Swimming	Men's 200 metre obstacle event
Bronze	Archibald Warden	Tennis	Mixed doubles

=== 1904 St. Louis ===
Great Britain did not send a team to the 1904 Summer Olympics in St. Louis.

=== 1908 London ===
Medal	Name	Sport	Event
Gold	Arthur Robertson	Athletics	Men's 3 miles team race
Gold	Wyndham Halswelle	Athletics	Men's 400 metres
Gold	James Angus Gillan	Rowing	Men's coxless four
Gold	T. C. Glen-Coats	Sailing	12 Metre
Gold	John Downes	Sailing	12 Metre
Gold	John Aspin	Sailing	12 Metre
Gold	John Buchanan	Sailing	12 Metre
Gold	James Bunten	Sailing	12 Metre
Gold	Arthur Downes	Sailing	12 Metre
Gold	David Dunlop	Sailing	12 Metre
Gold	John Mackenzie	Sailing	12 Metre
Gold	Albert Martin	Sailing	12 Metre
Gold	Gerald Tait	Sailing	12 Metre
Gold	George Cornet	Water Polo	Team competition
Silver	Arthur Robertson	Athletics	Men's 3200 metres steeplechase
Silver	Alex McCulloch	Rowing	Men's single sculls
Silver	John Martin	Shooting	Men's military rifle, team
Silver	Harcourt Ommundsen	Shooting	Men's military rifle, team
Silver	Ted Ranken	Shooting	Men's single-shot running deer
Silver	Ted Ranken	Shooting	Men's double-shot running deer
Silver	Ted Ranken	Shooting	Men's team single-shot running deer
Silver	William Robinson	Swimming	Men's 200 metre breaststroke
Bronze	Hugh Roddin	Boxing	Featherweight
Bronze	Alexander Burt	Field hockey	Team
Bronze	John Burt	Field hockey	Team
Bronze	Alastair Denniston	Field hockey	Team
Bronze	Charles Foulkes	Field hockey	Team
Bronze	Hew Fraser	Field hockey	Team
Bronze	James Harper-Orr	Field hockey	Team
Bronze	Ivan Laing	Field hockey	Team
Bronze	Hugh Neilson	Field hockey	Team
Bronze	Gordon Orchardson	Field hockey	Team
Bronze	Norman Stevenson	Field hockey	Team
Bronze	Hugh Walker	Field hockey	Team

=== 1912 Stockholm ===
Medal	Name	Sport	Event
Gold	Henry Macintosh	Athletics	Men's 4 × 100 metres relay
Gold	Philip Fleming	Rowing	Men's eight
Gold	James Angus Gillan	Rowing	Men's eight
Gold	Wally Kinnear	Rowing	Men's single sculls
Gold	Robert Murray	Shooting	Men's 50 metre team small-bore rifle
Gold	Isabella Moore	Swimming	Women's 4 × 100 metre freestyle relay
Gold	George Cornet	Water Polo	Team competition
Silver	Thomas Gillespie	Rowing	Men's eight
Silver	Frederick Pitman	Rowing	Men's eight
Silver	William Milne	Shooting	Men's 50 metre rifle prone
Silver	William Milne	Shooting	Men's 25 metre team small-bore rifle
Silver	Harcourt Ommundsen	Shooting	Men's team rifle
Silver	James Reid	Shooting	Men's team rifle
Silver	Alexander Munro	Tug of war	Team
Silver	John Sewell	Tug of war	Team
Bronze	James Soutter	Athletics	Men's 4 × 400 metres relay

=== 1920 Antwerp ===
Medal	Name	Sport	Event
Gold	Robert Lindsay	Athletics	Men's 4 × 400 metres relay
Gold	John Sewell	Tug of war	Team
Gold	William Peacock	Water polo	Team
Silver	James Wilson	Athletics	Men's team cross country
Silver	Alexander Ireland	Boxing	Welterweight
Silver	William Stewart	Cycling	Men's team pursuit
Bronze	James Wilson	Athletics	Men's 10,000 metres
Bronze	George McKenzie	Boxing	Bantamweight
Bronze	William Cuthbertson	Boxing	Flyweight

=== 1924 Paris ===
Medal	Name	Sport	Event
Gold	Eric Liddell	Athletics	Men's 400 metres
Gold	James MacNabb	Rowing	Men's coxless four
Silver	James McKenzie	Boxing	Flyweight
Bronze	Eric Liddell	Athletics	Men's 200 metres
Bronze	Archie MacDonald	Wrestling	Men's freestyle heavyweight

=== 1928 Amsterdam ===
Medal	Name	Sport	Event
Silver	Jamie Hamilton	Rowing	Men's eight
Silver	Ellen King	Swimming	Women's 100 metre backstroke
Silver	Ellen King	Swimming	Women's 4 × 100 metre freestyle relay
Silver	Sarah Stewart	Swimming	Women's 4 × 100 metre freestyle relay

=== 1936 Berlin ===
Medal	Name	Sport	Event
Silver	Robert Hinde	Polo	Team competition
Bronze	Edward Howard-Vyse	Equestrian	Team eventing

=== 1948 London ===
Medal	Name	Sport	Event
Silver	Alistair McCorquodale	Athletics	Men's 4 × 100 metres relay
Silver	David Brodie	Field Hockey	Men's competition
Silver	Robin Lindsay	Field Hockey	Men's competition
Silver	William Lindsay	Field Hockey	Men's competition
Silver	George Sime	Field Hockey	Men's competition
Silver	Neil White	Field Hockey	Men's competition
Bronze	Catherine Gibson	Swimming	Women's 400 metre freestyle

=== 1952 Helsinki ===
Medal	Name	Sport	Event
Gold	Douglas Stewart	Equestrian	Team jumping
Bronze	Stephen Theobald	Field Hockey	Men's team event
Bronze	Helen Gordon	Swimming	Women's 200 metre breaststroke

=== 1956 Melbourne ===
Medal	Name	Sport	Event
Gold	Dick McTaggart	Boxing	Lightweight
Silver	Neil Kennedy-Cochran-Patrick	Sailing	5.5 metre
Bronze	John McCormack	Boxing	Light middleweight

=== 1960 Rome ===
Medal	Name	Sport	Event
Bronze	William Fisher	Boxing	Light middleweight
Bronze	Dick McTaggart	Boxing	Lightweight

=== 1964 Tokyo ===
Medal	Name	Sport	Event
Silver	Bob McGregor	Swimming	Men's 100 metre freestyle

=== 1972 Munich ===
Medal	Name	Sport	Event
Silver	David Jenkins	Athletics	Men's 4 × 400 metres relay
Silver	David Wilkie	Swimming	Men's 200 metre breaststroke
Bronze	Ian Stewart	Athletics	Men's 5000 metres

=== 1976 Montreal ===
Medal	Name	Sport	Event
Gold	David Wilkie	Swimming	Men's 200 metre breaststroke
Silver	Hugh Matheson	Rowing	Men's eight
Silver	David Maxwell	Rowing	Men's eight
Silver	David Wilkie	Swimming	Men's 100 metre breaststroke
Bronze	Gordon Downie	Swimming	Men's 4 × 200 metre freestyle relay
Bronze	Alan McClatchey	Swimming	Men's 4 × 200 metre freestyle relay

=== 1980 Moscow ===
Medal	Name	Sport	Event
Gold	Allan Wells	Athletics	Men's 100 metres
Silver	Allan Wells	Athletics	Men's 200 metres
Bronze	Linsey Macdonald	Athletics	Women's 4x400 metres relay

=== 1984 Los Angeles ===
Medal	Name	Sport	Event
Gold	Richard Budgett	Rowing	Men's coxed four
Silver	Ian Stark	Equestrian	Team eventing
Bronze	James Duthie	Field hockey	Men's tournament
Bronze	Veryan Pappin	Field hockey	Men's tournament
Bronze	Alister Allan	Shooting	Men's 50 metre rifle three positions
Bronze	Neil Cochran	Swimming	Men's 200 metre individual medley
Bronze	Neil Cochran	Swimming	Men's 4×200 metre freestyle relay
Bronze	Paul Easter	Swimming	Men's 4×200 metre freestyle relay

=== 1988 Seoul ===
Medal	Name	Sport	Event
Gold	Veryan Pappin	Field hockey	Men's tournament
Gold	Michael McIntyre	Sailing	Men's star class
Silver	Liz McColgan	Athletics	Women's 10,000 metres
Silver	Elliot Bunney	Athletics	Men's 4×100 metres relay
Silver	Ian Stark	Equestrian	Individual eventing
Silver	Ian Stark	Equestrian	Team Eventing
Silver	Alister Allan	Shooting	Men's 50 metre rifle three position
Bronze	Yvonne Murray	Athletics	Women's 3,000 metres

=== 1992 Barcelona ===
Medal	Name	Sport	Event
Bronze	Simon Terry	Archery	Men's individual
Bronze	Simon Terry	Archery	Men's team
Bronze	Susan Fraser	Field hockey	Women's tournament
Bronze	Wendy Fraser	Field hockey	Women's tournament
Bronze	Alison Ramsay	Field hockey	Women's tournament

=== 1996 Atlanta ===
Medal	Name	Sport	Event
Bronze	Graeme Smith	Swimming	Men's 1,500 metre freestyle

=== 2000 Sydney ===
Medal	Name	Sport	Event
Gold	Stephanie Cook	Modern pentathlon	Women's event
Gold	Andrew Lindsay	Rowing	Men's eight
Gold	Shirley Robertson	Sailing	Women's Europe class
Silver	Ian Stark	Equestrian	3-day event team
Silver	Gillian Lindsay	Rowing	Women's quadruple Sculls
Silver	Katherine Grainger	Rowing	Women's quadruple Sculls
Silver	Mark Covell	Sailing	Open star class
Silver	Chris Hoy	Track cycling	Men's team sprint
Silver	Craig MacLean	Track cycling	Men's team sprint

=== 2004 Athens ===
Medal	Name	Sport	Event
Gold	Shirley Robertson	Sailing	Women's yngling class
Gold	Chris Hoy	Track cycling	Men's 1 km time-trial
Silver	Campbell Walsh	Canoe Slalom	Men's K1
Silver	Katherine Grainger	Rowing	Women's coxless pair

=== 2008 Beijing ===
Medal	Name	Sport	Event
Gold	Chris Hoy	Track cycling	Men's keirin
Gold	Chris Hoy	Track cycling	Men's sprint
Gold	Chris Hoy	Track cycling	Men's team sprint
Silver	David Florence	Canoe slalom	Men's C-1
Silver	Katherine Grainger	Rowing	Women's quadruple Sculls
Silver	Ross Edgar	Track cycling	Men's keirin

=== 2012 London ===
Medal	Name	Sport	Event
Gold	Tim Baillie	Canoe slalom	Men's C-2 team
Gold	Scott Brash	Equestrian	Team jumping
Gold	Katherine Grainger	Rowing	Women's double sculls
Gold	Heather Stanning	Rowing	Women's coxless pair
Gold	Andy Murray	Tennis	Men's singles
Gold	Chris Hoy	Track cycling	Men's keirin
Gold	Chris Hoy	Track cycling	Men's team sprint
Silver	David Florence	Canoe slalom	Men's C-2 team
Silver	Luke Patience	Sailing	Men's 470
Silver	Michael Jamieson	Swimming	Men's 200 metres breaststroke
Silver	Andy Murray	Tennis	Mixed doubles
Bronze	Daniel Purvis	Artistic gymnastics	Men's team all-round
Bronze	Laura Bartlett	Field hockey	Women's tournament
Bronze	Emily Maguire	Field hockey	Women's tournament

=== 2016 Rio ===
Medal	Name	Sport	Event
Gold	Heather Stanning	Rowing	Women's coxless pair
Gold	Andy Murray	Tennis	Men's singles
Gold	Katie Archibald	Track cycling	Women's team pursuit
Gold	Callum Skinner	Track cycling	Men's team sprint
Silver	David Florence	Canoe slalom	Men's C–2 team
Silver	Karen Bennett	Rowing	Women's eight
Silver	Katherine Grainger	Rowing	Women's double sculls
Silver	Polly Swann	Rowing	Women's eight
Silver	Mark Bennett	Rugby sevens	Men's tournament
Silver	Mark Robertson	Rugby sevens	Men's tournament
Silver	Stephen Milne	Swimming	Men's 4×200 metre freestyle relay
Silver	Robert Renwick (Note: Renwick earned a medal, as he swam in the heats of the Men's 4×200 metres freestyle relay.)	Swimming	Men's 4×200 metre freestyle relay
Silver	Duncan Scott	Swimming	Men's 4×100 metre medley relay
Silver	Duncan Scott	Swimming	Men's 4×200 metre freestyle relay
Silver	Daniel Wallace	Swimming	Men's 4×200 metre freestyle relay
Silver	Callum Skinner	Track cycling	Men's individual sprint
Bronze	Eilidh Doyle	Athletics	Women's 4 × 400 metres relay
Bronze	Sally Conway	Judo	Women's –70 kilograms

=== 2020 Tokyo ===
Medal	Name	Sport	Event
Gold	Kathleen Dawson	Swimming	Mixed 4 × 100 metre medley relay
Gold	Duncan Scott	Swimming	Men's 4 × 200 metre freestyle relay
Gold	Katie Archibald	Track cycling	Women's Madison
Silver	Laura Muir	Athletics	Women's 1500 metres
Silver	Angus Groom	Rowing	Men's quadruple sculls
Silver	Harry Leask	Rowing	Men's quadruple sculls
Silver	Anna Burnet	Sailing	Mixed Nacra 17
Silver	Duncan Scott	Swimming	Men's 200 metre freestyle
Silver	Duncan Scott	Swimming	Men's 200 metre individual medley
Silver	Duncan Scott	Swimming	Men's 4 × 100 metre medley relay
Silver	Katie Archibald	Track cycling	Women's team pursuit
Silver	Jack Carlin	Track cycling	Men's team sprint
Silver	Neah Evans	Track cycling	Women's team pursuit
Bronze	Josh Kerr	Athletics	Men's 1500 metres
Bronze	Sarah Robertson	Field hockey	Women's tournament
Bronze	Jack Carlin	Track cycling	Men's sprint

=== 2024 Paris ===
Medal	Name	Sport	Event
Gold	Scott Brash	Equestrian	Team jumping
Gold	Sholto Carnegie	Rowing	Men's eight
Gold	Duncan Scott	Swimming	Men's 4 × 200 metre freestyle relay
Silver	Josh Kerr	Athletics	Men's 1500 metres
Silver	Duncan Scott	Swimming	Men's 200 metre individual medley
Silver	Jack Carlin	Track cycling	Men's team sprint
Silver	Neah Evans	Track cycling	Women's Madison
Bronze	Nicole Yeargin	Athletics	Women's 4 × 400 metres relay
Bronze	Nicole Yeargin	Athletics	Mixed 4 × 400 metres relay
Bronze	Rowan McKellar	Rowing	Women's eight
Bronze	Jack Carlin	Track cycling	Men's sprint
Bronze	Beth Potter	Triathlon	Women's triathlon
Bronze	Beth Potter	Triathlon	Mixed relay triathlon

== List of Winter Olympic medallists ==
=== 1924 Chamonix ===
Medal	Name	Sport	Event
Gold	William K. Jackson	Curling	Men's event
Gold	Robin Welsh	Curling	Men's event
Gold	Thomas Murray	Curling	Men's event
Gold	Laurence Jackson	Curling	Men's event
Gold	T. S. Robertson-Aikman	Curling	Men's event

=== 1928 St. Moritz ===
Medal	Name	Sport	Event
Bronze	David Carnegie	Skeleton	Men's singles event

=== 1936 Garmisch-Partenkirchen ===
Medal	Name	Sport	Event
Gold	James Foster	Ice Hockey	Men's competition
Bronze	James Cardno	Bobsleigh	Four-man

=== 2002 Salt Lake City ===
Medal	Name	Sport	Event
Gold	Rhona Martin	Curling	Women's tournament
Gold	Deborah Knox	Curling	Women's tournament
Gold	Fiona MacDonald	Curling	Women's tournament
Gold	Janice Rankin	Curling	Women's tournament
Gold	Margaret Morton	Curling	Women's tournament

=== 2014 Sochi ===
Medal	Name	Sport	Event
Silver	David Murdoch	Curling	Men's tournament
Silver	Greg Drummond	Curling	Men's tournament
Silver	Scott Andrews	Curling	Men's tournament
Silver	Michael Goodfellow	Curling	Men's tournament
Silver	Tom Brewster	Curling	Men's tournament
Bronze	Stuart Benson	Bobsleigh	Four-man
Bronze	Eve Muirhead	Curling	Women's tournament
Bronze	Anna Sloan	Curling	Women's tournament
Bronze	Vicki Adams	Curling	Women's tournament
Bronze	Claire Hamilton	Curling	Women's tournament
Bronze	Lauren Gray	Curling	Women's tournament

=== 2022 Beijing ===
Medal	Name	Sport	Event
Gold	Eve Muirhead	Curling	Women's tournament
Gold	Jennifer Dodds	Curling	Women's tournament
Gold	Hailey Duff	Curling	Women's tournament
Gold	Mili Smith	Curling	Women's tournament
Gold	Vicky Wright	Curling	Women's tournament
Silver	Bruce Mouat	Curling	Men's tournament
Silver	Grant Hardie	Curling	Men's tournament
Silver	Bobby Lammie	Curling	Men's tournament
Silver	Hammy McMillan Jr.	Curling	Men's tournament
Silver	Ross Whyte	Curling	Men's tournament

== See also ==
- Great Britain at the Olympics
- Sport in Scotland
- Campaign for a Scottish Olympic Team
