= Campaign for a Scottish Olympic Team =

Scottish political advocacy group

Campaign for a Scottish Olympic Team (C-ScOT) was a pressure group in Scotland, established in 2005, which aimed to persuade politicians to establish a team to represent Scotland at the Olympic Games.

== History ==
In July 2005, London was announced as the successful bidder for the 2012 Olympics and Paralympics. Shortly after, C-ScOT announced that they had commissioned a question in the regular omnibus survey by Market Research UK which found that 78% of respondents answered yes to the question "Would you like to see Scotland send its own Olympic Team to London 2012?" Over 1,000 adults, aged 16 or over, were interviewed between 12–18 August 2005. Similar levels of support were found by the Daily Record tabloid newspaper.

The survey led to questions in the Scottish Parliament. The survey result also led to discussion at Westminster. The discussions around the football in the London 2012 led to further discussion of possibilities by the Scottish National Party's Alex Salmond. After the SNP's victory in the 2007 Scottish parliament elections, Salmond became First Minister and again made comments around the prospect of Scotland competing at the Olympics.

== Eligibility ==
C-ScOT claimed that a Scottish National Olympic Committee could meet all the criteria set down by the Olympic Charter: eleven non-sovereign nations send teams to the Olympics, including Puerto Rico, Hong Kong and Palestine. There is also precedent for this in other international sporting competitions, such as the football World Cup, in which Scotland fields its own teams.

However, the Olympic Charter has a significant barrier to such a team: since 1995, the Olympic Charter has not allowed for the recognition of non-sovereign nations. Section 31.1 of the Olympic Charter states that to be considered a country, a nation must be "an independent State recognised by the international community"; thus, barring Scotland gaining independence from the United Kingdom, Section 31.1 of the Olympic Charter would require deletion or amendment.

The Olympic Charter also requires there to be at least five national sporting federations, recognised by the international federations of an Olympic sport. This criterion is currently met by Scotland, with the relevant sports being listed below.

=== National sporting federations ===
Affiliated to an international federations of an Olympic sport

- BadmintonScotland – Badminton
- Amateur Boxing Scotland – Boxing
- Royal Caledonian Curling Club – Curling
- Scottish Hockey Union – Field hockey
- Scottish Football Association – Football
- Scottish Golf – Golf
- Scottish Rugby Union – Rugby sevens
- Table Tennis Scotland – Table tennis

Not affiliated to an international federations of an Olympic sport

- Scottish Archery Association – Archery
- Scottish Athletics – Athletics
- Scottish Canoe Association – Canoeing
- Scottish Cycling – Cycling
- Scottish Swimming – Diving, Swimming, Synchronized swimming, Water polo
- Scottish fencing – Fencing
- Scottish Gymnastics – Gymnastics
- Scottish Handball Association – Handball
- Scottish Ice Hockey – Ice hockey
- Judo Scotland – Judo
- Scottish Rowing – Rowing
- Scottish Target Shooting Federation – Shooting
- Tennis Scotland – Tennis
- Scottish Triathlon Association – Triathlon
- Scottish Amateur Weightlifters Association – Weightlifting
- Scottish Wrestling Association – Wrestling
- TAGB Scotland – Taekwondo

== 2014 referendum ==
Ahead of the 2014 referendum, an expert panel, the Working Group on Scottish Sport chaired by former First Minister Henry McLeish published their report in May. The panel concluded that there was "no obvious or major barrier" to a Scottish team taking part in the 2016 Rio Olympics if the country were to vote for independence. According to the Scottish Government's timetable as set out in its White Paper on an independent Scotland, the country would have become independent on 24 March 2016 after a Yes vote.

Ahead of the vote, the President of the IOC, Thomas Bach, said that a Scottish team could compete at the Olympics if Scotland voted for independence: "We respect democratic decisions. We always do. But you can see from previous decisions we have been taking in similar cases that we are always safeguarding the interests of the athletes."

== See also ==
- Scottish Olympic medallists
- Great Britain at the Olympics
- Glasgow bid for the 2018 Summer Youth Olympics
- British and Irish Lions
