= Sailing at the 1908 Summer Olympics – 12 Metre =

12 Metre at the Games of the IV Olympiad
- Line drawing of a 12 Metre yacht from 1908
- Venue: Clyde Corinthian Yacht Club; Hunters Quay
- Dates: First race: August 11, 1908; Last race: August 12, 1908
- Competitors: 20 from 1 nation
- Teams: 2

Medalists
1st place, gold medalist(s)		T. C. Glen-Coats (helmsman), J. H. Downes (mate), J. S. Aspin, John Buchanan, J. C. Bunten, A. D. Downes, David Dunlop, John Mackenzie, Albert Martin, Gerald Tait	Great Britain
2nd place, silver medalist(s)		C. MacIver (helmsman), J. G. Kenion (mate), J. M. Adam, James Baxter, W. P. Davidson, J. F. Jellico, T. A. R. Littledale, C. R. MacIver, C. Macleod Robertson, J. F. D. Spence	Great Britain

The 12 Metre was a sailing event on the Sailing at the 1908 Summer Olympics program in Hunters Quay. Three races were scheduled. Each nation could enter up to 2 boats. 20 sailors, on 2 boats, from 1 nation competed.

== Race schedule ==
●	Event competitions	●	Event finals

Date	July					August											
Date	27 Mon	28 Tue	29 Wed	30 Thu	31 Fri	1 Sat	2 Sun	3 Mon	4 Tue	5 Wed	6 Thu	7 Fri	8 Sat	9 Sun	10 Mon	11 Tue	12 Wed
12-Metre																●	●
Total gold medals																	1

== Course area ==
The following course was used during the 1908 Olympic 12-Metre regattas in all two races:

- Start at Hunter's Quay
- Buoy at Inverkip
- Buoy at Dunoon
- Buoy at Kilcreggan
- Back to Hunter's Quay

Two rounds for a total of 26 nautical miles (48 km).

1908 Olympic Course Area, Hunters Quay
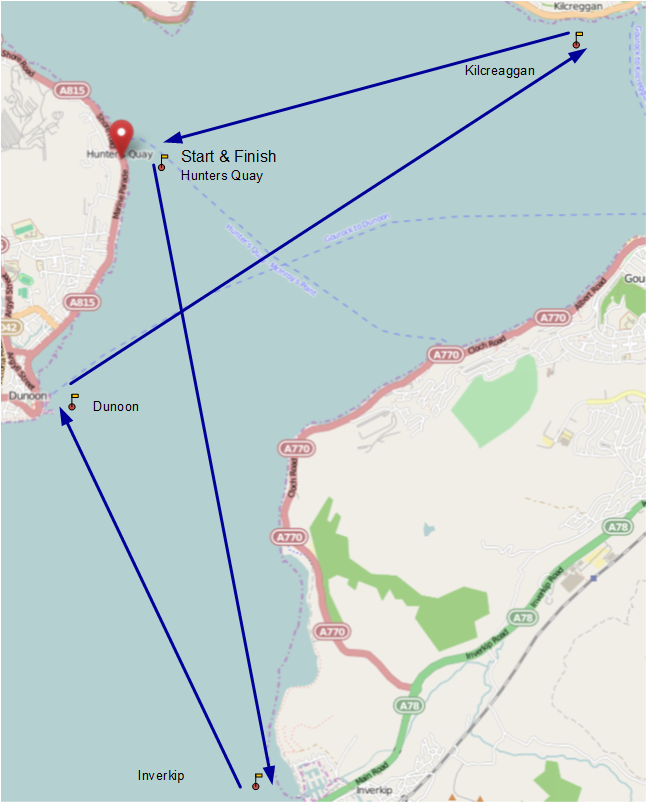

== Weather conditions ==
Date	Race	Description	Sea	Wind direction	Start
11-AUG-1908	1	Moderate wind. Puffy at times.	A pleasant curl on the water.		11:30
12-AUG-1908	2	Starting light and steady then died at noon. Later filled in with light air.	Death calm	later	11:30

== Final results ==
The 1908 Olympic scoring system was used. All competitors were male For first place the helmsman and mate of the Hera received gold medals but the crew received silver medals. For second place the helmsman and mate of the Mouchette received silver medals but the crew received bronze medals.

Rank	Country	Helmsman	Crew	Boat	Race 1		Race 2		Total
Rank	Country	Helmsman	Crew	Boat	Pos.	Pts.	Pos.	Pts.	Total
1	Great Britain	T. C. Glen-Coats	J. H. Downes (Mate) J. S. Aspin John Buchanan J. C. Bunten A. D. Downes David Dunlop John Mackenzie Albert Martin Gerald Tait	Hera	1	3	1	3	2 first places
2	Great Britain	C. MacIver	J. G. Kenion (Mate) J. M. Adam James Baxter W. P. Davidson J. F. Jellico T. A. R. Littledale C. R. MacIver C. Macleod Robertson J. F. D. Spence	Mouchette	2	2	2	2	2 second places

== Other information ==
=== Extra awards ===
Gilt commemorative medal:

- T. C. Glen-Coats, owner of Hera

Silver commemorative medal:

- C. MacIver, owner of Mouchette
