= Eric Sandberg =

Sailor

Medal record

Sailing

Representing Sweden

Olympic Games
Silver medal – second place	1908 London	8 Metre
Bronze medal – third place	1912 Stockholm	6 Metre

Eric G. Sandberg (December 19, 1884 – December 8, 1966) was a Swedish sailor who competed in the 1908 Summer Olympics and in the 1912 Summer Olympics. In 1908, he won a silver medal as a crew member of the Swedish Vinga in the 8 metre class. Four years later, he was part of the Swedish boat Kerstin, which won the bronze medal in the 6 metre class.

At the 1912 Olympic Games in Stockholm, Sandberg secured the bronze medal in the 6-meter class. This time he was skipper of the Kerstin, which, like the other Swedish boat, the Sass, achieved third place in both races of the regatta. While a tiebreaker for the Olympic gold was held between the Mac Miche from France and the Nurdug II from Denmark, another race between the Kerstin and the Sass decided the bronze medal. The Kerstin prevailed, so Sandberg and his crew, consisting of Harald Sandberg and Otto Aust, finished in third place.
