= Louis Huybrechts =

Belgian sailor

Medal record

Sailing

Representing Belgium

Olympic Games
Silver medal – second place	1908 London	6 Metre

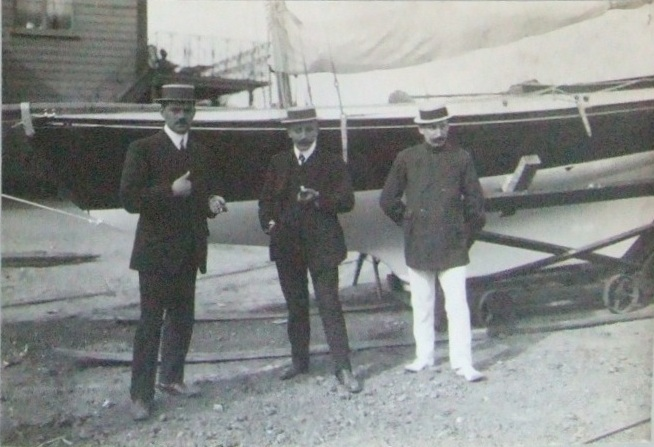
Léon and Louis Huybrechts and Henri Weewauters, the crew of the six-meter yacht Zut, which won Olympic silver in London in 1908.

Louis Huybrechts (21 February 1875 – 1963) was a Belgian sailor. He won the Silver medal in the 6m class in the 1908 Summer Olympics in London along with Léon Huybrechts and Henri Weewauters.
