= John Downes (sailor) =

Scottish sailor

Medal record

Sailing

Representing Great Britain

Olympic Games
Gold medal – first place	1908 London	12 metre

John Henry Downes (18 October 1870 in Glasgow – 1 January 1943 in Hunters Quay) was a Scottish sailor who competed for the Royal Clyde Yacht Club at the 1908 Summer Olympics.

He was mate of the Scottish boat Hera, which won the gold medal in the 12 metre class.
