= John Aspin =

Scottish businessman and sailor (1877–1960)

Medal record

Sailing

Representing Great Britain

Olympic Games
Gold medal – first place	1908 London	12 metre class

John Symington Aspin (21 March 1877, Anderston, Glasgow – 19 February 1960) was a Scottish businessman and sailor who competed for the Royal Clyde Yacht Club at Hunters Quay and represented Great Britain at the 1908 Summer Olympics.

He was a crew member on the Hera, which finished first of two teams competing in the 12 metre class. At the time, only the helmsman and mate were awarded gold medals, while the crew received silver medals. However, Aspin is credited as having received a gold medal in the official Olympic database.
