= Omnibus (survey) =

An omnibus survey is a method of quantitative marketing research where data on a wide variety of subjects is collected during the same interview. Usually, multiple research clients will provide proprietary content for the survey (paying to 'get on the omnibus'), while sharing the common demographic data collected from each respondent.

An omnibus survey generally uses a stratified sample and can be conducted in person via an interviewer, as well as by mail, telephone, or Internet.

The advantages to the research client include cost savings (because the sampling and screening costs are shared across multiple clients) and timeliness (because omnibus samples are large and interviewing is ongoing).

However, the number of questions will be smaller and sometimes the theme of one of the research client will not be of interest for a part of the respondents.
