= J. Graham Kenion =

British Olympic sailor (1871–1942)

Personal information
- Full name: John Graham Kenion
- Nationality: British
- Born: 30 July 1871 Bebington, England
- Died: 23 April 1942 (aged 70) Wirral, England

Sport

Sailing career
- Class: 12-metre class
Medal record
Sailing
Representing Great Britain
Olympic Games
Silver medal – second place	1908 London	12 metre
- Updated on 2 February 2015

J. Graham Kenion (30 July 1871 – 23 April 1942) was a sailor from the Great Britain, who represented his native country at the 1908 Summer Olympics in Hunters Quay, Great Britain. Kenion was a crew member of the British boat Mouchette, which won the silver medal in the 12-metre class.
