= Thomas McMeekin =

British sailor

Medal record

Men's sailing

Representing United Kingdom

Olympic Games
Gold medal – first place	1908 London	6 metre

Thomas Doodputlee McMeekin (31 December 1866 – 24 October 1946) was a British sailor and Olympic champion. He competed at the 1908 Summer Olympics in London and won a silver medal in the 6 metre class. The gold medal was won by his helmsman G.U.Laws, who had also designed the boat (Dormy).
