= John Buchanan (sailor) =

Scottish sailor

Medal record

Sailing

Representing Great Britain

Olympic Games
Gold medal – first place	1908 London	12 metre

John Buchanan (1 January 1884 in Rhu – 25 November 1943 in Rhu) was a Scottish sailor who competed for the Royal Clyde Yacht Club in the 1908 Summer Olympics.

He was a crew member of the Scottish boat Hera, which won the gold medal in the 12-metre class.
