= Charles R. MacIver =

British sportsperson

Personal information
- Full name: Charles Ronald MacIver
- Nationality: British
- Born: 26 October 1890 Bromborough, Great Britain
- Died: 25 April 1981 (aged 90)

Sport

Sailing career
- Class: 12-metre class
Medal record
Sailing
Representing Great Britain
Olympic Games
Silver medal – second place	1908 London	12-metre class
- Updated on 2 February 2015

Charles R. MacIver (26 October 1890 – 25 April 1981) was a British sailing competitor at the 1908 Summer Olympics. Sources give his name as Charles Ronald MacIver, the son of Charles MacIver.

He was a crew member on the Mouchette which finished second of two teams competing in the 12 metre class. At the time, only the helmsman and mate were awarded silver medals, while the crew received bronze medals. However, MacIver is credited as having received a silver medal in the official Olympic database.
