= John Adam (sailor) =

British sailor

Medal record

Sailing

Representing Great Britain

Olympic Games
Silver medal – second place	1908 London	12 metre class

John McCullough Adam (6 November 1875 – 24 January 1946) was a British sailing competitor at the 1908 Summer Olympics.

He was a crew member on the Mouchette which finished second of two teams competing in the 12 metre class. At the time, only the helmsman and mate were awarded silver medals, while the crew received bronze medals. However, Adam is credited as having received a silver medal in the official Olympic database.
