= Gerald Tait =

Scottish sailor

Medal record

Sailing

Representing Great Britain

Olympic Games
Gold medal – first place	1908 London	12 metre

Thomas Gerald Tait (7 November 1866, in Campbeltown – 19 December 1938, in Glasgow) was a Scottish sailor who competed for the Royal Clyde Yacht Club at the 1908 Summer Olympics.

He was a crew member of the Scottish boat Hera, which won the gold medal in the 12 metre class.
