= James Clark Bunten (sailor) =

Scottish sailor (1875–1935)

Medal record

Sailing

Representing Great Britain

Olympic Games
Gold medal – first place	1908 London	12 metre

James Clark Bunten (28 March 1875 – 3 June 1935) was a Scottish sailor who competed for the Royal Clyde Yacht Club at the 1908 Summer Olympics.

He was a crew member of the Scottish boat Hera, which won the gold medal in the 12 metre class. He was born and died in Glasgow.
