= John Jellico =

British sailor

Medal record

Sailing

Representing Great Britain

Olympic Games
Silver medal – second place	1908 London	12 metre

John Fletcher Jellico (24 October 1856 – 9 August 1925) was a British/Irish sailor who competed in the 1908 Summer Olympics.

He was a crew member of the British boat Mouchette, which won the silver medal in the 12 metre class.
