= Thomas Littledale =

British sailor

Personal information
- Full name: Thomas Alfred Royds Littledale
- Born: 2 April 1850 West Derby, Liverpool, Merseyside, England
- Died: 4 December 1938 (aged 88) Saint-Jean-de-Luz, Pyrénées-Atlantiques, France
Medal record
Sailing
Representing Great Britain
Olympic Games
Silver medal – second place	1908 London	12 metre class

Thomas Alfred Royds Littledale (2 April 1850 – 4 December 1938) was a British sailor who competed in the 1908 Summer Olympics.

He was a crew member of the British boat Mouchette, which won the silver medal in the 12 metre class.
