= Arthur Downes =

Scottish sailor

Medal record

Sailing

Representing Great Britain

Olympic Games
Gold medal – first place	1908 London	12 metre

Arthur Drummond Downes (23 February 1883, in Kelvinside, Glasgow – 12 September 1956, in Helensburgh) was a Scottish sailor who competed for the Royal Clyde Yacht Club at the 1908 Summer Olympics.

Son of a Kelvinside paper merchant, Downes was qualified in medicine (MA, MBChB) at the University of Glasgow; he practiced first at Glasgow, then at Helensburgh for over forty years.

He was a crew member of the Scottish boat Hera, which won the gold medal in the 12 metre class.

In 1920, Downes married Mary Angela, daughter of merchant James Young of Rockmount, Helensburgh.
