= Neil Kennedy-Cochran-Patrick =

British sailor

Personal information
- Born: 5 May 1926 London, England
- Died: 14 October 1994 (aged 68) Andorra

Sailing career
- Sport: Sailing
Medal record
Sailing
Representing Great Britain
Olympic Games
| Silver medal – second place | 1956 Melbourne | 5.5 metre class |

Neil Aylmer Kennedy-Cochran-Patrick-Hunter (5 May 1926 in London – 14 October 1994 in Andorra) was a British sailor. He won a silver medal in the 5.5 metre class at the 1956 Summer Olympics.

Neil was the son of the Scottish World War I flying ace William Kennedy-Cochran-Patrick. He was the 29th Laird of Hunterston.
