= William Davidson (sailor) =

British sailor

Personal information
- Full name: William Phythian Davidson
- Nationality: British
- Born: 1876 Liverpool
- Died: 15 April 1939 (aged 62–63) Hoylake

Sailing career
- Sport: Sailing
- Club: Royal Mersey Yacht Club
- Class: 12 Metre
Medal record
Sailing
Representing Great Britain
Olympic Games
Silver medal – second place	1908 London	12 metre class

William Phythian Davidson (1876 – 15 April 1939) was a British sailing competitor at the 1908 Summer Olympics.

He was a crew member on the Mouchette which finished second of two teams competing in the 12 metre class. At the time, only the helmsman and mate were awarded silver medals, while the crew received bronze medals. However, Davidson is credited as having received a silver medal in the official Olympic database.

He was also a Chartered Accountant (ACA 1901) and was President of the Liverpool Society of Chartered Accountants in 1930/31. He served as a Lieutenant in the Royal Navy Reserve in World War One.
