= David Dunlop (sailor) =

Scottish sailor

Medal record

Sailing

Representing Great Britain

Olympic Games
Gold medal – first place	1908 London	12 metre

David Dunlop (22 December 1859 – 3 September 1931) was a Scottish sailor and Olympic champion. Dunlop competed for the Royal Clyde Yacht Club at the 1908 Summer Olympics.

He was a crew member of the Scottish boat Hera, which won the gold medal in the 12 metre class.
