= Colin MacLeod Robertson =

British sailor

Personal information
- Nationality: British
- Born: 7 May 1870 Belfast, Ireland
- Died: 2 July 1951 (aged 81) Dumbarton, Scotland

Sailing career
- Sport: Sailing
- Class: 12-metre class
Medal record
Sailing
Representing Great Britain
Olympic Games
Silver medal – second place	1908 London	12-metre class
- Updated on 2 February 2015

Colonel Colin MacLeod Robertson CB DSO TD DL JP (7 May 1870 – 2 July 1951), sometimes incorrectly listed as Charles Macleod-Robertson, was a British Army officer and a sailing competitor at the 1908 Summer Olympics.

He was a crew member on the Mouchette which finished second of two teams competing in the 12 metre class. At the time, only the helmsman and mate were awarded silver medals, while the crew received bronze medals. However, Macleod-Robertson is credited as having received a silver medal in the official Olympic database.
