= John Mackenzie (sailor) =

Scottish sailor

Medal record

Sailing

Representing Great Britain

Olympic Games
Gold medal – first place	1908 London	12-metre

John Mackenzie (21 September 1876 – 9 December 1949) was a Scottish sailor who competed for the Royal Clyde Yacht Club at the 1908 Summer Olympics. Mackenzie was born in Greenock.

He was a crew member of the Scottish boat Hera, which won the gold medal in the 12-metre class.
