= John Spence (sailor) =

British sailor

Personal information
- Full name: John F. D. Spence
- Nationality: British
- Born: 2 October 1875 Leith, Scotland
- Died: 20 February 1946 (aged 70) Haymarket, Scotland

Sport

Sailing career
- Class: 12-metre class
Medal record
Sailing
Representing Great Britain
Olympic Games
Silver medal – second place	1908 London	12-metre class
- Updated on 2 February 2015

John F. D. Spence (2 October 1875 – 20 February 1946) was a British sailing competitor at the 1908 Summer Olympics. Sources also give his name as James Fleming Drever Spence.

He was a crew member on the Mouchette which finished second of two teams competing in the 12 metre class. At the time, only the helmsman and mate were awarded silver medals, while the crew received bronze medals. However, Spence is credited as having received a silver medal in the official Olympic database.
