= Charles MacIver =

Sailor

Olympic medal record

Sailing

Representing Great Britain
Silver medal – second place	1908 London	12 metre class

Charles MacIver (28 November 1866 – 21 December 1935) was a British sailor who competed in the 1908 Summer Olympics. He was a crew member of the British boat Mouchette, which won the silver medal in the 12 metre class.
