= Sir Thomas Glen-Coats, 2nd Baronet =

Scottish sailor

Medal record

Sailing

Representing Great Britain

Olympic Games
Gold medal – first place	1908 London	12 metre class

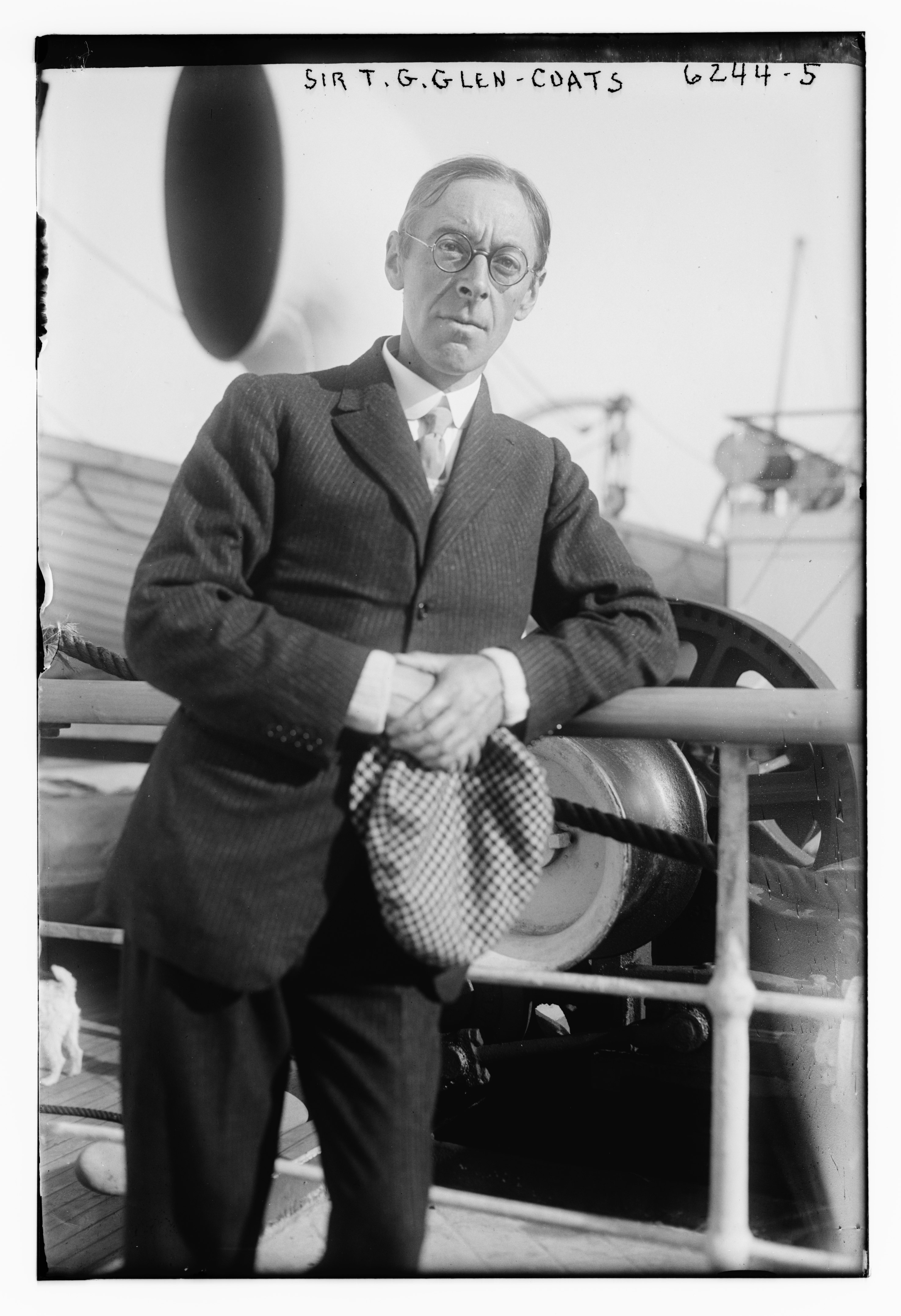
Sir T. G. Glen-Coats in 1924

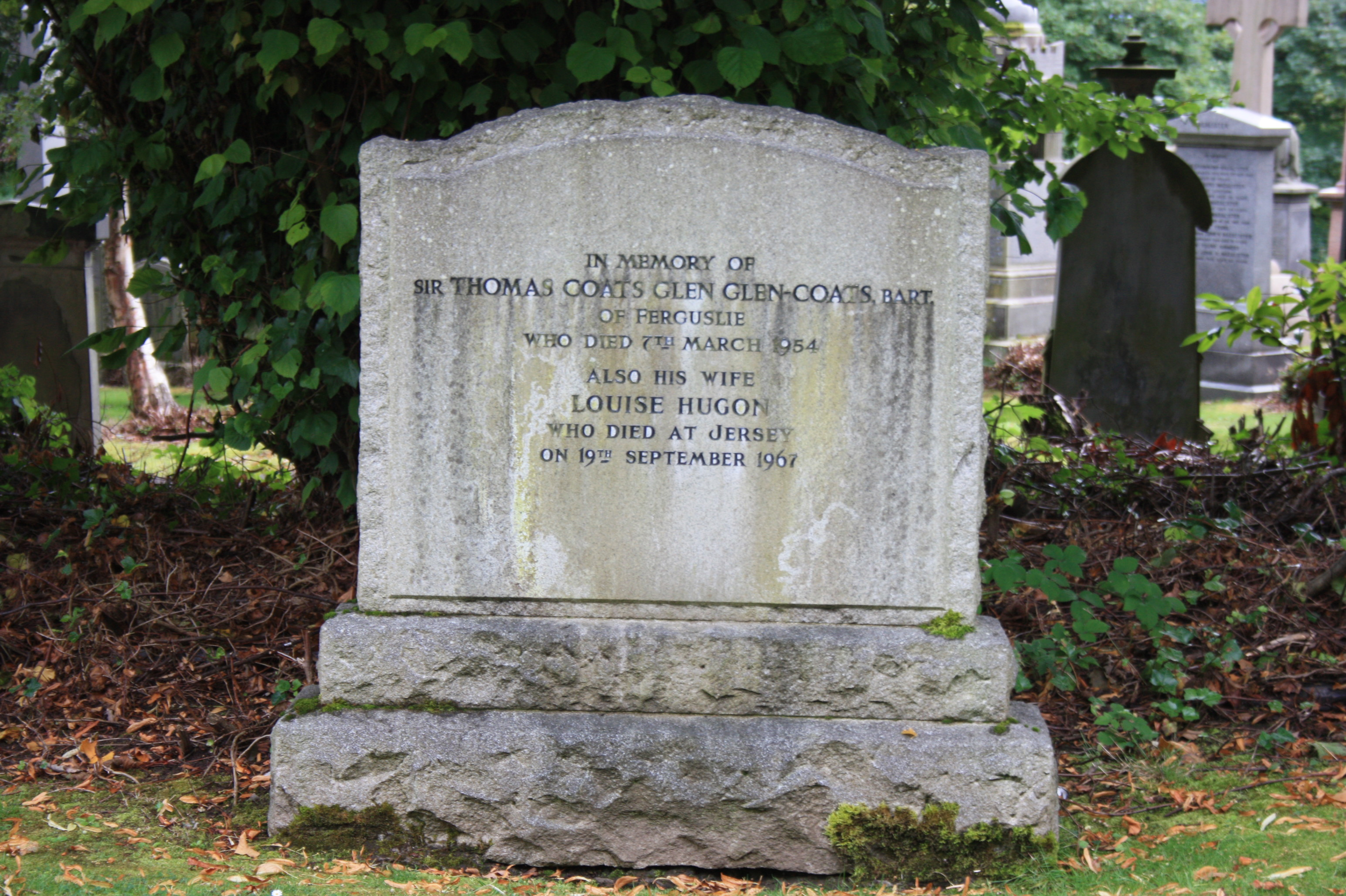
The grave of Sir Thomas Glen Glen-Coats, Woodside Cemetery, Paisley

Sir Thomas Coats Glen Glen-Coats, 2nd Baronet (5 May 1878, in Paisley – 7 March 1954, in Glasgow) was a Scottish sailor who competed for the Royal Clyde Yacht Club in the 12-metre class at the 1908 Summer Olympics.

He was the son of Sir Thomas Glen-Coats, 1st Baronet, Member of Parliament for West Renfrewshire.

The 12-Metre Heatherbell was designed by Thomas C Glen-Coats (skipper) for Major Andrew Coats and built by Alexander Robertson & Sons in 1907. She was the first yacht in the new metre-class to be built in the UK. The 'Coats' name (textile/thread dynasty of Paisley) became well known for racing 8-Metres on the Clyde between 1911 and 1938. Heatherbell later represented Finland in the 1912 Helsinki Summer Olympics.

He was also the designer and helm of the British boat Hera, which won the 1908 gold medal in the 12-metre class. He was an apprentice to Alfred Mylne, who crewed on the yacht for his young protégé.

On his father's death in 1922, he became a baronet.

He died on 7 March 1954. He is buried next to Sir James Coats at the summit of Woodside Cemetery in Paisley.

== Lady Glen-Coats ==
On 5 April 1935, he married Louise Hugon, the daughter of Emile Hugon. In 1938, she became the prospective Liberal candidate for Orkney & Shetland. The Liberals had lost the seat to the Conservatives in 1935 and hoped to regain it at a general election expected for 1939–40. However, the outbreak of war postponed the election. She remained as a prospective candidate but, in 1945, stepped down in favour of Jo Grimond, who went on to win the seat in 1950. Instead, she stood in Paisley, where the Glen-Coats were prominent local industrialists, coming third with just over 10%. From 1946 to 1948 she was Chair of the Scottish Liberal Party. She died suddenly in Jersey on 19 September 1967.

The baronetcy became extinct on his death.

Baronetage of the United Kingdom
Preceded by Thomas Glen-Coats	Baronet (of Ferguslie Park); 1922–1954	Extinct
