= Hunters Quay =

Village in Scotland

Coordinates: 55.970717°N 4.9115818°W

Hunters Quay: Scottish Gaelic: Camas Rainich
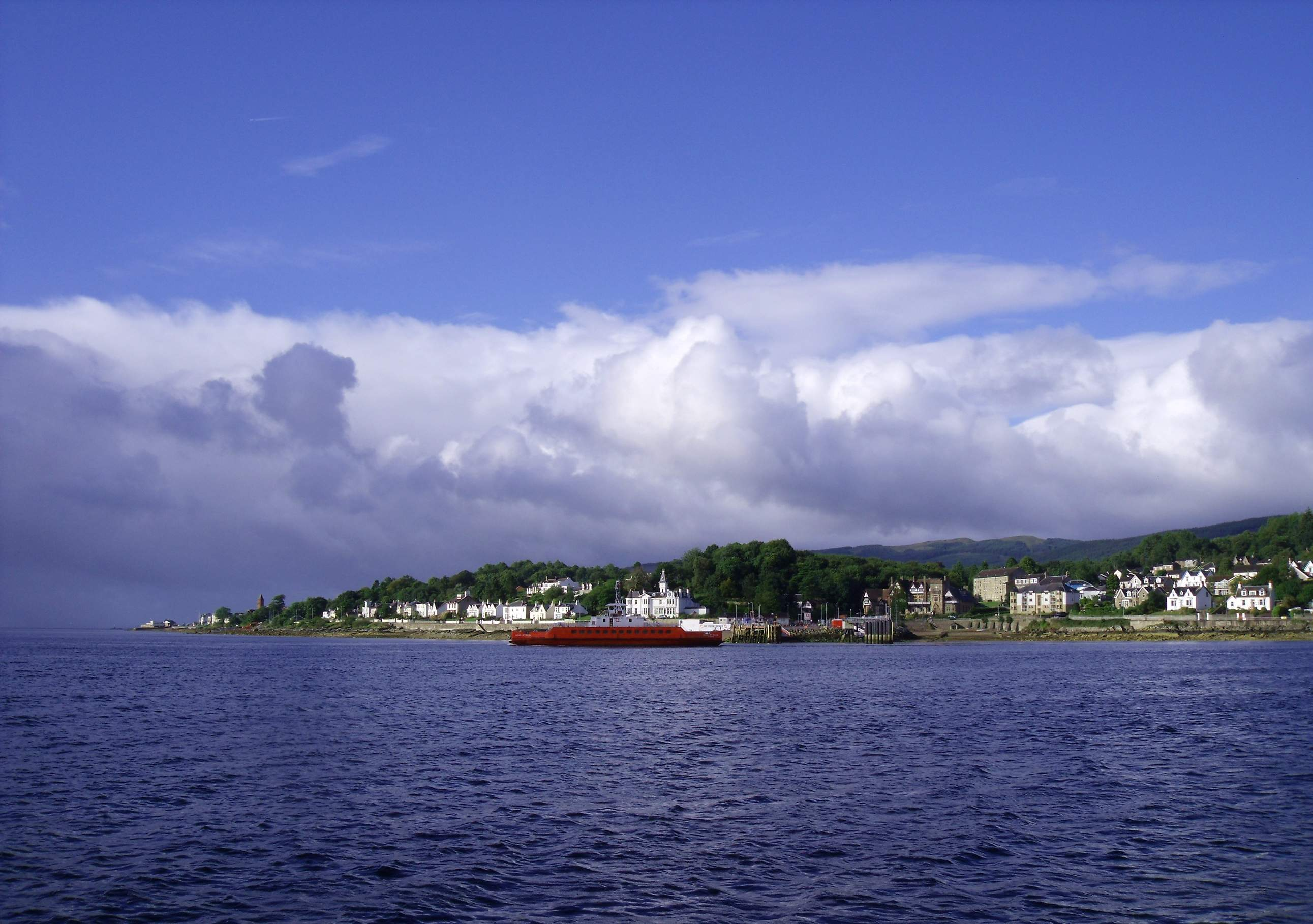
- Hunters Quay viewed from the Firth of Clyde, looking southwest

- Location within Argyll and Bute
- Population: 5,198 (2013 Est) Including; Kirn, Hunters Quay and Sandbank.
- OS grid reference: NS 18396 79130
- Council area: Argyll and Bute
- Lieutenancy area: Argyll and Bute
- Country: Scotland
- Sovereign state: United Kingdom
- Post town: DUNOON, ARGYLL
- Postcode district: PA23
- Dialling code: 01369
- UK Parliament: Argyll, Bute and South Lochaber
- Scottish Parliament: Argyll and Bute

Hunters Quay (Scottish Gaelic: Camas Rainich) is a village in Argyll and Bute, Scotland. Situated between Kirn to the south and Ardnadam to the north, Hunters Quay is the main base of Western Ferries, operating between Hunters Quay and McInroy's Point.

== Structures ==
=== Royal Marine Hotel ===
The current building was built in 1890. This and the previous building was, between 1872 and the 1950s, the home of the Royal Clyde Yacht Club, which was founded in 1856.

=== Hafton House ===
Built in 1815 for James Hunter.

=== Villas ===
In the mid 19th century, the principal villas at Hunters Quay were Claver House (Mr Miller), Linnwood (Mr Somerville), Rock Hill (Capt. Littlejohn), Whinhill (Mrs Ross), Woodside (Mr Bell) and Craigend (Mr Bryson).

== 1908 Summer Olympic Games ==
The 12-metre class yacht race in the 1908 London Olympic Games took place at Hunters Quay. Most of the sailing took place on the Solent, but only two boats entered the 12-metre class: Mouchette from the Royal Liverpool Yacht Club and Hera from the Royal Clyde Yacht Club. They were allowed to race on the Clyde for convenience. The course was twice round a 13-mile (21-kilometre) lap of the Clyde, starting and finishing at Hunters Quay. Thomas C. Glen-Coats' Hera won.

== Jim Crow Rock – Puffin Rock ==
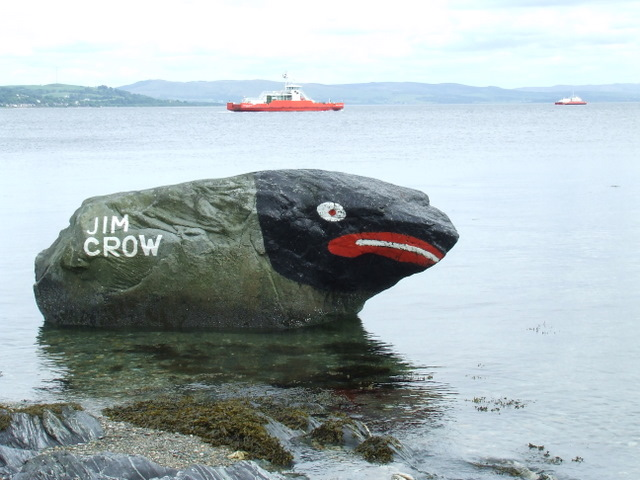
Jim Crow rock, Hunters Quay (pre 2021)

"Jim Crow", a pointed glacial erratic rock lying horizontally on the village's beach facing the Firth of Clyde, was known as the "Jim Crow Stone" by 1864, and by 1904 was painted with a face. There have been various suggestions for the inspiration behind the name and design: the Jim Crow character featured in "Jump Jim Crow", a song and dance popularised in 1832 by the American minstrel show performer Thomas D. Rice; local stories suggest it could have been the name of the owner of a nearby builders'/joiners yard; a jackdaw [which has a black beak but not a red mouth]; or the later Jim Crow laws which were state and local laws enforcing racial segregation in the Southern United States. Another suggestion is that it was named after the line "So they canonized him by the name of Jim Crow!" in the 1837 poem The Jackdaw of Rheims.

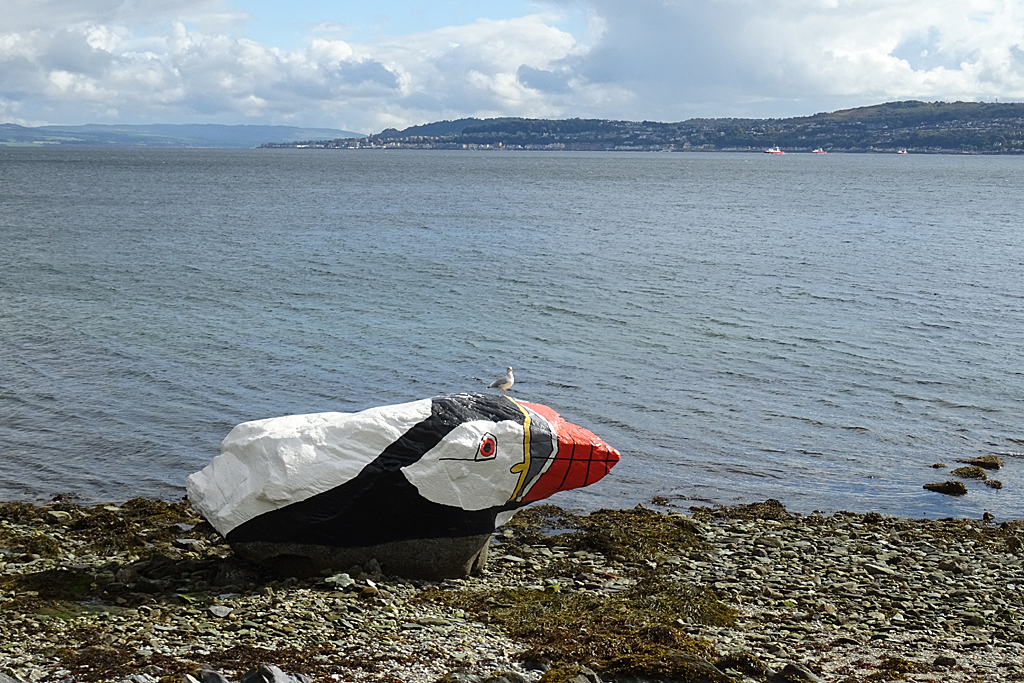
2021, now Puffin Rock

Due to concerns about racism the rock was painted over several times, but repeatedly returned to its original state. In 2017, Neville Lawrence, father of Stephen Lawrence, saw the rock when he was on holiday in the area, and described it as saddening and disappointing, an uncomfortable reminder of division. It later attracted Black Lives Matter protests, and was painted black. In community efforts to find a way forward, a competition was held for young people to propose a unifying design. The winning design was by a pupil from Dunoon Grammar School, who with other pupils re-painted the rock in 2021 as a puffin.

== Transport ==
=== Western Ferries ===
Hunters Quay is the headquarters of Western Ferries. The existing Hunters Quay Pier was used since 1973. The port has since been expanded and now incorporates two floating ramps. The service connects to McInroy's Point near to Gourock in Inverclyde, on the eastern shore of the upper Firth of Clyde.

== Gallery ==
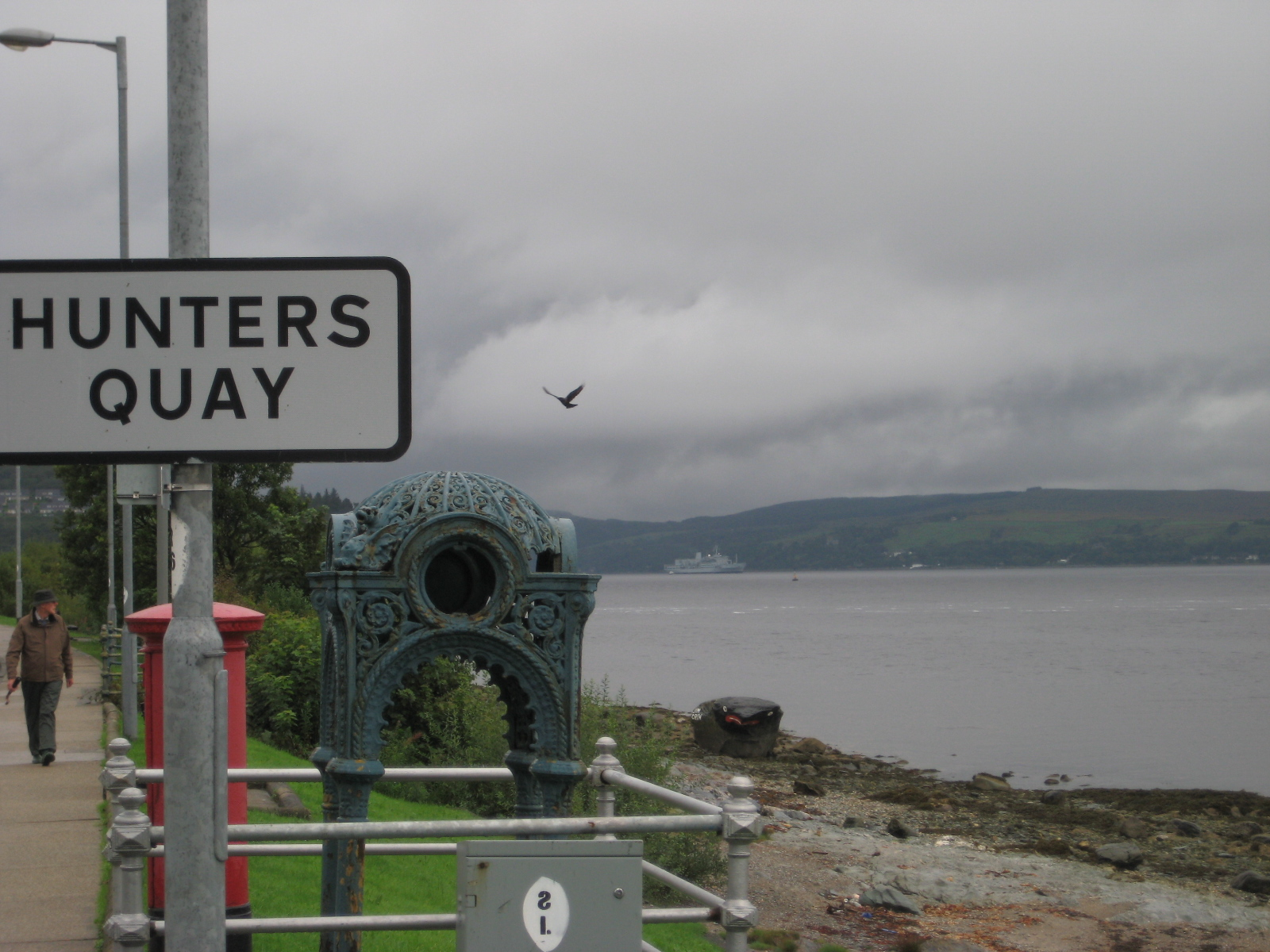
A view of the Holy Loch, looking northwest towards Kilmun.

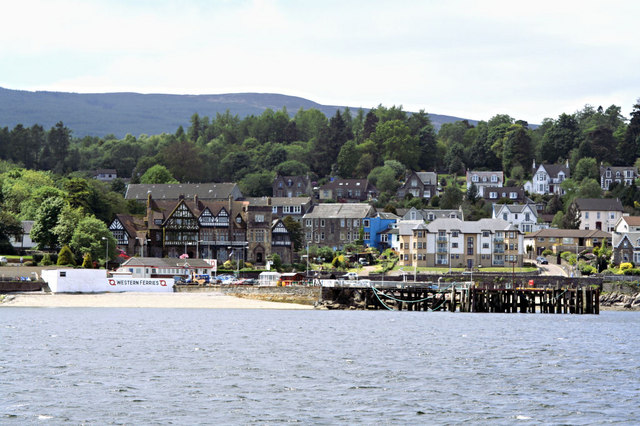
The Royal Marine Hotel is the half-timbered building.

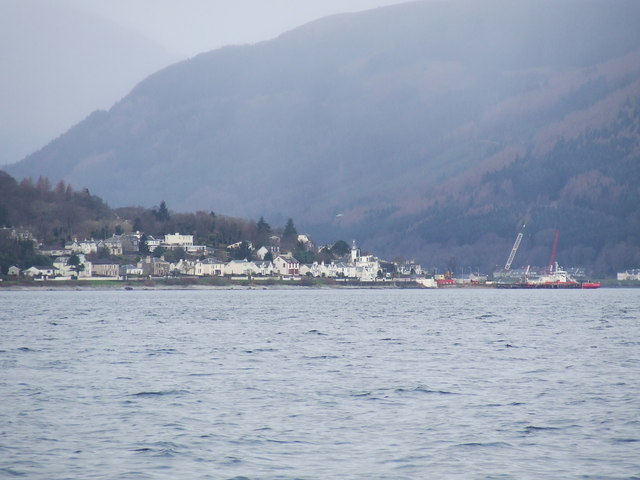
Hunters Quay viewed from Cloch Point.

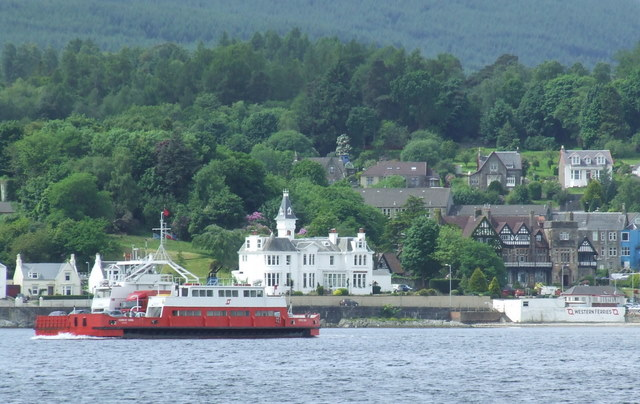
A Western Ferries ferry approaching the quay.
