= Royal Northern and Clyde Yacht Club =

Scottish yacht club

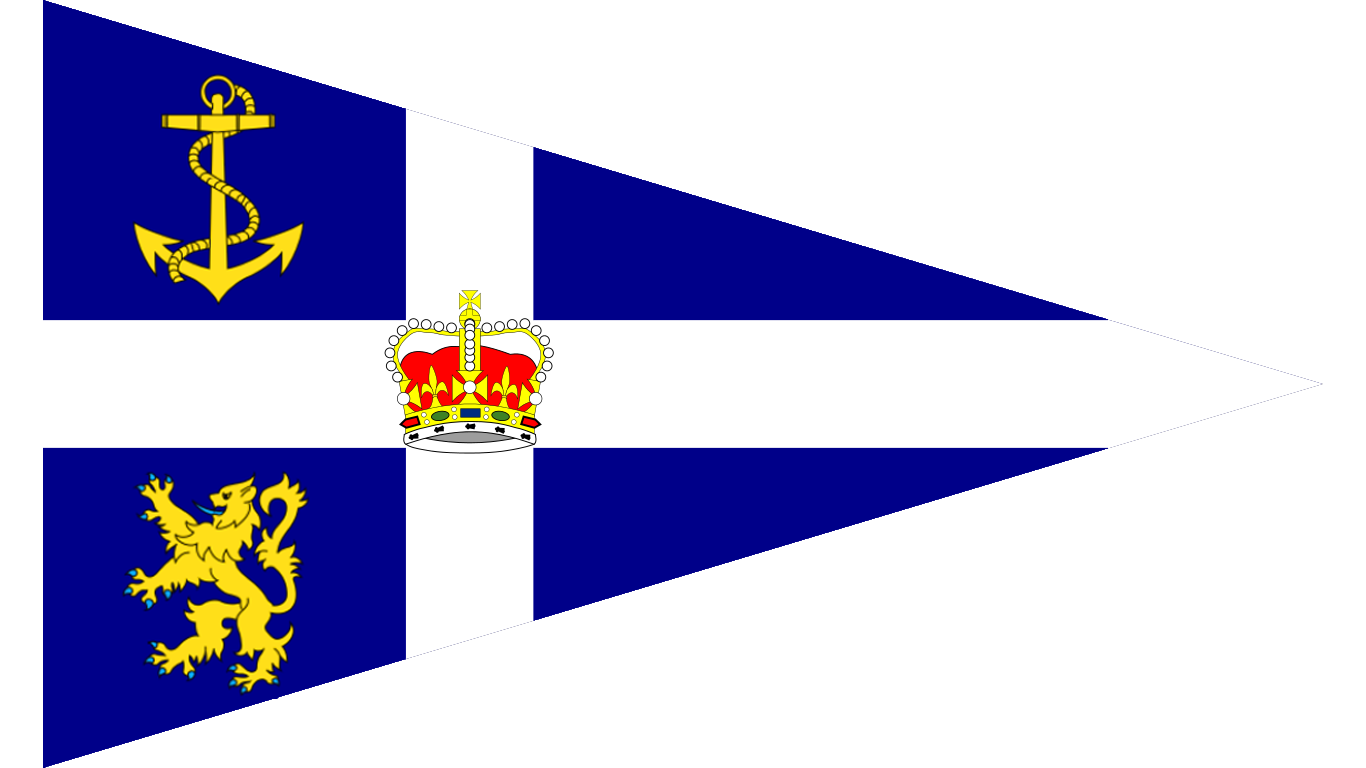
- Burgee

- Ensign
- Short name: RNCYC
- Founded: 1824
- Location: Argyll and Bute, Scotland
- Website: http://rncyc.com

The Royal Northern & Clyde Yacht Club is a yacht club founded in Scotland in 1978, by merger of the Royal Northern Yacht Club (founded in 1824) and the Royal Clyde Yacht Club (founded in 1856).

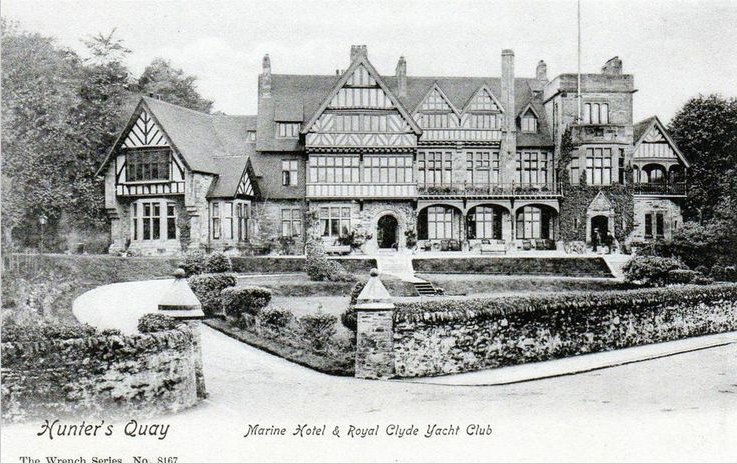
The Royal Marine Hotel clubhouse of the Royal Clyde Yacht Club at Hunters Quay

== History ==
The Royal Northern was originally based in Rothesay but moved to the current clubhouse in Rhu on the Gare Loch in 1937. The Royal Clyde vacated its premises at Hunters Quay in the fifties and also moved to Rhu before the two clubs merged in 1978 to form the Royal Northern & Clyde Yacht Club.

The Royal Northern Yacht Club is believed to have been one of the first British yachting clubs to receive a royal charter, in 1830. The club was founded to organise and encourage the sport, and by 1825 Scottish and Irish clubs were racing against each other on the Clyde. However, yachting and yacht building didn't really take off until the middle of the 19th century. The Clyde Model Yacht Club was inaugurated in 1856, receiving its royal charter in 1863, and the two clubs dominated the Scottish yachting scene at that time. In 1886 the Royal Northern yacht Galatea challenged for the America's Cup and the following year it was the turn of Thistle from the Royal Clyde.

Thomas C. Glen-Coats' Hera from the Royal Clyde won the gold medal in the 12-metre class in sailing at the 1908 Summer Olympics, contested on the Clyde.

Wilhelm Iff's "Royal Clyde Yacht Club Polka" was performed by his orchestra and recorded in 1899 in Glasgow.

== See also ==
- Firth of Clyde
- River Clyde
- Atlantic
- Galatea
- Thistle
- Charlie Barr
- Robert Napier
- Alexander Robertson & Sons
- Gareloch Class
- Scottish Olympic medallists
