= Norway at the 1920 Summer Olympics =

- IOC code: NOR
- NOC: Norwegian National Federation of Sports

in Antwerp
- Competitors: 194 (188 men, 6 women) in 16 sports
- Flag bearer: Helge Løvland (athletics)
- Medals Ranked 6th: Gold 13 Silver 9 Bronze 9 Total 31

Summer Olympics appearances (overview)
- 1900; 1904; 1908; 1912; 1920; 1924; 1928; 1932; 1936; 1948; 1952; 1956; 1960; 1964; 1968; 1972; 1976; 1980; 1984; 1988; 1992; 1996; 2000; 2004; 2008; 2012; 2016; 2020; 2024

Other related appearances
- 1906 Intercalated Games

Norway competed at the 1920 Summer Olympics in Antwerp, Belgium. 194 competitors, 188 men and 6 women, took part in 72 events in 16 sports.

== Medalists ==
=== Gold ===
- Helge Løvland — Athletics, Men's Decathlon
- Erik Herseth, Sigurd Holter, Ingar Nielsen, Ole Sørensen, Petter Jamvold, Gunnar Jamvold and Claus Juell — Sailing, Men's 10 metre class (1907 rating)
- Charles Arentz, Willy Gilbert, Robert Giertsen, Arne Sejersted, Halfdan Schjøtt, Trygve Schjøtt and Otto Falkenberg — Sailing, Men's 10 metre class (1919 rating)
- Henrik Østervold, Jan Østervold, Ole Østervold, Hans Næss, Halvor Møgster, Halvor Birkeland, Rasmus Birkeland, Kristian Østervold and Lauritz Christiansen — Sailing, Men's 12 metre class (1907 rating)
- Johan Friele, Olaf Ørvig, Arthur Allers, Christen Wiese, Martin Borthen, Egill Reimers, Kaspar Hassel, Thor Ørvig and Erik Ørvig — Sailing, Men's 12 metre class (1919 rating)
- Andreas Brecke, Paal Kaasen and Ingolf Rød — Sailing, Men's 6 metre class (1919 rating)
- Carl Ringvold, Thorleif Holbye, Tellef Wagle, Kristoffer Olsen and Alf Jacobsen — Sailing, Men's 8 metre class (1907 rating)
- Magnus Konow, Reidar Marthiniussen, Ragnar Vik and Thorleif Christoffersen — Sailing, Men's 8 metre class (1919 rating)
- Ole Lilloe-Olsen — Shooting, Men's 100m running deer, double shots
- Harald Natvig, Ole Lilloe-Olsen, Einar Liberg, Hans Nordvik and Thorstein Johansen — Shooting, Men's Team 100m running deer, double shots
- Otto Olsen — Shooting, Men's 100m running deer, single shot
- Harald Natvig, Otto Olsen, Ole Lilloe-Olsen, Einar Liberg and Hans Nordvik — Shooting, Men's Team 100m running deer, single shot
- Otto Olsen — Shooting, Men's 300m military rifle, prone

=== Silver ===
- Sverre Sørsdal — Boxing, Light-Heavyweight
- Andreas Krogh — Figure skating, Men's singles
- Alexia Bryn and Yngvar Bryn — Figure skating, Pairs
- Men's Team — Gymnastics
- Einar Torgersen, Andreas Knudsen and Leif Erichsen — Sailing, Men's 6 metre class (1907 rating)
- Christian Dick, Sten Abel, Niels Nielsen and Johann Faye — Sailing, Men's 7 metre class
- Jens Salvesen, Lauritz Schmidt, Finn Schiander, Nils Thomas and Ralph Tschudi — Sailing, Men's 8 metre class (1919 rating)
- Otto Olsen, Albert Helgerud, Olaf Sletten, Østen Østensen and Jacob Onsrud — Shooting, Men's Team military rifle, 300m + 600m
- Østen Østensen, Otto Olsen, Olaf Sletten, Gudbrand Skatteboe and Harald Natvig — Shooting, Men's Team free rifle
- Holger Sinding-Larsen

=== Bronze ===
- Martin Stixrud — Figure skating, Men's singles
- Tollef Tollefsen, Thoralf Hagen, Theodor Nag, Conrad Olsen, Adolf Nilsen, Håkon Ellingsen, Thore Michelsen, Arne Mortensen and Karl Nag — Rowing, Men's eight (8+)
- Birger Var, Theodor Klem, Henry Larsen, Per Gulbrandsen and Thoralf Hagen — Rowing, Men's four with coxswain (4+)
- Henrik Agersborg, Trygve Pedersen and Einar Berntsen — Sailing, Men's 6 metre class (1907 rating)
- Einar Liberg — Shooting, Men's 100m running deer, double shots
- Harald Natvig — Shooting, Men's 100m running deer, single shot
- Østen Østensen — Shooting, Men's 300m free rifle, 3 positions
- Østen Østensen, Olaf Sletten, Anton Olsen, Sigvart Johansen and Albert Helgerud — Shooting, Men's Team 50m small bore rifle
- Frithjof Andersen — Wrestling, Greco-Roman lightweight

== Aquatics ==
=== Diving ===
Four divers, two men and two women, represented Norway in 1920. It was the nation's second appearance in the sport. As in 1912, no Norwegian diver advanced to the final. Larsen came closest, placing fourth in her 10-metre platform semifinal; a top three finish was required to advance in all events.

Men

Ranks given are within the semifinal group.

Diver	Event	Semifinals			Final		
Diver	Event	Points	Score	Rank	Points	Score	Rank
Sigvard Andersen	10 m platform	40	264.70	8	Did not advance		
Sigvard Andersen	Plain high dive	21	139.0	5	Did not advance		
Bernard Dahl	Plain high dive	28	136.5	6	Did not advance		

Women

Ranks given are within the semifinal group.

Diver	Event	Semifinals			Final		
Diver	Event	Points	Score	Rank	Points	Score	Rank
Brynhild Berge	10 m platform	29	140.5	6	Did not advance		
Ragnhild Larsen	10 m platform	16	152.0	4	Did not advance		

=== Swimming ===
Two swimmers, both men, represented Norway in 1920. It was the nation's second appearance in the sport. Neither swimmer advanced past the first round in any of their events.

Ranks given are within the heat.

Men

Swimmer	Event	Quarterfinals		Semifinals		Final	
Swimmer	Event	Result	Rank	Result	Rank	Result	Rank
Alfred Steen	100 m free	Unknown	5	Did not advance			
Alfred Steen	400 m free	6:30.6	4	Did not advance			
Asbjørn Wang	100 m back	N/A		1:28.2	4	Did not advance	

== Athletics ==
16 athletes represented Norway in the nation's independent Olympic debut in 1920. It was the nation's fourth appearance in athletics, a sport in which Norway had competed each time the country had appeared at the Olympics. Løvland won Norway's only athletics medal, taking the gold in the decathlon.

Ranks given are within the heat.

Athlete	Event	Heats		Quarterfinals		Semifinals		Final	
Athlete	Event	Result	Rank	Result	Rank	Result	Rank	Result	Rank
Erling Aastad	Long jump	6.62	6 Q	—N/a				6.885	5
Kaare Bache	Triple jump	13.64	9	—N/a				Did not advance	
Asle Bækkedahl	100 m		5	Did not advance					
Bjarne Guldager	100 m		4	Did not advance					
Bjarne Guldager	200 m		5	Did not advance					
Johan Johannesen	Long jump	6.565	10	—N/a				Did not advance	
Johan Johansen	100 m	11.2	4	Did not advance					
Erling Juul	Triple jump	13.59	11	—N/a				Did not advance	
Odolf Larsen	800 m	—N/a		2:01.6	6	Did not advance			
Helge Løvland	Pentathlon	—N/a						27	5
Helge Løvland	Decathlon	—N/a						6803.355	1st place, gold medalist(s)
Einar Mangset	400 m	51.4	4	Did not advance					
Einar Ræder	Long jump	6.585	8	—N/a				Did not advance	
Einar Ræder	Decathlon	—N/a						Did not finish	
Eivind Rasmussen	1500 m	—N/a				Did not finish		Did not advance	
Ole Reistad	Pentathlon	—N/a						Did not finish	
Rolf Stenersen	100 m		3	Did not advance					
Rolf Stenersen	200 m	23.8	4	Did not advance					
Even Vengshoel	Cross country	—N/a						Did not finish	
Erling Vinne	Triple jump	13.34	13	—N/a				Did not advance	
Erling Aastad; Asle Bækkedahl; Bjarne Guldager; Rolf Stenerson	4 × 100 m relay	—N/a				Disqualified		Did not advance	

== Boxing ==
14 boxers represented Norway at the 1920 Games. It was the nation's debut in boxing. Sørsdal won the nation's first Olympic boxing medal with a silver in the light heavyweight class.

Boxer	Weight class	Round of 32	Round of 16	Quarterfinals	Semifinals	Final / Bronze match	
Boxer	Weight class	Opposition Score	Opposition Score	Opposition Score	Opposition Score	Opposition Score	Rank
Johan Clementz	Light heavyweight	N/A	Holdstock (RSA); L	Did not advance			9
Paul Erdal	Featherweight	Bye	Adams (GBR); W	Fritsch (FRA); L	Did not advance		5
Sigurd Hoel	Heavyweight	N/A	Bye	Eluère (FRA); L	Did not advance		5
Rolf Jacobsen	Middleweight	Bye	Lagonia (USA); L	Did not advance			9
Peder Kjellberg	Flyweight	N/A	Charpentier (BEL); L	Did not advance			9
John Koss	Bantamweight	N/A	Bye	McKenzie (GBR); L	Did not advance		5
Einar Nilsen	Flyweight	N/A	Genaro (USA); L	Did not advance			9
Hjalmar Nygaard	Bantamweight	N/A	Ricard (FRA); L	Did not advance			9
Arthur Olsen	Featherweight	Bye	Gachet (FRA); L	Did not advance			9
Johan Sæterhaug	Lightweight	N/A	Gilmour (GBR); W	Newton (CAN); L	Did not advance		5
Sverre Sørsdal	Light heavyweight	N/A	Darbou (FRA); W	Schell (USA); W	Brown (GBR); W	Eagan (USA); L	2nd place, silver medalist(s)
Aage Steen	Welterweight	Della Valle (ITA); W	Richards (FRA); W	Schneider (CAN); L	Did not advance		5
Trygve Stokstad	Welterweight	Bye	Ingram (RSA); W	Clark (USA); L	Did not advance		5
Hjalmar Strømme	Middleweight	Bye	Dortet (FRA); W	Olsen (DEN); W	Prud'Homme (CAN); L	Herscovitch (CAN); L	4

Opponent nation	Wins	Losses	Percent
Belgium	0	1	.000
Canada	0	4	.000
Denmark	1	0	1.000
France	3	4	.429
Great Britain	3	1	.750
Italy	1	0	1.000
South Africa	1	1	.500
United States	1	4	.200
Total	10	15	.400

Round	Wins	Losses	Percent
Round of 32	1	0	1.000
Round of 16	6	6	.500
Quarterfinals	2	6	.250
Semifinals	1	1	.500
Final	0	1	.000
Bronze match	0	1	.000
Total	10	15	.400

== Cycling ==
Four cyclists represented Norway in 1920. It was the nation's second appearance in the sport. All four competed in the road time trial, with Flatby coming in 28th to be the best Norwegian cyclist at the Games. The team came in eighth overall in combined time.

=== Road cycling ===
Cyclist	Event	Final	
Cyclist	Event	Result	Rank
Helge Flatby	Time trial	5:12:50.2	28
Paul Henrichsen	Time trial	5:13:23.2	29
Olaf Nygaard	Time trial	5:24:56.6	35
Thorstein Stryken	Time trial	5:44:01.8	41
Helge Flatby; Paul Henrichsen; Olaf Nygaard; Thorstein Stryken	Team time trial	21:35:11.8	8

== Equestrian ==
Equestrian	Horse	Event	Final	
Equestrian	Horse	Event	Result	Rank
Jens Falkenberg	Hjördis	Dressage	22.375	8
Paul Michelet	Raven	Jumping	5.00	4
Eugen Johansen	Nökken	Jumping	9.00	13
Knut Gysler	Emden	Eventing	1537.50	9
Eugen Johansen	Nökken	Eventing	1428.75	11
Bjørn Bjørnseth	Lydia	Eventing	Did not finish	
Knut Gysler; Eugen Johansen; Bjørn Bjørnseth	Emden; Nökken; Lydia	Team eventing	Did not finish	

== Football ==
Norway competed in the Olympic football tournament for the second time. The country's first Olympic victory was a stunning 3–1 win over Great Britain, the previously undefeated winner of three gold medals in three attempts. It would also turn out to be Norway's only victory in 1920, as the team was defeated by Czechoslovakia in the quarterfinals and by Italy in the first round of the consolation tournament.

First round

August 28, 1920

Norway	3–1	Great Britain
Gundersen 13' 51'; Wilhelms 63'	Report	Nicholas 25'

Olympisch Stadion, Antwerp
Attendance: 5,000
Referee: Johannes Mutters (NED)

Quarterfinals

August 29, 1920

Czechoslovakia	4–0	Norway
Vanik 8'; Janda 17' 66' 77'	Report

La Butte, Brussels
Attendance: 4,000
Referee: Charles Barette (BEL)

Consolation first round

August 31, 1920

Italy	2–1	Norway
Sardi 46'; Badini 96'	Report	Andersen 41'

Broodstraat, Antwerp
Attendance: 500
Referee: Louis Fourgous (FRA)

Final rank
8th

== Gymnastics ==
Twenty-six gymnasts represented Norway in 1920. It was the nation's third appearance in the sport. Norway entered a team in the free system competition; competing against only Denmark, the Norwegians took second place and the silver medal. Hol was the only gymnast to enter the individual competition, placing fourteenth of twenty-five.

=== Artistic gymnastics ===
Gymnast	Event	Final	
Gymnast	Event	Result	Rank
Petter Hol	All-around	80.75	14
Alf Aaning; Karl Aas; Jörgen Andersen; Gustav Bayer; Jørgen Bjørnstad; Asbjørn Bodahl; Trygve Boyesen; Eilert Bøhm; Ingolf Davidsen; Haakon Endreson; Jacob Erstad; Harald Faerstad; Hermann Helgesen; Petter Hol; John Johansen; Otto Johannesen; Torbjörn Kristofferson; Henrik Nielsen; Jacob Opdahl; Arthur Rydstrøm; Bjørn Skjærpe; Wilhelm Steffensen; Olav Sundal; Frithjof Sælen; Reidar Tønsberg; Lauritz Wigand-Larsen	Team, free system	48.55	2nd place, silver medalist(s)

== Modern pentathlon ==
Two pentathletes represented Norway in 1920. It was the nation's second appearance in the sport, having competed at both instances of the Olympic modern pentathlon.

A point-for-place system was used, with the lowest total score winning.

Pentathlete	Final						
Pentathlete	Riding	Fencing	Shooting	Swimming	Running	Total	Rank
Olliver Smith	8	9	17	22	6	65	14
Arne Tellefsen	2	10	20	19	13	62	13

== Rowing ==
Thirteen rowers represented Norway in 1920. It was the nation's third appearance in the sport. Both boats earned bronze medals, matching the nation's best results to that time. The coxed fours boat took third place in the final, while the eights team earned their bronze as the best of two losing semifinalists.

Ranks given are within the heat.

Rower	Cox	Event	Quarterfinals		Semifinals		Final	
Rower	Cox	Event	Result	Rank	Result	Rank	Result	Rank
Per Gulbrandsen; Theodor Klem; Henry Larsen; Birger Var	Thoralf Hagen	Coxed four	N/A		7:14.0	1 Q	7:02.0	3rd place, bronze medalist(s)
Håkon Ellingsen; Thore Michelsen; Arne Mortensen; Karl Nag; Theodor Nag; Adolf Nilsen; Conrad Olsen; Tollef Tollefsen	Thoralf Hagen	Eight	6:32.2	1 Q	6:36.0	2	Did not advance	3rd place, bronze medalist(s)

== Sailing ==
Fifty-nine sailors represented Norway in 1920, by far the most of any country (Belgium was next, with fourteen). It was the nation's third appearance in the sport. Norway took seven gold medals (five uncontested), three silvers, and a bronze.

Sailors	Class	Race 1		Race 2		Race 3		Total	
Sailors	Class	Result	Rank	Result	Rank	Result	Rank	Score	Rank
Henrik Agersborg; Einar Berntsen; Trygve Pedersen	6 metre (1907)	Unknown							3rd place, bronze medalist(s)
Andreas Brecke; Paal Kaasen; Ingolf Rød	6 metre (1919)	Unknown							1st place, gold medalist(s)
Leif Erichsen; Andreas Knudsen; Einar Torgersen	6 metre (1907)	Unknown							2nd place, silver medalist(s)
Sten Abel; Christian Dick; Johan Faye; Niels Nielsen	7 metre	Unknown							2nd place, silver medalist(s)
Thorleif Christoffersen; Magnus Konow; Reidar Marthiniussen; Ragnar Vik	8 metre (1919)	Unknown							1st place, gold medalist(s)
Thorleif Holbye; Alf Jacobsen; Kristoffer Olsen; Carl Ringvold; Tellef Wagle	8 metre (1907)	Unknown							1st place, gold medalist(s)
Jens Salvesen; Finn Schiander; Lauritz Schmidt; Nils Thomas; Ralph Tschudi	8 metre (1919)	Unknown							2nd place, silver medalist(s)
Charles Arentz; Otto Falkenberg; Robert Giertsen; Willy Gilbert; Halfdan Schjøtt; Trygve Schjøtt; Arne Sejersted	10 metre (1919)	Unknown							1st place, gold medalist(s)
Erik Herseth; Sigurd Holter; Gunnar Jamvold; Petter Jamvold; Claus Juell; Ingar Nielsen; Ole Sørensen	10 metre (1907)	Unknown							1st place, gold medalist(s)
Halvor Birkeland; Rasmus Birkeland; Lauritz Christiansen; Halvor Møgster; Hans Næss; Henrik Østervold; Jan Østervold; Kristian Østervold; Ole Østervold	12 metre (1907)	Unknown							1st place, gold medalist(s)
Arthur Allers; Martin Borthen; Johan Friele; Kaspar Hassel; Erik Ørvig; Olaf Ørvig; Thor Ørvig; Egill Reimers; Christen Wiese	12 metre (1919)	Unknown							1st place, gold medalist(s)

== Skating ==
=== Figure skating ===
Six figure skaters represented Norway in 1920. It was the nation's debut in the sport. The Norwegian skaters took three medals in the men's singles and the pairs, but finished without a gold medal.

Skater	Event	Final	
Skater	Event	Result	Rank
Ingrid Gulbrandsen	Ladies' singles	24.0	6
Andreas Krogh	Men's singles	18.0	2nd place, silver medalist(s)
Margot Moe	Ladies' singles	22.5	5
Martin Stixrud	Men's singles	24.5	3rd place, bronze medalist(s)
Alexia Bryn; Yngvar Bryn	Pairs	15.5	2nd place, silver medalist(s)

== Shooting ==
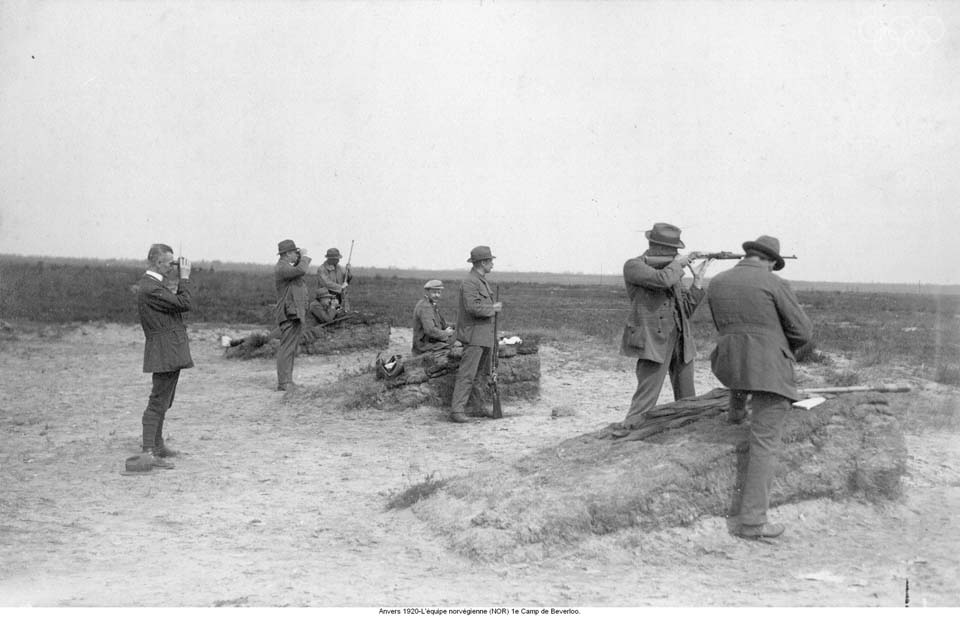
Norvegian shooting team

Sixteen shooters represented Norway in 1920. It was the nation's fourth appearance in the sport as well as the Olympics. Norway took all four gold medals in the running deer events. Lilloe-Olsen was on both of the gold medal teams, as well as taking the individual gold in the double shots version. Otto Olsen was on the single shots team, took gold in the individual version of that event, and added a third gold in the prone 300 metre military rifle as well as being on two silver medal rifle teams. In all, the nation won 11 medals, more than any other country except the United States.

Shooter	Event	Final	
Shooter	Event	Result	Rank
Anton Dahl	300 m military rifle, standing	52	Unknown
Albert Helgerud	50 m small-bore rifle	375	Unknown
Albert Helgerud	300 m free rifle, 3 pos.	955	Unknown
Albert Helgerud	300 m military rifle, prone	58	6
Sigvart Johansen	50 m small-bore rifle	373	Unknown
Einar Liberg	50 m free pistol	442	Unknown
Einar Liberg	100 m deer, double shots	71	3rd place, bronze medalist(s)
Ole Lilloe-Olsen	100 m deer, double shots	82	1st place, gold medalist(s)
Harald Natvig	100 m deer, single shots	41	3rd place, bronze medalist(s)
Nordal Lunde	Trap	85	7
Anton Olsen	50 m small-bore rifle	379	Unknown
Otto Olsen	300 m free rifle, 3 pos.	908	Unknown
Otto Olsen	300 m military rifle, prone	60	1st place, gold medalist(s)
Otto Olsen	100 m deer, single shots	43	1st place, gold medalist(s)
Østen Østensen	50 m small-bore rifle	368	Unknown
Østen Østensen	300 m free rifle, 3 pos.	980	3rd place, bronze medalist(s)
Gudbrand Skatteboe	300 m free rifle, 3 pos.	975	5
Olaf Sletten	50 m small-bore rifle	371	Unknown
Olaf Sletten	300 m free rifle, 3 pos.	930	Unknown
Olaf Sletten	300 m military rifle, prone	58	6
Olaf Sletten	600 m military rifle, prone	58	5
Oluf Wesmann-Kjær	50 m free pistol	434	Unknown
Albert Helgerud; Sigvart Johansen; Anton Olsen; Østen Østensen; Olaf Sletten	50 m team small-bore rifle	1866	3rd place, bronze medalist(s)
Albert Helgerud; Otto Olsen; Østen Østensen; Gudbrand Skatteboe; Olaf Sletten	Team free rifle	4748	2nd place, silver medalist(s)
Albert Helgerud; Otto Olsen; Østen Østensen; Gudbrand Skatteboe; Olaf Sletten	300 m team military rifle, standing	242	6
Albert Helgerud; Otto Olsen; Jacob Onsrud; Østen Østensen; Olaf Sletten	300 m team military rifle, prone	280	6
Albert Helgerud; Otto Olsen; Jacob Onsrud; Østen Østensen; Olaf Sletten	600 m team military rifle, prone	282	4
Albert Helgerud; Otto Olsen; Jacob Onsrud; Østen Østensen; Olaf Sletten	300 & 600 m team military rifle, prone	565	2nd place, silver medalist(s)
Thorstein Johansen; Einar Liberg; Ole Lilloe-Olsen; Harald Natvig; Hans Nordvik	100 m team deer, double shots	343	1st place, gold medalist(s)
Einar Liberg; Ole Lilloe-Olsen; Harald Natvig; Hans Nordvik; Otto Olsen	100 m team deer, single shots	178	1st place, gold medalist(s)
Thorstein Johansen; Ole Lilloe-Olsen; Harald Natvig; Nordal Lunde; Hans Nordvik; Oluf Wesmann-Kjær	Team clay pigeons	210	7

== Tennis ==
Three tennis players, two men and a woman, competed for Norway in 1920. It was the nation's second appearance in the sport. Each of the three players lost their first singles match. The men, playing as a pair, won a single match to advance to the quarterfinals before being defeated.

Player	Event	Round of 64	Round of 32	Round of 16	Quarterfinals	Semifinals	Finals	Rank
Player	Event	Opposition Score	Opposition Score	Opposition Score	Opposition Score	Opposition Score	Opposition Score	Rank
Caro Dahl	Women's singles	N/A	Bye	Fick (SWE); L 7–5, 6–2	Did not advance			9
Conrad Langaard	Men's singles	de Laveleye (BEL); L 6–2, 2–6, 6–3, 6–3	Did not advance					32
Jack Nielsen	Men's singles	Bye	Colombo (ITA); L 6–2, 6–3, 6–1	Did not advance				17
Conrad Langaard; Jack Nielsen	Men's doubles	N/A	Bye	Andersson & Müller (SWE); W 6–1, 6–8, 6–1, 6–4	Blanchy & Brugnon (FRA); L 6–1, 6–1, 6–3	Did not advance		5

Opponent nation	Wins	Losses	Percent
Belgium	0	1	.000
France	0	1	.000
Italy	0	1	.000
Sweden	1	1	.500
Total	1	4	.200

Round	Wins	Losses	Percent
Round of 64	0	1	.000
Round of 32	0	1	.000
Round of 16	1	1	.500
Quarterfinals	0	1	.000
Semifinals	0	0	–
Final	0	0	–
Bronze match	0	0	–
Total	1	4	.200

== Wrestling ==
Seven wrestlers competed for Norway in 1920. It was the nation's third appearance in the sport. Andersen was the only medalist, taking a bronze in the Greco-Roman lightweight. Johnsen almost added another in the middleweight, but lost the bronze medal match to finish fourth.

=== Freestyle ===
Wrestler	Event	Round of 32	Round of 16	Quarterfinals	Semifinals	Finals / Bronze match	Rank
Gudmund Grimstad	Middleweight	Bye	Lindgren (SWE) (W)	Johnson (USA) (L)	Did not advance		5

Opponent nation	Wins	Losses	Percent
Sweden	1	0	1.000
United States	0	1	.000
Total	1	1	.500

Round	Wins	Losses	Percent
Round of 32	0	0	–
Round of 16	1	0	1.000
Quarterfinals	0	1	.000
Semifinals	0	0	–
Final	0	0	–
Bronze match	0	0	–
Total	1	1	.500

=== Greco-Roman ===
Wrestler	Event	Round of 32	Round of 16	Quarterfinals	Semifinals	Finals	Rank
Wrestler	Event	Round of 32	Round of 16	Silver quarters	Silver semis	Silver match	Rank
Wrestler	Event	Round of 32	Round of 16	Bronze quarters	Bronze semis	Bronze match	Rank
Frithjof Andersen	Lightweight	Bye	Lindberg (SWE) (W)	Coerse (NED) (W)	Tamminen (FIN) (L)	Did not advance	3rd place, bronze medalist(s)
Frithjof Andersen	Lightweight	Bye	Lindberg (SWE) (W)	Did not advance			3rd place, bronze medalist(s)
Frithjof Andersen	Lightweight	Bye	Lindberg (SWE) (W)	Frisenfeldt (NED) (W)	Kopřiva (TCH) (W)	Janssens (BEL) (W)	3rd place, bronze medalist(s)
Richard Frydenlund	Lightweight	Bye	Nilsson (SWE) (W)	Tamminen (FIN) (L)	Did not advance		5
Richard Frydenlund	Lightweight	Bye	Nilsson (SWE) (W)	Did not advance			5
Richard Frydenlund	Lightweight	Bye	Nilsson (SWE) (W)	Bye	Janssens (BEL) (L)	Did not advance	5
Sjur Johnsen	Middleweight	Bye	Lindfors (FIN) (L)	Did not advance			4
Sjur Johnsen	Middleweight	Bye	Lindfors (FIN) (L)	Did not advance			4
Sjur Johnsen	Middleweight	Bye	Lindfors (FIN) (L)	Szymanski (USA) (W)	Christensen (DEN) (W)	Perttilä (FIN) (L)	4
Wilhelm Olsen	Featherweight	Bye	Pütsep (EST) (L)	Did not advance			11
Wilhelm Olsen	Featherweight	Bye	Pütsep (EST) (L)	N/A	Did not advance		11
Wilhelm Olsen	Featherweight	Bye	Pütsep (EST) (L)	Did not advance			11
Einar Stensrud	Middleweight	Bye	Notaris (GRE) (W)	Szymanski (USA) (L)	Did not advance		11
Einar Stensrud	Middleweight	Bye	Notaris (GRE) (W)	Did not advance			11
Einar Stensrud	Middleweight	Bye	Notaris (GRE) (W)	Did not advance			11
Harald Vassboten	Heavyweight	Bye	Calza (ITA) (W)	Ahlgren (SWE) (L)	Did not advance		10
Harald Vassboten	Heavyweight	Bye	Calza (ITA) (W)	Did not advance			10
Harald Vassboten	Heavyweight	Bye	Calza (ITA) (W)	Did not advance			10

Opponent nation	Wins	Losses	Percent
Belgium	1	1	.500
Czechoslovakia	1	0	1.000
Denmark	1	0	1.000
Estonia	0	1	.000
Finland	0	4	.000
Greece	1	0	1.000
Italy	1	0	1.000
Netherlands	2	0	1.000
Sweden	2	1	.667
United States	1	1	.500
Total	10	8	.556

Round	Wins	Losses	Percent
Round of 32	0	0	–
Round of 16	4	2	.667
Quarterfinals	1	3	.250
Semifinals	0	1	.000
Final	0	0	–
Silver quarterfinals	0	0	–
Silver semifinals	0	0	–
Silver match	0	0	–
Bronze quarterfinals	2	0	1.000
Bronze semifinals	2	1	.667
Bronze match	1	1	.500
Total	10	8	.556
