= Sailing at the 1920 Summer Olympics – 12 Metre =

12 Metre at the Games of the VII Olympiad
- Line drawing of the 12 Metre (1907 Rule)
- Venue: Belgium, Ostend
- Dates: First race: 7 July 1920; Last race: 9 July 1920
- Competitors: 18 from 1 nation
- Teams: 2

Medalists
1st place, gold medalist(s)		(1907 Rule); Henrik Østervold, Halvor Birkeland, Rasmus Birkeland, Lauritz Christiansen, Hans Næss, Halvor Møgster, Jan Østervold, Kristian Østervold, Ole Østervold	Norway
1st place, gold medalist(s)		(1919 Rule); Johan Friele, Arthur Allers, Martin Borthen, Kaspar Hassel, Erik Ørvig, Olaf Ørvig, Thor Ørvig, Egill Reimers, Christen Wiese	Norway

The 12-metre class was a sailing event on the Sailing at the 1920 Summer Olympics program in Ostend. Two type of 12 Metre classes were used. Four races were scheduled in each type. In total 18 sailors, on 2 boats, from 1 nation entered in the 12 Metre.

== Race schedule ==
●	Opening ceremony	●	Event competitions	●	Event finals	●	Closing ceremony

Date	July			
Date	7th Wed	8th Thu	9th Fri	10th Sat
12 Metre	●	●	●	●
Total gold medals				2

== Course area ==
12 Metre 1920 Olympic Course Areas

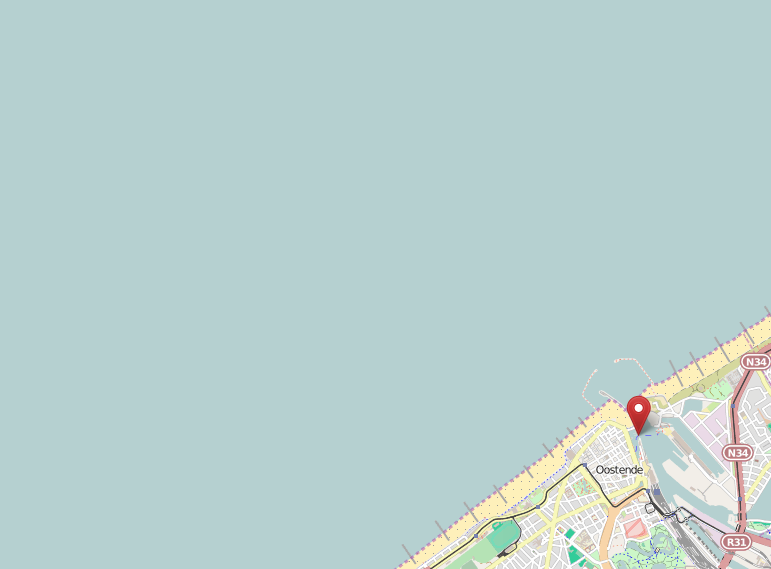
Ostend, Belgium

== Weather conditions ==
Date	Max temperature	Wind speed	Average wind direction
7 July 1920	Unknown		
8 July 1920	Unknown		
9 July 1920	Unknown		

== Final results ==
The 1920 Olympic scoring system was used. All competitors were male.

=== 12 Metre International Rule 1907 ===
Rank	Country	Helmsman	Crew	Boat	Race 1		Race 2		Total
Rank	Country	Helmsman	Crew	Boat	Pos.	Pts.	Pos.	Pts.	Total
1st place, gold medalist(s)	Norway	Henrik Østervold	Halvor Birkeland; Rasmus Birkeland; Lauritz Christiansen; Hans Næss; Halvor Møgster; Jan Østervold; Kristian Østervold; Ole Østervold	Atlanta	Sailed over	1	Sailed over	1	2

=== 12 Metre International Rule 1919 ===
Rank	Country	Helmsman	Crew	Boat	Race 1		Race 2		Total
Rank	Country	Helmsman	Crew	Boat	Pos.	Pts.	Pos.	Pts.	Total
1st place, gold medalist(s)	Norway	Johan Friele	Arthur Allers; Martin Borthen; Kaspar Hassel; Erik Ørvig; Olaf Ørvig; Thor Ørvig; Egill Reimers; Christen Wiese	Heira II	Sailed over	1	Sailed over	1	2

== Notes ==
- Since the official documentation of the 1920 Summer Olympics was written in 1957 many facts did disappear in time.
- Two type of 12 Metre classes were used. Those measured under the International Rule 1907 and one under the International Rule 1919.

== Other information ==
=== Sailors ===
During the Sailing regattas at the 1920 Summer Olympics the following persons were competing:

12 Metre sailors at the 1920 Olympic Games
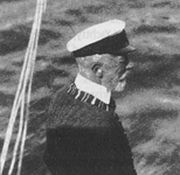
Henrik Østervold (NOR)

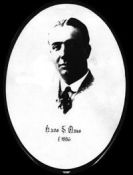
Hans Næss (NOR)

=== Podium (1907 Rule) ===
Medalist 12 Metre, International Rule 1907
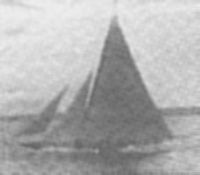
Norway (gold) Atlanta
