= Sailing at the 1920 Summer Olympics – 8 Metre =

8 Metre at the Games of the VII Olympiad
- Line drawings of the 8 Metre (1907 Rule and 1919 Rule)
- Venue: Belgium, Ostend
- Dates: First race: 7 July 1920; Last race: 9 July 1920
- Competitors: 19 from 2 nations
- Teams: 4

Medalists
1st place, gold medalist(s)		(1907 Rule); Carl Ringvold, Thorleif Holbye, Alf Jacobsen, Kristoffer Olsen, Tellef Wagle	Norway
1st place, gold medalist(s)		(1919 Rule); Magnus Konow, Thorleif Christoffersen, Reidar Marthiniussen, Ragnar Vik	Norway
2nd place, silver medalist(s)		(1919 Rule); Jens Salvesen, Finn Schiander, Lauritz Schmidt, Nils Thomas, Ralph Tschudi	Norway
3rd place, bronze medalist(s)		(1919 Rule); Albert Grisar, Willy de l'Arbre, Georges Hellebuyck, Léopold Standaert, Henri Weewauters	Belgium

The 8 Metre was a sailing event on the Sailing at the 1920 Summer Olympics program in Ostend. Two type of 8 Metre classes were used. Four races were scheduled in each type. In total 19 sailors, on 4 boats, from 2 nation entered in the 8 Metre.

== Race schedule ==
●	Opening ceremony	●	Event competitions	●	Event finals	●	Closing ceremony

Date	July			
Date	7th Wed	8th Thu	9th Fri	10th Sat
8 Metre	●	●	●	●
Total gold medals				2

== Course area ==
8 Metre 1920 Olympic Course Areas

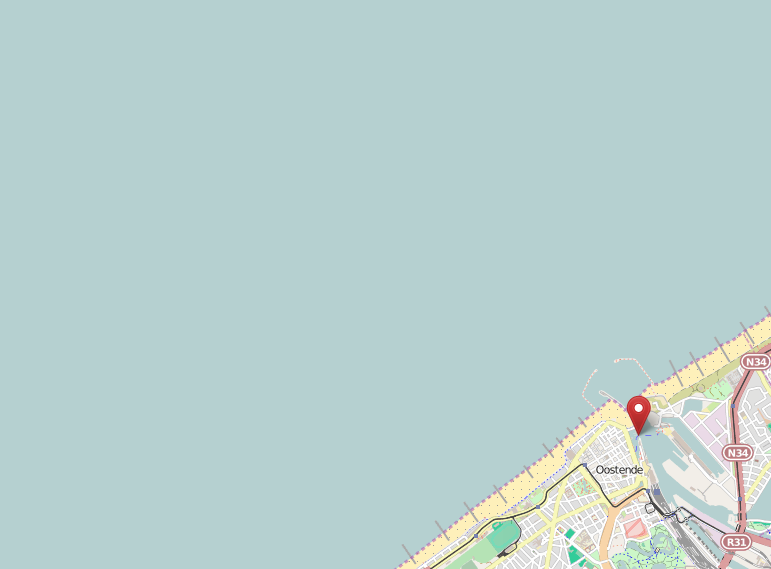
Ostend, Belgium

== Weather conditions ==
Date	Max temperature	Wind speed	Average wind direction
7 July 1920	Unknown		
8 July 1920	Unknown		
9 July 1920	Unknown		

== Final results ==
The 1920 Olympic scoring system was used. All competitors were male.

=== 8 Metre International Rule 1907 ===
Rank	Country	Helmsman	Crew	Boat	Race 1		Race 2		Total
Rank	Country	Helmsman	Crew	Boat	Pos.	Pts.	Pos.	Pts.	Total
1st place, gold medalist(s)	Norway	Carl Ringvold	Thorleif Holbye; Alf Jacobsen; Kristoffer Olsen; Tellef Wagle	Irene	Sailed over	1	Sailed over	1	2

=== 8 Metre International Rule 1919 ===
Rank	Country	Helmsman	Crew	Boat	Race 1		Race 2		Race 3		Total
Rank	Country	Helmsman	Crew	Boat	Pos.	Pts.	Pos.	Pts.	Pos.	Pts.	Total
1st place, gold medalist(s)	Norway	Magnus Konow	Thorleif Christoffersen; Reidar Marthiniussen; Ragnar Vik	Sildra	1	1	1	1	1	1	3
2nd place, silver medalist(s)	Norway	Jens Salvesen	Finn Schiander; Lauritz Schmidt; Nils Thomas; Ralph Tschudi	Lyn	2	2	2	2	2	2	6
3rd place, bronze medalist(s)	Belgium	Albert Grisar	Willy de l'Arbre; Georges Hellebuyck; Léopold Standaert; Henri Weewauters	Antwerpia V	3	3	3	3	3	3	9

=== Daily standings ===
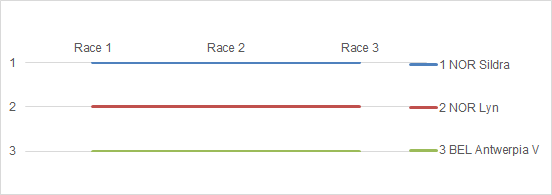
Graph showing the daily standings in the 8 Metre (1919) during the 1920 Summer Olympics

== Notes ==
- Since the official documentation of the 1920 Summer Olympics was written in 1957 many facts did disappear in time.
- Two type of 8 Metre classes were used. Those measured under the International Rule 1907 and one under the International Rule 1919.

== Other information ==
=== Sailors ===
During the Sailing regattas at the 1920 Summer Olympics the following persons were competing:

8 Metre sailors at the 1920 Olympic Games
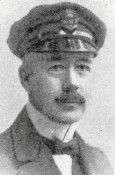
Carl Ringvold (NOR)

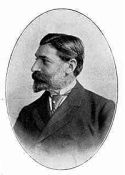
Thorleif Holbye (NOR)

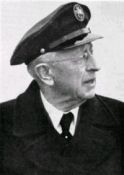
Magnus Konow (NOR)

=== Podium (1919 Rule) ===
Medalists 8 Metre, International Rule 1919
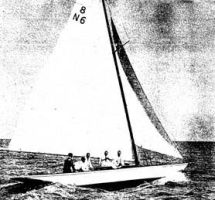
Norway (silver) Lyn

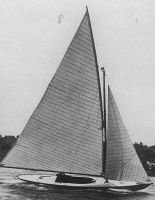
Norway (gold) Sildra

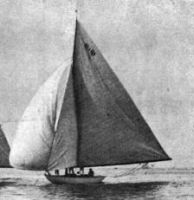
Belgium (bronze) Antwerpia V
