= Sailing at the 1920 Summer Olympics – 7 Metre =

7 Metre at the Games of the VII Olympiad
- Line drawings of the 7 Metre
- Venue: Belgium, Ostend
- Dates: First race: 7 July 1920; Last race: 9 July 1920
- Competitors: 8 from 2 nations
- Teams: 2

Medalists
1st place, gold medalist(s)		Cyril Wright, Dorothy Wright, Robert Coleman, William Maddison	Great Britain
2nd place, silver medalist(s)		Johan Faye, Sten Abel, Christian Dick, Niels Neilsen	Norway

The 7 Metre was a sailing event on the Sailing at the 1920 Summer Olympics program in Ostend. Four races were scheduled in each type. In total 8 sailors, on 2 boats, from 2 nation entered in the 7 Metre.

== Race schedule ==
●	Opening ceremony	●	Event competitions	●	Event finals	●	Closing ceremony

Date	July			
Date	7th Wed	8th Thu	9th Fri	10th Sat
7 Metre	●	●	●	●
Total gold medals				1

== Course area ==
7 Metre 1920 Olympic Course Areas

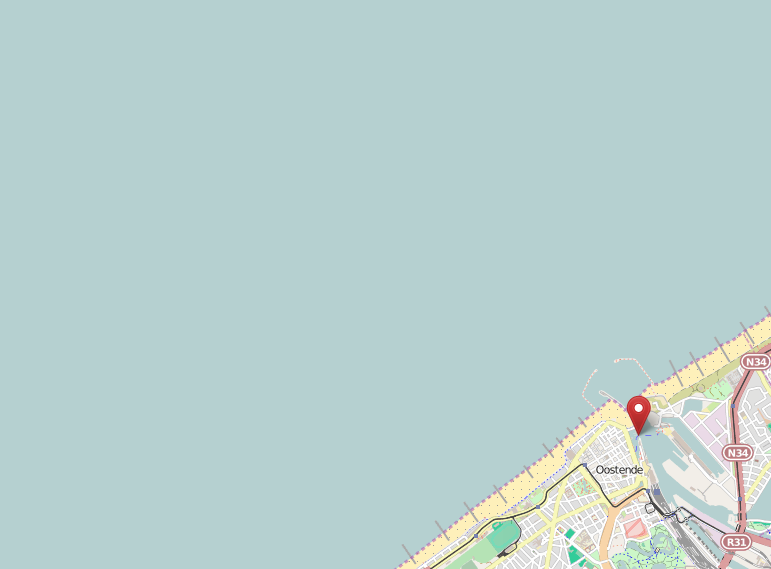
Ostend, Belgium

== Weather conditions ==
Date	Max temperature	Wind speed	Average wind direction
7 July 1920	Unknown		
8 July 1920	Unknown		
9 July 1920	Unknown		

== Final results ==
The 1920 Olympic scoring system was used.

Rank	Country	Helmsman	Crew	Boat	Race 1		Race 2		Race 3		Total
Rank	Country	Helmsman	Crew	Boat	Pos.	Pts.	Pos.	Pts.	Pos.	Pts.	Total
1st place, gold medalist(s)	Great Britain	Cyril Wright	Robert Coleman; William Maddison; Dorothy Wright	Ancora	2	2	1	1	1	1	4
2nd place, silver medalist(s)	Norway	Johan Faye	Sten Abel; Christian Dick; Niels Nielsen	Fornebo	1	1	2	2	2	2	5

Legend:
Gender: – male; – female;

== Daily standings ==
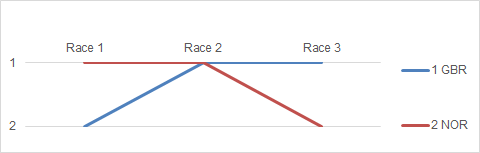
Graph showing the daily standings in the 7 Metre during the 1920 Summer Olympics

== Notes ==
- Since the official documentation of the 1920 Summer Olympics was written in 1957 many facts did disappear in time.

== Other information ==
=== Sailors ===
During the Sailing regattas at the 1920 Summer Olympics the following persons were competing:

7 Metre sailors at the 1920 Olympic Games
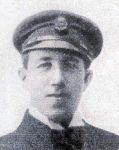
Niels Neilsen (NOR)
