= 7 Metre =

Boat
- Crew: 4
- Draft: 1.9 m (6 ft 3 in)

Hull
- Hull weight: 7,500 kg (16,500 lb)
- LOA: 13 m (43 ft)
- LWL: 8.5 m (28 ft)
- Beam: 2.2 m (7 ft 3 in)

The International Seven Metre Class is a construction class, meaning that the boats are not identical but are all designed to meet specific measurement formula, in this case International Rule. At their heyday, Metre Classes were the most important group of international yacht racing classes, and they are still actively raced around the world. "Seven" in class name does not, somewhat confusingly, refer to length of the boat, but product of the formula; 7 m boats are, on average, 13 meters long.

== History ==
The 7 m was used as an Olympic class during the 1908 and 1920 Olympics. The International Rule was set up in 1907 to replace earlier, simpler handicap system which were often local or at best, national, and often also fairly simple, producing extreme boats which were fast but lightly constructed and impractical. The rule changed several times in history. About 200 boats were ever built.

== Rule development ==
=== 1907 rule ===
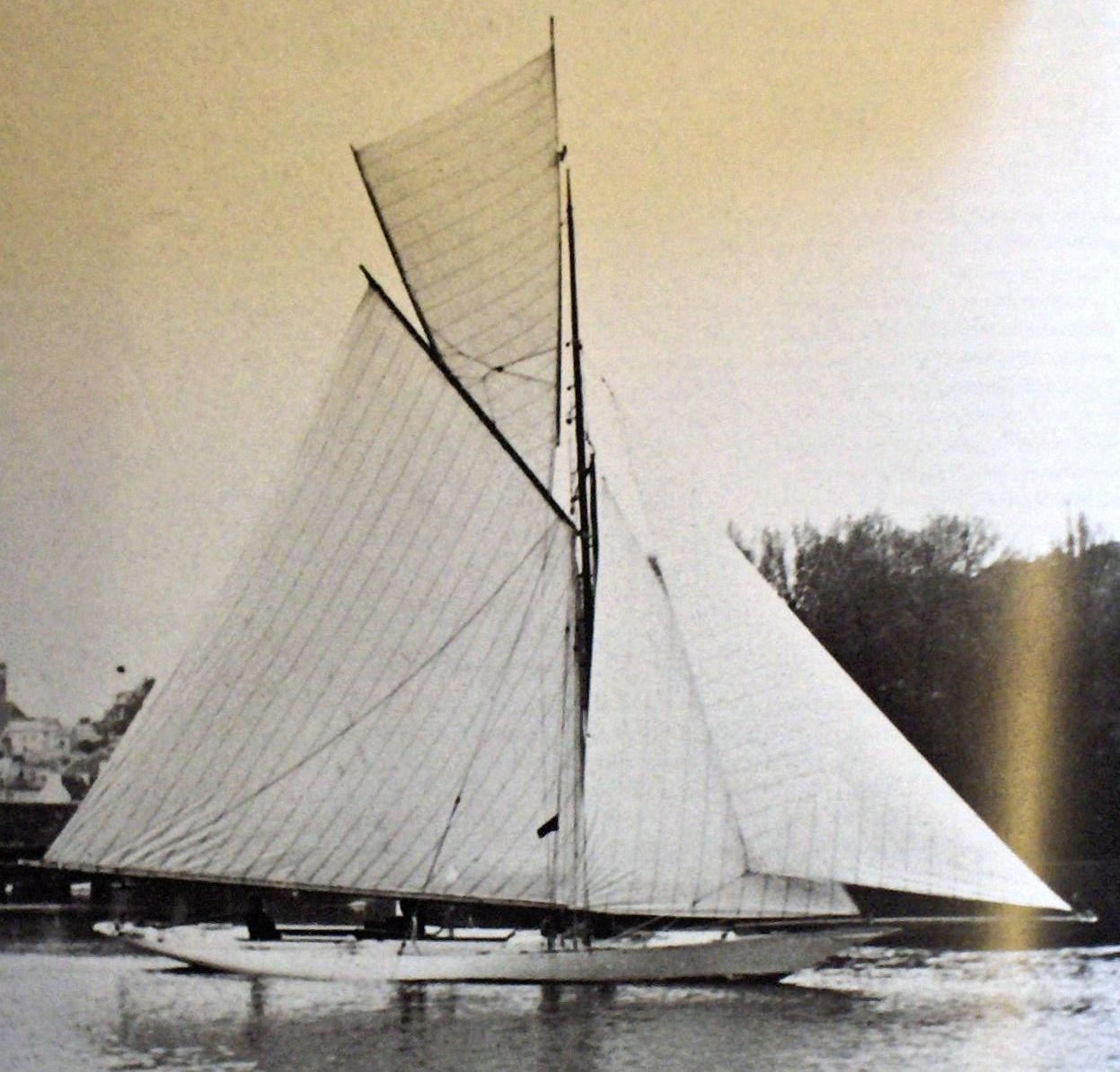
Olympic 7 m yacht "Blue Bird" built in 1910, compliant with the First International Rule

Used from 1907 to 1917.

$$7.000 \mbox{ metres} = \frac{L + B + \frac{1}{3}G +3d + \frac{1}{3}\sqrt{S} - F}{2}$$

where

- $L$ = waterline length (LWL)
- $B$ = beam
- $G$ = chain girth
- $d$ = difference between girth and chain
- $S$ = sail area
- $F$ = freeboard

=== 1919 rule ===
Used from 1920 to 1933.

$$7.000 \mbox{ metres} = \frac{L + 0.25G +2d + \sqrt{S} - F}{2.5}$$

where

- $L$ = waterline length (LWL)
- $G$ = chain girth
- $d$ = difference between girth and chain
- $S$ = sail area
- $F$ = freeboard

== Olympic results ==
Gamest	Gold	Silver	Bronze
1908 London	Great Britain (GBR); Charles Rivett-Carnac; Norman Bingley; Richard Dixon; Frances Rivett-Carnac	The second competitor failed to make it to the start.	No further competition
1920 Antwerp	Great Britain (GBR); Cyril Wright; Robert Coleman; William Maddison; Dorothy Wright	Norway (NOR); Johann Faye; Sten Abel; Christian Dick; Neils Neilsen	No further competitors
