= Sailing at the 1920 Summer Olympics =

Sailing at the Games of the VII Olympiad
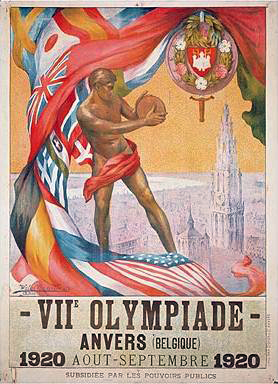
- Poster Anvers 1920
- Venues: Ostend; Amsterdam
- Dates: First race: 7 July 1920 (Ostend); Last race: 10 July 1920; Final race: 3 September 1920 (Amsterdam)
- Competitors: 100 Male and 1 Female from 6 nations
- Boats: 24

Sailing/Yachting is an Olympic sport starting from the Games of the 1st Olympiad (1896 Olympics in Athens, Greece). With the exception of 1904 and the canceled 1916 Summer Olympics, sailing has always been included on the Olympic schedule.

The Sailing program of 1920 was open for a total of sixteen sailing classes (disciplines), with fourteen Sailing events being contested: the 8.5 metre and 9 metre classes were cancelled as there were no entrants. For each class, three races were scheduled from 7 July 1920 to 10 July 1920, off the coast of Ostend at the North Sea.

== Venue ==
Royal Yacht Club of Belgium
- Royal Yacht Club van België
- Burgee of the Royal Yacht Club Belgium

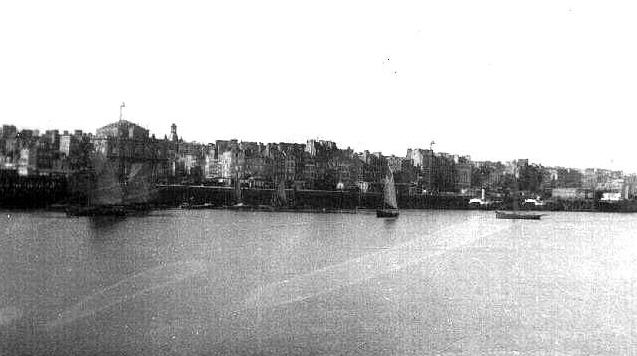
- Interactive map of the Royal Yacht Club of Belgium area

General information
- Status: unknown
- Type: Clubhouse
- Location: Belgium
- Coordinates: 51°14′2″N 2°55′25″E
- Elevation: Sealevel

=== Royal Yacht Club of Belgium ===
Ostend offers fair conditions for sailing on the North Sea. Though there are tidal conditions, the current is reasonably predictable. Local knowledge does not have too much influence of the races. The wind conditions are also good for sailing. However, in the case of the 1920 Summer Olympic regatta's the prevailing breeze did not show. Most races had to be sailed under light air conditions.

An unprecedented and unique Olympic situation happened with the races in the 12' Dinghy. When in the second race one of the marks was taken hostage by the tidal current and went drifting the race had to be nullified. Since the organizers did not have the time to resail the race and both teams were of Dutch origin the Belgian organization requested the Dutch Olympic Committee to resail the finals in The Netherlands. As a result, the first Olympic event held in the Netherlands was not in 1928 but already in 1920. As venue of this final the Buiten IJ in Amsterdam was chosen.

=== Course areas ===
1920 Olympic Course Area

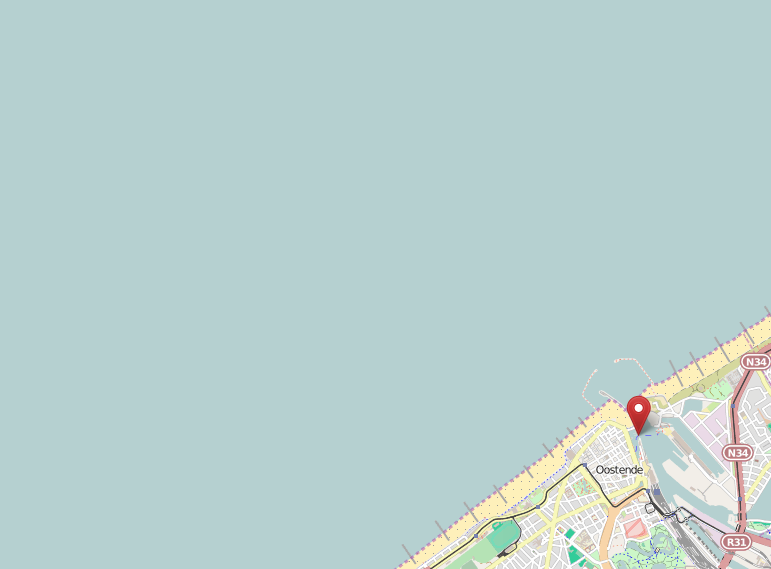
Course area Ostend, Belgium

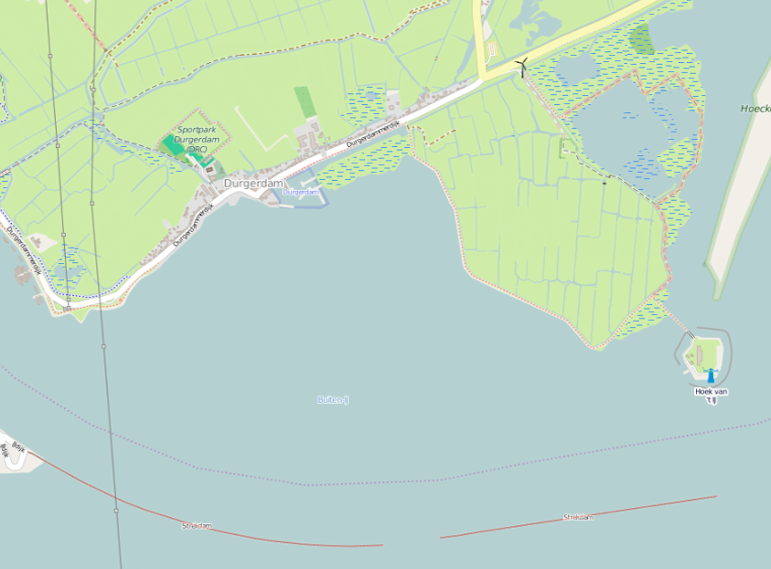
Course area 12' Dinghy, Amsterdam, Netherlands

== Competition ==
=== Overview ===
Continents	Countries	Classes	Entries	Male	Female
1	6	14	24	100	1|-

A maximum of 2 boats per country per class was allowed.

=== Continents ===
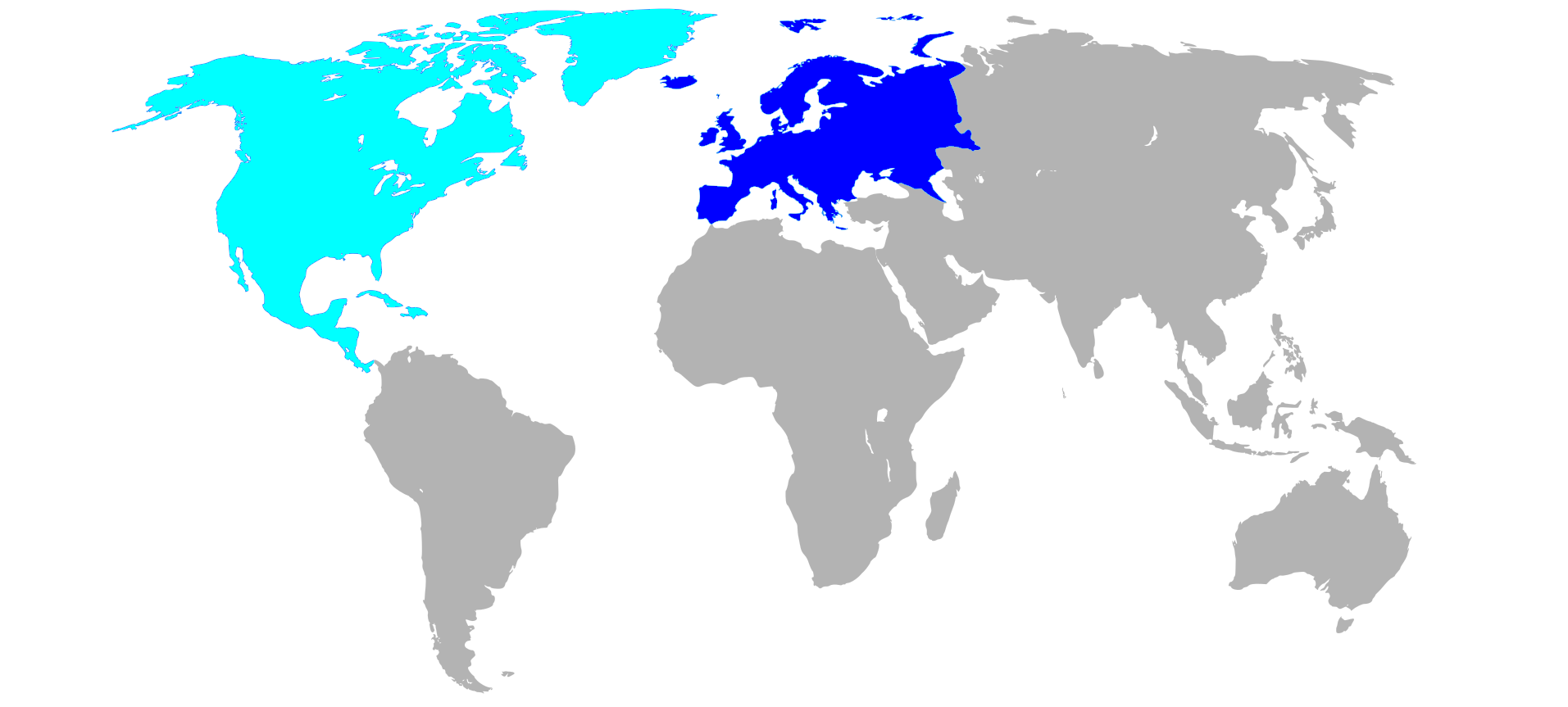
Map of Participating Sailing Continents at the 1920 Summer Olympics ● Green = Participating for the first time ● Blue = Participating ● Light Blue = Have previously participated

● Europe

=== Countries ===
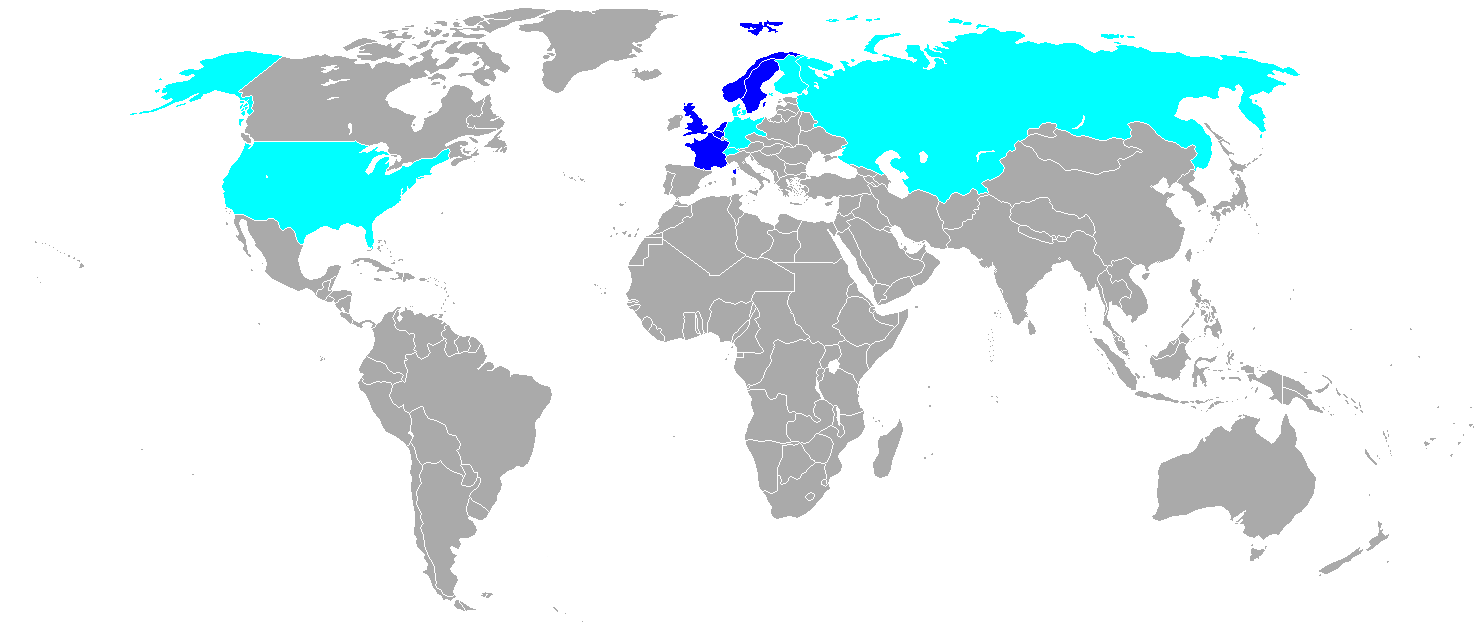
Map of Participating Sailing Countries at the 1920 Summer Olympics ● Green = Participating for the first time ● Blue = Participating ● Light Blue = Have previously participated

- Belgium (14)
- France (3)
- Great Britain (6)
- Netherlands (8)
- Norway (59)
- Sweden (11)

=== Classes (equipment) ===
The Olympic Sailing event of 1920 was without any doubt the most strangest in history so far. With a program of no less than 16 classes and an entry list that consists of 7 out of 14 classes with just competitor and only one class with more than 3 yachts.

After World War I the International Sailing Authority did not know in what direction sailing had developed since 1912. The Nordic countries had developed the Skerry Cruiser classes and the International rule classes had adopted in 1919 a new edition of the rule which was not yet implemented in the countries. Therefore, the entries were open for the old, as well the new rule and two Skerry classes. Besides that, an advice from 1908 was followed by putting two one design classes on the program. By doing this the 1920 Olympics acted as a test laboratory from which the IYRU could draw conclusion for the further development of the sport. These lessons learned, not too many different classes and moving towards one design classes, did show during the next Olympic Sailing event and are still taken into account.

Some of the 1920 Olympic classes
Class	Type	Venue	Event	Sailors	First OG	Olympics so far
12' Dinghy	Dinghy	Ostend		2	1920	1
18' Dinghy	Dinghy	Ostend		2	1920	1
6.5 Metre	Keelboat	Ostend		3	1920	1
8.5 Metre	Keelboat	No show		Unknown	1920	0
6 Metre (2x)	Keelboat	Ostend		3	1908	3
7 Metre	Keelboat	Ostend		2	1908	2
8 Metre (2x)	Keelboat	Ostend		5	1908	3
9 Metre	Keelboat	No show		Unknown	1920	0
10 Metre (2x)	Keelboat	Ostend		8	1912	2
12 Metre (2x)	Keelboat	Ostend		9	1908	3
30m^{2} Skerry Cruiser	Keelboat	Ostend		7	1920	1
40m^{2} Skerry Cruiser	Keelboat	Ostend		8	1920	1
Legend: = Mixed gender event
Some of the 1920 Olympic Classes in action 12' Dinghy 6.5 Metre 6 Metre Skerry Cruiser 12 Metre

== Race schedule ==
●	Opening ceremony	●	Event competitions	●	Event finals	●	Closing ceremony

Date	July Belgium				September Netherlands		
Date	7 Wed	8 Thu	9 Fri	10 Sat	3 Fri	4 Sat	5 Sun
Sailing (planning)	● ● ● ● ● ● ● ● ● ●	● ● ● ● ● ● ● ● ● ●	● ● ● ● ● ● ● ● ● ●	● ● ● ● ● ● ● ● ● ●			
Total gold medals				14			
Sailing (actual)	1 ● ● ● ● ● ● ● ● ●	● ● ● ● ● ● ● ● ●	● ● ● ● ● ● ● ● ●	● ● ● ● ● ● ● ● ●	2		
Total gold medals				13	1		

== Medal summary ==
Event	Gold	Silver	Bronze
1920: 12' Dinghy	Netherlands (NED); Cornelis Hin; Johan Hin; Frans Hin	Netherlands (NED); Arnoud van der Biesen; Petrus Beukers	No further competitors
1920: 18' Dinghy	None awarded		
1920: 6.5 Metre	Netherlands (NED); Joop Carp; Berend Carp; Petrus Wernink	France (FRA); Albert Weil; Robert Monier; Félix Picon	No further competitors
1920: 6 Metre; 1907 rule	Belgium (BEL); Émile Cornellie; Frédéric Bruynseels; Florimond Cornellie	Norway (NOR); Einar Torgersen; Leif Erichsen; Andreas Knudsen	Norway (NOR); Henrik Agersborg; Einar Berntsen; Trygve Pedersen
1920: 6 Metre; 1919 rule	Norway (NOR); Andreas Brecke; Paal Kaasen; Ingolf Rød	Belgium (BEL); Léon Huybrechts; Charles Van Den Bussche; John Klotz	No further competitors
1920: 7 Metre	Great Britain (GBR); Cyril Wright; Robert Coleman; William Maddison; Dorothy Wright	Norway (NOR); Johann Faye; Sten Abel; Christian Dick; Neils Neilsen	No further competitors
1920: 8 Metre; 1907 rule	Norway (NOR); Carl Ringvold; Thorleif Holbye; Alf Jacobsen; Kristoffer Olsen; Tellef Wagle	No further competitors	No further competitors
1920: 8 Metre; 1919 rule	Norway (NOR); Magnus Konow; Thorleif Christoffersen; Reidar Marthiniussen; Ragnar Vik	Norway (NOR); Jens Salvesen; Finn Schiander; Lauritz Schmidt; Nils Thomas; Ralph Tschudi	Belgium (BEL); Albert Grisar; Willy de l'Arbre; Georges Hellebuyck; Léopold Standaert; Henri Weewauters
8.5 Metre	No Entries		
9 Metre	No Entries		
1920: 10 Metre; 1907 rule	Norway (NOR); Erik Herseth; Gunnar Jamvold; Petter Jamvold; Claus Juell; Sigurd Holter; Ingar Nielsen; Ole Sørensen	No further competitors	No further competitors
1920: 10 Metre; 1919 rule	Norway (NOR); Charles Arentz; Otto Falkenberg; Robert Giertsen; Willy Gilbert; Halfdan Schjøtt; Trygve Schjøtt; Arne Sejersted	No further competitors	No further competitors
1920: 12 Metre; 1907 rule	Norway (NOR); Henrik Østervold; Halvor Birkeland; Rasmus Birkeland; Lauritz Christiansen; Hans Naess; Halvor Møgster; Jan Østervold; Kristian Østervold; Ole Østervold	No further competitors	No further competitors
1920: 12 Metre; 1919 rule	Norway (NOR); Johan Friele; Arthur Allers; Martin Borthen; Kaspar Hassel; Erik Ørvig; Olav Örvig; Thor Ørvig; Egill Reimers; Christen Wiese	No further competitors	No further competitors
1920: 30m2 Skerry cruiser	Sweden (SWE); Gösta Lundqvist; Gösta Bengtsson; Rolf Steffenburg	No further competitors	No further competitors
1920: 40m2 Skerry cruiser	Sweden (SWE); Tore Holm; Yngve Holm; Axel Rydin; Georg Tengwall	Sweden (SWE); Gustaf Svensson; Percy Almstedt; Erik Mellbin; Ragnar Svensson	No further competitors

== Medal table ==
Rank	Nation	Gold	Silver	Bronze	Total
1	Norway	7	3	1	11
2	Netherlands	2	1	0	3
2	Sweden	2	1	0	3
4	Belgium	1	1	1	3
5	Great Britain	1	0	0	1
6	France	0	1	0	1
Totals (6 entries)		13	7	2	22

== Other information ==
=== Sailing ===
- As a result of the First World War, AUT, GER, HUN and TUR were not invited.
- The agony athletes develop after finishing fourth at the Olympics must have started at the Olympic Sailing event of 1920. The Belgium 6 Metre team of Louis Depiere, Raymond Bauwens and Willy Valcke finished 4th and became the only sailing team at the 1920 Olympics that went home without a medal.
- In the Sailing regattas, Norway took 7 gold medals. This boost put them in the higher regions of the medal table. They still profit from this boost.

=== Sailors ===
During the Sailing regattas at the 1920 Summer Olympics among others the following persons were competing in the various classes:

Sailors at the 1920 Olympic Games
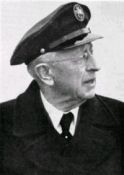
In the 8 Metre Sildra:
Norway, Magnus Konow
six time Olympic competitor

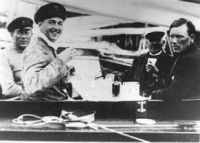
In the 40 M2 Skerry cruiser Sif:
Sweden, Magnus Konow
five time Olympic competitor
