= Thorleif =

The Germanic first name Thorleif (which means son of Thor) with variants Torleif (Swedish), Thorleiv/Torleiv (Norwegian) and Þorleif (Icelandic) may refer to:

== Torleif ==
- Torleif Hoppe (born 1965), co-creator and scriptwriter on Danish crime drama series The Killing and creator of 2019 series DNA
- Torleif Torkildsen (1892–1944), Norwegian gymnast and Olympian

== Torleiv ==
- Torleiv Trondson Benkestok Norwegian nobleman (beginning of 16th century)
- Torleiv Bolstad (1915–1979), Norwegian musician and Hardanger fiddle player
- Torleiv Corneliussen (1890–1975), Norwegian sailor and Olympian
- Torleiv Hannaas (1874–1929), Norwegian philologist
- Torleiv Hytten (1890–1980), Norwegian-Australian economist
- Torleiv Maseng (born 1946), Norwegian engineer
- Torleiv Ole Rognum (born 1948), Norwegian physician and politician for the Christian Democratic Party

== Thorleiv ==
- Thorleiv Røhn (1881–1963), Norwegian gymnast who won a gold medal in the team competition at the 1906 Summer Olympics

== Thorleif ==
- Thorleif Andresen (born 1945), Norwegian cyclist who competed at the 1976 Summer Olympics
- Thorleif Christoffersen (1900–1975), Norwegian sailor who competed in the 1920 Summer Olympics
- Thorleif Enger (born 1943), Norwegian businessperson and chief executive officer of Yara International
- Thorleif Haug (1894–1934), Norwegian skier who competed in Nordic combined and cross-country
- Thorleif Holbye (1883–1963), Norwegian sailor who competed in the 1920 Summer Olympics
- Gunnar Thorleif Hvashovd (born 1924), Norwegian politician for the Labour Party
- Thorleif Karlsen (1909–2010), Norwegian police inspector, who also became known through the radio program Trafikk og musikk
- Thorleif Kristensen (1916–1997), Norwegian politician for the Labour Party
- Thorleif Lund (1880–1956), Norwegian stage and film actor of the silent film era
- Thorleif Lintrup Paus (1912–2006), Norwegian lawyer and diplomat
- Thorleif Rattray Orde Mangin (1896–1950), British colonial administrator
- Thorleif Petersen (1884–1958), Norwegian gymnast who competed in the 1906 Summer Olympics
- Thorleif T. Peterson (1885–1982), American farmer and politician
- Ola Thorleif Ruud (1926–2018), Norwegian politician from the Conservative Party
- Thorleif Schjelderup (1920–2006), Norwegian author and in the 1940s and 1950s one of Norway's best ski jumpers
- Thorleif Frederik Schjelderup (1859–1931), Norwegian businessperson
- Thorleif Schjelderup-Ebbe (1894–1982), Norwegian zoologist who described the pecking order of hens
- Thorleif Torstensson, leader of Thorleifs, a Swedish dansband active 1962–2012
- Thorleif Vangen (1920–1996), Norwegian skier who competed in the 1948 Winter Olympics

== See also ==
- Norwegian Academy Prize in memory of Thorleif Dahl
