= Robert Coleman (sailor) =

British sailor (1883–1960)

Medal record

Sailing

Representing Great Britain

Olympic Games
Gold medal – first place	1920 Antwerp	7 metre

Robert Henry Schofield Coleman MC (9 June 1883 – 1 January 1960) was a British sailor who competed in the 1920 Summer Olympics.

== Olympics ==
Coleman was a crew member of the British boat Ancora, which won the gold medal in the 7 metre class.

== Military service ==
Coleman was commissioned as a second lieutenant in the 5th (Territorial Force) Battalion, Essex Regiment, on 15 December 1914. He married Constance Irene (Connie) Machin on 23 August 1915 in Reigate. He served in France from November 1915, and was seconded to the 63rd Battalion, Machine Gun Corps, on 23 April 1916. On 19 August 1917, he was promoted to lieutenant, with seniority from 1 June 1916.

He was awarded the Military Cross on 2 April 1919, which was gazetted in December. His citation read:

Lieutenant Robert Henry Schofield Coleman, 5th Bn., Essex Regiment, Territorial Force, seconded 63rd Bn., Machine Gun Corps.

"For conspicuous gallantry and initiative east of the Canal de l'Escaut. On 30th September 1918, he went forward in advance of the infantry to locate hostile machine guns which were holding up the infantry advance, returning later, and by skilful handling of his section succeeded in bringing them into action, and finally to neutralise the fire of enemy machine guns, which allowed the infantry to again move forward. His judgment and untiring energy throughout the operations 27th/30th September were most marked."

== See also ==
- Cyril Wright
- Dorothy Wright
- William Maddison
