= Hans Næss =

Hans Næss may refer to:

- Hans Næss (sailor) (1886–1958), Norwegian Olympic sailor
- Hans Næss (architect) (1723–1795), Danish architect
