= Sailing at the 1920 Summer Olympics – 18' Dinghy =

18' Dinghy at the Games of the VII Olympiad
- Line drawing of the 18' Dinghy
- Venue: Belgium, Ostend
- Dates: First race: 7 July 1920; Last race: 7 July 1920
- Competitors: 2 from 1 nation

The 18' Dinghy was a sailing event on the Sailing at the 1920 Summer Olympics program in Ostend. Four races were scheduled. Two sailors, on one boat, from one nation entered.

== Race schedule ==
●	Opening ceremony	●	Event competitions	●	Event finals	●	Closing ceremony

Date	July			
Date	7th Wed	8th Thu	9th Fri	10th Sat
18' Dinghy	●	●	●	●
Total gold medals				1

== Course area ==
18' Dinghy 1920 Olympic Course Area

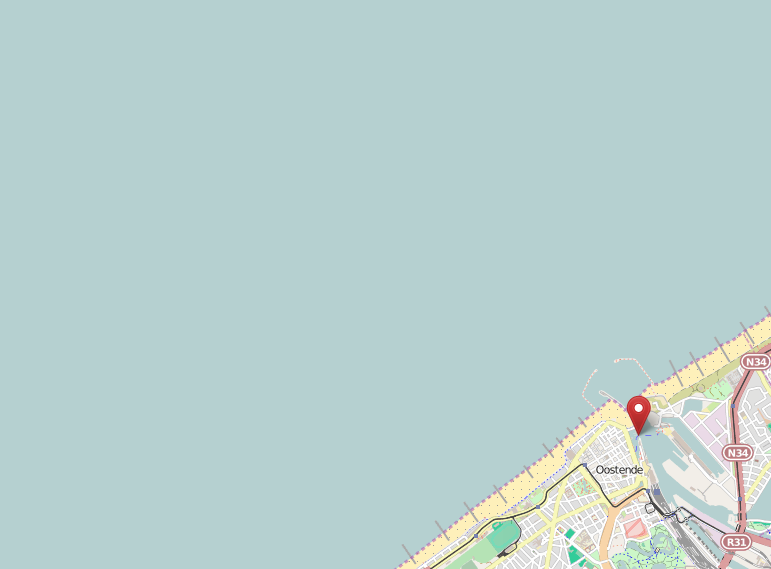
Ostend, Belgium

== Weather conditions ==
Date	Max temperature	Wind speed	Average wind direction
7 July 1920	Unknown		

== Final results ==
The 1920 Olympic scoring system was used. All competitors were male.

Rank	Country	Helmsman	Crew	Boat	Race 1		Race 2		Race 3		Race 4		Total
Rank	Country	Helmsman	Crew	Boat	Pos.	Pts.	Pos.	Pts.	Pos.	Pts.	Pos.	Pts.	Total
	Great Britain	Francis Richards	Trevor Hedberg	Brat	DNF	/	DNC	/	DNC	/	DNC	/	

Legend: DNC – Did not come to the starting area; DNF – Did not finish;

== Notes ==
- This was probably the least interesting event in the history of Olympic sailing: only one competitor turned up, and in the first of the planned races they failed to finish, not appearing for the remaining three.
- Similarly Stan Rowley (in the 1900 5000 m team race) won an Olympic gold medal despite not finishing their event.

== Other information ==
=== 18' Dinghy picture ===
The only sailing picture of the Olympic 18' Dinghy
