= Hellebuyck =

Hellebuyck is a Dutch or Flemish surname. Notable people with the surname include:

- Connor Hellebuyck (born 1993), American ice hockey player
- David Hellebuyck (born 1979), French footballer
- Eddy Hellebuyck (born 1961), American marathon runner
- Georges Hellebuyck (1890–1975), Belgian sailor
