= 8.5 Metre =

Hull
- LOA: 8.5 m (28 ft)

The International Eight point Five Metre Class is a construction class, meaning that the boats are not identical but are all designed to meet specific measurement formula, in this case the French rule called Jauge chemin de fer.

== History ==
The 8.5m was used as an Olympic Class during the 1920 Olympics, however no entries were actually made.

The first formula of the 8.5m as worked out by Louis Dyèvre in 1903, member of the Société des régates de Vannes, naval architect and member of the French delegation to the congress of London of 1906, was inspired by the formula of the New York Yacht Club.

$J=\frac {Lf \cdot \sqrt{S}} {\sqrt[3]{D}} \le 3,2$

== Olympic results ==
=== 1920 ===
No competitors entered the Olympics in the 8.5 Metre.
