= Einar Torgersen =

Norwegian sailor

Olympic medal record

Men's Sailing
Silver medal – second place	1920 Antwerp	6 metre class (1907 rating)

Einar Torgersen (24 August 1886 – 9 September 1946) was a Norwegian sailor who competed in the 1920 Summer Olympics. He was a crew member of the Norwegian boat Marmi, which won the silver medal in the 6 metre class (1907 rating).
