= Leif Erichsen =

Norwegian sailor

Personal information
- Born: 15 October 1888
- Died: 4 March 1924 (aged 35)

Sailing career
- Sport: Sailing
Medal record
Men's Sailing
Silver medal – second place	1920 Antwerp	6 metre class (1907 rating)

Leif Erichsen (15 October 1888 – 4 March 1924) was a Norwegian sailor.

Erichsen competed in the 1920 Summer Olympics. He was a crew member of the Norwegian boat Marmi, which won the silver medal in the 6 metre class (1907 rating). He died of pneumonia in Drammen, 35 years old.
