= Trygve Pedersen =

Norwegian sailor

Olympic medal record

Men's Sailing
Bronze medal – third place	1920 Antwerp	6 metre class (1907 rating)

Trygve Bjarne Pedersen (26 July 1884 – 14 August 1967) was a Norwegian sailor who competed in the 1920 Summer Olympics. He was a crew member of the Norwegian boat Stella, which won the bronze medal in the 6 metre class (1907 rating).
