= Léopold Standaert =

Belgian sailor

Personal information
- Full name: Léopold Standaert
- Nationality: Belgian
- Born: 25 August 1884 Ghent, Belgium
- Died: 4 February 1931 (aged 46) Antwerp, Belgium

Sailing career
- Sport: Sailing
- Class: 8 Metre
Medal record
Representing Belgium
Olympic Games
Bronze medal – third place	1920 Ostend	8 Metre
- Updated on 2014-02-03

Léopold Standaert (25 August 1884-4 February 1931) was a sailor from Belgium, who represented his native country at the 1920 Summer Olympics in Ostend, Belgium in the 8 Metre.
