= Henrik Agersborg =

Norwegian sailor and Olympian

Olympic medal record

Men's Sailing
Bronze medal – third place	1920 Antwerp	6 metre class (1907 rating)

Henrik Agersborg (5 July 1872 – 23 May 1942) was a Norwegian sailor who competed in the 1920 Summer Olympics. He was a crew member of the Norwegian boat Stella, which won the bronze medal in the 6 metre class (1907 rating).
