= Henning Müller =

Swedish tennis player (1896–1980)

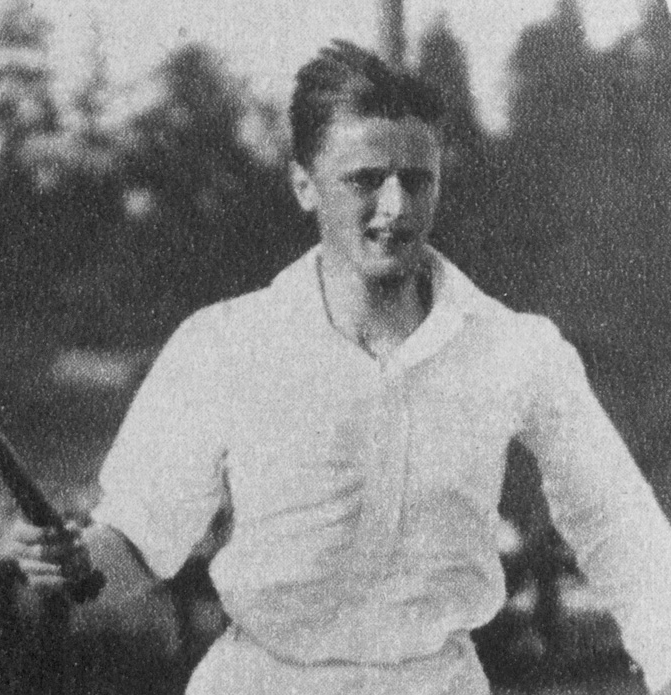
- Country (sports): Sweden
- Born: 4 November 1896 Stockholm, Sweden
- Died: 6 May 1980 (aged 83) Båstad, Sweden
- Plays: Right-handed

Singles

Grand Slam singles results
- Wimbledon: 1R (1927)

Other tournaments
- Olympic Games: 2R (1924)

Doubles

Grand Slam doubles results
- Wimbledon: 1R (1924)
- Olympic Games: QF (1924)

Mixed doubles
- Olympic Games: QF (1924)

Henning Christian Gottfrid Müller (4 November 1896 – 6 May 1980) was a Swedish tennis player who competed in singles and doubles at the 1920 and 1924 Olympics. He had his best results in the doubles, finishing ninth in 1920, with Olle Andersson, and fifth in 1924, with Charles Wennergren and Sigrid Fick.

At the 1927 Wimbledon Championships he lost in the first round of the singles event to Craig Campbell.
