= Henri Weewauters =

Belgian sailor

Medal record

Sailing

Representing Belgium

Olympic Games
Silver medal – second place	1908 London	6 metre
Bronze medal – third place	1920 Antwerp	8 metre

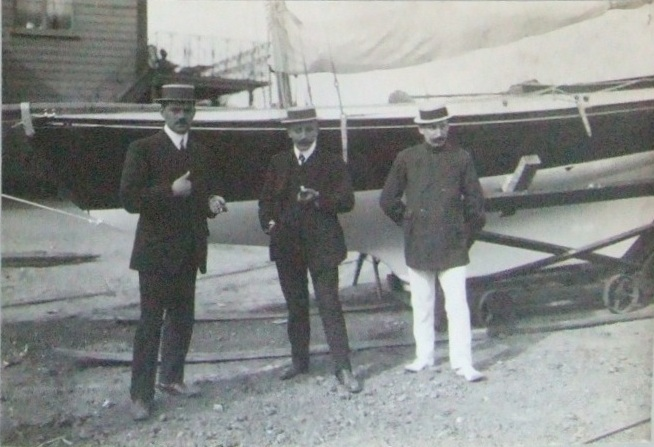
Léon Huybrechts Louis Huybrechts Henri Weewauters.jpg

Henricus Léon Alphonsus "Henri" Weewauters (8 November 1875 – 7 June 1962) was a Belgian sailor who competed in the 1908 Summer Olympics and in the 1920 Summer Olympics. In 1908, he won the silver medal in the 6 metre class with the Belgian boat Zut. Twelve years later, he was a crew member of the Belgian boat Antwerpia V, which won the bronze medal in the 8 metre class.

Weewauters was born in Wilrijk near Antwerp on 8 November 1975. He died on 7 June 1962 in Edegem in Antwerp on 7 June 1962 at the age of 86.
