= Albert Grisar (sailor) =

Belgian sailor (1870–1930)

Personal information
- Full name: Albert Jean Martin Grisar
- Nationality: Belgian
- Born: 26 September 1870 Antwerp, Belgium
- Died: 15 October 1930 (aged 60) Antwerp, Belgium

Sport

Sailing career
- Class: 8 Metre
Medal record
Representing Belgium
Olympic Games
Bronze medal – third place	1920 Ostend	8 Metre
- Updated on 2014-02-03

Albert Jean Martin Grisar (26 September 1870, in Antwerp – 15 October 1930, in Antwerp) was a sailor from Belgium, who represented his native country at the 1920 Summer Olympics in Ostend, Belgium in the 8 Metre.
