= Willy de l'Arbre =

Belgian sailor

Olympic medal record

Men's Sailing
Bronze medal – third place	1920 Antwerp	8-metre class (1919 rating)

Willy de l'Arbre (31 May 1882 – 11 March 1952) was a Belgian sailor who competed in the 1920 Summer Olympics. He was a crew member of the Belgian boat Antwerpia V, which won the bronze medal in the 8-metre class (1919 rating).
