= Sigurd Holter =

Norwegian sailor

Personal information
- Nationality: Norwegian
- Born: 19 November 1886 Halden
- Died: 1 August 1963 (aged 76)

Sport
- Sport: Sailing
Medal record
Men's sailing
Representing Norway
Gold medal – first place	1920 Antwerp	10 metre class (1907 rating)

Sigurd Holter (19 November 1886 – 1 August 1963) was a Norwegian sailor and Olympic champion.

He was a crew member of the Norwegian boat Eleda (cox Erik Herseth), which won the gold medal in the 10 metre class (1907 rating) at the 1920 Summer Olympics in Antwerp.
