= Einar Berntsen =

Norwegian sailor (1891–1965)

Olympic medal record

Men's Sailing
Bronze medal – third place	1920 Antwerp	6 metre class (1907 rating)

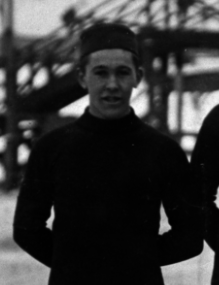
Einar Berntsen in February 1912 as a speed skater in Stockholm, Sweden.

Einar Berntsen (20 November 1891 – 1 February 1965) was a Norwegian sailor who competed in the 1920 Summer Olympics. He was a crew member of the Norwegian boat Stella, which won the bronze medal in the 6 metre class (1907 rating).
