= Johan Faye =

Norwegian sailor

Medal record

Sailing

Representing Norway

Olympic Games
Silver medal – second place	1920 Antwerp	7 metre class

Johan Mohr Faye (16 May 1889 – 16 September 1974) was a Norwegian architect and sailor who competed in the 1920 Summer Olympics. He was a crew member of the Norwegian boat Fornebo, which won the silver medal in the 7 metre class.

His uncle, Johan Faye, designed the Kristofer Lehmkuhls hus in 1881, which houses the Institutt for administrasjon og organisasjonsvitenskap (Department of Administration and Organization Theory) at the University of Bergen.

== See also ==
- Egill Reimers
