= Olle Andersson (tennis) =

Swedish tennis player

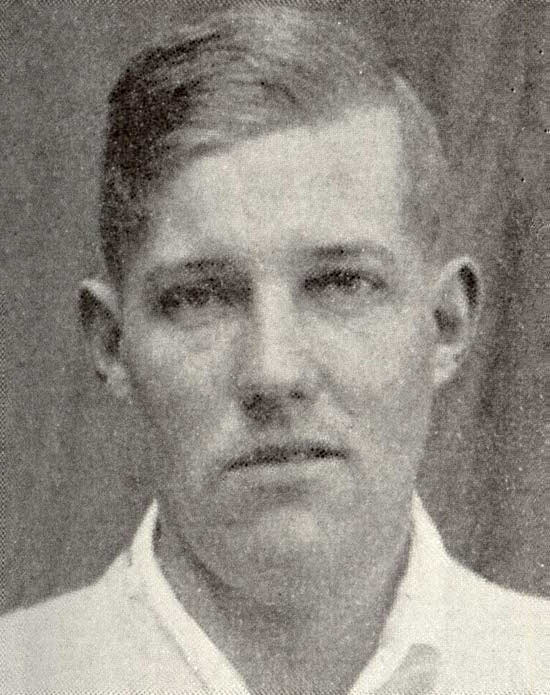
- Born: 29 December 1895 Gävle, Sweden
- Died: 6 May 1974 (aged 79) Gävle, Sweden

Anders Olof Antonius "Olle" Andersson (29 December 1895 – 6 May 1974) was a Swedish tennis player. He competed in the men's doubles at the 1920 Summer Olympics, together with Henning Müller, and finished in ninth place.
