= Tellef Wagle =

Norwegian sailor

Olympic medal record

Men's sailing

Representing Norway
Gold medal – first place	1920 Antwerp	8 metre class (1907 rating)

Tellef "Tell" Wagle (16 July 1883 – 2 December 1957) was a Norwegian sailor who competed in the 1920 Summer Olympics. He was a crew member of the Norwegian boat Irene, which won the gold medal in the 8 metre class (1907 rating).
