= Ole Sørensen (sailor) =

Norwegian sailor

Medal record

Sailing

Representing Norway

Olympic Games
Gold medal – first place	1920 Antwerp	10 metre (1907 rating)

Ole Sørensen (22 September 1883 – 25 February 1958) was a Norwegian sailor who competed in the 1920 Summer Olympics. He was a crew member of the Norwegian boat Eleda, which won the gold medal in the 10 metre class (1907 rating).
