= Henrik Østervold =

Norwegian sailor

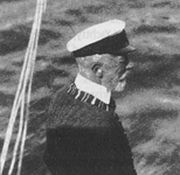

Personal information
- Full name: Henrik Olsen Østervold
- Nationality: Norwegian
- Born: 13 January 1878 Austevoll
- Died: 21 August 1957 (aged 79) Fana

Sport

Sailing career
- Class: 12-metre class
Medal record
sailing
Representing Norway
Olympic Games
Gold medal – first place	1920 Antwerp	12 Metre, International Rule 1907
- Updated on 2014-01-18

Henrik Østervold (13 January 1878 – 21 August 1957) was a Norwegian sailor who competed in the 1920 Summer Olympics. He was a helmsman on the Norwegian boat Atlanta, which won the gold medal in the 12-metre class (1907 rating).
