= Willy Gilbert =

Norwegian sailor (1881–1956)

Olympic medal record

Men's sailing

Representing Norway
Gold medal – first place	1920 Antwerp	10 metre class (1919 rating)

Willy C. M. Gilbert (10 September 1881 – 20 June 1956) was a Norwegian sailor who competed in the 1920 Summer Olympics. He was a crew member of the Norwegian boat Mosk II which won the gold medal in the 10 metre class (1919 rating).
