= Ralph Tschudi =

Norwegian sailor

Olympic medal record

Men's Sailing
Silver medal – second place	1920 Antwerp	8 metre class (1919 rating)

Ralph Tschudi (26 February 1890 – 11 October 1975) was a Norwegian sailor who competed in the 1920 Summer Olympics. He was a crew member of the Norwegian boat Lyn, which won the silver medal in the 8 metre class (1919 rating).
