= Halvor Birkeland =

Norwegian sailor (1894–1971)

Olympic medal record

Men's sailing

Representing Norway
Gold medal – first place	1920 Antwerp	12 metre class (1907 rating)

Halvor Olai Birkelund (30 October 1894 – 26 June 1971) was a Norwegian sailor who competed in the 1920 Summer Olympics. He was a crew member of the Norwegian boat Atlanta, which won the gold medal in the 12 metre class (1907 rating).
