= Gunnar Jamvold =

Norwegian sailor

Olympic medal record

Men's sailing

Representing Norway
Gold medal – first place	1920 Antwerp	10 metre class (1907 rating)

Gunnar Petter Jamvold (22 April 1896 – 9 September 1984) was a Norwegian sailor who competed in the 1920 Summer Olympics. He was a crew member of the Norwegian boat Eleda, which won the gold medal in the 10 metre class (1907 rating).
