= Jens Salvesen =

Norwegian sailor (1883–1976)

Olympic medal record

Men's Sailing
Silver medal – second place	1920 Antwerp	8 metre class (1919 rating)

Jens Johan Salvesen (8 September 1883 – 21 September 1976) was a Norwegian sailor who competed in the 1920 Summer Olympics. He was a crew member of the Norwegian boat Lyn, which won the silver medal in the 8 metre class (1919 rating).
