= Martin Borthen =

Norwegian sailor (1878–1964)

Olympic medal record

Men's sailing

Representing Norway
| Gold medal – first place | 1920 Antwerp | 12 metre class (1919 rating) |

Martin Luther Borthen (13 August 1878 – 25 March 1964) was a Norwegian sailor who competed in the 1920 Summer Olympics. He was a crew member of the Norwegian boat Heira II, which won the gold medal in the 12 metre class (1919 rating).
