= Rasmus Birkeland =

Norwegian sailor (1888–1972)

Olympic medal record

Men's sailing

Representing Norway
| Gold medal – first place | 1920 Antwerp | 12 metre class (1907 rating) |

Rasmus Ingvald Birkelund (14 April 1888 – 12 December 1972) was a Norwegian sailor who competed in the 1920 Summer Olympics. He was a crew member of the Norwegian boat Atlanta, which won the gold medal in the 12 metre class (1907 rating).
