= Otto Falkenberg =

Norwegian sailor

Olympic medal record

Men's sailing

Representing Norway
Gold medal – first place	1920 Antwerp	10 metre class (1919 rating)

Otto Gabriel Grubbe Dietrichson Falkenberg (9 January 1885 – 21 July 1977) was a Norwegian sailor who competed in the 1920 Summer Olympics. He was a crew member of the Norwegian boat Mosk II, which won the gold medal in the 10 metre class (1919 rating).
