= Alf Jacobsen =

Norwegian sailor

Olympic medal record

Men's sailing

Representing Norway
Gold medal – first place	1920 Antwerp	8 metre class (1907 rating)

Alf Kristian Bruun Jacobsen (14 June 1885 – 29 May 1948) was a Norwegian sailor who competed in the 1920 Summer Olympics. He was a crew member of the Norwegian boat Irene, which won the gold medal in the 8 metre class (1907 rating).
