= Kristoffer Olsen =

Norwegian sailor (1883–1948)

Olympic medal record

Men's sailing

Representing Norway
Gold medal – first place	1920 Antwerp	8 metre class (1907 rating)

Kristoffer Olsen (8 August 1883 – 4 August 1948) was a Norwegian sailor who competed in the 1920 Summer Olympics. He was a crew member of the Norwegian boat Irene, which won the gold medal in the 8 metre class (1907 rating).
