= Reidar Martiniuson =

Norwegian sailor (1893–1968)

Olympic medal record

Men's sailing

Representing Norway
Gold medal – first place	1920 Antwerp	8 metre class (1919 rating)

Johan Reidar Martiniuson (4 July 1893 – 4 June 1968) was a Norwegian sailor who competed in the 1920 Summer Olympics. He was a crew member of the Norwegian boat Sildra, which won the gold medal in the 8 metre class (1919 rating).
