= Arthur Allers =

Norwegian sailor (1875–1961)

Olympic medal record

Men's sailing

Representing Norway
Gold medal – first place	1920 Antwerp	12 metre class (1919 rating)

Arthur Allers (6 October 1875 – 28 June 1961) was a Norwegian sailor who competed in the 1920 Summer Olympics. He was a crew member of the Norwegian boat Heira II, which won the gold medal in the 12 metre class (1919 rating).
