= Georges Hellebuyck =

Belgian sailor (1890–1975)

Olympic medal record

Men's Sailing
Bronze medal – third place	1920 Antwerp	8 metre class (1919 rating)

Georges Auguste Hellebuyck (21 August 1890 – 20 February 1975) was a Belgian sailor who competed in the 1920 Summer Olympics. He was a crew member of the Belgian boat Antwerpia V, which won the bronze medal in the 8 metre class (1919 rating).
