= Lauritz Schmidt =

Norwegian sailor

Personal information
- Full name: Lauritz Thura Thrap Schmidt
- Born: 1 May 1897 Kristiania, Norway
- Died: 27 June 1970 (aged 73)
Medal record
Sailing
Representing Norway
Olympic Games
| Silver medal – second place | 1920 Antwerp | 8 metre class (1919 rating) |
| Silver medal – second place | 1936 Berlin | 8 metre class |

Lauritz Thura Thrap Schmidt (1 May 1897 – 27 June 1970) was a Norwegian yacht racer and businessperson.

He was born in Kristiania as a son of jurist Axel Schmidt (1863–1930) and Petra Jensen. He finished his secondary education in 1915, took commerce school and practical training in Hamburg. In 1927 he married wholesaler's daughter Ingeborg Molstad.

As a yacht racer he competed in the 1920 Summer Olympics and in the 1936 Summer Olympics. In 1920 he was a crew member of the Norwegian boat Lyn-2, which won the silver medal in the 8 metre class (1919 rating). Sixteen years later he won his second silver medal in the 8 metre class. He represented the Royal Norwegian Yacht Club.

He spent his professional career as manager of the book printer Nationaltrykkeriet and the bookbinder Forlagsbokbinderiet, from 1926. He chaired the Association for the Promotion of Skiing from 1939 to 1946, having been a board member since 1927.

Sporting positions
| Preceded by Nils Juell Dybwad | Chairman of the Association for the Promotion of Skiing; 1939–1946 | Succeeded by Nils Juell Dybwad |
