= Ingar Nielsen =

Norwegian sailor

Olympic medal record

Men's sailing

Representing Norway
Gold medal – first place	1920 Antwerp	10 metre class (1907 rating)
Gold medal – first place	1924 Paris	8 metre class

Ingar Nielsen (29 August 1885 – 21 January 1963) was a Norwegian sailor who competed in the 1920 Summer Olympics and in the 1924 Summer Olympics. In 1920, he was a crew member of the Norwegian boat Eleda, which won the gold medal in the 10 metre class (1907 rating). Four years later, he won his second gold medal in the 8 metre class.
