= Johan Friele =

Norwegian sailor

Olympic medal record

Men's sailing

Representing Norway
| Gold medal – first place | 1920 Antwerp | 12 metre class (1919 rating) |

Johan Mohr Friele (29 November 1866 – 1 October 1927) was a Norwegian sailor who competed in the 1920 Summer Olympics. He was a crew member of the Norwegian boat Heira II, which won the gold medal in the 12 metre class (1919 rating).
