= Olaf Ørvig =

Norwegian sailor (1889–1939)

Olympic medal record

Men's sailing

Representing Norway
| Gold medal – first place | 1920 Antwerp | 12 metre class (1919 rating) |

Olaf Ørvig (born 26 November 1889 in Kragerø – died 25 June 1939 in Bergen) was a Norwegian sailor who competed in the 1920 Summer Olympics. He was a crew member of the Norwegian boat Heira II, which won the gold medal in the 12 metre class (1919 rating).
