= Magnus Konow =

Norwegian sailor

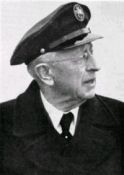

Personal information
- Full name: Magnus Andreas Thulstrup Clasen Konow
- Born: 1 September 1887 Melsomvik, Norway
- Died: 25 August 1972 (aged 84) San Remo, Italy

Sailing career
- Sport: Sailing
- Club: Royal Norwegian Yacht Club
- Classes: 6mR, 8mR, 12mR
Medal record
Sailing
Representing Norway
Olympic Games
| Gold medal – first place | 1912 Stockholm | 12 Metre |
| Gold medal – first place | 1920 Antwerp | 8 Metre |
| Silver medal – second place | 1936 Kiel | 6 Metre |

Magnus Andreas Thulstrup Clasen Konow (1 September 1887 – 25 August 1972) was a Norwegian sailor who competed in the 1908 Summer Olympics, in the 1912 Summer Olympics, in the 1920 Summer Olympics, in the 1928 Summer Olympics, in the 1936 Summer Olympics, and in the 1948 Summer Olympics.

In 1908, he was a crew member of the Norwegian boat Fram which finished fourth in the 8 metre class competition. Four years later, he won the gold medal as a crew member of the Norwegian boat Magda IX in the 12 metre class.

In 1920, he won his second gold medal as part of the Norwegian boat Sildra. In his fourth Olympic Games, he was a crew member of the Norwegian Noreg, which finished fourth in the 8 metre class competition. He won his third medal at the 1936 Olympics as helmsman of the Norwegian Lully II. They won silver in the 6 metre class event. His son Karsten Konow was one of the crew members.

His sixth and last Olympic appearance was in 1948 at the London Games. He was the helmsman of the Norwegian boat Apache which finished fourth in the 6 metre class competition.

He is one of only five athletes who have competed in the Olympics over a span of 40 years, along with fencer Ivan Joseph Martin Osiier, sailors Paul Elvstrøm and Durward Knowles and showjumper Ian Millar.

Family:

Magnus Andreas Thulstrup Clasen Konow, (1 September 1887 – 25 August 1972), was born in Stokke, Vestfold, Norway, he was the son of Einar Konow (1859–1946) and Dagny Clasen (1864–1900). He married three times; first (1) in 1913 with Else Nanna Grove from Denmark (1891-xx). Else Nanna Grove was the daughter of Peter Andreas Grove (København, 1856–1939) and Caroline Louise Frederikke Anette Ewald (f. 1869).

Children:

In his first marriage, Magnus Konow and Else Nanna Grove had three children together: Henny Else (1914–1999), later married to Ragnar Hargreaves, Vera Alexandra (1916–2009), later married to Lars Musæus, and Karsten Magnus (1918–1945). Later, he married (2) Iselin Danelius (9 February 1915 – 16 March 1939) from Bergen, Norway, in a short marriage. His last (3) marriage, lasting throughout, was with Olga Rapaport (1913–2002). They had one son together, Magnus Einar Konow (1948-).

== See also ==
- List of athletes with the most appearances at Olympic Games
