= Charles Arentz =

Norwegian sailor (1878–1968)

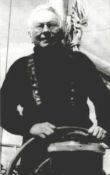

Medal record

Men's sailing

Representing Norway
Gold medal – first place	1920 Antwerp	10 metre class (1919 rating)

Charles Acher Arentz (8 November 1878 – 25 September 1968) was a Norwegian sailor who competed in the 1920 Summer Olympics. He was a crew member of the Norwegian boat Mosk II, which won the gold medal in the 10 metre class (1919 rating).
