= Erik Ørvig =

Norwegian sailor (1895–1949)

Olympic medal record

Men's sailing

Representing Norway
Gold medal – first place	1920 Antwerp	12 metre class (1919 rating)

Erik Ørvig (3 September 1895 – 8 October 1949 in Bergen) was a Norwegian sailor who competed in the 1920 Summer Olympics. He was a crew member of the Norwegian boat Heira II, which won the gold medal in the 12 metre class (1919 rating).
