= Arne Sejersted =

Norwegian sailor

Olympic medal record

Men's sailing

Representing Norway
| Gold medal – first place | 1920 Antwerp | 10 metre class (1919 rating) |

Arne Sejersted (18 July 1877 – 17 December 1960) was a Norwegian sailor who competed in the 1920 Summer Olympics. He was a crew member of the Norwegian boat Mosk II, which won the gold medal in the 10 metre class (1919 rating).
