= Claus Juell =

Norwegian sailor (1902–1979)

Olympic medal record

Men's sailing

Representing Norway
Gold medal – first place	1920 Antwerp	10 metre class (1907 rating)

Claus Ludvig Juell (5 February 1902 – 19 December 1979) was a Norwegian sailor who competed in the 1920 Summer Olympics. He was a crew member of the Norwegian boat Eleda, which won the gold medal in the 10 metre class (1907 rating).
