= Lauritz Christiansen =

Norwegian sailor

Olympic medal record

Men's sailing

Representing Norway
Gold medal – first place	1920 Antwerp	12 metre class (1907 rating)

Lauritz Christiansen (10 December 1867 – 9 December 1930) was a Norwegian sailor who competed in the 1920 Summer Olympics. He was a crew member of the Norwegian boat Atlanta, which won the gold medal in the 12 metre class (1907 rating).
