= Halfdan Schjøtt =

Norwegian sailor

Medal record

Sailing

Representing Norway

Olympic Games
Gold medal – first place	1920 Antwerp	10 metre class (1919 rating)

Halfdan Schjøtt (26 December 1893 – 14 February 1974) was a Norwegian sailor who competed in the 1920 Summer Olympics. He was a crew member of the Norwegian boat Mosk II, which won the gold medal in the 10 metre class (1919 rating).
