= Egill Reimers =

Norwegian architect and sailor

Olympic medal record

Men's sailing

Representing Norway
Gold medal – first place	1920 Antwerp	12 metre class (1919 rating)

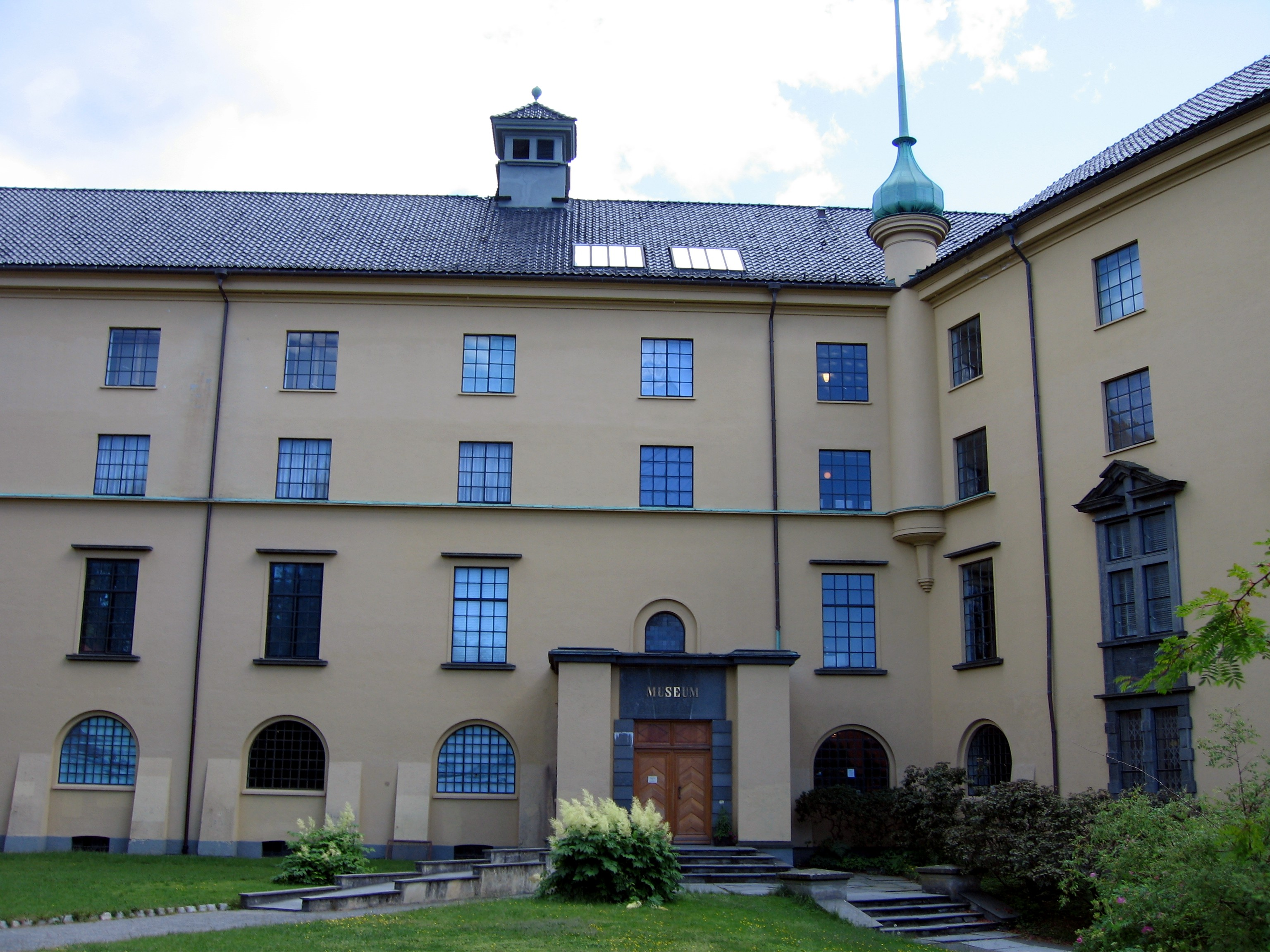
Cultural History Collections

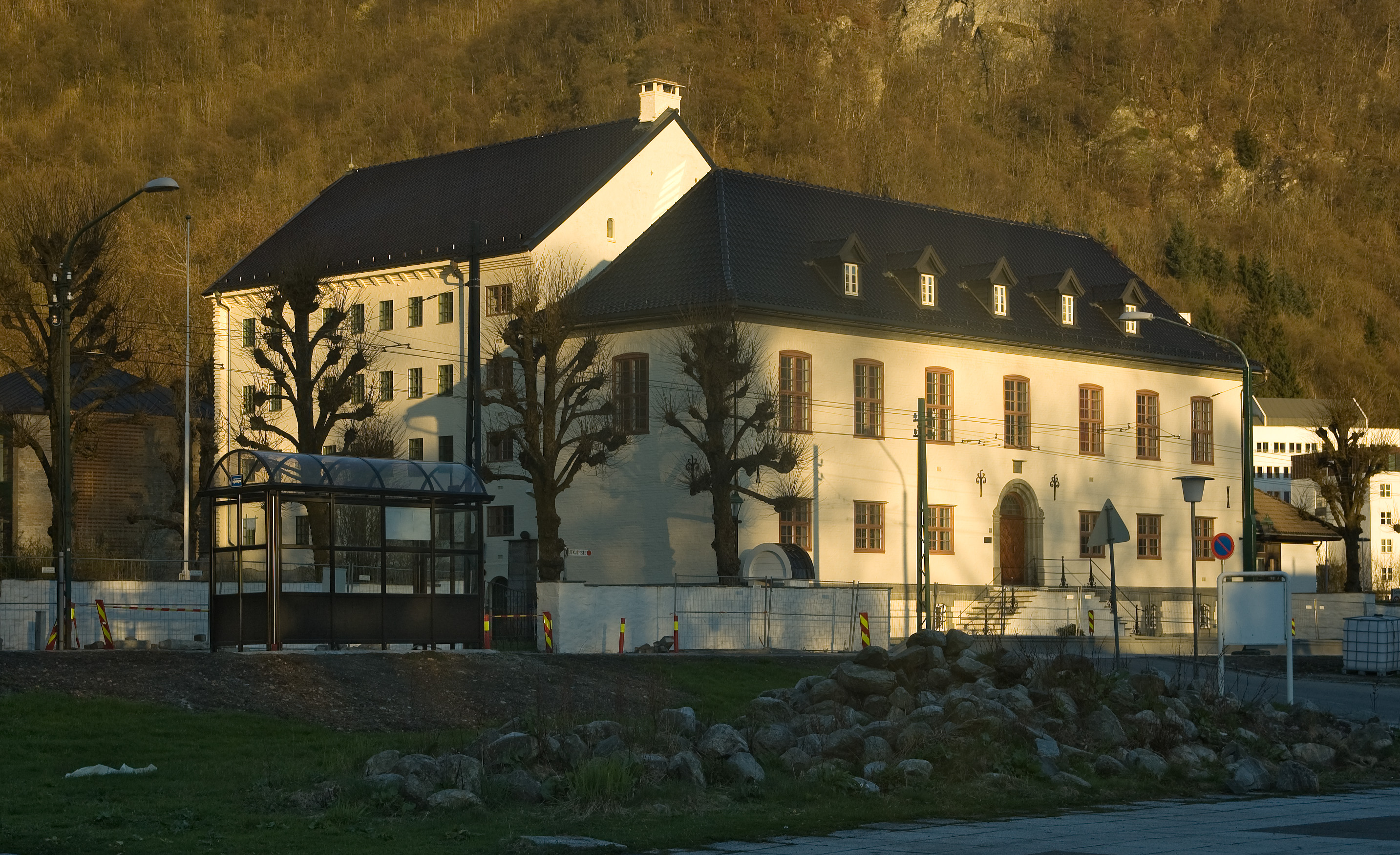
State Archives in Bergen

Egill Reimers (July 18, 1878 – November 11, 1946) was a Norwegian architect. He also competed in the 1920 Summer Olympics.

Reimers was born in Bergen, Norway, to Bastiam Reimers (b. 1838) and Maren Johnsdatter (b. 1843). (Birth and marriage records spell his name Egil.) He married Signe de Lange on March 24, 1906 in Bergen.

He graduated as an architect at Technische Hochschule at Munich in 1902. He started his own practice in Bergen during 1904.

Reimers was one of the most active architects in the Bergen during the first half of the 20th century. He was awarded the Houen Foundation Award in 1924 for his design of the State Archives in Bergen (Statsarkivet i Bergen). The Bergen District Court (Bergen Tinghuset) was designed in the style of Neoclassical architecture during 1933 and is considered one of his main works.

His building designs include several for the University of Bergen: University Museum of Bergen Cultural History Collection (De kulturhistoriske samlinger) in 1927, Geophysics Institute (Geofysisk Institutt) in 1928 and Nuclear Physics Laboratory (Kjernefysisk laboratorium) which was completed in 1950.

Reimers was a crew member of the Norwegian boat Heira II, which won the gold medal at the 1920 Summer Olympics in Antwerp, Belgium. He competed in the 12 metre class (1919 rating).
