= Sten Abel =

Norwegian sailor (1899–1989)

Personal information
- Full name: Egil Sten Abel
- Nationality: Norwegian
- Born: 18 November 1899 Oslo, Norway
- Died: 30 December 1989 (aged 90) Bærum, Norway

Sailing career
- Sport: Sailing
- Club: Royal Norwegian Yacht Club
Medal record
Sailing
Representing Norway
Olympic Games
Silver medal – second place	1920 Antwerp	7 metre class

Egil Sten Abel (18 November 1899 – 30 December 1989) was a Norwegian sailor who competed in the 1920 Summer Olympics. He was a crew member of the Norwegian boat Fornebo, which won the silver medal in the 7 metre class.

Abel was a reserve officer (Norwegian: vernepliktig officer) in the Norwegian Army. During the Norwegian campaign, he was placed in the command of a group of volunteers dubbed ‘Abel’s Ski Company’. The group was disbanded after Norway’s surrender, and Abel was taken in as a prisoner of war from 1940 to 1941.
