= William Maddison =

British sailor

Medal record

Sailing

Representing Great Britain

Olympic Games
Gold medal – first place	1920 Antwerp	7 metre

William John Maddison (1882 – 10 June 1924) was a British sailor and Olympic champion. He competed at the 1920 Summer Olympics in Antwerp and won a gold medal in the 7 metre class aboard the Ancora.
