= Erik Herseth =

Norwegian sailor

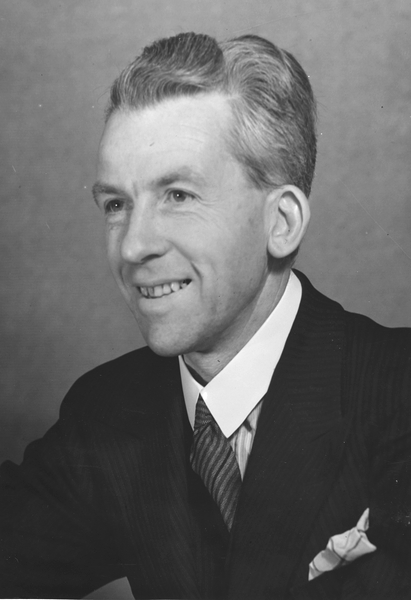
- Erik Herseth, c. 1945

Personal information
- Full name: Erik Johan Herseth
- Nationality: Norwegian
- Born: 9 July 1892 Oslo
- Died: 18 January 1993 (aged 100) Oslo

Sport

Sailing career
- Club: Royal Norwegian Yacht Club
Medal record
sailing
Representing Norway
Olympic Games
Gold medal – first place	1920 Antwerp	10 metre class (1907 rating)
- Updated on 2014-01-18

Erik Johan Herseth (9 July 1892 – 28 January 1993) was a Norwegian sailor who competed in the 1920 Summer Olympics. He was a crew member of the Norwegian boat Eleda, which won the gold medal in the 10 metre class (1907 rating).

== Professional life ==
Herseth was a real Homo Universalis. When he won his Olympic Gold in 1920 Herseth was a famous baritone. He made his debut in 1918 in the Opera Comique in Oslo. In 1921 he moved to Vienna. There as correspondent of the newspaper Abendpost he did interviews of personalities like Josephine Baker. From 1924 till 1928 he was part of the Wiener Volksoper. Herseth was besides baritone a voice teacher, art dealer and painted under the Pseudonym of L. Smith. Besides all this Herseth was a First lieutenant by the Norwegian Airforce. In this role he was in active duty during World War II by the Norwegian troops in Sweden.

== Personal life ==
His daughter Astri Herseth became a famous soprano at the Norwegian State Opera in Oslo.
