= Hans Næss (sailor) =

Norwegian sailor

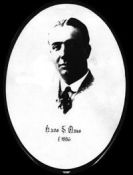

Personal information
- Full name: Hans Henrik Stoermann-Næss
- Nationality: Norwegian
- Born: 3 November 1886 Bergen
- Died: 10 December 1958 (aged 72) Bergen

Sport

Sailing career
- Class: 12-metre class
- Club: Bergens Seilforening
Medal record
sailing
Representing Norway
Olympic Games
Gold medal – first place	1920 Antwerp	12 Metre, International Rule 1907
- Updated on 2014-01-18

Hans Henrik Stoermann-Næss (3 November 1886 – 10 December 1958) was a Norwegian sailor who competed in the 1920 Summer Olympics. He was born and died in Bergen. Næss was a crew member of the Norwegian boat Atlanta, which won the gold medal in the 12 metre class (1907 rating).
