= Cyril Wright (sailor) =

British yacht racer

Medal record

Sailing

Representing Great Britain

Olympic Games
| Gold medal – first place | 1920 Antwerp | 7 metre |

Cyril Macey Wright (17 September 1885 – 26 July 1960) was an English sailor who competed in the 1920 Summer Olympics representing Great Britain.

He was a crew member of the British boat Ancora, which won the gold medal in the 7-metre class. He was the husband of fellow crew member Dorothy Wright.

By being a married couple to win an Olympic gold medal together for Great Britain, Wright and his wife achieved a feat not repeated until Kate and Helen Richardson-Walsh were part of the British team which won gold in women's hockey at the 2016 summer Olympics.
