= Christian Dick =

Norwegian sailor

Medal record

Sailing

Representing Norway

Olympic Games
Silver medal – second place	1920 Antwerp	7 metre class

Christian Dick (2 September 1883 – 14 August 1955) was a Norwegian sailor who competed in the 1920 Summer Olympics. He was a crew member of the Norwegian boat Fornebo, which won the silver medal in the 7 metre class.
