= Thorleif Kristoffersen =

Norwegian sailor

Olympic medal record

Men's sailing

Representing Norway
Gold medal – first place	1920 Antwerp	8 metre class (1919 rating)

Thorleif Asbjørn Kristoffersen (19 August 1900 – 25 August 1971) was a Norwegian sailor who competed in the 1920 Summer Olympics. He was a crew member of the Norwegian boat Sildra, which won the gold medal in the 8 metre class (1919 rating).
