= Dorothy Wright =

British yacht racer

Medal record

Sailing

Representing Great Britain

Olympic Games
Gold medal – first place	1920 Antwerp	7 metre

Dorothy Winifred Wright (19 August 1889 – 1960) was an English sailor who competed in the 1920 Summer Olympics representing Great Britain.

She was a crew member of the British boat Ancora, which won the gold medal in the 7 metre class. She was the wife of fellow crew member Cyril Wright.

By being a married couple to win an Olympic gold medal together for Great Britain, Wright and her husband achieved a feat not repeated until Kate and Helen Richardson-Walsh were part of the British team which won gold in women's hockey at the 2016 summer Olympics.
