= Niels Nielsen (sailor) =

Norwegian sailor

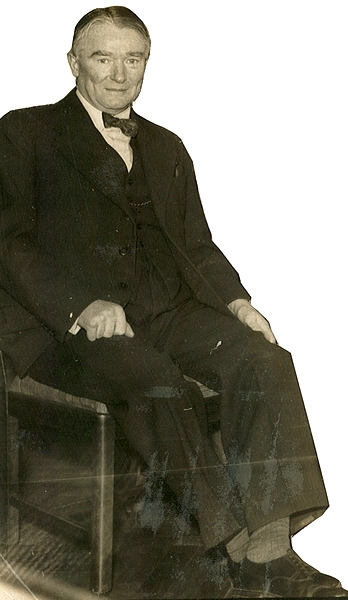

Medal record

Sailing

Representing Norway

Olympic Games
Silver medal – second place	1920 Antwerp	7 metre class

Niels Marius Nielsen (5 October 1883 – 9 February 1961) was a Norwegian sailor who competed in the 1920 Summer Olympics. He was a crew member of the Norwegian boat Fornebo, which won the silver medal in the 7 metre class.
