= Thorleif Holbye =

Norwegian sailor

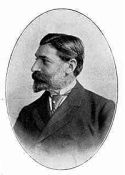

Medal record

Men's sailing

Representing Norway
| Gold medal – first place | 1920 Antwerp | 8 metre class (1907 rating) |

Thorleif Holbye (29 April 1883 – 19 October 1959) was a Norwegian sailor who competed in the 1920 Summer Olympics. He was a crew member of the Norwegian boat Irene, which won the gold medal in the 8 metre class (1907 rating).
