= Scoring systems for Sailing at the Summer Olympics =

Over time, several scoring systems for Sailing were used during the Summer Olympics. Many of these systems were also used by other regattas in their times. In order to understand how the medals in the Olympics were handed out one must have a look at the scoring system of that specific olympic sailing regatta.

From the start of sailing till the turn of the millennium one practiced the principle that the difference in points between No. 1 and 2 must be larger than between No. 2 and 3 and so on. Several systems in different variations were invented. For the last couple of Olympics this principle was no longer followed.

== 1900 Olympic scoring system ==
In 1900 for the different races different systems were used:

=== Olympic races at Meulan ===
In the following classes only one race was sailed for each gold medal.

- 0 – ½ Ton
- ½ – 1 Ton
- 1 – 2 Ton
- 2 – 3 Ton
- 3 – 10 Ton

In these races each boat was given, in advance, a handicap of several minutes and seconds. For each boat, the sailing time over the course was measured. This sailed time plus the handicap gave the corrected time. The boat with the lowest corrected time became winner.

=== Olympic races at Le Havre ===
Since in the 10 – 20 Ton a series of three races was sailed, a scoring system beside the handicap system was used. Per race one could earn points as follows:

- 1st place: 10 points
- 2nd place: 9 points
- 3rd place: 8 points
- ...
- 6th (last) place: 5 points

A disqualification of penalty gives the points of the last place minus 1. Therefore, In the Olympics with six boats competing this gives 4 points.
All races counted and the scoring system was used after the corrected time was calculated.

=== Open class at Meulan ===
For the Open class NO handicap or scoring system was used. The order in which the boats crossed the finishing line was the result of the regatta. This with the exception of the boats that were disqualified.

=== In case of a tie ===
There are no known provisions for breaking a tie in the 1900 sailing regattas at the Olympic Games.

== 1908 Olympic scoring system ==
Three races would be scheduled in each class. The winner is the yacht with the most 1st places

=== In case of a tie ===
In the event of three different yachts winning these Races, points will be allotted to them according to the following scale:

- 1st place: 3 points
- 2nd place: 2 points
- 3rd place: 1 point
- 4 ... no points.

The tie is broken in favor of the yacht with the most points. Should two or more winners in any class tie under these conditions, they shall sail an extra match, on a day to be appointed, and the winner of this match shall be adjudged the absolute winner of the series.
Any tie for second place will be decided in the same manner.

== 1912 Olympic scoring system ==
In each class there will be 2 ordinary races, with the following method of scoring:

- 1st place: 7 points
- 2nd place: 3 points
- 3rd place: 1 point
- 4 ... no points.

=== In case of a tie ===
Should two or more yachts in any class tie under these conditions for one of the first 3 places overall, the yachts involved shall sail an extra race. The winner breaks the tie in its favor.

== 1920 Olympic scoring system ==
For the Games in Belgium a so-called Point for Place system was used:

- 1st place: 1 point
- 2nd place: 2 points
- ...
- DNF: points equal to the No. of started boats
- DNS: points equal to the No. of entered boats

=== In case of a tie ===
Should two or more yachts in any class tie under these conditions a sail-off would determine the final result.

== 1924 Olympic scoring system ==
For the 1924 Games in France system of elimination series and semi finals was used.

=== French National Monotype 1924 ===
In this class a total of 17 competitors participated. The France Olympic Committee had made available a total of 8 mostly identical boats. So here the fleet was divided in two flights of eight. In each elimination series one country was exempt and was automatically qualified for the semi-final. Per flight the best two boats earned a place in the semi-final. Finally a sail off was held for the places 2–4.

=== 6 & 8 Metre ===
In this class three elimination series were scheduled. The two best of each flight got a place in the semi-final. Eventually ties were broken by the result of the final race. The result of the other boats, up to place 6, was determined by the total result of the elimination series by the point for place system.

=== In case of a tie ===
- Ties in the elimination series were not broken.
- Ties in the semi-finals were broken by the result of the elimination series.

== 1928 Olympic scoring system ==
=== 12 Foot Dinghy ===
- Each contestant participates in four events and receives a number of points corresponding to his order of arrival in his group.
- Should a contestant retire or be disqualified he shall be allowed a number of points identical with the number of starters in his group.
- Should a contestant not start he shall be allowed a number of points identical with the number of entrants in his group.
- The ten contestants obtaining the lowest number of points in the preliminary contests participate in the finals.
- The ten contestants in the finals, sail in four events in accordance with the principles laid down for the Int. 8 and 6 metres classes.

=== 6 and 8 Metre ===
- Seven events are held;
- After 4 events all contestants drop out which have not been placed first, second or third at least once.
- The crew of the vessel finishing first in most events is the winner.
- Should the crew of a vessel retire or be disqualified their place in the order of merit shall be the same as the number starters.
- In the event of a crew not starting their place in the order of merit shall be the same as the number of valid entries in the respective class.

=== In case of a tie ===
- Should there be a tie as regards the first places, the number of second places obtained by those concerned shall decide which vessel is winner.
- In the event of this being a tie, the number of third places shall be the deciding factor.
- An identical system shall be applied with regard to the vessels qualifying for the second and third places, etc.

== 1932 Olympic scoring system ==
The winner in each class of the Yachting competition was decided on the following point system:

- A yacht was given one point for finishing.
- A yacht was given one point for each boat it defeated.
- The number of defeated yachts was figured on the number starting in any one race.
- A yacht that started and did not finish did not receive a point for starting, but was counted as a defeated yacht in awarding points to the other yachts.
- Where only one yacht was entered, it was necessary for her to sail over and properly complete the course in order to be awarded a place.

=== In case of a tie ===
In case of a tie after all races were sailed, provision was made for an extra race between the competitors tied.

== 1936 Olympic scoring system ==
Equal as 1932.

=== In case of a tie ===
In case of a tie after all races were sailed, provision was made for an extra race between the competitors tied. This rule only applies as it concerns the places 1, 2 or 3.

== 1940 Olympic scoring system ==
For the 1940 Olympics the following scoring system was intended:

- 1st: points equal to the number of started boats + 10
- 2nd: points equal to the number of started boats – 1 (+5 if four or more boats did start)
- 3rd: points equal to the number of started boats – 2 (+3 if six or more boats did start)
- 4th: points equal to the number of started boats – 3
- 5th: points equal to the number of started boats – 4
- ...
- DNF: 3 points
- DNS: 0 points
- DSQ: 0 points

=== In case of a tie ===
In case of a tie the helmsman with the most first places wins the serie. If this does not break the tie the helmsman with the most second places wins the serie and so on. If the tie is still not broken the series goes to the helmsmen with the best result in the last race.

== 1948 Olympic scoring system ==
Until the 1932 Olympics many scoring systems were used. Most of them put a lot of weight at winning of races. This changes in Los Angeles where a point for place system was used. Still the need for awarding the winning of races remained.

In Austria a point system was developed were the delta between two sequential places was decreased with the rank. In other words: a lot of points between 1 and 2 and less difference between 24 and 25. The system was based upon a formula taking the number of entries and the rank of into account. Not finishing, retiring after the finish, disqualification or not starting gave 0 points. The formula looked like this:

$$Points = 101 + 1000 log A - 1000 log N$$

N = Rank and A = Number of entries. This formula is in the table below exercised for 1 to 25 entries.

This system was used for the 1948 Olympics. Seven races were scheduled, of the seven races, a yacht counted only the points for her best six races.

	No. of entries (A)																								
Rank (N)	1	2	3	4	5	6	7	8	9	10	11 6 Metre	12 Dragon	13	14 Swallow	15	16	17 Star	18	19	20	21 Firefly	22	23	24	25
1	101	402	578	703	800	879	946	1004	1055	1101	1142	1180	1215	1247	1277	1305	1331	1356	1380	1402	1423	1443	1463	1481	1499
2		101	277	402	499	578	645	703	754	800	841	879	914	946	976	1004	1030	1055	1079	1101	1122	1142	1162	1180	1198
3			101	226	323	402	469	527	578	624	665	703	738	770	800	828	854	879	903	925	946	966	986	1004	1022
4				101	198	277	344	402	453	499	540	578	613	645	675	703	729	754	778	800	821	841	861	879	897
5					101	180	247	305	356	402	443	481	516	548	578	606	632	657	681	703	724	744	764	782	800
6						101	168	226	277	323	364	402	437	469	499	527	553	578	602	624	645	665	685	703	721
7							101	159	210	256	297	335	370	402	432	460	486	511	535	557	578	598	618	636	654
8								101	152	198	239	277	312	344	374	402	428	453	477	499	520	540	560	578	596
9									101	147	188	226	261	293	323	351	377	402	426	448	469	489	508	527	545
10										101	142	180	215	247	277	305	331	356	380	402	423	443	463	481	499
11											101	139	174	206	236	264	290	315	338	361	382	402	421	440	458
12												101	136	168	198	226	252	277	301	323	344	364	384	402	420
13													101	133	163	191	218	242	266	288	309	329	349	367	385
14														101	131	159	185	210	234	256	277	297	317	335	353
15															101	129	155	180	204	226	247	267	287	305	323
16																101	127	152	176	198	219	239	259	277	295
17																	101	126	149	172	193	213	232	251	268
18																		101	124	147	168	188	207	226	244
19																			101	123	144	165	184	202	220
20																				101	122	142	162	180	198
21																					101	121	141	159	177
22																						101	120	139	157
23																							101	119	137
24																								101	119
25																									101
'DNF	0	0	0	0	0	0	0	0	0	0	0	0	0	0	0	0	0	0	0	0	0	0	0	0	0
'DNS	0	0	0	0	0	0	0	0	0	0	0	0	0	0	0	0	0	0	0	0	0	0	0	0	0
'DSQ	0	0	0	0	0	0	0	0	0	0	0	0	0	0	0	0	0	0	0	0	0	0	0	0	0

- DNF = Did Not Finish
- DNS = Did not start
- DSQ = Disqualified

=== In case of a tie ===
Ties were broken as follows:

- First count the number of times one boat placed ahead of the other
- The number of first places
- The number of second places and so on
- Tie breaker race

== 1952 Olympic scoring system ==
The Austrian scoring system of 1948 was used. Below you find the relevant tables:

	No. of entries (A)				
Rank (N)	11 6 Metre	12 5.5 Metre	14 Dragon	17 Star	28 Finn
1	1142	1305	1331	1423	1548
2	841	1004	1030	1122	1247
3	665	828	854	946	1071
4	540	703	729	821	946
5	443	606	632	724	849
6	364	527	553	645	770
7	297	460	486	578	703
8	239	402	428	520	645
9	188	351	377	469	594
10	142	305	331	423	548
11	101	264	290	382	507
12		226	252	344	469
13		191	218	309	434
14		159	185	277	402
15		129	155	247	372
16		101	127	219	344
17			101	193	318
18				168	293
19				144	269
20				122	247
21				101	226
22					206
23					186
24					168
25					150
26					133
27					117
28					101
DNF	0	0	0	0	0
DNS	0	0	0	0	0
DSQ	0	0	0	0	0

- DNF = Did Not Finish
- DNS = Did not start
- DSQ = Disqualified

== 1956 Olympic scoring system ==
The Austrian scoring system of 1948 was used. Below you find the relevant tables:

	No. of entries (A)				
Rank (N)	10 5.5 Metre	12 Star	13 12m^{2} Sharpie	16 Dragon	20 Finn
1	1101	1180	1215	1305	1402
2	800	879	914	1004	1101
3	624	703	738	828	925
4	499	578	613	703	800
5	402	481	516	606	703
6	323	402	437	527	624
7	256	335	370	460	557
8	198	277	312	402	499
9	147	226	261	351	448
10	101	180	215	305	402
11		139	174	264	361
12		101	136	226	323
13			101	191	288
14				159	256
15				129	226
16				101	198
17					172
18					147
19					123
20					101
DNF	0	0	0	0	0
DNS	0	0	0	0	0
DSQ	0	0	0	0	0

- DNF = Did Not Finish
- DNS = Did not start
- DSQ = Disqualified

== 1960 Olympic scoring system ==
The Austrian scoring system of 1948 was used. With the exception that a yacht that did not finish now gets 101 points. Below you find the relevant tables:

	No. of entries (A)				
Rank (N)	19 5.5 Metre	26 Star	27 Dragon	31 Flying Dutchman	35 Finn
1	1380	1516	1532	1592	1645
2	1079	1215	1231	1291	1344
3	903	1039	1055	1115	1168
4	778	914	930	990	1043
5	681	817	833	893	946
6	602	738	754	814	867
7	535	671	687	747	800
8	477	613	629	689	742
9	426	562	578	638	691
10	380	516	532	592	645
11	338	475	491	551	604
12	301	437	453	513	566
13	266	402	418	478	531
14	234	370	386	446	499
15	204	340	356	416	469
16	176	312	328	388	441
17	149	286	302	362	415
18	124	261	277	337	390
19	101	237	254	314	366
20		215	231	291	344
21		194	210	270	323
22		174	190	250	303
23		154	171	231	283
24		136	152	212	265
25		118	134	194	247
26		101	117	177	230
27			101	161	214
28				145	198
29				130	183
30				115	168
31				101	154
32					140
33					127
34					114
35					101
DNF	101	101	101	101	101
DNS	0	0	0	0	0
DSQ	0	0	0	0	0

- DNF = Did Not Finish
- DNS = Did not start
- DSQ = Disqualified

== 1964 Olympic scoring system ==
The Austrian scoring system of 1964 was used. Below you find the relevant tables:

	No. of entries (A)				
Rank (N)	15 5.5 Metre	17 Star	21 Dragon	23 Flying Dutchman	33 Finn
1	1277	1331	1423	1463	1620
2	976	1030	1122	1162	1318
3	800	854	946	986	1142
4	675	729	821	861	1017
5	578	632	724	764	921
6	499	553	645	685	841
7	432	486	578	618	774
8	374	428	520	560	716
9	323	377	469	508	665
10	277	331	423	463	620
11	236	290	382	421	578
12	198	252	344	384	540
13	163	218	309	349	506
14	131	185	277	317	473
15	101	155	247	287	443
16		127	219	259	415
17		101	193	232	389
18			168	207	364
19			144	184	341
20			122	162	318
21			101	141	297
22				120	277
23				101	258
24					239
25					222
26					205
27					188
28					172
29					157
30					142
31					128
32					114
33					101
DNF	101	101	101	101	101
DNS	0	0	0	0	0
DSQ	0	0	0	0	0

- DNF = Did Not Finish
- DNS = Did not start
- DSQ = Disqualified

== 1968 Olympic scoring system ==
For each class a series should consist of seven scheduled races. For each yacht the best six races will count. If only six races are sailed the best five race will count. If only five races are sailed all five will count.

- 1st place: 0 points
- 2nd place: 3 points
- 3rd place: 5.7 points
- 4th place: 8 points
- 5th place: 10 points
- 6th place: 11.7 points
- All other places: Place + 6 points
- DNS: Place = No. of entered boats
- DNF: Place = No. of started boats
- DSQ: Place = No. of entered boats + 2
- RET: Place = No. of started boats

=== In case of a tie ===
In case of a tie the yacht with the most first places, over the 6 counting races for each yacht, wins the series. If this does not break the tie the helmsman with the most second places wins the series and so on. If the tie is still not broken then the tie remains.

== 1972 Olympic scoring system ==
The 1968 Olympic scoring system was used. With the exception that DSQ scored now: Place = No. of entered boats + 1

== 1984 Olympic scoring system ==
The 1968 Olympic scoring system was used. With the exception that DSQ scored now: Place = No. of entered boats + 1

Also: RET = Place = No. of entered boats + 1 YMP = Points by decision of the jury (most used = average score)
