= Sailing at the 1928 Summer Olympics =

Sailing at the Games of the IX Olympiad
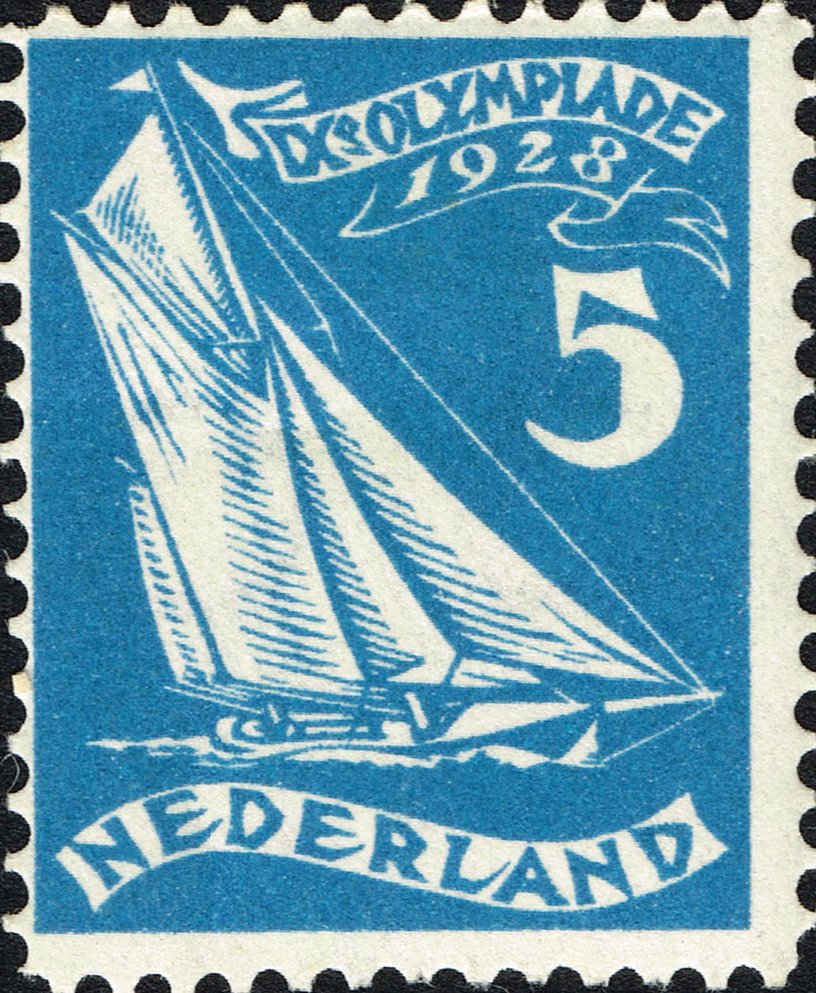
- Sailing at the 1928 Summer Olympics on a Dutch stamp
- Venues: Six Harbor ● Buiten Y ● Zuiderzee
- Dates: First race: 2 August 1928; Last race: 9 August 1928
- Competitors: 124 Male and 2 Female from 23 nations
- Boats: 41

Sailing/Yachting is an Olympic sport starting from the Games of the 1st Olympiad (1896 Olympics in Athens, Greece). With the exception of 1904 and the canceled 1916 Summer Olympics, sailing has always been included on the Olympic schedule. The Sailing program of 1928 consisted of a total of three sailing classes. For each class races were scheduled from 2–9 August 1928 on the Buiten Y near Amsterdam and on the Zuiderzee. The sailing was done on the triangular type Olympic courses.

== Venue ==
Six Harbor
- Sixhaven
- Emblem of the KVNWV

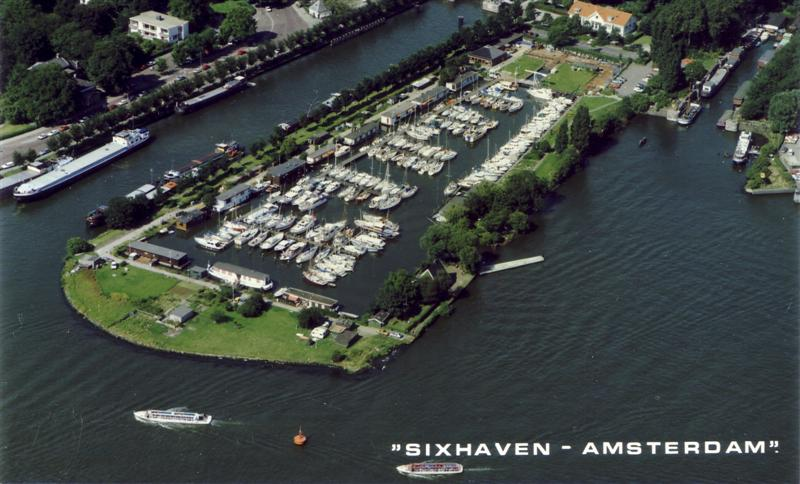
- Interactive map of the Six Harbor area

General information
- Status: Completed
- Type: Olympic harbor
- Location: Sixhavenweg 15, 1021 HG Amsterdam, Netherlands
- Coordinates: 52°22′54″N 4°54′23″E
- Elevation: Sealevel
- Completed: 1920
- Client: Koninklijke Nederlandsche Zeil- & Roeivereeniging
- Owner: Watersportvereniging Dok- en Scheepsbouw

=== Six Harbor ===
As venue for the Amsterdam Olympics the Zuiderzee near Amsterdam was chosen. The organizing committee of the sailing event was the Koninklijk Verbond Nederlandsche Watersport Vereniging. The Olympic harbor Six Harbor was on the North shore of the Y just opposite of the Amsterdam Centraal railway station. The boats were moored in the so-called 'kinderkamer' of the harbor. The Six Harbor was in that time the location of the Koninklijke Nederlandsche Zeil- & Roeivereeniging. This resulted that all competing yachts had to go through the Oranje Locks to enter the Buiten Y and Zuiderzee. Some of the former buildings of the Six Harbor were demolished during the construction of the Amsterdam Metro North–south line.

=== Course areas ===
A total of two race areas were used for sailing at the Amsterdam Olympics:

- The courses of the 12' Dinghy were just outside the locks on the buiten Y in front of Durgerdam.
- For the 6 and 8 Metre the used courses were about 5 nm out of the locks, East of the Isle of Marken on the Zuiderzee.

At that time the Zuiderzee had an open connection with the North Sea. The sea water was salt or at best brackish. Waves could be steep and short due to the shallow waters.

1928 Olympic Course Areas

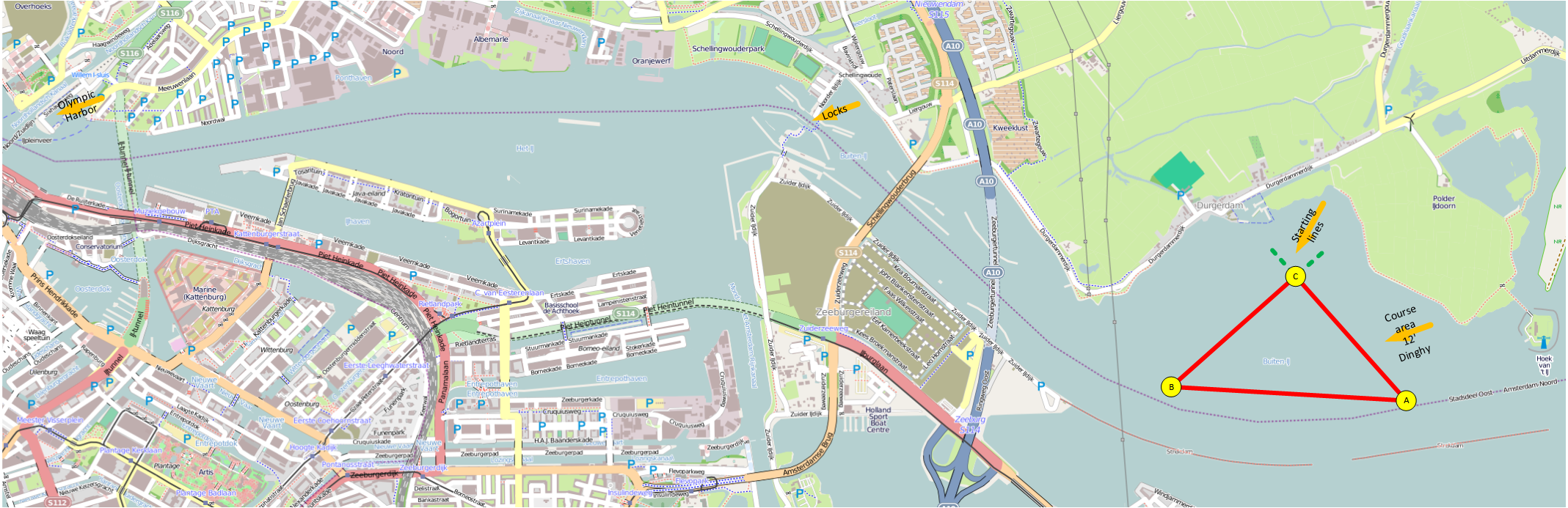
Course area and course for the 12' Dinghy

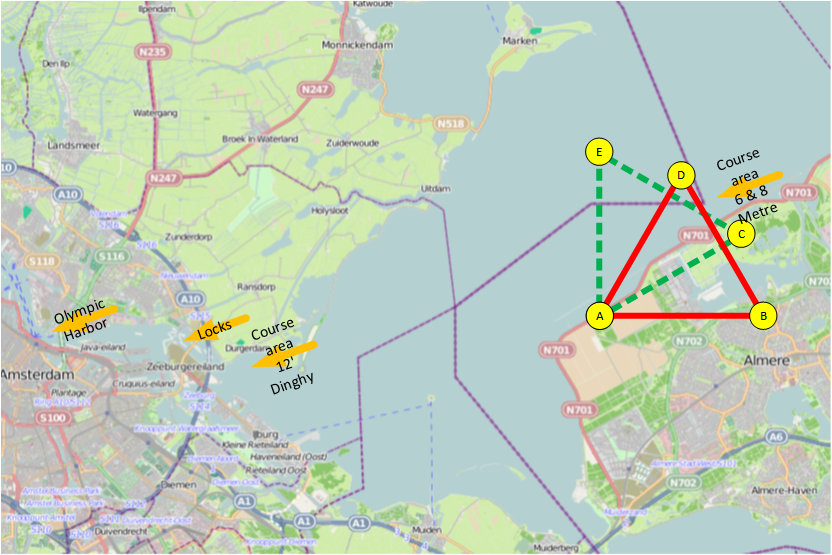
Course area and courses for the 6 Metre and 8 Metre

In 1932 a dam was built between the North Sea and the Zuiderzee and the Zuiderzee was renamed IJsselmeer. As result of this the lake now contains fresh water. Inside the lake new land was reclaimed. At this moment the center of the 1928 6 and 8 Metre course is located in the city of Almere. Also the city of Amsterdam reclaimed land from the sea and moved towards the lake. When the sailors from the 1928 Summer Olympics could return to their venue they would hardly recognize it.

== Competition ==
=== Overview ===
Continents	Countries	Classes	Boats	Male	Female
4	23	3	41	124	2

=== Continents ===
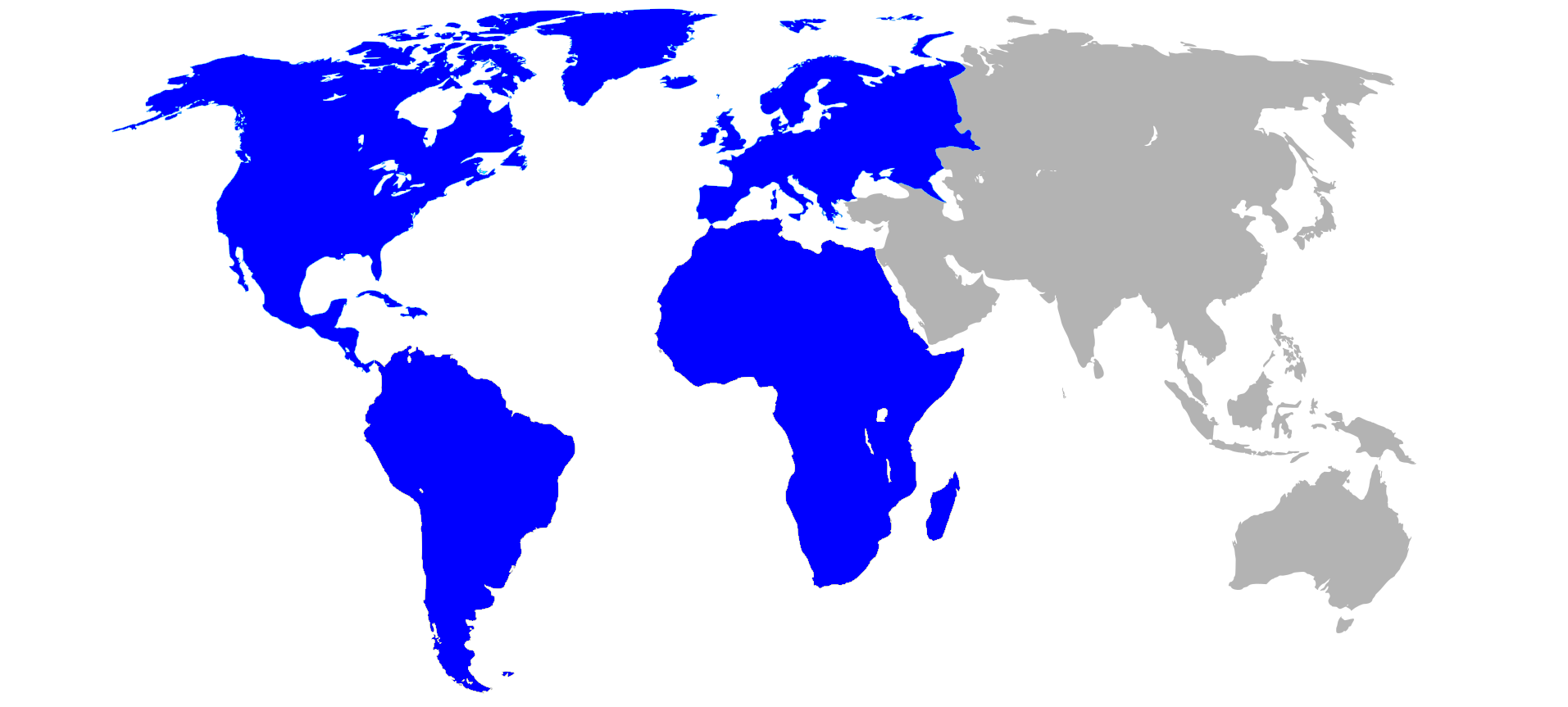
Map of Participating Sailing Continents at the 1928 Summer Olympics ● Green = Participating for the first time ● Blue = Participating ● Light Blue = Have previously participated

● Africa
● Europe
● North America
● South America

=== Countries ===
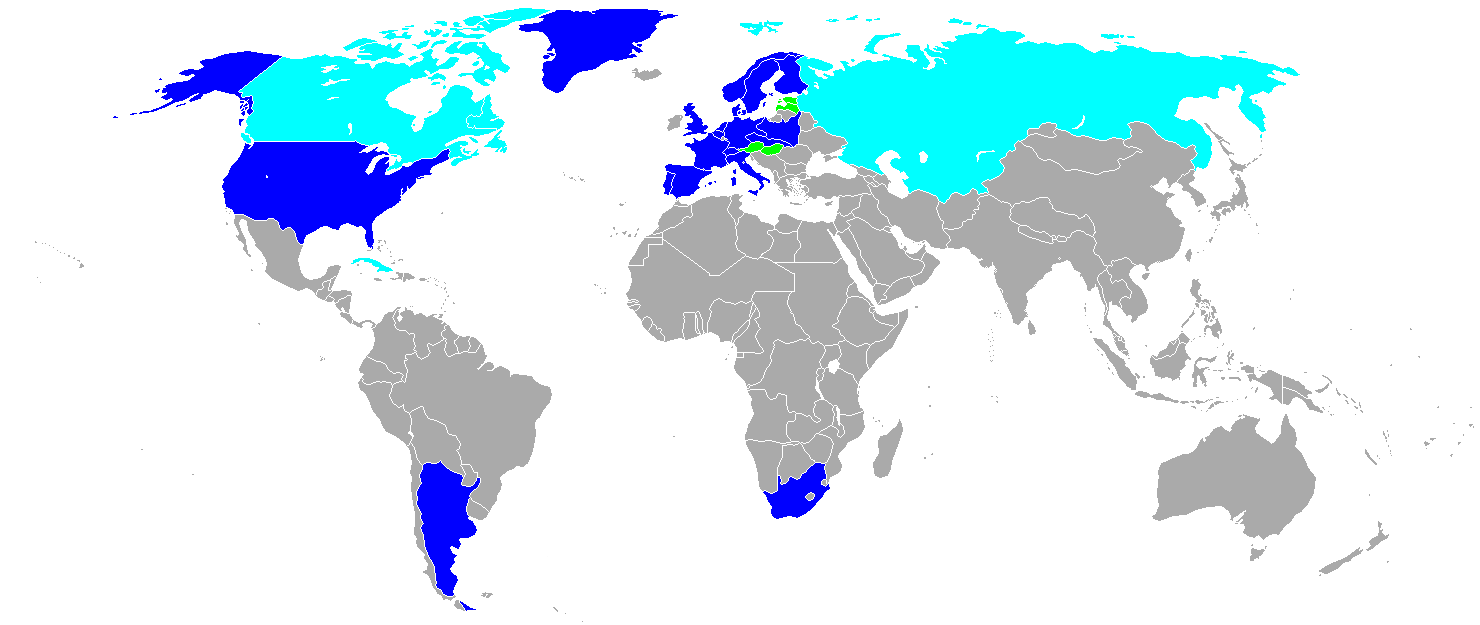
Map of Participating Sailing Countries at the 1928 Summer Olympics ● Green = Participating for the first time ● Blue = Participating ● Light Blue = Have previously participated

- Argentina (5)
- Austria (1)
- Belgium (6)
- Czechoslovakia (1)
- Denmark (5)
- Estonia (5)
- Finland (1)
- France (13)
- Germany (6)
- Great Britain (8)
- Hungary (6)
- Italy (12)
- Latvia (1)
- Monaco (1)
- Netherlands (12)
- Norway (9)
- Poland (2)
- Portugal (4)
- South Africa (1)
- Spain (6)
- Sweden (12)
- Switzerland (1)
- United States (11)

=== Classes (equipment) ===
The 1928 Olympic classes
Class	Type	Venue	Event	Sailors	First OG	Olympics so far
12' Dinghy	Dinghy	IJmeer		1	1920	2
6 Metre	Keelboat	Zuiderzee		3	1908	5
8 Metre	Keelboat	Zuiderzee		6	1908	5
Legend: = Mixed gender event
The 1928 Olympic Classes in action 12' Dinghy 6 Metre 8 Metre

== Race schedule ==
●	Opening ceremony	●	Event competitions	●	Event finals	●	Closing ceremony

Date	July						August											
Date	26th Thu	27th Fri	28th Sat	29th Sun	30th Mon	31st Tue	1st Wed	2nd Thu	3rd Fri	4th Sat	5th Sun	6th Mon	7th Tue	8th Wed	9th Thu	10th Fri	11th Sat	12th Sun
Sailing								● ● ●	● ● ●	● ● ●	● ● ●	Spare day	● ● ●	● ● ●	● ●			
Total gold medals														1	2			
Ceremonies	●																	●

== Medal summary ==
Event	Gold	Silver	Bronze
1928: 12' Dinghy	Sweden (SWE); Sven Thorell	Norway (NOR); Henrik Robert	Finland (FIN); Bertil Broman
1928: 6 Metre	Norway (NOR); Johan Anker; Erik Anker; Håkon Bryhn; Crown Prince Olav	Denmark (DEN); Vilhelm Vett; Aage Høy-Petersen; Niels Otto Møller; Peter Schlütter	Estonia (EST); Nikolai Vekšin; Andreas Faehlmann; Georg Faehlmann; Eberhard Vogdt; William von Wirén
1928: 8 Metre	France (FRA); Donatien Bouché; André Derrien; Virginie Hériot; André Lesauvage; Jean Lesieur; Carl de la Sablière	Netherlands (NED); Johannes van Hoolwerff; Lambertus Doedes; Hendrik Kersken; Cornelis van Staveren; Gerard de Vries Lentsch; Maarten de Wit	Sweden (SWE); Clarence Hammar; Tore Holm; Carl Sandblom; John Sandblom; Philip Sandblom; Wilhelm Törsleff

== Medal table ==
Rank	Nation	Gold	Silver	Bronze	Total
1	Norway	1	1	0	2
2	Sweden	1	0	1	2
3	France	1	0	0	1
4	Denmark	0	1	0	1
4	Netherlands	0	1	0	1
6	Estonia	0	0	1	1
6	Finland	0	0	1	1
Totals (7 entries)		3	3	3	9

== Notes ==
=== Quality of racing ===
This Olympic sailing regatta can be considered as the first Olympic regatta with a high quality of racing since there were:

- Well selected classes that represented sailing
- Sufficient competitors per class
- Good and fair sailing conditions

=== Amateurism as defined by the National Authority in The Netherlands ===
An amateur is he who fulfils the minimum requirements as laid down by the International Olympic Committee.
The contestants must be members of a recognized Yacht Club. Officers and Reserve Officers of the Navy or the Mercantile Marine are regarded as amateurs.

— Koninklijke Verbonden Nederlandsche Watersportvereenigingen, The Ninth Olympiad Amsterdam 1928:Official Report

== Other information ==
=== Sailing ===
During the sailing regattas at the 1928 Summer Olympics among others the following persons were competing in the various classes:

- Norway, Crown Prince of Norway, Crown Prince Olav in the 6 Metre
- France, First full-time yachtwoman, Virginie Hériot in the 8 Metre
- United States, United States yachting legend and inventor of the Swimfin, Owen Churchill in the 8 Metre
- Norway, Owner of Wilh. Wilhelmsen, Norway, Wilhelm Wilhelmsen Jr. in the 8 Metre
- Netherlands, Yacht designer and boat builder, Netherlands, Willem de Vries Lentsch in the 12' Dinghy
Sailors at the 1928 Olympic Games
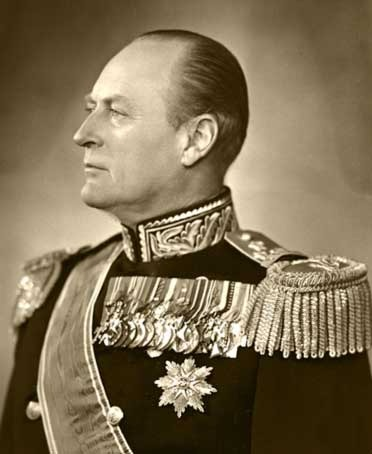
Olav V of Norway

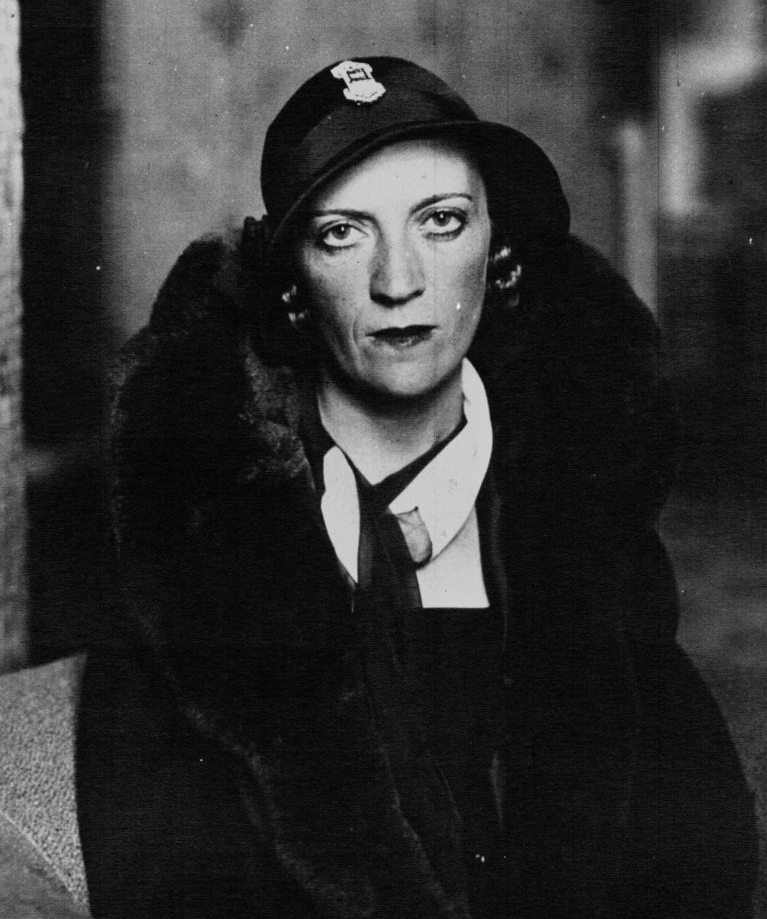
Virginie Hériot
