= Sweden at the 1928 Summer Olympics =

- IOC code: SWE
- NOC: Swedish Olympic Committee

in Amsterdam
- Competitors: 100 in 11 sports
- Flag bearer: Bo Lindman
- Medals Ranked 4th: Gold 7 Silver 6 Bronze 12 Total 25

Summer Olympics appearances (overview)
- 1896; 1900; 1904; 1908; 1912; 1920; 1924; 1928; 1932; 1936; 1948; 1952; 1956; 1960; 1964; 1968; 1972; 1976; 1980; 1984; 1988; 1992; 1996; 2000; 2004; 2008; 2012; 2016; 2020; 2024

Other related appearances
- 1906 Intercalated Games

Sweden competed at the 1928 Summer Olympics in Amsterdam, Netherlands. 100 competitors, 87 men and 13 women, took part in 66 events in 11 sports.

== Medalists ==
Medal	Name	Sport	Event	Date
Gold	Erik Lundqvist	Athletics	Men's javelin throw	August 2
Gold	Sven Thofelt	Modern pentathlon		August 4
Gold	Sven Thorell	Sailing	Men's 12 foot dinghy	August 9
Gold	Arne Borg	Swimming	Men's 1500 m freestyle	August 6
Gold	Johan Richthoff	Wrestling	Men's freestyle heavyweight	August 1
Gold	Thure Sjöstedt	Wrestling	Men's freestyle light heavyweight	August 1
Gold	Rudolf Svensson	Wrestling	Men's Greco-Roman heavyweight	August 5
Silver	Erik Byléhn	Athletics	Men's 800 m	July 31
Silver	Ossian Skiöld	Athletics	Men's hammer throw	July 30
Silver	Nils Ramm	Boxing	Men's heavyweight	August 11
Silver	Carl Bonde; Janne Lundblad; Ragnar Olson	Equestrian	Team dressage	August 11
Silver	Bo Lindman	Modern pentathlon		August 4
Silver	Eric Malmberg	Wrestling	Men's Greco-Roman featherweight	August 5
Bronze	Edvin Wide	Athletics	Men's 5000 m	August 3
Bronze	Edvin Wide	Athletics	Men's 10,000 m	July 29
Bronze	Inga Gentzel	Athletics	Women's 800 m	August 2
Bronze	Ruth Svedberg	Athletics	Women's discus throw	July 31
Bronze	Gunnar Berggren	Boxing	Men's lightweight	August 11
Bronze	Gösta Carlsson	Cycling	Men's individual road race	August 7
Bronze	Gösta Carlsson; Erik Jansson; Georg Johnsson; Gösta Carlsson	Cycling	Men's team road race	August 7
Bronze	Laura Sjöqvist	Diving	Women's 10 m platform	August 11
Bronze	Ragnar Olson	Equestrian	Individual dressage	August 11
Bronze	Carl Bjornstjerna; Ernst Hallberg; Karl Hansén	Equestrian	Team jumping	August 12
Bronze	Clarence Hammar; Tore Holm; Carl Sandblom; John Sandblom; Philip Sandblom; Wilhelm Törsleff	Sailing	8 metre class	August 9
Bronze	Arne Borg	Swimming	Men's 400 m freestyle	August 9

== Boxing ==
Men's Flyweight (– 50.8 kg)

- Lennart Bohman

- First Round — Bye
- Second Round — Lost to Hubert Ausbock (GER), points

Men's Heavyweight (+ 79.4 kg)

- Nils Ramm → Silver Medal

- First Round — Bye
- Quarterfinals — Defeated Hans Schonrath (GER), points
- Semifinals — Defeated Sverre Sørsdal (NOR), points
- Final Match — Lost to Arturo Rodríguez (ARG), KO-1

== Cycling ==
Four cyclists, all men, represented Sweden in 1928.

Individual road race

- Gösta Carlsson
- Erik Jansson
- Georg Johnsson
- Hjalmar Pettersson

Team road race

- Gösta Carlsson
- Erik Jansson
- Georg Johnsson
- Hjalmar Pettersson

== Fencing ==
Eight fencers, six men and two women, represented Sweden in 1928.

Men's foil

- Bertil Uggla
- Ivar Tingdahl

Men's épée

- Nils Hellsten
- Gunnar Cederschiöld

Men's team épée

- Nils Hellsten, Sidney Stranne, Gunnar Cederschiöld, Bertil Uggla

Women's foil

- Ebba Gripenstedt
- Hanna Olsen

== Modern pentathlon ==
Three male pentathletes represented Sweden in 1928. Bo Lindman won the silver medal and Sven Thofelt won the gold.

- Sven Thofelt
- Bo Lindman
- Ingvar Berg

== Sailing ==
Men

Athlete	Event	Preliminary series				Net points	Final rank	Final series				Net points	Final rank
Athlete	Event	1	2	3	4	Net points	Final rank	1	2	3	4	Net points	Final rank
Sven Thorell	12' Dinghy	6	1	1	2	6	2 Q	1	3	1	2	10	Gold medal
Hakon Reuter; Harry Hanson; Georg Lindahl; Yngve Lindqvist	6 Metre	2 Q	8	5	7	1 x 2nd	5 Q	3	6	6	—N/a	1 x 2nd	7
Clarence Hammar; Tore Holm; Carl Sandblom; John Sandblom; Philip Sandblom; Wilhelm Törsleff	8 Metre	3 Q	4	2 Q	1 Q	1 x 1st	2 Q	1	4	2	—N/a	2 x 1st	Bronze medal

== Swimming ==
Men

Athlete	Event	Heat		Semifinal		Final	
Athlete	Event	Time	Rank	Time	Rank	Time	Rank
Eskil Lundahl	100 m freestyle	1:03.0		Did not advance			
Sven-Pelle Pettersson	100 m freestyle	1:06.4		Did not advance			
Arne Borg	400 m freestyle	5:09.6		5:05.4		5:04.6	3rd place, bronze medalist(s)
Arne Borg	1500 m freestyle	20:14.2	1 Q	20:42.0	1 Q	19:51.8 OR	1st place, gold medalist(s)
Roland Johansson	100 m backstroke	1:17.4		Did not advance			
Eskil Lundahl	100 m backstroke	1:14.4		Unknown		Did not advance	
Erik Harling	200 m breaststroke	2:56.4		2:57.2		2:56.8	5
Tage Wissnell	200 m breaststroke	Unknown		Did not advance			
Aulo Gustafsson; Sven-Pelle Pettersson; Eskil Lundahl; Arne Borg	4 × 200 m freestyle relay	—N/a		10:03.2		10:01.8	5

Women

Athlete	Event	Heat		Semifinal		Final	
Athlete	Event	Time	Rank	Time	Rank	Time	Rank
Marianne Gustafsson	200 m breaststroke	3:27.0		Unknown		Did not advance	
Brita Hazelius	200 m breaststroke	3:21.6		3.21.4		3:23.0	6
