= Sailing at the 1928 Summer Olympics – 8 Metre =

8 Metre at the Games of the IX Olympiad
- Line drawing of the 8 Metre
- Venue: Zuiderzee
- Dates: First race: August 2, 1928; Last race: August 9, 1928
- Competitors: 43 Male and 2 Female from 8 nations
- Teams: 8

Medalists
1st place, gold medalist(s)		Donatien Bouché; André Derrien; Virginie Hériot; André Lesauvage; Jean Lesieur;Carl de la Sablière	France
2nd place, silver medalist(s)		Johannes van Hoolwerff; Lambertus Doedes; Henk Kersken; Maarten de Wit; Cornelis van Staveren; Gerard de Vries Lentsch	Netherlands
3rd place, bronze medalist(s)		Clarence Hammar; Tore Holm; Carl Sandblom; John Sandblom; Philip Sandblom; Wilhelm Törsleff	Sweden

The 8 Metre was a sailing event on the Sailing at the 1928 Summer Olympics program in Amsterdam. Seven races were scheduled. 45 sailors, on 8 boats, from 8 nations competed.

== Race schedule ==
●	Event competitions	●	Event finals

Date	August							
Date	2nd Thu	3rd Fri	4th Sat	5th Sun	6th Mon	7th Tue	8th Wed	9th
8 Metre	●	●	●	●	Spare day	●	●	●
Total gold medals								1

== Course area and course configuration ==
For the 8 Metre the used courses were about 5 nm out of the locks, East of the Isle of Marken on the Zuiderzee.

At that time the Zuiderzee had an open connection with the North Sea. The sea water was salt or at best brackish. Waves could be steep and short due to the shallow waters.

1928 Olympic Course Areas

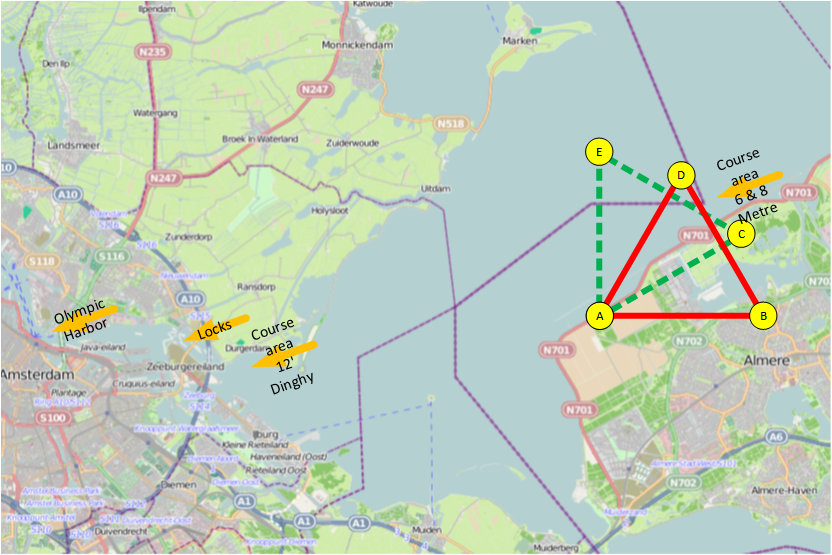
Course area and courses for the 8 Metre

== Weather conditions ==
Date	Race	Wind speed	Wind direction
2-AUG-1928	1st Race	7 knots (3.6 m/s) - 10 knots (5.1 m/s)	
3-AUG-1928	2nd Race	8 knots (4.1 m/s) - 11 knots (5.7 m/s)	
4-AUG-1928	3rd Race	11 knots (5.7 m/s) - 17 knots (8.7 m/s)	
5-AUG-1928	4th Race	13 knots (6.7 m/s) - 21 knots (11 m/s)	
7-AUG-1928	5th Race	8 knots (4.1 m/s) - 11 knots (5.7 m/s)	
8-AUG-1928	6th Race	10 knots (5.1 m/s) - 13 knots (6.7 m/s)	
9-AUG-1928	7th Race	10 knots (5.1 m/s) - 15 knots (7.7 m/s)	

== Results ==
The 1928 Olympic scoring system was used.

=== Final results ===
Rank	Country	Helmsman	Crew	Sail No.	Boat	Race 1		Race 2		Race 3		Race 4		Race 5		Race 6		Race 7		Total
Rank	Country	Helmsman	Crew	Sail No.	Boat	Pos.	Pts.	Pos.	Pts.	Pos.	Pts.	Pos.	Pts.	Pos.	Pts.	Pos.	Pts.	Pos.	Pts.	Total
1st place, gold medalist(s)	France	Donatien Bouché	André Derrien; Virginie Hériot; André Lesauvage; Jean Lesieur; Carl de la Sablière	F 1	L’Aile VI	7		1	Q	8	DNS	2	Q	4		1		1		3 x 1st
2nd place, silver medalist(s)	Netherlands	Johannes van Hoolwerff	Lambertus Doedes; Henk Kersken; Cornelis van Staveren; Gerard de Vries Lentsch; Maarten de Wit	H 1	Hollandia	1	Q	3	Q	1	Q	3	Q	2		2		3		2 x 1st 2 x 2nd 3 x 3rd
3rd place, bronze medalist(s)	Sweden	Clarence Hammar	Tore Holm; Carl Sandblom; John Sandblom; Philip Sandblom; Wilhelm Törsleff	S 3	Sylvia	3	Q	4		2	Q	1	Q	1		4		2		2 x 1st 2 x 2nd 1 x 3rd
4	Italy	Francesco Giovanelli	Carlo Alberto D'Albertis; Marcantonio De Beaumont-Bonelli; Mario Bruzzone; Guido Giovanelli; Edoardo Moscatelli	I 11	Bamba	8	RET	2	Q	6	RET	7	DSQ	5		3				1 x 2nd 1 x 3rd 1 x 5th
4	Norway	Bernhard Lund	Halfdan Hansen; Magnus Konow; Jens Salvesen; Wilhelm Wilhelmsen	N 25	Noreg	2	Q	8	DSQ	6	RET	7	RET	3		5				1 x 2nd 1 x 3rd 1 x 5th
6	United States	Owen Churchill	Manfred Curry; Frank Hekma; Nicholas Hekma; Ben Weston	US	Babe	6		6		3	Q	7	RET	8	DNS	8	DNS	8	DNS	1 x 3rd
7	Great Britain	Ernest Roney	Philip Falle; Thomas Riggs; Esmond Roney; Margaret Roney; Thomas Skinner	K	Feo	4		5		8	DNS	7	RET							1 x 4th 1 x ^{5th}
8	Argentina	Rafael Iglesias	Miguel Bosch; Pedro Dates; Horacio Seeber; Carlos Serantes	A	Cupidon III	5		8	RET	4		8	RET							1 x 4th 1 x ^{5th}

Legend: DNS – Did not start; DSQ – Disqualified; Q – Qualifying race; RET – Retired;
Gender: – male; – female;

== Daily standings ==
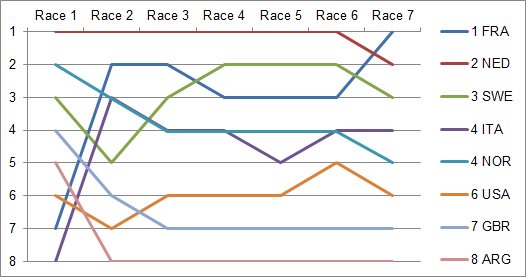
Graph showing the daily standings in the 8 Metre during the 1928 Summer Olympics

== Notes ==
=== Maximum number of entrants ===
For the Int. 8-metres class 1 yacht from each country, crewed by 6 amateurs maximum (maximum number of substitutes 6).

== Other information ==
During the Sailing regattas at the 1928 Summer Olympics among others the following persons were competing in the various classes:

8 Metre sailors at the 1928 Olympic Games
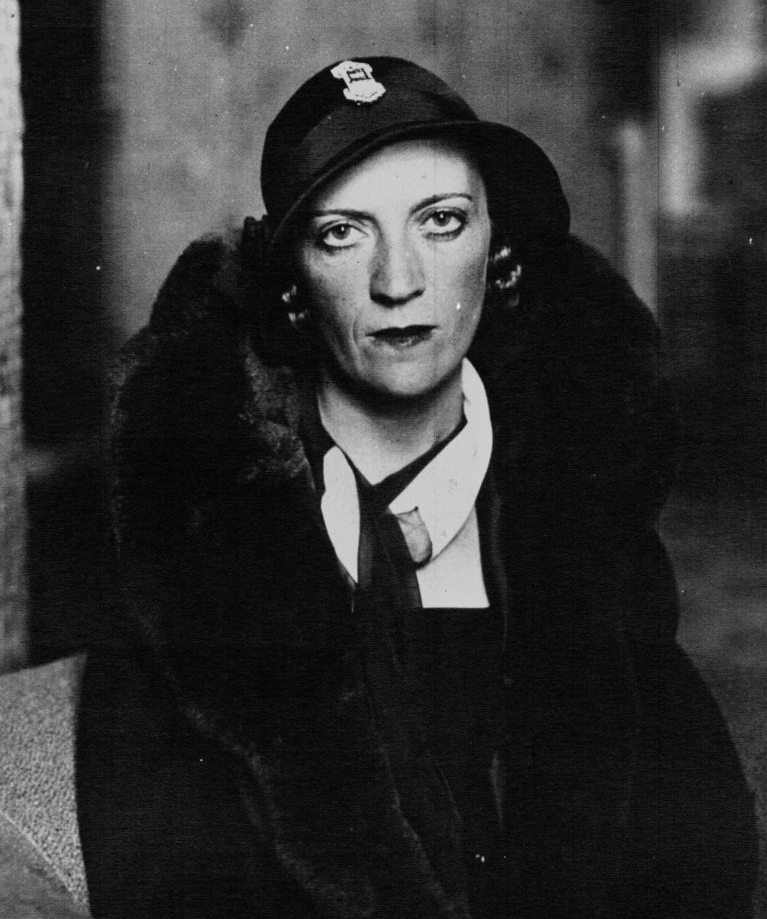
Virginie Hériot (FRA)

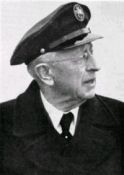
Magnus Konow (NOR)
