= Roney =

Roney is a surname. Notable people with the surname include:

- Antoine Roney (born 1963), American jazz saxophonist
- Bill Roney (born 1938), Australian rugby league footballer
- Blake Roney (born 1958), American businessman
- Cusack Patrick Roney (1809–1868), Irish civil servant
- Cusack Roney (1781–1849), Irish surgeon
- Ernest Roney (1900–1975), British sailor
- Esmond Roney (1907–1979), British Olympic sailor
- J. Albert Roney Jr. (died 1979), American politician and judge
- Jean Roney (born 1945), Canadian bowls player
- Joanne Roney (born 1961), Local government officer in Birmingham, England
- Joseph Roney (1935–2013), Haitian politician
- Keith Roney (born 1948), Canadian international lawn bowler
- Lew Roney (1922–2004), American basketball player
- Louis Roney (1921–2017), American opera singer
- Margaret Roney (1899–1983), British Olympic sailor
- Marimba Roney (born 1976), Swedish journalist and television host
- Matt Roney (born 1980), American baseball player
- Michael Roney (born 1954), American businessman
- Nels Roney (1853–1944), American building contractor and carpenter
- Paul Hitch Roney (1921–2006), American judge
- Peter Roney (1887–1930), Scottish footballer
- Shanti Roney (born 1970), Swedish actor
- Wallace Roney (1960–2020), American jazz trumpeter

== See also ==
- Rooney (disambiguation)
