= Sandblom =

Surname with notable Swedish sailors and academics

Sandblom is a surname. Notable people with the surname include:

- Carl Sandblom (1908–1984), Swedish sailor
- John Sandblom (1871–1948), Swedish sailor
- Linda Sandblom (born 1989), Finnish high jumper
- Philip Sandblom (1903–2001), Swedish academic, professor of surgery, and sailor

== See also ==
- Sundblom
