= Giovanelli =

Giovanelli is an Italian surname, derived from the given name Giovanni. Notable people with this surname include:

- Federico Giovanelli (1932–2018), New York mobster
- Federico Maria Giovanelli (1726–1800), Patriarch of Venice
- Francesco Giovanelli (1871–1945), Italian sailor, father of Guido
- Gordy Giovanelli (1925–2022), American rower
- Guido Giovanelli (1901–1975), Italian sailor
- Ivo Giovanelli (1919–2009), Croatian water polo player
- Louise Giovanelli (born 1993), British artist
- Massimo Giovanelli (born 1967), Italian rugby union player
- Miriam Giovanelli (born 1989), Italian-Spanish actress and model
- Renato Giovanelli (1923–1999), Italian architect
- Riccardo Giovanelli (1946–2022), Italian-born American astronomer
- Ron Giovanelli (1915–1984), Australian physicist and solar researcher
- Ronaldo Giovanelli (born 1967), Brazilian football player
- Ruggiero Giovannelli, Italian composer

== See also ==
- Palazzo Giovanelli, Venice
