= Blair Cochrane =

British sailor (1853–1928)

Personal information
- Nationality: British
- Born: 11 September 1853
- Died: 7 December 1928 (aged 75)

Sailing career
- Sport: Sailing
- Club: Bembridge Sailing Club

Olympic medal record

Sailing

Representing United Kingdom

Olympic Games
Gold medal – first place	1908 London	8 Metre

Captain Blair Onslow Cochrane OBE (11 September 1853 –7 December 1928) was a British sailor who competed in the 1908 Summer Olympics. He was helmsman of the British boat Cobweb, which won the gold medal in the 8-metre class.

Cochrane was born near Darlington, County Durham, the son of a wealthy land and coal mine owner. His great-grandfather was Archibald Cochrane, 9th Earl of Dundonald. He was educated at King's College School and the Royal Military Academy, Woolwich. He joined the Royal Horse Artillery and rose to the rank of captain.

In 1896, Cochrane, Lieutenant-Colonel Augustus Henry Macdonald Moreton, and Captain Ernest du Boulay instigated the Bembridge Redwing class, the earliest one design keelboat class with a One Design hull and restricted development rig.

In the 1908 Olympic Games, Cochrane and his brothers-in-law, Henry Sutton and John Rhodes, raced in Cochrane's yacht, Cobweb, that won the 8-metre class.

From 1909 to 1913, Cochrane was Rear Commodore of the Royal Victoria Yacht Club. He was also a member of Bembridge Sailing Club

He later served as County Director, Auxiliary Hospitals and Voluntary Aid Detachments on the Isle of Wight. He was appointed an Officer of the Order of the British Empire in the 1919 New Year Honours for his service during the First World War.

He married Mary Sutton, daughter of Sir Richard Sutton, 4th Baronet. Their daughter, Jean Cochrane, was also a top yachtswoman. She died unexpectedly on her yacht in 1946.
