= Karl Ljungberg =

Swedish civil engineer and sailor

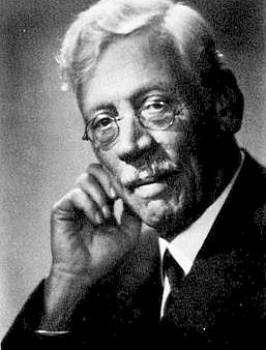
- Born: Karl Johan Ljungberg; 22 November 1868; Stockholm, Sweden
- Died: 11 July 1943 (aged 74); Stockholm, Sweden
- Occupation: Engineer

Karl Johan Ljungberg (22 November 1868 – 11 July 1943) was a Swedish civil engineer who was a professor at KTH Royal Institute of Technology. He also represented his native country at the 1908 Summer Olympics in Ryde, Isle of Wight, Great Britain in the 8 Metre keelboat, placing fifth.
