= Harri Roschier =

Finnish entrepreneur (born 11 February 1957)

Harri Roschier (born 1957) Helsinki is a Finnish entrepreneur. Roschier was the CEO of Talentum Oyj, a leading business-to-business media company in the Nordic countries between 1992 and 2006. During the Roschier years, the company became one of the fastest-growing media companies in terms of revenue and market capitalization in the Nordic countries, growing from a less than €10 million to a €100 million company. After leaving Talentum Roschier joined in 2007 Avaus Consulting - a management consultancy, marketing services and technology company. He has also worked as a board member of Futurice.

Until 1980, Roschier competed in alpine skiing, winning several medals in Finnish championships. He won the giant slalom in 1979 and 1980. In 1982 he went on to become the managing director of the Finnish alpine ski magazine Skimbaaja of which he even acted as the editor-in-chief in 1989. After selling the publishing company to Sanoma Oyj, he worked for some time for the special interest title publishing unit within Sanoma, before becoming the CEO of a public company at 35. Roschier is still an active skier and passionate, competitive sailor in the H-boat class and with his 45-footer Luna. In 2012 a syndicate headed by Roschier launched Luna a 8mR replica based on drawings by Charles E. Nicholson from 1936. Luna came second in the 8-metre worlds in 2012 in Cowes.
