= Ben Weston (sailor) =

American sailor (1892–1947)

Personal information
- Full name: Benjamin Price "Ben" Weston
- Nationality: American
- Born: January 27, 1892 Redondo Beach
- Died: January 9, 1947 Los Angeles

Sport

Sailing career
- Class: 8 Metre
Competition record
Sailing
Representing United States
Olympic Games
6th	1928 Amsterdam	8 Metre
- Updated on 13 March 2015

Benjamin Price "Ben" Weston was a sailor from the United States, who represented his country at the 1928 Summer Olympics in Amsterdam, Netherlands.

== Sources ==
- "Ben Weston Bio, Stats, and Results". Olympic Sports. Sports-Reference.com. Archived from the original on April 17, 2020.
