= Philip Falle (sailor) =

Jersey Olympic sailor (1885–1936)

Personal information
- Full name: Philip Vernon le Geyt Falle
- Nationality: British
- Born: 19 March 1885 Calcutta, British India
- Died: 2 January 1936 (aged 50) Gibraltar

Sailing career
- Sport: Sailing
- Class: 8 Metre

Philip Vernon le Geyt Falle DSO (19 March 1885 – 2 January 1936) was a Jersey sailor who represented Great Britain at the 1928 Summer Olympics in Amsterdam, Netherlands.

He was born in British India and grew up in Saint Helier, Jersey. He was educated at Reading School in Berkshire. During World War I, he served in the Army Service Corps and was awarded the Distinguished Service Order in the 1916 Birthday Honours.
