= August Olsson =

Swedish sailor

Personal information
- Nationality: Swedish
- Born: 18 August 1878 Stockholm, Sweden
- Died: 14 August 1943 (aged 64) Stockholm, Sweden

Sailing career
- Sport: Sailing
- Class: 8 Metre
Competition record
Sailing
Representing Sweden
Olympic Games
1908 London	8 Metre (5th)
- Updated on 9 May 2015

August Leonard Olsson (18 August 1878 – 14 August 1943) was a Swedish sailor who represented his native country at the 1908 Summer Olympics in Ryde, Isle of Wight, Great Britain in the 8 Metre.
