= Francesco Giovanelli =

Italian sailor

Personal information
- Nationality: Italian
- Born: 2 April 1871 Milan, Italy
- Died: 7 October 1945 (aged 74) Varazze, Italy

Sailing career
- Sport: Sailing
- Club: Yacht Club Italiano, Genova (ITA)
- Class: 8 Metre
Competition record
Sailing
Representing Italy
Olympic Games
4th	1928 Amsterdam	8 Metre
- Updated on 12 March 2015

Francesco Giovanelli (2 April 1871 – 7 October 1945) was a sailor from Italy, who represented his country at the 1928 Summer Olympics in Amsterdam, Netherlands. He is the father of Guido Giovanelli.
