= Sailing at the 1908 Summer Olympics – 8 Metre =

8 Metre at the Games of the IV Olympiad
- Line drawing of an 8 Metre yacht from 1908
- Venue: Royal Victoria Yacht Club, Ryde
- Dates: First race: July 27, 1908; Last race: July 29, 1908
- Competitors: 24 Male and 1 female (Documented) from 3 nations
- Teams: 5

Medalists
1st place, gold medalist(s)		Blair Cochrane, Charles Campbell, John Rhodes, Henry Sutton, Arthur Wood	Great Britain
2nd place, silver medalist(s)		Carl Hellström, Eric Sandberg, Edmund Thormählen, Erik Wallerius, Harald Wallin	Sweden
3rd place, bronze medalist(s)		Philip Hunloke, Alfred Hughes, Frederick Hughes, George Ratsey, William Ward, Extra: The Duchess of Westminster	Great Britain

The 8 Metre was a sailing event on the Sailing at the 1908 Summer Olympics program in Ryde. Three races were scheduled. Each nation could enter up to 2 boats. 26 sailors, on 5 boats, from 3 nation competed.

== Race schedule ==
●	Event competitions	●	Event finals

Date	July					August											
Date	27 Mon	28 Tue	29 Wed	30 Thu	31 Fri	1 Sat	2 Sun	3 Mon	4 Tue	5 Wed	6 Thu	7 Fri	8 Sat	9 Sun	10 Mon	11 Tue	12 Wed
8-Metre	●	●	●														
Total gold medals			1														

== Course area ==
The following course was used during the 1908 Olympic 6 Metre regattas in all three races:

- Start at Ryde Pier
- No.3. Fairway Buoy
- West Measured Mile Buoy
- Boyne Buoy off Portsmouth Spit
- Finish at Ryde Pier

Two rounds for a total of 16 nautical miles (30 km).

1908 Olympic Course Area, Ryde
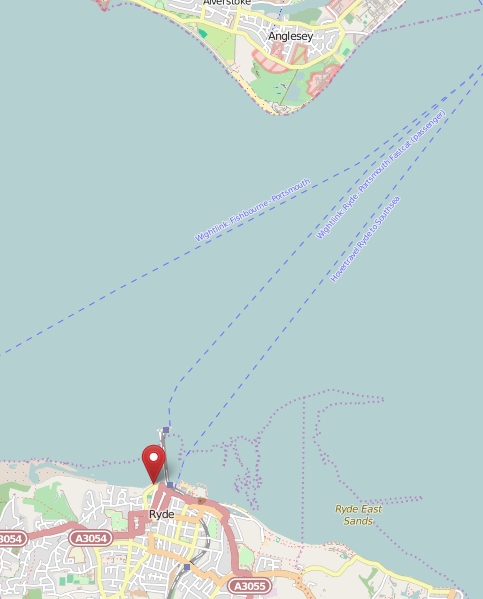

== Weather conditions ==
Date	Race	Description	Sea	Wind direction	Start
27-JUL-1908	1	Light wind. More wind in the second round	Calm	to	12:30
28-JUL-1908	2	Extreme light wind.	death calm		12:30
29-JUL-1908	3	Very light breeze, fluking. Late in the afternoon true wind, moderate	Calm		12:30

== Final results ==
The 1908 Olympic scoring system was used. All competitors were male.

Rank	Country	Helmsman	Crew	Boat	Race 1		Race 2		Race 3		Total
Rank	Country	Helmsman	Crew	Boat	Pos.	Pts.	Pos.	Pts.	Pos.	Pts.	Total
1	Great Britain	Blair Cochrane	Charles Campbell; John Rhodes; Henry Sutton; Arthur Wood	Cobweb	1	3	1	3	4	0	2 first places
2	Sweden	Carl Hellström	Eric Sandberg; Edmund Thormählen; Erik Wallerius; Harald Wallin	Vinga	5	0	4	0	1	1	1 first place
3	Great Britain	George Ratsey	Alfred Hughes; Frederick Hughes; Philip Hunloke; William Dudley Ward; The Duchess of Westminster (Extra)	Sorais	2	2	3	1	2	2	2 second places
4	Norway	Johan Anker	Eilert Falch-Lund; Einar Hvoslef; Magnus Konow; Hagbart Steffens	Fram	3	1	2	2	3	1	1 second place
5	Sweden	John Carlsson	Edvin Hagberg; Karl Ljungberg; Hjalmar Lönnroth; August Olsson	Saga	4	0	DNF	0	5	0	1 fourth places

Legend: DNF – Did not finish;
Gender: – male; – female;

== Daily standings ==
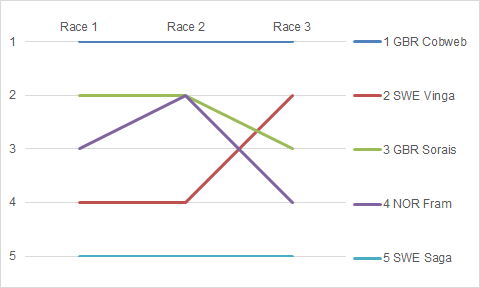
Graph showing the daily standings in the 8 Metre during the 1908 Summer Olympics

== Other information ==
=== Extra awards ===
Gilt commemorative medal:

- Blair Cochrane owner of Cobweb

Silver commemorative medal:

- Royal Gothenburg Yacht Club owner of Vinga
- The Duchess of Westminster owner of Sorais
- C. Wisbeck owner of Fram
