= Thomas Skinner (sailor) =

British Olympic sailor

Personal information
- Full name: Thomas G. Skinner
- Nationality: British

Sailing career
- Sport: Sailing
- Class: 8 Metre

Thomas G. Skinner was a sailor from Great Britain, who represented his country at the 1928 Summer Olympics in Amsterdam, Netherlands.

== Sources ==
- "Thomas Skinner Bio, Stats, and Results". Olympic Sports. Sports-Reference.com. Archived from the original on 18 April 2020.
