= Hjalmar Lönnroth =

Swedish sailor

Personal information
- Full name: Hjalmar Lönnroth
- Nationality: Swedish
- Born: 11 September 1856 Romelanda, Sweden
- Died: 15 July 1917 (aged 60) Gothenburg, Sweden

Sport

Sailing career
- Class: 8 Metre
- Updated on 2014-02-03

Arvid Martin Hjalmar Lönnroth (11 September 1856 – 24 July 1935) was a sailor from Sweden, who represented his native country at the 1908 Summer Olympics in Ryde, Isle of Wight, Great Britain in the 8 Metre.

Lönnroth was born in Romelanda, Kungälv Municipality, and died in Gothenburg.
