= Frank Hekma =

American sailor

Personal information
- Full name: Frank Jacob Hekma
- Nationality: American
- Born: April 18, 1911 Brooklyn
- Died: December 23, 1992 (aged 81) Key Largo

Sport

Sailing career
- Class: 8 Metre
Competition record
Sailing
Representing United States
Olympic Games
6th	1928 Amsterdam	8 Metre
- Updated on 13 March 2015

Frank Jacob Hekma was a sailor from the United States, who represented his country at the 1928 Summer Olympics in Amsterdam, Netherlands.

== Sources ==
- "Frank Hekma Bio, Stats, and Results". Olympic Sports. Sports-Reference.com. Archived from the original on November 21, 2015.
