= Simon de Wit (rower) =

Dutch rower

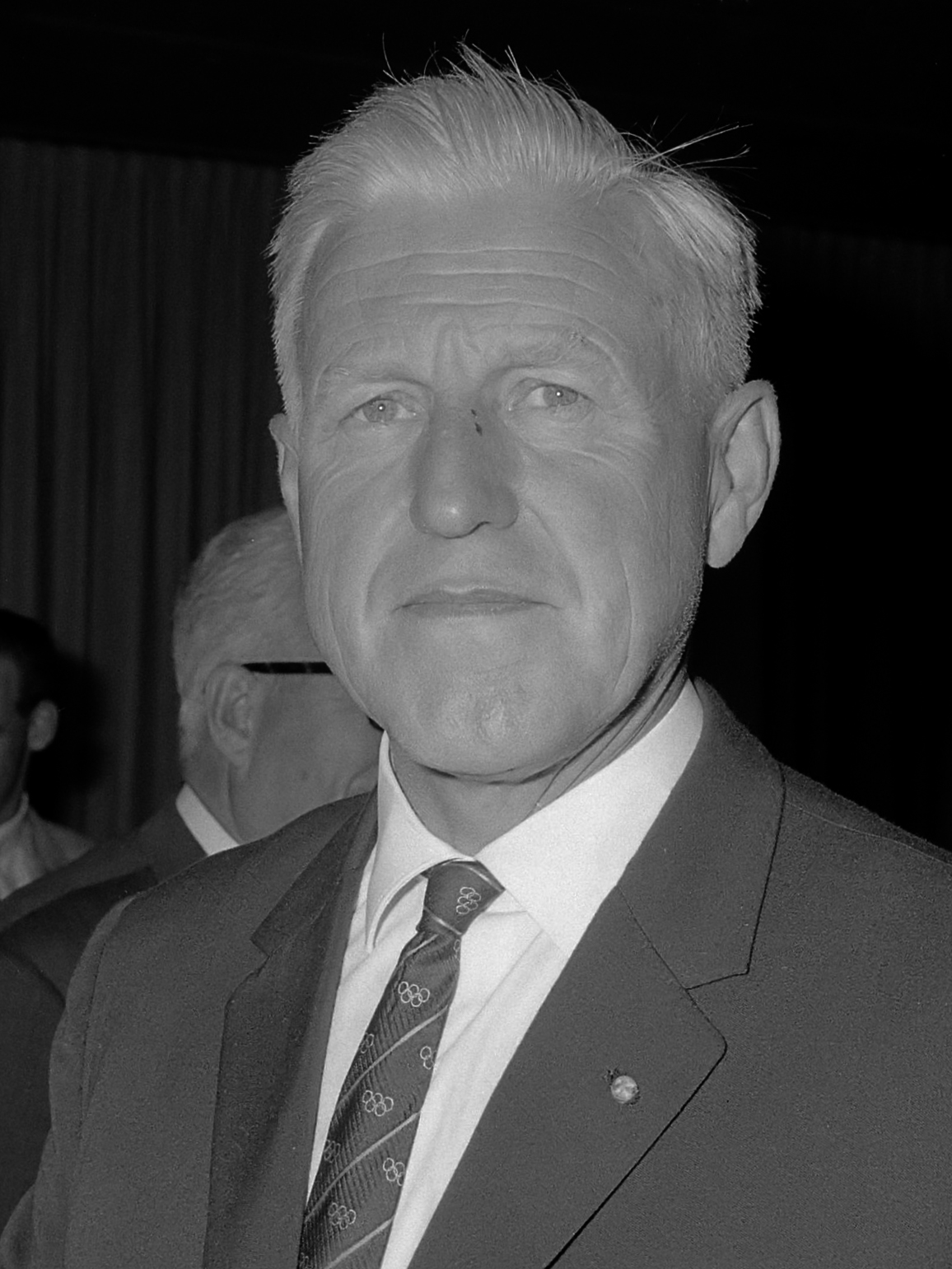
- Simon de Wit in 1964

Personal information
- Born: 24 August 1912 Zaandam, the Netherlands
- Died: 2 March 1976 (aged 63) Amsterdam, the Netherlands
- Relatives: Maarten de Wit (father)

Sport
- Sport: Rowing
- Club: Nereus, Amsterdam
Medal record
Men's rowing
Representing Netherlands
European Rowing Championships
Silver medal – second place	1937 Amsterdam	Coxed four

Simon de Wit (24 August 1912 – 2 March 1976) was a Dutch rower and the chief executive of the supermarket chain Simon de Wit.

De Wit was born in 1912 in Zaandam. His grandfather, also Simon de Wit, was the founder of the supermarket chain Simon de Wit. His father, Maarten de Wit, represented the Netherlands at the 1928 Summer Olympics in sailing.

De Wit competed at the 1936 Summer Olympics in Berlin with the men's coxed four where they came fourth. The same team also competed as a coxed four, with Gerard Hallie as coxswain, and they were eliminated in round one. Four of the five coxed four members remained together and won silver at the 1937 European Rowing Championships in Amsterdam.

De Wit was also a successful sailor, and was Chef d'équipe of the Dutch Olympic Sailing Team at the 1952 Summer Olympics as well as the country's flag bearer. He remained Chef d'équipe for the 1956 and 1960 Games, and was Chef de Mission of the Dutch Olympic team at the 1964 Summer Olympics. From 1943 to 1964, he was CEO of the family's supermarket chain.
