= Marcantonio De Beaumont-Bonelli =

Personal information
- Nationality: Italian
- Born: 30 August 1890 Naples, Italy

Sailing career
- Sport: Sailing
- Club: Yacht Club Italiano, Genoa (ITA)
- Class: 8 Metre
Competition record
Sailing
Representing Italy
Olympic Games
4th	1928 Amsterdam	8 Metre
- Updated on 12 March 2015

Marcantonio De Beaumont-Bonelli (born 30 August 1890) was an Italian sailor who represented his country at the 1928 Summer Olympics in Amsterdam, Netherlands.

He was the son of the Filippo, 3rd Marquis de Beaumont-Bonelli and Teresa Eboli, daughter of Marcantonio Doria, the Duke of Eboli.

== Sources ==
- "Marcantonio De Beaumont-Bonelli Bio, Stats, and Results". Olympic Sports. Sports-Reference.com. Archived from the original on 18 April 2020.
