= Carlo Alberto D'Albertis =

Italian sailor

Personal information
- Nationality: Italian
- Born: 26 July 1906 Voltri
- Died: 17 April 1983 (aged 76) Genoa

Sailing career
- Sport: Sailing
- Club: Yacht Club Italiano, Genova (ITA)
- Class: 8 Metre
Competition record
Sailing
Representing Italy
Olympic Games
4th	1928 Amsterdam	8 Metre
- Updated on 12 March 2015

Carlo Alberto D'Albertis (26 July 1906 – 17 April 1983) was a sailor from Italy, who represented his country at the 1928 Summer Olympics in Amsterdam, Netherlands.

== Sources ==
- "Carlo Alberto D'Albertis Bio, Stats, and Results". Olympic Sports. Sports-Reference.com. Archived from the original on 18 April 2020.
