= Pedro Dates =

Argentine sailor

Personal information
- Full name: Pedro Jacobo Dates
- Nationality: Argentine
- Born: 18 March 1907
- Died: 1 July 1961 (aged 54)

Sailing career
- Sport: Sailing
- Class: 8 Metre
- Updated on 13 March 2015

Pedro Jacobo Dates was a sailor from Argentina, who represented his country at the 1928 Summer Olympics in Amsterdam, Netherlands.

== Sources ==
- "Pedro Dates Bio, Stats, and Results". Olympic Sports. Sports-Reference.com. Archived from the original on 18 April 2020.
