= John Carlsson =

Swedish sailor

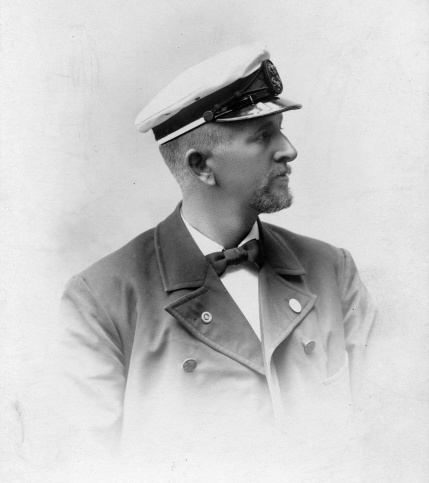
- John Carlsson

Personal information
- Full name: John Carlsson
- Nationality: Swedish
- Born: 5 January 1870 Stockholm, Sweden
- Died: 24 July 1935 (aged 65) Värmdö, Sweden

Sport

Sailing career
- Class: 8 Metre
- Updated on 3 February 2014

Johan Erik "John" Carlsson (5 January 1870 in Stockholm – 24 July 1935 in Värmdö) was a competitive sailor from Sweden, who represented his native country at the 1908 Summer Olympics in Ryde, Isle of Wight, Great Britain in the 8 Metre.
