= Nicholas Hekma =

American sailor

Personal information
- Full name: Nicholas Barry Hekma
- Nationality: American
- Born: October 18, 1906 Brooklyn
- Died: May 19, 1969 (aged 62) Greenwich, Connecticut

Sailing career
- Sport: Sailing
- Class: 8 Metre
Competition record
Sailing
Representing United States
Olympic Games
6th	1928 Amsterdam	8 Metre
- Updated on 13 March 2015

Nicholas Barry Hekma (1906–1969) was a sailor from the United States, who represented his country at the 1928 Summer Olympics in Amsterdam, Netherlands.

== Sources ==
- "Nicholas Hekma Bio, Stats, and Results". Olympic Sports. Sports-Reference.com. Archived from the original on April 18, 2020.
