= Mario Bruzzone =

Italian sailor

Personal information
- Nationality: Italian
- Born: 3 September 1887 Genoa
- Died: 25 September 1940 (aged 53) Genoa

Sailing career
- Sport: Sailing
- Club: Yacht Club Italiano, Genova (ITA)
- Class: 8 Metre
Competition record
Sailing
Representing Italy
Olympic Games
4th	1928 Amsterdam	8 Metre
- Updated on 12 March 2015

Mario Bruzzone (3 September 1897 – 25 September 1940) was an Italian sailor, who represented his country at the 1928 Summer Olympics in Amsterdam, Netherlands.
