= Einar Hvoslef =

Norwegian sailor

Personal information
- Nationality: Norwegian
- Born: 21 June 1876 Kristiania (Oslo)
- Died: 1 December 1931 (aged 55) Oslo

Sailing career
- Sport: Sailing
- Class: 8 Metre
Competition record
Sailing
Representing Norway
Olympic Games
1908 London	8 Metre (4th)
- Updated on 9 May 2015

Einar Hvoslef (21 June 1876 – 1 December 1931) was a sailor from Norway.

He was born and died in Oslo and raced for the Royal Norwegian Yacht Club. He represented his native country at the 1908 Summer Olympics in the 8 metre class sailing, finishing fourth with the boat Fram.
