= Miguel Bosch =

Personal information
- Full name: Miguel Alfredo Bosch Marín
- Born: 1 January 1905 Buenos Aires, Argentina

Sailing career
- Sport: Sailing
- Class: 8 Metre
Competition record
Sailing
Representing Argentina
Olympic Games
8th	1928 Amsterdam	8 Metre
- Updated on 13 March 2015

Miguel Alfredo Bosch Marín was a sailor from Argentina, who represented his country at the 1928 Summer Olympics in Amsterdam, Netherlands.

== Sources ==
- "Miguel Bosch Bio, Stats, and Results". Olympic Sports. Sports-Reference.com. Archived from the original on 18 April 2020.
