= Horacio Seeber =

Argentine sailor

Personal information
- Full name: Horacio Ricardo Seeber Demaría
- Nationality: Argentine
- Born: September 4, 1907 Buenos Aires
- Died: April 2, 1972 (aged 64)

Sport

Sailing career
- Class: 8 Metre
Competition record
Sailing
Representing Argentina
Olympic Games
8th	1928 Amsterdam	8 Metre
- Updated on 13 March 2015

Horacio Ricardo Seeber Demaría (1907-1972) was an Argentine sailor, who represented his country at the 1928 Summer Olympics in Amsterdam, Netherlands.

== Sources ==
- "Horacio Seeber Bio, Stats, and Results". Olympic Sports. Sports-Reference.com. Archived from the original on 22 July 2015.
