= Moscatelli =

Moscatelli is an Italian surname. Notable people with the surname include:

- Edoardo Moscatelli (1898–unknown), Italian sailor
- Riccardo Moscatelli (1971–1999), Italian race car driver
- Roberto Moscatelli (1895–unknown), Italian sailor
- Stefano Moscatelli (died 1485), Italian Roman Catholic prelate, Bishop of Nusco
