= Margaret Roney =

British Olympic sailor (1899–1983)

Personal information
- Full name: Margaret Helena Roney
- Nationality: British
- Born: 23 May 1899 Lambeth, Great Britain
- Died: 23 September 1983 (aged 84) Wandsworth, Great Britain

Sailing career
- Sport: Sailing
- Class: 8 Metre

Margaret Helena Roney was a sailor from Great Britain, who represented her country at the 1928 Summer Olympics in Amsterdam, Netherlands, as part of the crew of her 8 Metre keelboat Feo, helmed by her brother Ernest. Feo was built at Camper and Nicholsons in 1927, with yard number 352. She was the sister of Esmond Roney and Ernest Roney.

== Sources ==
- "Margaret Roney Bio, Stats, and Results". Olympic Sports. Sports-Reference.com. Archived from the original on 18 April 2020.
