= Arthur Wood (sailor) =

English sailor

Olympic medal record

Sailing

Representing United Kingdom

Olympic Games
Gold medal – first place	1908 London	8 Metre

Arthur Nicholas Lindsay Wood (March 29, 1875 – June 1, 1939) was an English sailor who competed in the 1908 Summer Olympics representing Great Britain. He was a crew member of the British boat Cobweb, which won the gold medal in the 8 metre class.
