= Frederick Hughes (sailor) =

British sailor (1866–1956)

Olympic medal record

Sailing

Representing United Kingdom

Olympic Games
Bronze medal – third place	1908 London	8 Metre

Frederick Saint-John Hughes (22 February 1866 – 3 November 1956) was a British sailor who competed in the 1908 Summer Olympics. He was a crew member of the British boat Sorais, which won the bronze medal in the 8 metre class.
