= Charles Campbell (sailor) =

British sailor

Olympic medal record

Sailing

Representing United Kingdom

Olympic Games
Gold medal – first place	1908 London	8 Metre

Sir Charles Ralph Campbell, 12th Baronet (14 December 1881 – 19 April 1948) was a British sailor who competed in the 1908 Summer Olympics. He was a crew member of the British boat Cobweb, which won the gold medal in the 8 metre class.
