= Esmond Roney =

British Olympic sailor (1907–1979)

Personal information
- Full name: Esmond Richard Roney
- Nationality: British
- Born: 12 July 1907 Kingston Hill, Great Britain
- Died: 22 January 1979 (aged 71) Camden, Great Britain

Sport

Sailing career
- Class: 8 Metre

Esmond Richard Roney (12 July 1907 – 22 January 1979) was a sailor from Great Britain, who represented his country at the 1928 Summer Olympics in Amsterdam, Netherlands. He was the brother of Margaret Roney and Ernest Roney.

Roney was educated at King's College School, Wimbledon and Merton College, Oxford, matriculating in 1925; whilst at University he played for their Greyhounds Rugby Union XV. After completing his BA degree he became a solicitor.

Roney married twice: firstly in 1931 to Agnes née Thomson, with whom he had a son; then in 1937 to Muriel, née Barham, with whom he had two sons and two daughters.

== Sources ==
- "Esmond Roney Bio, Stats, and Results". Olympic Sports. Sports-Reference.com. Archived from the original on 18 April 2020.
