= Edoardo Moscatelli =

Italian sailor

Personal information
- Nationality: Italian
- Born: 20 December 1898 Genoa
- Died: 13 June 1963 (aged 64)

Sailing career
- Sport: Sailing
- Club: Yacht Club Italiano, Genova (ITA)
- Class: 8 Metre
Competition record
Sailing
Representing Italy
Olympic Games
4th	1928 Amsterdam	8 Metre
- Updated on 12 March 2015

Edoardo Moscatelli (20 December 1898 – 13 June 1963) was a sailor from Italy who represented his country at the 1928 Summer Olympics in Amsterdam, Netherlands.
