= Sundblom =

Sundblom is a Finnish surname. Notable people with the surname include:

- Haddon Sundblom (1899–1976), American artist
- Julius Sundblom (1865–1945), Finnish editor and politician

== See also ==
- Sandblom
