= Edmund Thormählen =

Swedish sailor

Medal record

Sailing

Representing Sweden

Olympic Games
Silver medal – second place	1908 London	8 Metre

Edmund Gustaf Thormählen (21 July 1865 – 13 November 1946) was a Swedish sailor who competed in the 1908 Summer Olympics. He was a crew member of the Swedish boat Vinga, which won the silver medal (i.e. second place) in the 8 metre class.
