= Hjalmar Pettersson =

Swedish cyclist

Personal information
- Born: 7 December 1906 Uppsala, Sweden
- Died: 25 August 2003 (aged 96) Uppsala, Sweden

Cycling career
- Sport: Cycling

Hjalmar Pettersson (7 December 1906 – 25 August 2003) was a Swedish cyclist. He competed in the individual and team road race events at the 1928 Summer Olympics.
