= Gösta Carlsson =

Swedish cyclist (1906–1992)

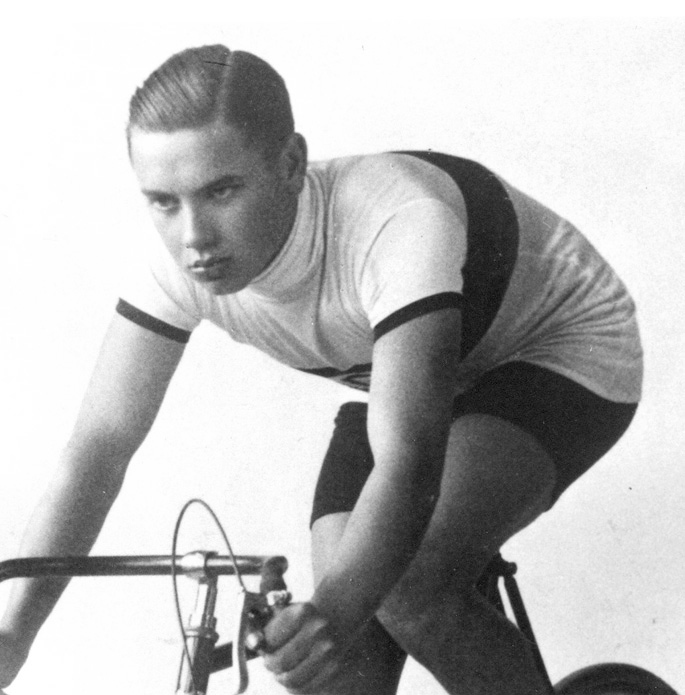

Personal information
- Born: 2 February 1906 Uppsala, Sweden
- Died: 5 October 1992 (aged 86) Uppsala, Sweden

Sport
- Sport: Cycling
- Club: IF Thor (−1927); SK Fyrishof (1928–)
Medal record
Representing SWE
Olympic Games
Bronze medal – third place	1928 Amsterdam	Individual road race
Bronze medal – third place	1928 Amsterdam	Team road race

Gustaf Vilhelm "Gösta" Carlsson (2 February 1906 – 5 October 1992) was a Swedish cyclist. He competed at the 1928 Summer Olympics and won bronze medals in the individual and team road races.

Nationally Carlsson won three individual (100 km, 1926–28) and nine team road race titles (1925–32). In retirement he worked as an elementary school teacher.
