= Gerard de Vries Lentsch =

Dutch sailor

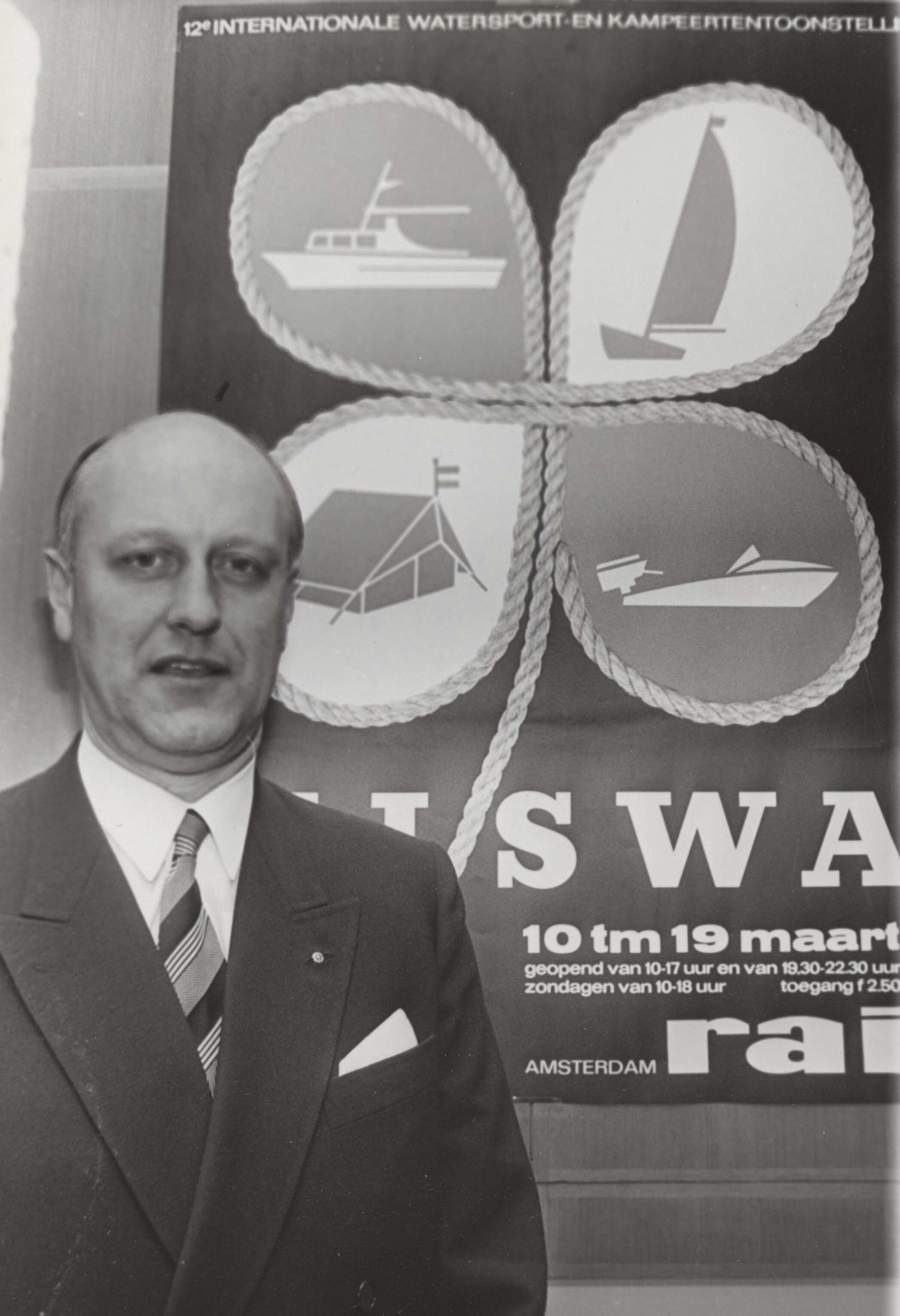

Personal information
- Full name: Gerardus de Vries Lentsch
- Nationality: Dutch
- Born: 23 November 1883 Nieuwendam, Netherlands
- Died: 9 July 1973 (aged 89) Oegstgeest, Netherlands

Sailing career
- Sport: Sailing
- Class: 8 Metre
Medal record
Sailing
Representing Netherlands
Olympic Games
| Silver medal – second place | 1928 Amsterdam | 8 Metre |
- Updated on 2014-01-22

Gerardus "Gerard" de Vries Lentsch (23 November 1883, Nieuwendam, North Holland – 9 July 1973, Oegstgeest) was a sailor from the Netherlands, who represented his native country at the 1928 Summer Olympics in Amsterdam. De Vries Lentsch, as crew member on the Dutch 8 Metre Hollandia, took the 2nd place with helmsman Johannes van Hoolwerff and fellow crew members: Lambertus Doedes, Cornelis van Staveren, Henk Kersken and Maarten de Wit.

Gerard de Vries Lentsch is the older brother of Willem de Vries Lentsch and the uncle of Wim de Vries Lentsch.

== Sources ==
- "Gerard de Vries Lentsch Bio, Stats, and Results". Olympic Sports. Sports-Reference.com. Archived from the original on 2014-01-03.
- "Zeilen, een bij uitstek Nederlandsche sport. De Olympische wedstrijden ditmaal zeer goed bezet. — Wat zal de wind doen ?" (in Dutch) (Morning ed.). Het volk : dagblad voor de arbeiderspartĳ. 1928-08-02.
- "The Ninth Olympiad Amsterdam 1928:Officiel Report" (PDF). Amsterdam: The Netherlands Olympic Committee. 1928. Archived from the original (PDF) on 2008-04-08.
