= Guido Giovanelli =

Italian sailor

Personal information
- Nationality: Italian
- Born: 30 November 1901 Genoa
- Died: 15 May 1975 (aged 73)

Sailing career
- Sport: Sailing
- Club: Yacht Club Italiano, Genova (ITA)
- Class: 8 Metre
Competition record
Sailing
Representing Italy
Olympic Games
4th	1928 Amsterdam	8 Metre
- Updated on 12 March 2015

Guido Giovanelli (30 November 1901 – 15 May 1975) was a sailor from Italy, who represented his country at the 1928 Summer Olympics in Amsterdam, Netherlands.
