= Cornelis van Staveren =

Dutch sailor (1889–1982)

Personal information
- Full name: Cornelis van Staveren
- Nationality: Dutch
- Born: 14 June 1889 Leimuiden, Netherlands
- Died: 10 April 1982 (aged 92) Oude Wetering, Netherlands

Sport

Sailing career
- Class: 8 Metre
Medal record
Sailing
Representing Netherlands
Olympic Games
Silver medal – second place	1928 Amsterdam	8 Metre
- Updated on 2014-01-22

Cornelis van Staveren (14 June 1889 in Leimuiden – 10 April 1982, Oude Wetering) was a sailor from the Netherlands, who represented his native country at the 1928 Summer Olympics in Amsterdam. Van Staveren, as crew member on the Dutch 8 Metre Hollandia, took the 2nd place with helmsman Johannes van Hoolwerff and fellow crew members: Lambertus Doedes, Henk Kersken, Gerard de Vries Lentsch and Maarten de Wit.

== Sources ==
- "Cornelis van Staveren Bio, Stats, and Results". Olympic Sports. Sports-Reference.com. Archived from the original on 2014-01-03.
- "Zeilen, een bij uitstek Nederlandsche sport. De Olympische wedstrijden ditmaal zeer goed bezet. — Wat zal de wind doen ?" (in Dutch) (Morning ed.). Het volk : dagblad voor de arbeiderspartĳ. 1928-08-02.
- "The Ninth Olympiad Amsterdam 1928:Officiel Report" (PDF). Amsterdam: The Netherlands Olympic Committee. 1928. Archived from the original (PDF) on 2008-04-08.
