= Johannes van Hoolwerff =

Dutch sailor (1878–1962)

Personal information
- Full name: Johannes Cornelis van Hoolwerff
- Nationality: Dutch
- Born: 13 April 1878 Hoorn, Netherlands
- Died: 2 August 1962 (aged 84) Heemstede, Netherlands

Sport

Sailing career
- Class: 8 Metre
Medal record
Sailing
Representing Netherlands
Olympic Games
Silver medal – second place	1928 Amsterdam	8 Metre
- Updated on 2014-01-22

Johannes Cornelis van Hoolwerff (13 April 1878 in Hoorn – 2 August 1962 in Heemstede) was a sailor from the Netherlands, who represented his native country at the 1928 Summer Olympics in Amsterdam. Van Hoolwerff, as helmsman on the Dutch 8 Metre Hollandia, took the 2nd place with fellow crew members: Lambertus Doedes, Henk Kersken, Cornelis van Staveren, Gerard de Vries Lentsch and Maarten de Wit.

== Sources ==
- "Johannes van Hoolwerff Bio, Stats, and Results". Olympic Sports. Sports-Reference.com. Archived from the original on 2014-01-03.
- "Zeilen, een bij uitstek Nederlandsche sport. De Olympische wedstrijden ditmaal zeer goed bezet. — Wat zal de wind doen ?" (in Dutch) (Morning ed.). Het volk : dagblad voor de arbeiderspartĳ. 1928-08-02.
- "The Ninth Olympiad Amsterdam 1928:Officiel Report" (PDF). Amsterdam: The Netherlands Olympic Committee. 1928. Archived from the original (PDF) on 2008-04-08.
