= Alfred Hughes (sailor) =

British sailor

Medal record

Sailing

Representing Great Britain

Olympic Games
Bronze medal – third place	1908 London	8 metre

Alfred Collingwood Hughes (1868 – 17 February 1935) was a British sailor who competed in the 1908 Summer Olympics. He was a crew member of the British boat Sorais, which won the bronze medal in the 8 metre class.
