= Georg Johnsson =

Swedish cyclist

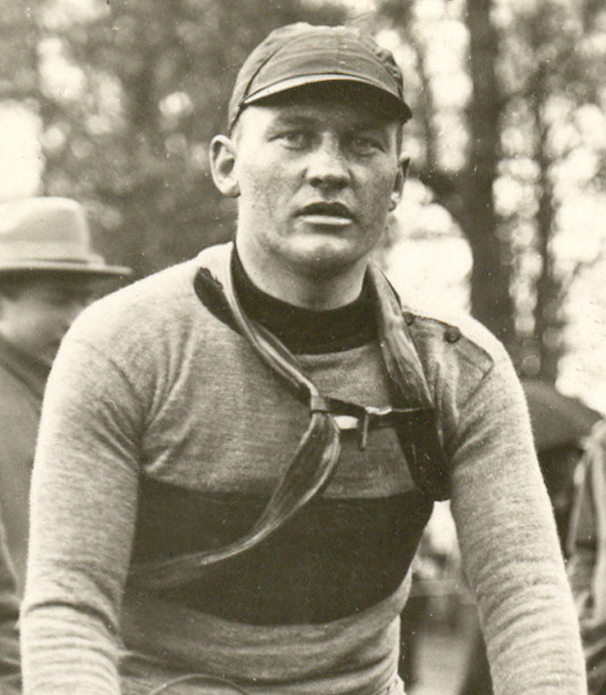

Personal information
- Born: 2 March 1902 Brunflo, Sweden
- Died: 31 May 1960 (aged 58) Enskede, Sweden

Cycling career
- Sport: Cycling

Amateur team
- IFK Enskede
Medal record
Representing SWE
Men's cycling
Olympic Games
Bronze medal – third place	1928 Amsterdam	Team road race

Ernst Georg Johnsson (2 March 1902 – 31 May 1960) was a Swedish road racing cyclist who competed in the 1928 Summer Olympics. He finished 17th in the individual road race and won a team bronze medal.

During his cycling career Johnsson won six national titles: four individual and two with a team. He participated in two world championships, with the best result of 10th place in 1932. Besides cycling he competed nationally in cross-country skiing. In retirement he ran a bicycle shop.
