= Lambertus Doedes =

Dutch sailor (1878–1955)

Personal information
- Full name: Lambertus Doedes
- Nationality: Dutch
- Born: 4 July 1878 Zutphen, Netherlands
- Died: 17 May 1955 (aged 76) The Hague, Netherlands

Sport

Sailing career
- Class: 8 Metre
Medal record
Sailing
Representing Netherlands
Olympic Games
Silver medal – second place	1928 Amsterdam	8 Metre
- Updated on 2014-01-02

Lambertus Doedes (4 July 1878 in Zutphen – 17 May 1955 in The Hague) was a sailor from the Netherlands, who represented his native country at the 1928 Summer Olympics in Amsterdam. Doedes, as crewmember on the Dutch 8 Metre Hollandia, took the 2nd place with helmsman Johannes van Hoolwerff and fellow crew members: Henk Kersken, Cornelis van Staveren, Gerard de Vries Lentsch and Maarten de Wit.

== Sources ==
- "Lambertus Doedes Bio, Stats, and Results". Olympic Sports. Sports-Reference.com. Archived from the original on 2020-04-18.
- "Zeilen, een bij uitstek Nederlandsche sport. De Olympische wedstrijden ditmaal zeer goed bezet. — Wat zal de wind doen ?". Het volk : dagblad voor de arbeiderspartĳ (in Dutch) (Morning ed.). 1928-08-02.
- "The Ninth Olympiad Amsterdam 1928:Officiel Report" (PDF). Amsterdam: The Netherlands Olympic Committee. 1928. Archived from the original (PDF) on 2008-04-08.
