= Clarence Hammar =

Swedish sailor

Personal information
- Full name: Karl Adolf Clarence Hammar
- Nationality: Swedish
- Born: 23 June 1899 Solna, Sweden
- Died: 31 December 1989 (aged 90) Haninge, Sweden

Sailing career
- Sport: Sailing
- Club: Royal Swedish Yacht Club
- Class(es): 1924 Olympic Class Monotype, 8 Metre
Medal record
Men's sailing
Representing Sweden
Olympic Games
Bronze medal – third place	1928 Amsterdam	8 metre class

Karl Adolf Clarence Hammar (23 June 1899 – 31 December 1989) was a Swedish sailor who competed in the 1924 Summer Olympics and in the 1928 Summer Olympics.

In 1924 he finished sixth in the Olympic Monotype. Four years later he was a crew member of the Swedish boat Sylvia which won the bronze medal in the 8 metre class.
