= Ernest Roney =

British sailor

Personal information
- Full name: Ernest John Roney
- Nationality: British
- Born: 8 June 1900 Lambeth, Great Britain
- Died: 23 March 1975 (aged 74) Blyth, Great Britain

Sport

Sailing career
- Class: 8 Metre
Medal record
Sailing
Representing Great Britain
Olympic Games
Silver medal – second place	1924 Le Havre	8 Metre
- Updated on 7 February 2015

Ernest John Roney (8 June 1900 – 23 March 1975) was a sailor from Great Britain, who represented his country at the 1924 Summer Olympics in Le Havre, France. Roney took the silver in the 8 Metre. In the 1928 competition he came 7th. He was the brother of Margaret Roney and Esmond Roney.

== Sources ==
- "Ernest Roney Bio, Stats, and Results". Olympic Sports. Sports-Reference.com. Archived from the original on 18 April 2020.
