= Henry Sutton (sailor) =

Sailor

Olympic medal record

Sailing

Representing United Kingdom

Olympic Games
Gold medal – first place	1908 London	8 Metre

Henry Cecil Sutton (26 September 1868 – 24 May 1936) was an English sailor who competed in the 1908 Summer Olympics representing Great Britain. He was a crew member of the British boat Cobweb, which won the gold medal in the 8 metre class.
