= Henk Kersken =

Dutch sailor, Olympic medalist

Personal information
- Full name: Hendrik Kersken
- Nationality: Dutch
- Born: 6 January 1880 Bergen op Zoom
- Died: 3 December 1967 (aged 87) Harlingen

Sport

Sailing career
- Class: 8 Metre
Medal record
Sailing
Representing Netherlands
Silver medal – second place	1928 Amsterdam	8 Metre
- Updated on 2014-01-22

Hendrik "Henk" Kersken (6 January 1880, Bergen op Zoom – 3 December 1967, Harlingen) was a sailor from the Netherlands, who represented his native country at the 1928 Summer Olympics in Amsterdam. Kersken, as crew member on the Dutch 8 Metre Hollandia, took the 2nd place with helmsman Johannes van Hoolwerff and fellow crew members: Lambertus Doedes, Cornelis van Staveren, Gerard de Vries Lentsch and Maarten de Wit.

== Sources ==
- "Henk Kersken Bio, Stats, and Results". Olympic Sports. Sports-Reference.com. Archived from the original on 2014-01-03.
- "Zeilen, een bij uitstek Nederlandsche sport. De Olympische wedstrijden ditmaal zeer goed bezet. — Wat zal de wind doen ?". Het volk : dagblad voor de arbeiderspartĳ (in Dutch) (Morning ed.). 1928-08-02.
- "The Ninth Olympiad Amsterdam 1928:Officiel Report" (PDF). Amsterdam: The Netherlands Olympic Committee. 1928. Archived from the original (PDF) on 2008-04-08.
