= Maarten de Wit =

Dutch sailor (1883–1955)

Personal information
- Full name: Maarten de Wit
- Nationality: Dutch
- Born: 30 May 1883 Wormerveer, Netherlands
- Died: 30 March 1965 (aged 81) Zaandam, Netherlands
- Relatives: Simon de Wit (son)

Sailing career
- Sport: Sailing
- Class: 8 Metre
Medal record
Sailing
Representing Netherlands
Summer Olympic Games
Silver medal – second place	1928 Amsterdam	8 Metre
- Updated on 16 May 2018

Maarten de Wit (30 May 1883 in Wormerveer – 30 March 1955 in Zaandam) was a sailor from the Netherlands who represented his native country at the 1928 Summer Olympics in Amsterdam. De Wit, as crew member on the Dutch 8 Metre Hollandia, took the 2nd place with helmsman Johannes van Hoolwerff and fellow crew members: Lambertus Doedes, Cornelis van Staveren, Henk Kersken and Gerard de Vries Lentsch.

De Wit was the son of Simon de Wit (1852–1934), founder of the Simon de Wit supermarket chain, of which Maarten was a director. His son, Simon de Wit (1912–1976), who was CEO from 1943 to 1964, was a successful sailor and rower as well and was Chef d'équipe of the Dutch Olympic Sailing Team in 1952, 1956 and 1960 as well as Chef de Mission of the Dutch Olympic team at the 1964 Summer Olympics.

== Sources ==
- "Zeilen, een bij uitstek Nederlandsche sport. De Olympische wedstrijden ditmaal zeer goed bezet. — Wat zal de wind doen ?" (in Dutch) (Morning ed.). Het volk : dagblad voor de arbeiderspartĳ. 2 August 1928.
- "The Ninth Olympiad Amsterdam 1928:Officiel Report" (PDF). Amsterdam: The Netherlands Olympic Committee. 1928. Archived from the original (PDF) on 8 April 2008.
