= Philip Crebbin =

British sailor

Personal information
- Nationality: British
- Born: 10 November 1951 (age 73)

Sport
- Sport: Sailing

Philip Crebbin (born 10 November 1951) is a British sailor. He competed in the 470 event at the 1976 Summer Olympics. Crebbin finished sixth. He was also favourite for representing the United Kingdom in the Soling at the 1980 Olympics but was unable to compete as the British sailing team boycotted the games.
