= Futurice =

Digital innovation and engineering company with Finnish roots

- Type: Joint stock company
- Industry: Information technology
- Founded: 2000 (Helsinki, Finland)
- Founder: Tuomas Syrjänen
- Headquarters: Helsinki, Finland
- Key people: Simo Leisti (CEO) Hanna Maria Sievinen (Chair of the Board)
- Products: Software development Mobile software
- Revenue: Turnover: 73 million € (2020)
- Owner: Founders, personnel, Finnish pension funds
- Number of employees: 629
- Website: www.futurice.com

Futurice is a digital software and engineering company with Finnish roots. The core business is developing and designing digital services and products. Futurice's mission statement is "to catalyze progress by building and learning together." It was founded in 2000 and by 2019 it had employed more than 500 professionals. In 2012 and 2013, Futurice was chosen by the “Great Place” and “Work Institute” as the best place to work in both Finland and in Europe.

== Operations ==
In the Deloitte Technology Fast 50, Futurice has been on the list for eight consecutive years, ranking first in 2008. Futurice's revenue in 2011 was about 9.8 million euros, and the revenue for 2017 was 50.2 million euros. The company's business has been profitable.

Futurice's headquarters is in Helsinki. In December 2008, a Tampere branch office was opened. In 2010, Futurice Gmbh was established, and a new office was opened in Berlin, Germany. At the beginning of 2012, Futurice Ltd was established with an office in London. In October 2015, Futurice opened offices in Stockholm and Munich, an Oslo office was opened in May 2018, and their latest office was opened in Stuttgart during the summer of 2019.

== Products and services ==
Futurice employs agile software development methodologies. The January 2008, IEEE Consumer Communications and Networking conference (CCNC) saw the introduction of the Apache-, MySQL- and PHP-development environment for Symbian S60 version, Personal Apache MySQL PHP (PAMP) that was developed in collaboration with Nokia and Futurice. Futurice was also accepted to the conference to demonstrate its experimental Peer-to-peer prototype, based on the PAMP development environment. Futurice is also prominent in a specialist role in the Forum Nokia section Talk to the Guru, directed towards other application developers. Futurice is one of the first European companies accepted as a member of Apple's iPhone-developer program.

== Company culture ==
Futurice CEO Tuomas Syrjänen was chosen as the Leader of the Year by magazine Fakta in 2013. Mr. Syrjänen has applied lean management methods in his work.
