= John Rhodes (sailor) =

English sailor

Personal information
- Full name: John Edward Rhodes
- Born: 13 February 1870 Wokingham, England
- Died: 6 February 1947 (aged 76) Ryde, England

Sailing career
- Sport: Sailing
Medal record
Sailing
Representing Great Britain
Olympic Games
| Gold medal – first place | 1908 London | 8 metre |

John Edward Rhodes (13 February 1870 – 6 February 1947) was an English sailor who competed in the 1908 Summer Olympics for Great Britain. He was a crew member of the British boat Cobweb, which won the gold medal in the 8 metre class.

He was the eldest son of John William Rhodes of Hennerton, Berkshire, a lieutenant in the King's Royal Rifle Corps (KRRC), by Marie Ada, eldest daughter of Edward Mackenzie of Fawley Court. He was commissioned as a Second lieutenant in the part-time 3rd (Royal Berkshire Militia) Battalion, Royal Berkshire Regiment, on 7 June 1887 and was promoted to lieutenant on 17 November 1888. He then transferred to the Regular Army as an officer in the KKRC on 29 October 1889. He was posted to the Isle of Wight (IoW) in 1892 and joined the Island Sailing Club. He later lived at Apley Rise in Ryde, IoW.

On 18 February 1897 he married Beatrice Zoe, youngest daughter of the late Sir Richard Sutton, 4th Baronet. Among his fellow sailors in the crew of Cobweb in 1908 were his brothers-in-law Henry Sutton and Blair Cochrane.

He served with the KKRC in the Second Boer War. On his return home he resigned from the army but on 23 May 1913 he took command of Princess Beatrice's Isle of Wight Rifles of the Territorial Force as Lieutenant-Colonel. In World War I he commanded the battalion in the disastrous action at Suvla Bay during the Gallipoli campaign, but was evacuated with sunstroke. He then served in wartime food control in the IoW and Channel Islands.

He served as commodore of the Bembridge Sailing Club and was a member of the Royal Victoria, Solent, and Lymington sailing clubs as well as the Island sailing club.

His wife died on 7 November 1921.

== Sources ==
- "John Rhodes". databaseOlympics.com. Archived from the original on 8 March 2007.
- Evans, Hilary; Gjerde, Arild; Heijmans, Jeroen; Mallon, Bill; et al. "John Rhodes". Olympics at Sports-Reference.com. Sports Reference LLC. Archived from the original on 24 September 2013.
- Burke's Peerage, Baronetage and Knightage, 100th Edn, London, 1953.
- Emma Elizabeth Thoyts, History of the Royal Berkshire Militia (Now 3rd Battalion Royal Berks Regiment), Sulhamstead, Berks, 1897/Scholar Select, ISBN 978-1-37645405-5.
