= Donatien Bouché =

French sailor (1882–1965)

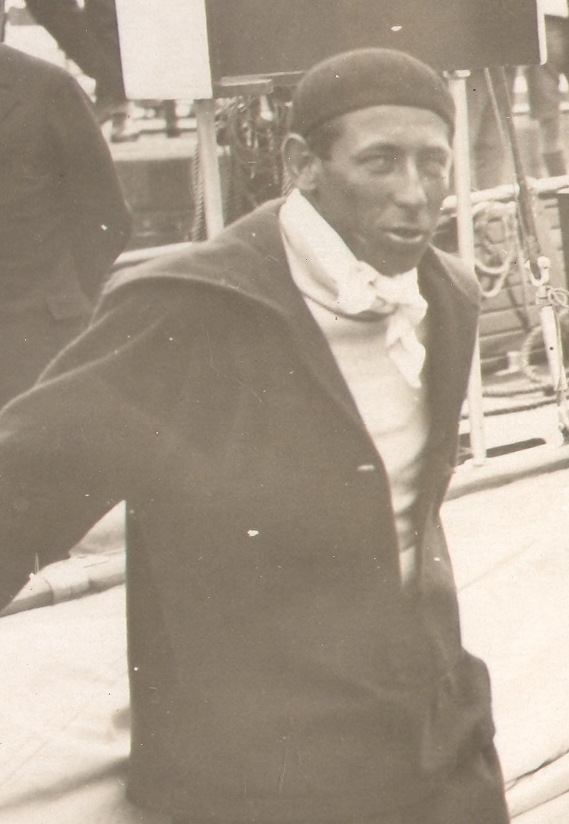

Medal record

Sailing

Representing France
Gold medal – first place	1928 Amsterdam	8 metre class

Donatien Bouché (May 10, 1882 – 1965) was a French competitive sailor who competed in the 1928 Summer Olympics.

In 1928 he was a crew member of the French boat l'Aile VI which won the gold medal in the 8 metre class.
