= André Lesauvage =

French sailor

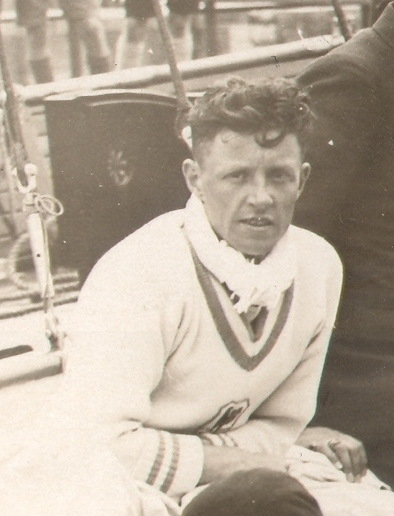

Medal record

Sailing

Representing France
Gold medal – first place	1928 Amsterdam	8 metre class

André Paul Henri Noël Lesauvage (25 December 1890 – 29 May 1971) was a French sailor who competed in the 1928 Summer Olympics.

In 1928 he was a crew member of the French boat l'Aile VI which won the gold medal in the 8 metre class.
