= Jean Lesieur =

French sailor and Olympian

Medal record

Sailing

Representing France

Olympic Games
Gold medal – first place	1928 Amsterdam	8 metre class

Jean Lesieur (8 November 1904 – 10 May 1943) was a French sailor who competed in the 1928 Summer Olympics.

In 1928, he was a crew member of the French boat l'Aile VI who won the gold medal in the 8-meter class.
