= André Derrien =

French sailor

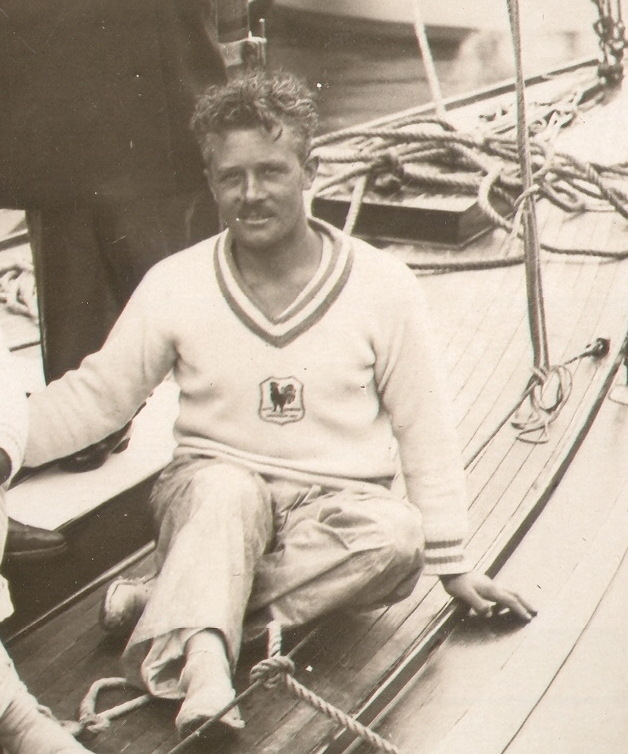

Medal record

Sailing

Representing France

Olympic Games
Gold medal – first place	1928 Amsterdam	8 metre class

André Derrien (July 31, 1895 – April 4, 1994) was a French sailor who competed in the 1928 Summer Olympics.

In 1928 he was a crew member of the French boat l'Aile VI which won the gold medal in the 8 metre class.
