= Carl de la Sablière =

French Olympic sailor (1895–1979)

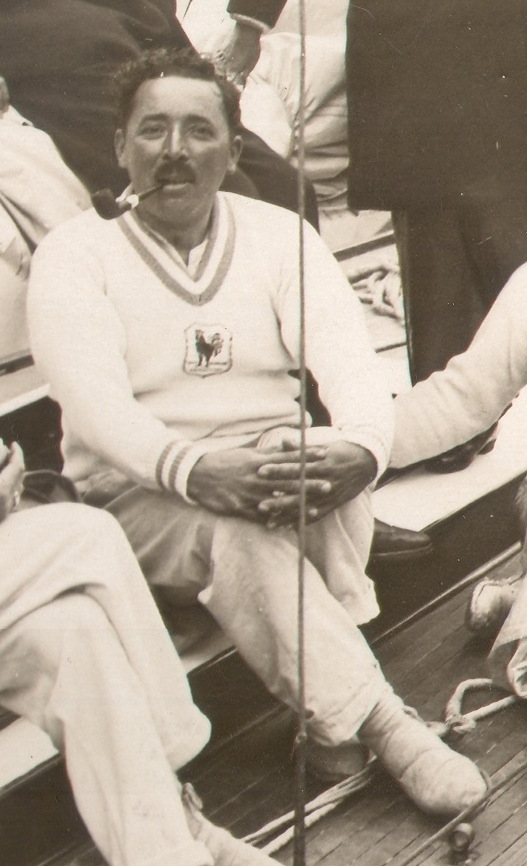

Medal record

Sailing

Representing France

Olympic Games
Gold medal – first place	1928 Amsterdam	8 metre class

Carl de la Sablière (April 26, 1895 – died 22 October 1979) was a French sailor who competed in the 1928 Summer Olympics.

In 1928 he was a crew member of the French boat l'Aile VI which won the gold medal in the 8 metre class.
