= Wilhelm Törsleff =

Swedish sailor

Medal record

Sailing

Representing Sweden

Olympic Games
Bronze medal – third place	1928 Amsterdam	8 metre class

Wilhelm Törsleff (November 26, 1906 – January 18, 1998) was a Swedish sailor who competed in the 1928 Summer Olympics.

In 1928 he was a crew member of the Swedish boat Sylvia which won the bronze medal in the 8 metre class.
