= Philip Sandblom =

Olympic medal record

Men's Sailing
Bronze medal – third place	1928 Amsterdam	8 metre class

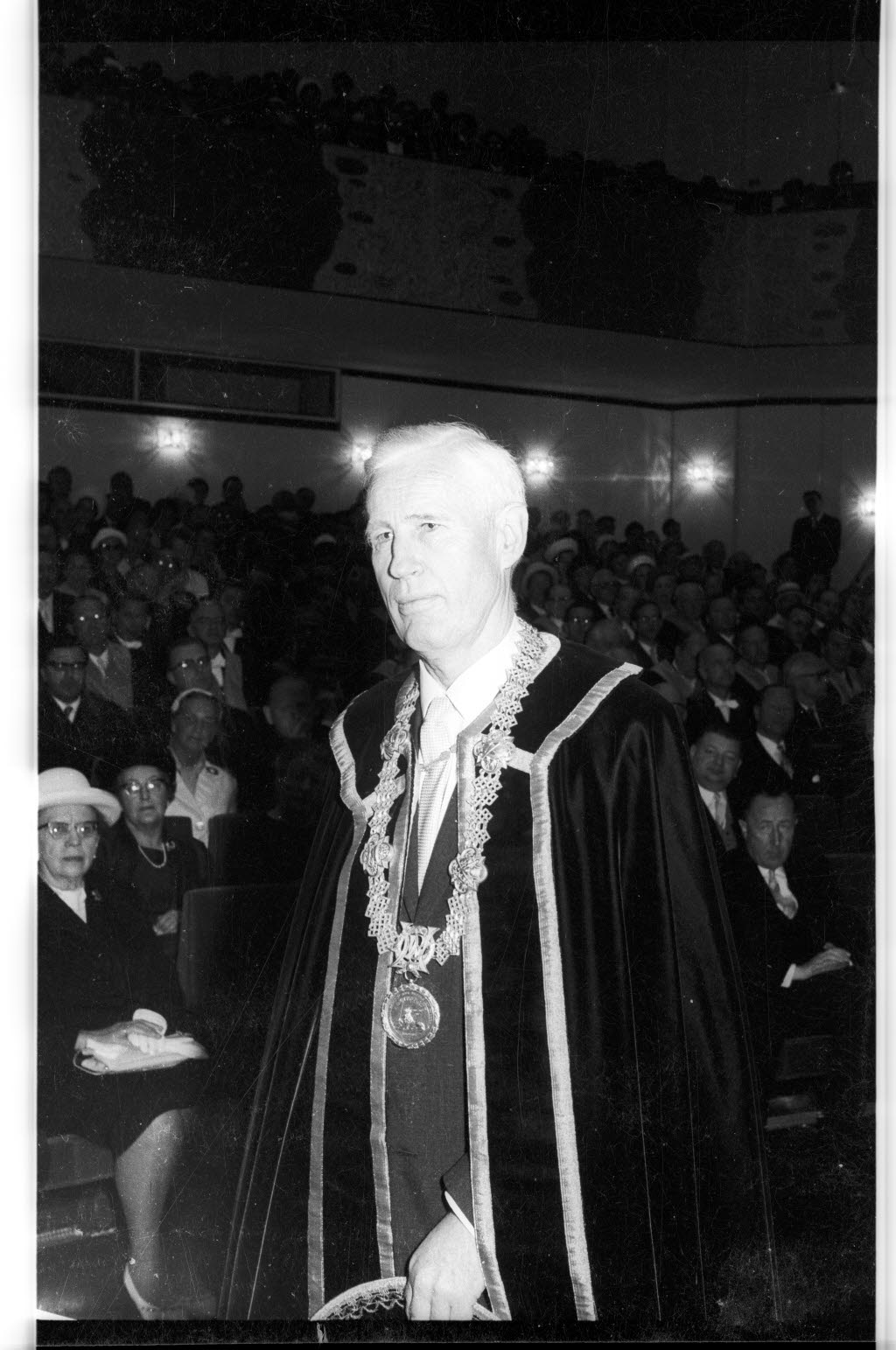
Sandblom at the 300th anniversary celebration of the foundation of the University of Kiel, Germany, 1965.

Philip Sandblom (October 29, 1903 – February 21, 2001) was a Swedish academician, professor of surgery and sailor who competed in the 1928 Summer Olympics. He served as rector of Lund University between 1957 and 1968.

Philip Sandblom was the son of the dentist John Sandblom, and was born in Chicago, Illinois, United States; like his father, he was also a prominent sailor in his youth. At the 1928 Summer Olympics in Amsterdam, he was a crew member of the Swedish boat Sylvia together with his father which won the bronze medal in the 8 metre class.

Sandblom graduated from the Karolinska Institute with the dissertation The tensile strength of healing wounds in 1944. In 1950, Sandblom was made professor of surgery at Lund University, and he later served as rector of the university in 1957–1968.

One of Sandblom authored books was Creativity and Disease: How illness affects literature, art and music (1992). After retiring from Lund University, Sandblom was active as a physician and scientist in San Diego, California, US, and Lausanne, Switzerland. He died in Lausanne in 2001.
