= Carl Sandblom =

Swedish sailor

Olympic medal record

Men's Sailing
Bronze medal – third place	1928 Amsterdam	8 metre class

Carl Sandblom (21 August 1908 – 1 June 1984) was a Swedish sailor who competed in the 1928 Summer Olympics.

In 1928, he was a crew member of the Swedish boat Sylvia which won the bronze medal in the 8 metre class.
