= John Sandblom =

Swedish sailor

Olympic medal record

Men's Sailing
Bronze medal – third place	1928 Amsterdam	8 metre class

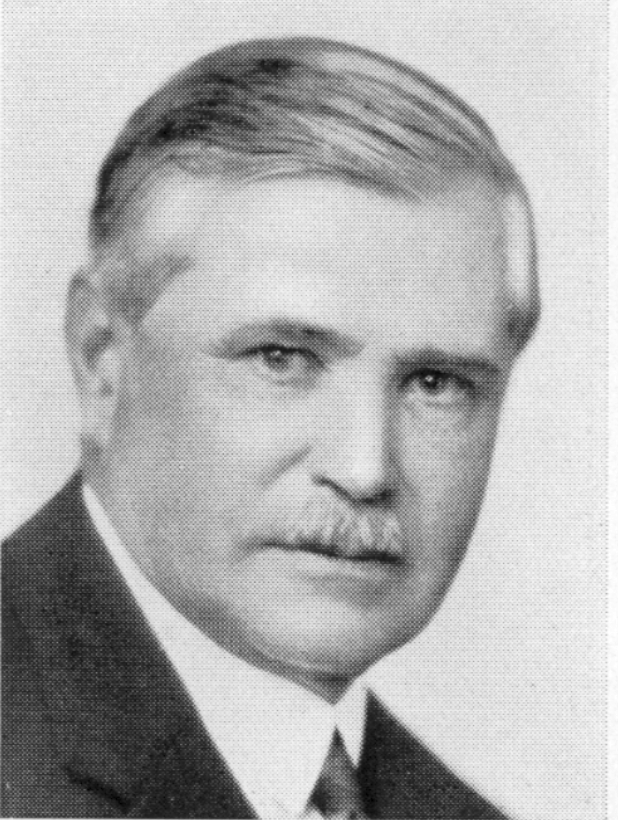
John Sandblom

John Sandblom (July 5, 1871 – July 24, 1948) was a Swedish sailor who competed in the 1928 Summer Olympics.

In 1928 he was a crew member of the Swedish boat Sylvia which won the bronze medal in the 8 metre class.
