= 8 Metre =

Type of racing yacht

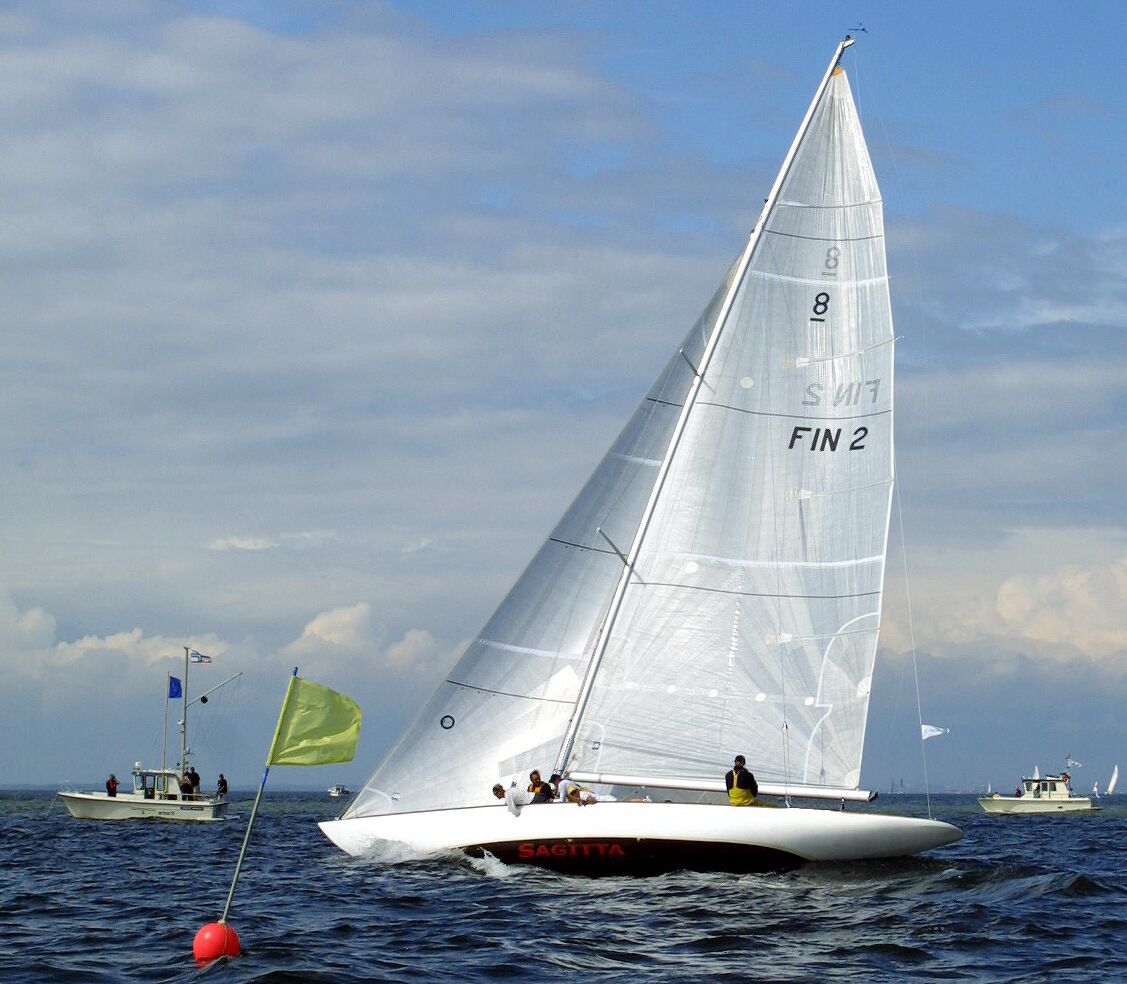
- Finnish 8mR-yacht Sagitta (FIN–2) designed by Charles Nicholson in 1929 and owned by Timo Saalasti.

- Class symbol

Development
- Year: 1907 (rule design)
- Design: Development class

The International Eight Metre class are class of racing yachts. Eight Metre boats (often called "Eights" or 8mR) are a construction class, meaning that the boats are not identical but are all designed to meet specific measurement formula, in this case International rule. Before WW II, Eights were the most prestigious international yacht racing class and they are still raced around the world. "Eight metre" in class name does not, somewhat confusingly, refer to length of the boat, but product of the formula. 8mR boats are on average some 15 metres long. Between 1907 and 2008 approximately 500 8mR boats were built, 177 of them have survived until today.

== History ==
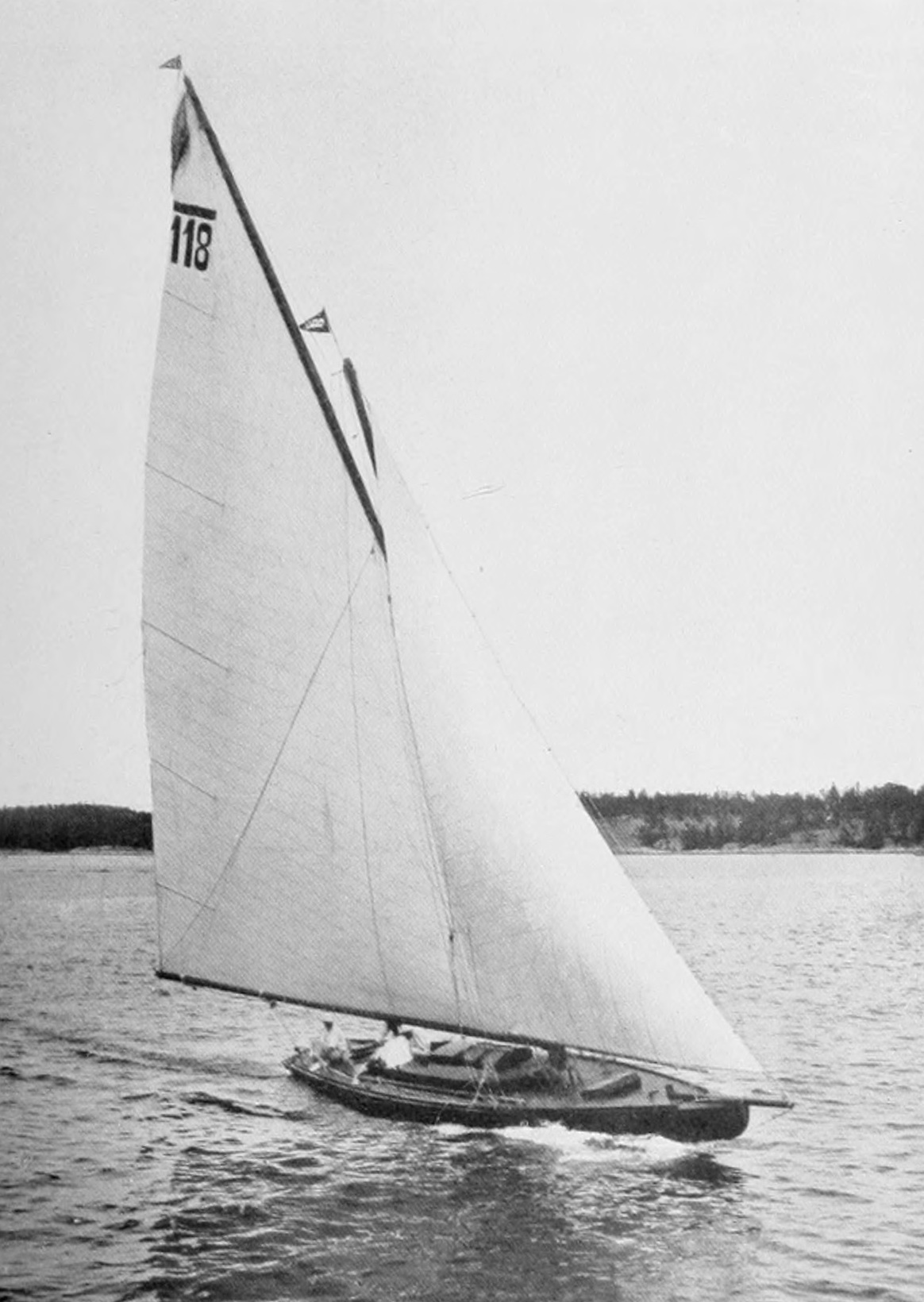
The Swedish silver medalist Sans Atout at 1912 Summer Olympics.

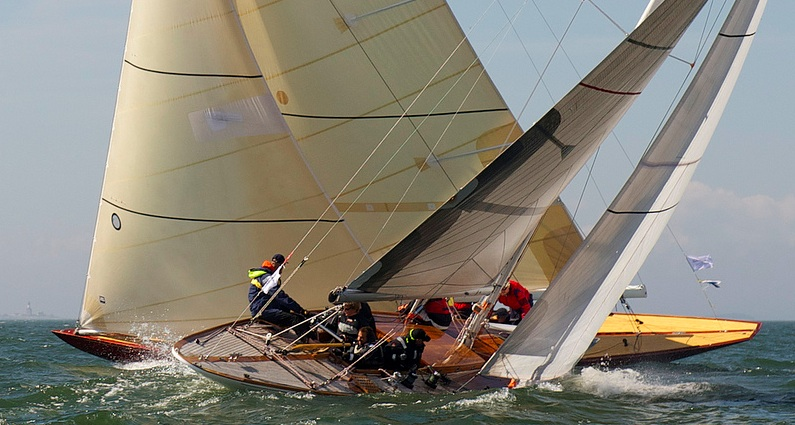
The Finnish eights Sphinx (FIN–4) and Sagitta (FIN–2) competing in 2012.

The International Rule was set up in 1907 to replace earlier, simpler handicap system which were often local or at best, national, and often also fairly simple, producing extreme boats which were fast but lightly constructed and impractical. The Eight Metre class was the medium size rating established under the rule and they were chosen as an Olympic class in 1908 Summer Olympics. The Eights remained in the Olympics until 1936.

Up till 1914 the 8 metre yachts were traditionally Gaff rig. This changed with the launch of Ierne by the Fife yard becoming the first yacht of the class using Bermuda rig. Over time Bermuda rigs became more popular thanks to much more convenient cruising.

New, modern eights are still built utilising newest contemporary technologies, at the rate of 1–3 boats per year. During the 1980s, many old sailboat classes experienced a revival of interest. The class has undergone a renaissance which has continued to the day, with many old yachts restored or rebuilt to racing condition, and 8mr competition is once again thriving with 25–35 boats participating annually at the 8mR Worlds. "The International Eight Register" includes 177 identified existing boats of a total of approximately 500 boats built from 1907 until today.

== Olympics ==
Event	Gold	Silver	Bronze
1908 London	Great Britain (GBR); Blair Cochrane; Charles Campbell; John Rhodes; Henry Sutton; Arthur Wood	Sweden (SWE); Carl Hellström; Edmund Thormählen; Eric Sandberg; Erik Wallerius; Harald Wallin; The Duchess of Westminster	Great Britain (GBR); Philip Hunloke; Alfred Hughes; Frederick Hughes; George Ratsey; William Ward
1912 Stockholm	Norway (NOR); Thoralf Glad; Thomas Aas; Andreas Brecke; Torleiv Corneliussen; Christian Jebe	Sweden (SWE); Bengt Heyman; Emil Henriques; Alvar Thiel; Herbert Westermark; Nils Westermark	Finland (FIN); Bertil Tallberg; Arthur Ahnger; Emil Lindh; Gunnar Tallberg; Georg Westling
1920 Antwerp; 1907 rule	Norway (NOR); Carl Ringvold; Thorleif Holbye; Alf Jacobsen; Kristoffer Olsen; Tellef Wagle	No further competitors	No further competitors
1920 Antwerp; 1919 rule	Norway (NOR); Magnus Konow; Thorleif Christoffersen; Reidar Marthiniussen; Ragnar Vik	Norway (NOR); Jens Salvesen; Finn Schiander; Lauritz Schmidt; Nils Thomas; Ralph Tschudi	Belgium (BEL); Albert Grisar; Willy de l'Arbre; Georges Hellebuyck; Léopold Standaert; Henri Weewauters
1924 Paris	Norway (NOR); Carl Ringvold; Rick Bockelie; Harald Hagen; Ingar Nielsen; Carl Ringvold, Jr.	Great Britain (GBR); Ernest Roney; Harold Fowler; Edwin Jacob; Thomas Riggs; Walter Riggs	France (FRA); Louis Breguet; Pierre Gauthier; Robert Girardet; André Guerrier; Georges Mollard
1928 Amsterdam	France (FRA); Donatien Bouché; André Derrien; Virginie Hériot; André Lesauvage; Jean Lesieur; Carl de la Sablière	Netherlands (NED); Johannes van Hoolwerff; Lambertus Doedes; Hendrik Kersken; Cornelis van Staveren; Gerard de Vries Lentsch; Maarten de Wit	Sweden (SWE); Clarence Hammar; Tore Holm; Carl Sandblom; John Sandblom; Philip Sandblom; Wilhelm Törsleff
1932 Los Angeles	United States (USA); Owen Churchill; John Biby; Alphonse Burnand; Kenneth Carey; William Cooper; Pierpont Davis; Carl Dorsey; John Huettner; Richard Moore; Alan Morgan; Robert Sutton; Thomas Webster	Canada (CAN); Ronald Maitland; Ernest Cribb; Peter Gordon; George Gyles; Harry Jones; Hubert Wallace	No further competitors
1936 Berlin	Italy (ITA); Giovanni Reggio; Bruno Bianchi; Luigi De Manincor; Domenico Mordini; Enrico Poggi; Luigi Poggi	Norway (NOR); Olaf Ditlev-Simonsen; John Ditlev-Simonsen; Hans Struksnæs; Lauritz Schmidt; Jacob Thams; Nordahl Wallem	Germany (GER); Hans Howaldt; Fritz Bischoff; Alfried Krupp von Bohlen und Halbach; Eduard Mohr; Felix Scheder-Bieschin; Otto Wachs

== World Championships ==
After a long break, the Worlds have been organised for the eight metres in four classes:

1. The World Cup.
2. The Sira Cup – All Classic eights built prior to 1968
3. The Neptune Trophy – All Classics with original deck plan build prior to 1970, wooden spars and Dacron sails
4. Vintage eights – Gaffs build before 1920.

=== Worlds Venue ===
Dates			Host			No. Boats	Sailors			Ref.
Ed.	Date	Year	Host club	Location	Nat.	No. Boats	No.	Nat.	Cont	Ref.
1	–	1970	Royal Northern and Clyde Yacht Club	Rhu, Argyll & Bute, Scotland	United Kingdom					
2	–	1975	Royal Swedish Yacht Club	Saltsjöbaden, Stockholm	Sweden					
3	–	1978	Nylandska Jaktklubben	Helsinki, Uusimaa	Finland					
4	–	1982	Gotlands Seglarförbund – Visby	Gotland	Sweden					
5	–	1983	Royal Norwegian Yacht Club	Oslo	Norway					
6	–	1984	Royal Canadian Yacht Club	Toronto, Ontario	Canada					
7	–	1985	Rochester Yacht Club	Rochester, Monroe County, New York	United States					
8	–	1986	Club Nautique de Cannes	Cannes, Alpes-Maritimes	France					
9	18–25 Jul	1987	Nylandska Jaktklubben	Helsinki, Uusimaa	Finland					
10	17–23 Jul	1988	Royal Swedish Yacht Club	Saltsjöbaden, Stockholm	Sweden					
11	–	1989	Royal Canadian Yacht Club	Toronto, Ontario	Canada					
12	–	1990	Rochester Yacht Club	Rochester, Monroe County, New York	United States					
13	–	1991	Port Credit Yacht Club	Mississauga	Canada					
14	–	1992	Royal Swedish Yacht Club	Saltsjöbaden, Stockholm	Sweden					
15	–	1993	Nylandska Jaktklubben	Helsinki, Uusimaa	Finland					
16	–	1994	Club Nautique de Cannes	Cannes, Alpes-Maritimes	France					
17	–	1995	Royal Yacht Club Hollandia	Medemblik	Netherlands					
18	–	1996	Sodus Bay Yacht Club	Sodus Point	United States					
19	–	1998	Société Nautique de Genève	Geneva	Switzerland					
20	15–21 Aug	1999	Rochester Yacht Club	Rochester, Monroe County, New York	United States					
21	9–16 Jun	2000	Yacht Club Italiano	Genoa	Italy					
22	20–27 Jul	2002	Nylandska Jaktklubben	Helsinki, Uusimaa	Finland					
23	14–21 Jun	2003	Societe Nautique de La Trinite-sur-Mer	La Trinité-sur-Mer, Morbihan	France	20				
24	–	2004	Société Nautique de Genève	Geneva	Switzerland	29				
25	13–20 Aug	2005	Royal Canadian Yacht Club	Toronto, Ontario	Canada	15				
26	4–14 Jul	2006	Lindauer Segles Club	Lindau, Lake Constance, Bavaria	Germany	21				
27	16–21 Jul	2007	Royal Northern and Clyde Yacht Club	Rhu, Argyll & Bute, Scotland	United Kingdom					
28	–	2008	Royal Norwegian Yacht Club	Oslo	Norway	23				
29	30Sep −3Oct	2009	Yacht Club de Hyeres	Hyères, Var	France	15				
30	21–28 Aug	2010	Royal Canadian Yacht Club	Toronto, Ontario	Canada	15				
31	29Jun −3Jul	2011	Flensburger Segel Club	Glücksburg	Germany	25				
32	15–22 Jul	2012	Royal Yacht Squadron	Cowes, Isle of Wight	United Kingdom	22				
33	29Jul −3Aug	2013	Helsingfors Segelsällskap	Helsinki	Finland	27				
34	5–12 Sep	2014	Societe Nautique de La Trinite-sur-Mer	La Trinité-sur-Mer, Morbihan	France	26				
35	6–12 Jul	2015	Société Nautique de Genève	Geneva	Switzerland					
36	19–27 Aug	2016	Royal Canadian Yacht Club	Toronto, Ontario	Canada					
37	10–19 Aug	2017	Hankø Yacht Club	Hankø, Østfold	Norway	28				
38	2–7 Jul	2018	Yacht Club Langenargen	Langenargen	Germany					
39	20–27 Jul	2019	Royal Yacht Squadron	Cowes, Isle of Wight	United Kingdom					
N/A	15–22 Aug	2020	Royal Dutch Sailing and Rowing Association, Buyshaven	Buyshaven	Netherlands	(CANCELLED COVID)				
N/A	29Aug −4Sep	2021		Enkhuizen	Netherlands	(CANCELLED COVID)				
40	25–31 Jul	2022	Société Nautique de Genève	Geneva	Switzerland	24				
41	28Aug −2Sep	2023	Yacht Club Italiano	Genoa	Italy	19				
42	17–24 Aug	2024	Royal Northern and Clyde Yacht Club	Rhu, Argyll & Bute, Scotland	United Kingdom	13				
43	2–9 Aug	2025	Airisto Segelsällskap	Turku	Finland	21	155	10	2	

=== Worlds Results ===
Year	Gold	Silver	Bronze	1st
1970	Silja; John Archibald (GBR)			
1975	Silja; Krister Ahlstrom (FIN)			
1978	Iskareen; Per Wermelin (SWE)			
1982	Iroquois; Eugene Van Voorhis (USA)			
1983	Iroquois; Eugene Van Voorhis (USA)			Vision; Design – C.E. Nicholson (1930); Robin Clarke (CAN)
1984	Octavia; Robin Clarke (CAN)			Vision; Design – C.E. Nicholson (1930); Robin Clarke (CAN)
1985	Golden Feather; Harry Voss (USA)			Vision; Design – C.E. Nicholson (1930); Robin Clarke (CAN)
1986 France	Gitana Sixty; Philippe Durr (25x17px)			Ayana; Design – F. Camatte 1947; Walter Latscha
1987	Spirit; Per Wermelin (SWE)			Wye; Design – C.E. Nicholson 1935; Sigfrid Svensson
1988	Gefion; Sigge Svensson (SWE)			Wanda; Design – Tore Holm (1937); Lasse Björk
1989	Gefion; Sigge Svensson (SWE)			Venture II; Design – E.A. Shuman (1938); Lorne Corley
1990	Gefion; Bryan Gooderham (SWE)			Venture II; Design – E.A. Shuman (1938); Lorne Corley
1991	Gefion; Brian Gooderham (SWE)			Venture II; Design – E.A. Shuman (1938); Lorne Corley
1992	Spirit; Per Wermelin (SWE)			Isabel; Gustav Estlander 1928; Bo Persson
1993	Sarissa; Ron Palm (USA)			
1994	Gefion; Sigge Svensson (SWE)			Vision; Design – C.E. Nicholsen (1930); Eric Mallet
1995	Natural; Hank Stuart (USA)			Vision; Design – C.E. Nicholsen (1930); Eric Mallet
1996	Sarissa; Ron Palm (USA)			Iskareen; Olin Stephens (1939); Ralph Reimann
1998	Yquem; Jean Marc Monnard (SUI)			Vision; Design – C.E. Nicholsen (1930); Eric Mallet
1999	Golden Feather; Eric Voss (USA)			Norseman; Design – William J. Roue (1930); Cedric G. E. Gyles
2000	Gefion; Pierre-André Bonjour (SUI)			Vision; Design – C.E. Nicholson (1930); Eric Mallet
2002	FRA 29 – Fleur de Lys; 2002 – Jacques Fauroux Jacques Fauroux (FRA); Dominique Caparros (FRA); Yves Despres (FRA); Jean Luc Durosne (FRA); Nicolas Fauroux (FRA); Bruno Fauroux (FRA)			I16 – Bona; Design – Baglietto (1934); Dr. Giovanni Mogna (ITA)
2003	FRA 29 – Fleur de Lys; 2002 – Jacques Fauroux Jacques Fauroux (FRA); Dominique Caparros (FRA); Yves Despres (FRA); Jean Luc Durosne (FRA); Nicolas Fauroux (FRA); Bruno Fauroux (FRA)	SUI-8 Yquem; 1985 – Pelle Petterson & 2003 Van Oosanen Wing keel Manuel Stern (SUI); Jean Fabre (SUI)	GBR-2 Lafayette; 1986 – Jacques Fauroux Philip Crebbin (GBR); Jos Fruytier (NED)	I16 – Bona; Design – Baglietto (1934) Dr. Giovanni Mogna (ITA)
2004	NED-2 Lafayette Philip Crebbin (GBR); Ruud Van Hilst (NED); Jos Fruytier (NED); Jeroen Jonk (NED); Tim Van Rootselaar (NED); John Lammerts Van Bueren (NED); Hugh Beaton (CAN)	FRA 29 – Fleur de Lys; 2002 – Jacques Fauroux Jacques Fauroux (FRA); Manual Stern (FRA)	Lafayette GBR-2; 1986 – Jacques Fauroux GBR (25x17px); NED (25x17px)	Cutty Tou; 1930 – C.E. Nicholson Alain & Gilles Minos
2005	NED 1 Hollandia; 2005 Ian Howlett Philip Crebbin (GBR); Ruud Van Hilst (NED); Jos Fruytier (NED); Jeroen Jonk (NED); Tim Van Rootselaar (NED); John Lammerts Van Bueren (NED); Hugh Beaton (CAN)			Iskareen; Olin Stephens (1939); Ralph Reimann
2006	SUI-10 Sarissa; Peter Groh (SUI)	SUI-11 Aluette; Ernst Bieri (SUI)	NED 1 Hollandia; 2005 Ian Howlett; Tim Van Rootselaar (NED)	Z-9Froya; 1939 Bjarne Aas
2007	SUI 11 Aluette			Saskia; William Fife III 1931; John & Micheal Stephen
2008	SUI 11 Aluette	SUI 2 YQUEM II	GBR-2 Lafayette	N-33 – Sira; Johan Anker 1938; His Majesty Harald V of Norway
2009	GBR-2 – Lafayette Allan Manuel (GBR); Stevens Rarity (GBR); Matt Whittaker (GBR); Billy Russell (GBR); Paul Johnston (GBR); David Kelly (GBR)	SUI 11 Aluette	NED 1 Hollandia; 2005 Ian Howlett	Severn; Design – William Fife 1936; Brad Butterworth (NZL); Murray Jones (NZL); Simon Daubney (NZL); Warwick Fleury (NZL); Peter Evans (NZL); Dean Phipps (NZL); Will McCarthy (NZL)
2010	SUI 11 – Aluette; Helm – Torsten Müller (SUI); Stefan Schneider (GER); Markus Olbrecht (SUI); Christian Gasser (SUI); Ernst Bieri (SUI); Günther Reisacher (SUI); Iris Metten (SUI)			CAN 25 – Raven; Alfred Mylne & Sir Thomas Glen-Coats 1938; Mark DeCelles (CAN); Richard Self (CAN)
2011	NED 1 – Hollandia; Helm – Tim Van Rootselaar (NED); Ruud Van Hilst (NED); Jeroen Jonk (NED); John Lammerts Van Bueren (NED); John Cutler (NZL); Sandro Benigni (ITA); Jos Fruytier (25x17px)			CAN 25 – Raven; Alfred Mylne & Sir Thomas Glen-Coats 1938; Mark DeCelles (CAN); Richard Self (CAN)
2012	Tim Van Rootselaar (NED) Ruud Van Hilst (NED); Jeroen Jonk (NED); John Lammerts Van Bueren (NED); Giles Nelis (NED); Dan Slater (NZL); Jos Fruytier (NED)	YQUEM II SUI-2; Jean Fabre (SUI)	Lafayette GBR-2; Murdoch Mckillop (GBR)	4th – CAN 25 – Raven; Alfred Mylne & Sir Thomas Glen-Coats 1938; Mark DeCelles (CAN); Richard Self (CAN)
2013	NED 1 – Hollandia; Tim Van Rootselaar (NED); Ruud Van Hilst (NED); Jeroen Jonk (NED); John Lammerts Van Bueren (NED); Giles Nelis (NED); Dan Slater (NZL)	SUI-2 YQUEM II	JUANITA	5th / CAN 25 Raven; 1938 Alfred Mylne & Sir Thomas Glen-Coats; Mark DeCelles (CAN); Richard Self (CAN)
2014	NED 1 – Hollandia; Design – Ian Howlett (2005) Helm – Tim Van Rootselaar (NED); Ruud Van Hilst (NED); Jeroen Jonk (NED); John Lammerts Van Bueren (NED); Giles Nelis (BEL); Sandro Benigni (ITA)	YQUEM II	JUANITA	5th / CAN 25 – Raven; Design – Alfred Mylne & Sir Thomas Glen-Coats 1938; Mark DeCelles (CAN); Richard Self (CAN)
2015	– Yquem II Helm – Jean Fabre (SUI); Manuel Stern (SUI); Cédric Senften (SUI); Jean-Marc Monnard (SUI); David Genier (SUI); Marc Stern (SUI)			Wyvern; Starling Burgess / A&R; Rüdiger Stihl
2016	NED 1 – Hollandia; Design – Ian Howlett (2005) Helm – Tim Van Rootselaar (NED); Ruud Van Hilst (NED); Jeroen Jonk (NED); Giles Nelis (NED); Tijmen Van Rootselaar (NED); Dan Slater (NZL)			Bangalore; Design - Shannon Howard; Bart Meuring
2017	GBR 007 – Miss U (2014) Helm – Avia Willment (GBR); Neil Harrison (GBR); Richard Burlingham (GBR); Ian Smyth (GBR); James Hemingway (GBR); Marcel Herrera (UAE)			Pandora (ex. Raven); Werner Deuring; Alfred Mylne & Sir Thomas Glen-Coats 1938
2018	Conquistador (2005); Helm – Werner Deuring (AUT); Markus Sagmeister (GER); Michael Seifarth (GER); Reinhard Brucker (GER); Thomas Schäffler (GER); Dan Slater (NZL)			Luna; Design – C.E. Nicholson (2011); Harri Roschier
2019	SUI 2 – Yquem II (2002) Helm – Jean Fabre (SUI) Manuel Stern (SUI); Cédric Senften (SUI); David Genier (SUI); Marc Stern (SUI); Pascal Python (SUI)			
2022	SUI 2 – Yquem II (2002) Helm – Jean Fabre (SUI); Manuel Stern (SUI); Cédric Senften (SUI); David Genier (SUI); Marc Stern (SUI); Pascal Python (SUI)	GER 16 Starling Burgess	K 35 Pandora	
2023	SUI 2 – Yquem II (2002); Helm – Jean Fabre (SUI); Manuel Stern (SUI); Cédric Senften (SUI); David Genier (SUI); Marc Stern (SUI); Pascal Python (SUI)	AUT-277 Conquistador; Werner Deuring (AUT)	ITA-16 Bona; Vera Mogna (ITA)	GER-16 Starling Burgess; Selina Stihl (GER)
2024	SUI 2 – Yquem II (2002) Helm – Jean Fabre (SUI)	SUI-8 Spirit	KC-3 Vision	
2025	SUI 2 – Yquem II (2002) Helm – Jean Fabre (SUI); David Genier (SUI); Manuel Stern (SUI); Cedric Senften (SUI); Marc Stern (SUI); Alec Ardin (SUI); Jean Fabre Jnr. (SUI)	GER 16 – Starling Burgess Eckhard Kaller (GER); Seba Reischl (GER); Heiko Buhmann (GER); Eberhard Magg (GER); Andreas Löwe (GER); Selina Stihl (GER); Lars Kaller (GER)	K 35 – Pandora Werner Deuring (AUT); Alexander Deuring (AUT); Markus Sagmeister (AUT); Michael Sagmeister (AUT); Lukas Rhode (AUT); Hugh Beaton (CAN); Jesse Kairama (FIN)	GER 16 – Starling Burgess Eckhard Kaller (GER); Seba Reischl (GER); Heiko Buhmann (GER); Eberhard Magg (GER); Andreas Löwe (GER); Selina Stihl (GER); Lars Kaller (GER)
