= Sport in Scotland =

Sporting activity in Scotland

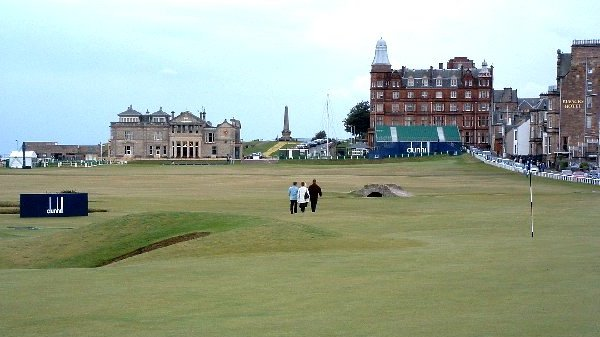
The Old Course at St Andrews

Sport plays a central role in Scottish culture. The temperate, oceanic climate has played a key part in the evolution of sport in Scotland, with all-weather sports like football, rugby union, rugby league and golf dominating the national sporting consciousness. However, many other sports are played in the country, with popularity varying between sports and between regions.

Scotland has its own sporting competitions and governing bodies, such as the Camanachd Association, the Scottish Rugby Union, Scottish Rugby League. The country has independent representation at many international sporting events, for example the Rugby League World Cup, as well as the Commonwealth Games (although not the Olympic Games).

Scots, and Scottish immigrants, have made several key contributions to the history of sport, with important innovations and developments in: golf, curling, football, rugby union (the invention of rugby sevens, first international, and first league system), Highland games (which have contributed to the evolution of modern athletics events), shinty (the predecessor of both ice hockey and bandy), cycling (Kirkpatrick Macmillan invented the pedal bicycle), and water polo (first set of rules, games and internationals).

Highland games, the largest and most widespread multi-sport festivals of the 19th century, are claimed to have influenced Baron Pierre de Coubertin and Dr William Milligan Sloane (a scholar of French History and close friend of Baron de Courbertin) of Princeton when he was planning the revival of the Olympic Games. De Coubertin and Milligan, who was researching his book on Napoleon at the time, saw a display of Highland games at the Paris Exhibition of 1889.

== Football codes ==
Ever since the 19th century, the two main football codes in Scotland are association football (which is more commonly referred to as just "football" or "fitba") and rugby union, though the former being significantly dominant since World War II. Some others are also played. For Gaelic football, please see under Gaelic Athletic Association, further down.

=== Traditional football ===
There is a long tradition of football games stretching back centuries. While these games were referred to as "football" (and numerous variants), many of them were very different from modern football, and involved carrying the ball. One of these games was outlawed in 1424. The history of football in Scotland includes various traditional ball games, for example the Ba game; some of these early games probably involved the kicking of a ball. Uncertainty about the specific nature of these games is because prior to 1863, the term "football" implied almost any ball game that was played on ones feet and not played on horseback. Some of these local games were probably played as far back as the Middle Ages, although the earliest contemporary accounts (as opposed to decrees simply banning "football") come in the eighteenth century. Many of these accounts refer to the violence of traditional Scottish football and as a result many games were abolished or modified. Several burghs retain an annual Ba game, with the Kirkwall Ba Game in Orkney being probably the most famous form of traditional football in Scotland. Elsewhere in Scotland, the greatest evidence for a tradition of football games comes from southern Scotland, in particular the Scottish Borders.

=== Association football ===
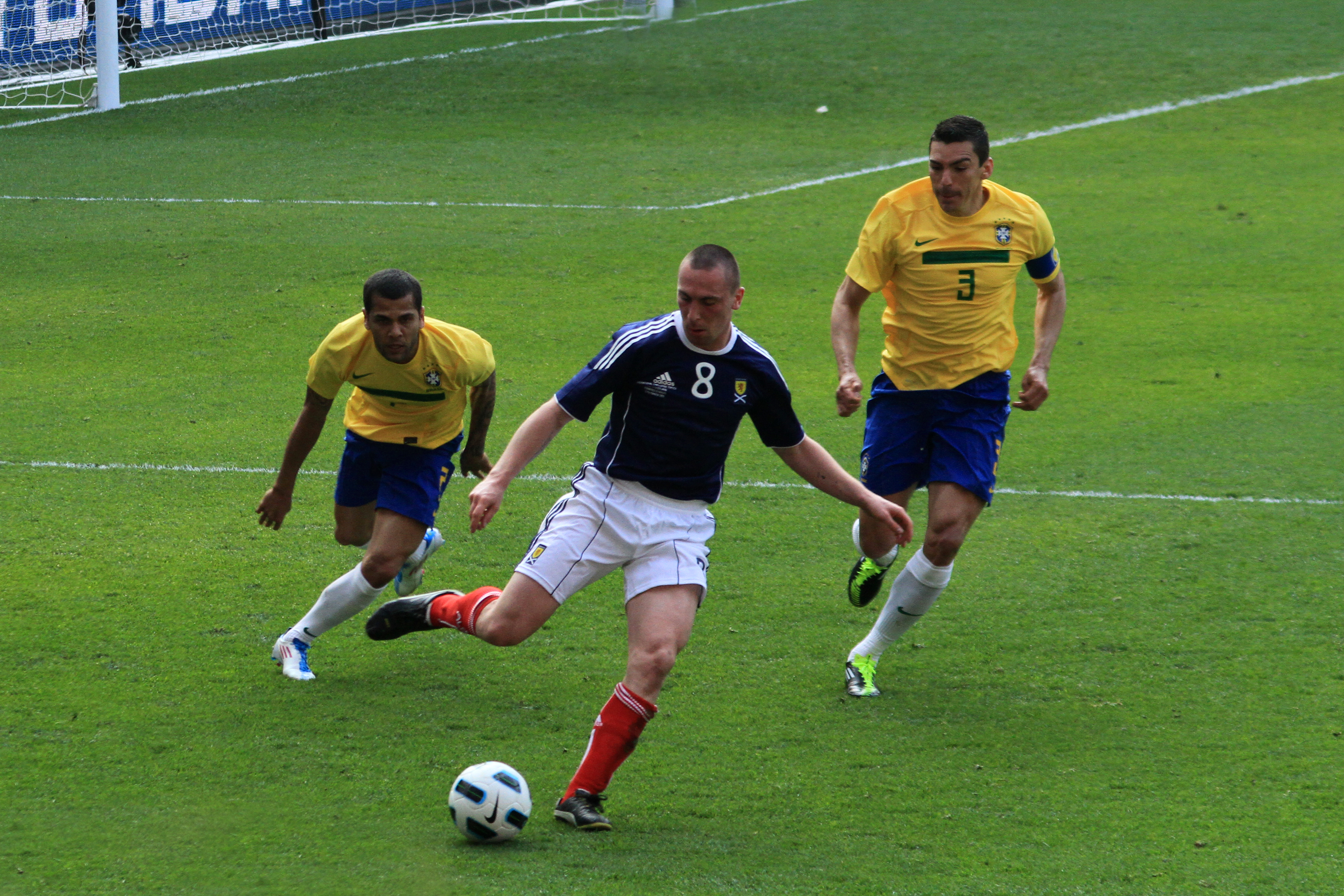
Scott Brown with the Scotland national football team against Brazil, 2011

The world's first official international association football match was held in 1872 and was the idea of C. W. Alcock of the Football Association, which was seeking to promote association football in Scotland. The match took place at the West of Scotland Cricket Club's Hamilton Crescent ground in the Partick area of Glasgow. The match was between Scotland and England and resulted in a 0–0 draw. Following this, association football became the most popular sport in Scotland. The Scottish Cup is the world's oldest national trophy, first contested in 1873 (although the FA Cup is an older competition, its original trophy is no longer in existence). Queen's Park F.C., in Glasgow, is probably the oldest association football club in the world outside England.

The Scottish Football Association (SFA), the second-oldest national football association in the world, is the main governing body for Scottish association football, and a founding member of the International Football Association Board (IFAB) which governs the Laws of the Game. As a result of this key role in the development of the sport, Scotland is one of only four countries to have a permanent representative on the IFAB; the other four representatives are appointed for set periods by FIFA. The country has hosted several international football competitions, including the 1989 FIFA U-16 World Championship, the 1998 UEFA European Under-16 Championship and UEFA Euro 2020, and is scheduled to host the upcoming UEFA Euro 2028 and the 2035 FIFA Women's World Cup competitions.

The SFA is also responsible for the Scotland national football team. The national stadium is Hampden Park in the Mount Florida area of Glasgow. Supporters of the national team are nicknamed the Tartan Army and are well-regarded for their friendliness, receiving particular acclaim at Euro 2024 in Germany. As of January 2026, Scotland's men's team are ranked as the 38th best national football team in the FIFA World Rankings. Their highest ranking was 14th in 2007, and lowest was 86th in 2004. The national team last attended the World Cup in France in 1998, but finished last in their group stage after defeats to eventual runners-up Brazil and Morocco. They won a single point after a 1-1 draw with Norway. After a barren spell of 23 years without attending a major tournament since 1998, Scotland qualified for successive European Championships in 2020 and 2024 and the 2026 FIFA World Cup under Steve Clarke; sealing the latter in a famous 4-2 win against Denmark.

Elite club association football in Scotland is represented by the Scottish Professional Football League (SPFL). The Scottish Premiership was named by UEFA in 2024 as the best-supported league per capita in Europe, with 18.36 per 1,000 people attending games in the 2023/24 season. The most successful clubs in Scotland by far are Rangers and Celtic, collectively known as the Old Firm; since the 1984-85 season, no other club has won the Scottish Premiership title aside from them. They are also by far the best-supported clubs in Scotland, poessessing two of the largest football stadiums in the country with 51,700 (Ibrox) and 60,411 (Celtic Park). With 120 trophies to their name as of May 2025, Celtic are currently the second most successful team in professional football, behind Al Ahly of Egypt. Other successful clubs in Scotland include Aberdeen (the last non-Old Firm winners of the top flight), Heart of Midlothian, Hibernian and Dundee United.

Scotland's association football clubs have had a fairly high degree of success internationally. In terms of European competitions, Rangers, Celtic and Aberdeen have all won a major honour. Rangers were the first team from Britain to reach a European Final, the 1961 European Cup Winners Cup; they later won this honour in 1972. Aberdeen, under the management of Alex Ferguson, famously beat Real Madrid to win the 1983 edition. However, Celtic are the only Scottish team to have won Europe's premier competition, the Champions League (then known as the European Cup), doing so in 1967 and also becoming the first winners from Britain. Their victory is particularly historic as the competition was won by a team comprising no players born more than thirty miles (48 km) from the home of the club, Celtic Park.

=== Rugby union ===
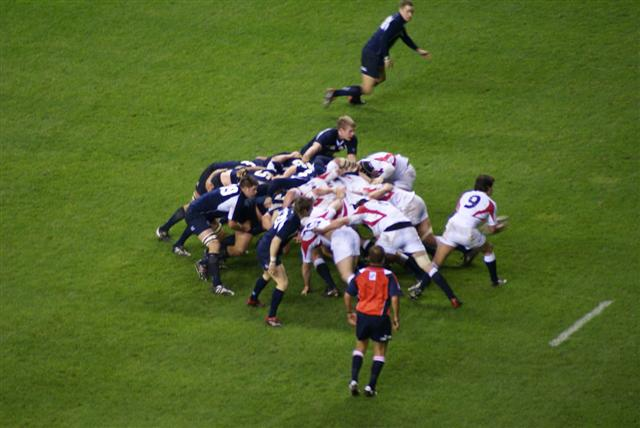
Scotland compete for the Calcutta Cup annually at the Six Nations Championship.

The world's oldest regular rugby fixture was first played in 1858 between Merchiston Castle School and the former pupils of Edinburgh Academy. Edinburgh Academy was also involved in the first-ever international rugby union game, when a side representing England met the Scottish national side on the cricket field of the academy at Raeburn Place, Edinburgh on 27 March 1871, which Scotland won.

The Scottish Football Union (SFU) was founded in 1873 and is a founding member of the International Rugby Board (now World Rugby), joining in 1886 with Ireland and Wales, England joining in 1890. In 1924, the SFU changed its name to become the modern-day Scottish Rugby Union (SRU), who now administer rugby union in Scotland. Scotland was the host nation for the 1973 International Seven-a-side Tournament, the 1993 Rugby World Cup Sevens competition, as well as the 1991 Rugby World Cup. Whilst the country was not the official host nation, it hosted some matches during the 1999 and 2007 Rugby World Cup competition respectively.

Murrayfield Stadium in Edinburgh is the home of the Scotland national rugby union team. As of March 2025, Scotland rank 7th in the World Rugby Rankings, their peak position being 5th in 2018 and 2023. The senior team annually takes part in the Six Nations and has participated in every iteration of the Rugby World Cup, taking place every four years. Scottish players are also eligible for selection for the British and Irish Lions, a composite team that tours the Southern Hemisphere, also taking place every four years. Scotland's Six Nations fixtures at Murrayfield are regularly sold out.

Scotland has two professional sides that compete in the United Rugby Championship and the European Professional Club Rugby tournaments: Edinburgh Rugby and Glasgow Warriors. Two other professional sides also formerly existed: Caledonia Reds and the Border Reivers, these sides folded due to funding issues within the SRU. The Scottish League Championship exists for amateur and semi-pro clubs.

Rugby union is most popular in the Scottish Borders; Melrose annually hosts its own rugby sevens tournament to which teams from around the world are invited. Despite football being by far the most popular sport in the country, it is a growing sport with 49,265 registered players and over 200 clubs as of 2020.

==== Rugby sevens ====
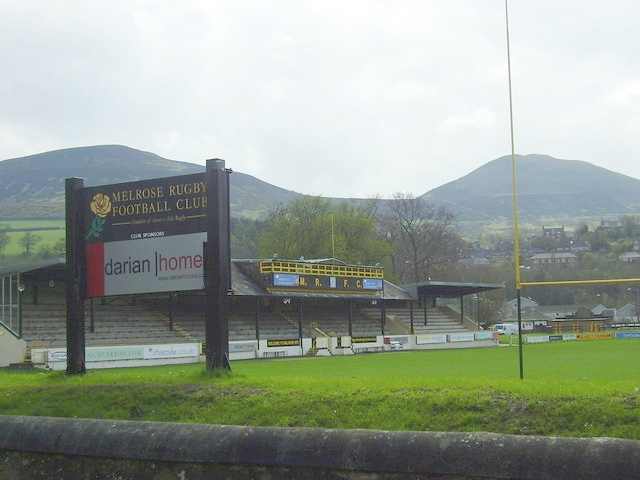
Nestling beneath the shadow of the Eildon Hills, the Greenyards at Melrose in Scotland is the original home of rugby sevens.

Rugby sevens is a variant of rugby union, initially conceived by Ned Haig, a butcher from Melrose, Roxburghshire, as a fundraising event for his local club Melrose RFC in 1883. The earliest recorded sevens match was played at the Greenyards, where it was well-received. The first official international sevens tournament occurred at Murrayfield as part of the "Scottish Rugby Union's celebration of rugby" centenary celebrations in 1973. Due to the success of the format, the ongoing Hong Kong Sevens was launched three years later, and numerous other international competitions followed. In 1993, the Rugby World Cup Sevens, in which the Melrose Cup is contested, was launched, which is named after its town of origin. In the meantime, the annual Melrose Sevens tournament continues in popularity and there is a healthy Borders Sevens Circuit. The annual IRB Sevens World Series, featuring international sides from around the world, used to feature the Edinburgh Sevens at Murrayfield, but that tournament has since been replaced by the Paris Sevens.

=== Rugby league ===
Rugby league is administered by Scotland Rugby League. The main international team has been playing since 1909 although their first proper international wasn't until 1996 when they beat Ireland in Dublin 6–26. In the 2000 Rugby League World Cup, Scotland finished last in their group, although only narrowly lost to Ireland, Samoa and New Zealand. The latter two matches were played in Edinburgh and Glasgow respectively. A major boost to rugby league in Scotland came when the Rugby League Challenge Cup Final was brought to Murrayfield, Edinburgh. On both occasions over 60,000 watched the final. This was coupled with a fantastic 42–20 win over France in July 2001, possibly one of Scotland's best wins in their short history.

Scotland finished top of Group C in the 2013 Rugby League World Cup progressing ahead of Tonga and Italy but losing to New Zealand 40–4. In the 2016 Rugby League Four Nations Scotland came away with a historic draw 18–18 with New Zealand in Workington, Cumbria although finishing last in the tournament.

The top tier of the domestic game in Scotland is the semi-professional Scottish National League currently features teams including the Aberdeen Warriors, Easterhouse Panthers, Edinburgh Eagles and the Strathmore Silverbacks.

=== American football ===
American football is played on an amateur basis throughout Scotland. There are 14 under 18 teams ranging from Inverness Blitz in the North, Inverclyde Hawks in the West through to Edinburgh in the East.

7 teams currently play in the BAFA Community Leagues with Glasgow Tigers, Clyde Valley Blackhawks, Dundee Hurricanes, Highland Wildcats, Edinburgh Wolves and West Coast Trojans playing in Division 2, and the East Kilbride Pirates playing in Division 1.

A professional team, the Scottish Claymores, played in NFL Europe between 1995 and 2004, based in Edinburgh and Glasgow. Lawrence Tynes, Joe Andruzzi and Dante Hall all played for the team and went on to have success in the NFL.

=== Australian rules football ===
Australian rules football is a minor sport in Scotland.

There are currently three teams in SARFL, most established in the early 2000s. It has seen growth around the major cities and now has a national team.

=== Futsal, indoor football and five-a-side ===
Futsal is a Brazilian form of football, similar to, but not the same as indoor football, which is more closely related to standard football.

Five-a-side (not to be confused with fives) is popular in Scotland, with many casual leagues.

== Stick and bat games ==
For hurling and camogie, please see under Gaelic Athletic Association.

=== Cricket ===
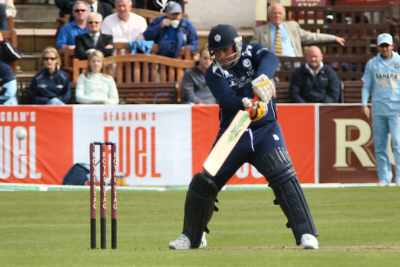
Ryan Watson batting against India

Cricket has a much lower profile in Scotland than it has south of the border in England. Scotland is not one of the twelve leading cricketing nations which play Test matches, but the Scottish national team is now allowed to play full One Day Internationals, and takes part in the Cricket World Cup, in which Scotland reached the final tournament in 2007. Scotland has a well established recreational cricket structure. Scotland has co-hosted the 1999 Cricket World Cup along with England, Ireland and Netherlands.

The governing body for Scottish cricket is Cricket Scotland, which administers women's cricket and junior cricket as well as the men's game.

Cricket has an image as an "English" sport in Scotland, with many top players competing for the England national side, such as Jon Croft, and indeed, the national side competes in the English counties system.

Freuchie Cricket Club in Fife famously won the Village Championship in the 1985.

It is widely played in Scottish private schools, and has some presence in the major cities. Moreover, Scotland defeated England for the first time in 2018. They still remain unbeaten by Bangladesh, a full member nation in cricket, in T20I. They also participated in the 2015 ICC World Cup.

=== Golf ===
Scotland is the "home of golf", and is well known for its many links courses, including the Old Course at St Andrews, Carnoustie, Muirfield and Royal Troon. The first record of golf being played was at Leith Links in 1457.

Scotland is at the forefront of international golf, with some of the world's premier courses being located there. The most famous courses, such as St Andrews tend to be on the east coast's dunelands, which are known in Lowland Scots as "links" – this word has passed over into golf terminology as meaning a course. There are also major courses at Gleneagles, Ayrshire, East Lothian and Loch Lomond.

While there is considerable disagreement as to where in Scotland golf was invented – St Andrews, Leith or Bruntsfield – or even if it was invented within Scotland – both the Netherlands and China have staked claims – the modern game was codified in Scotland. Much of golf terminology has its roots in Lowland Scots, e.g. caddy, links, tee etc.

=== Shinty ===
Women's shinty

Shinty or camanachd is the traditional game of the Scottish Highlands, although historically it has a wider range. It is still played widely across the area today, with clubs also based in Glasgow, Edinburgh, Aberdeen, Fife and Perth, and in most universities. Its governing body is the Camanachd Association (in Scottish Gaelic, Comunn na Camanachd) who are based in Inverness.

The sport's premier prize is the Scottish Cup, more popularly known as the Camanachd Cup. Shinty also has the honour of having provided, according to the Guinness Book of Records, the world's most successful sporting team, Kingussie Camanachd. Shinty was formerly played through the Winter but has recently become a primarily Summer game. It has common roots with the Irish sport of Hurling.

=== Baseball ===
Baseball has existed in Edinburgh since the 1930s when it was played at US air bases at Kirknewton and East Fortune. In 2007 the Scottish National League was formed after previously being associated with British Baseball Federation. The league consisted of the Edinburgh Diamond Devils, Edinburgh Eagles, Strathclyde Falcons and the Glasgow Baseball Association. In 2011 the league was still going strong with the Edinburgh Diamond Devils, Edinburgh Cannons, Edinburgh Giants, and the Glasgow Baseball Association. In 2018 the first Postseason was established in line with the traditions of the game - The Caledonia Classic. In 2022 the Scottish National League split into two divisions. The lower, Single A, and the higher, AAA. There have been 8 Scottish baseball players to play in the Major leagues, and in 2023 a player who played in Edinburgh at ages 13 – 15 was drafted to the Philadelphia Phillies organisation in MLB. Baseball is still a minority sport in Scotland and is only played at an amateur level but is growing year on year.

=== Croquet ===
The Scottish Croquet Association, formed in 1974, has responsibility for croquet in Scotland.

Notable Scottish croquet players include Compton Mackenzie.

=== Elephant polo ===
Elephant polo is not played in Scotland, but gained notoriety within Scotland when The Duke of Argyll's team representing Scotland won the 2001, 2004 and 2005 Elephant Polo World Championships.

=== Field hockey ===
Field hockey is mainly played in the Lowlands, where it displaced shinty. Field hockey in Scotland is run by the Scottish Hockey Union.

=== Ice hockey ===
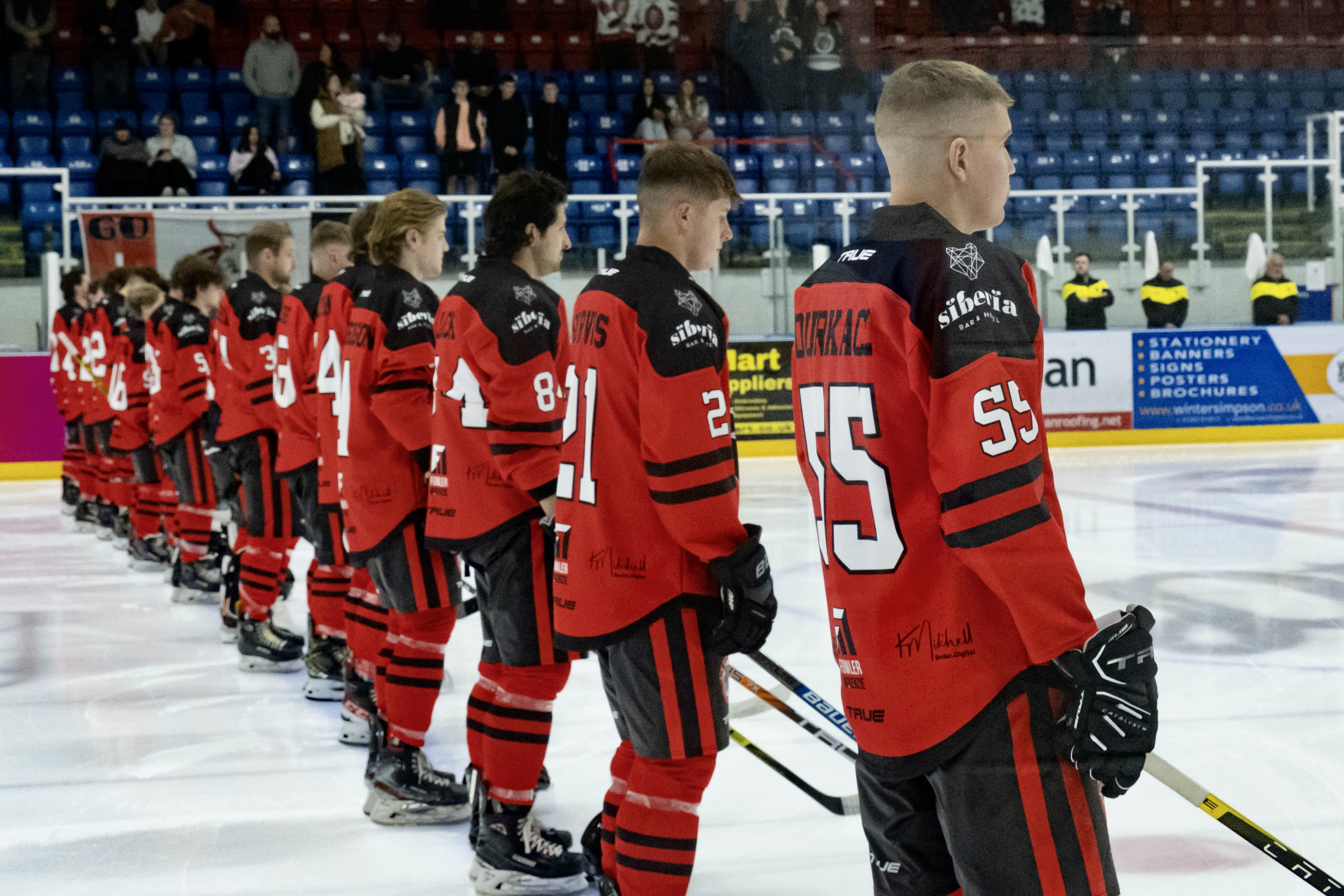
Aberdeen Lynx ice hockey team

Scotland has a very long successful history of ice hockey, and it is the third most attended team sport in the country after association football and rugby union. Scotland are host to the oldest ice hockey team in Britain which are the Fife Flyers. At the moment there are three Scottish teams competing in the UK-wide Elite Ice Hockey League (EIHL). In 2010 the Dundee Stars and the newly formed Braehead Clan (Now Glasgow Clan) joined the EIHL, in 2011 they were joined by the Fife Flyers, who were admitted as both their previous league and the Newcastle Vipers went bust creating an opening. Scotland has produced 3 of the top British Players of all time in Colin Shields.

Eight professional Scottish and one English ice hockey team compete in the Scottish National League.

Scottish Tony Hand is the first ice hockey player booked for the NHL in Britain who got his puck lessons.

=== Lacrosse ===
Lacrosse has a minor presence, tending to be played by girls at private schools, although there have been some male university teams as well.

Field lacrosse is the main sport, but box lacrosse is also played. It is always at amateur level. However, lacrosse in Scotland goes back to 1890 at St Leonards School, Fife, where women's lacrosse had been introduced by Louisa Lumsden. Lumsden brought the game to Scotland after watching a men's lacrosse game between the Canghuwaya Indians and the Montreal Lacrosse Club. One of Lumsden's students, Rosabelle Sinclair, established the first women's lacrosse team in the United States was at the Bryn Mawr School in Baltimore, Maryland.

Scotland fields three national teams – men's, women's and an indoor side

=== Rock-It-Ball ===
Rock-It-Ball has a minor presence, tending to be played in the Central Belt but is spreading throughout Scotland. The Scottish team won the World Cup in 2007 and 2011.

Scotland is also leading the way in the individual version of the sport known as V2. The current World Champion is Scott MacMichael who plays his Rock-It-Ball with the Falkirk Cannons. He also is the only player to have won medals in the 2007 and 2011 team World Cup Victories. At Youth level Scotland has the top female player in World V2 in Meghan Plummer, who also plays her Rock-It-Ball with the Falkirk Cannons.

It is a relatively new sport, having been created in the 21st century.

== Basket codes ==
=== Basketball ===
Basketball itself was originally invented by James Naismith, a Canadian of recent Scottish family origins, when he was in the USA.

basketballscotland is the governing body of basketball in Scotland.

Until the late 50s, Scotland was one of Europe's main teams as it twice qualified for the EuroBasket. Since then, the team declined. Scotland had some success at the FIBA European Championship for Small Countries where it has five bronze medals most recently in 2014.

Scotland joined FIBA in 1947, however its affiliation ended on September 30, 2016 following the establishment of a Great Britain national team in 2006. Since then, the Scotland national team has only been able to compete internationally at the Commonwealth Games.

=== Netball ===
Netball is played mostly by girls from the age of ten to fifteen, and is popular in private schools.

== Cue sports ==
Cue sports are very popular in Scotland.

=== Pool ===
Pool tables are commonly found in Scottish pubs and social clubs.

=== Snooker ===
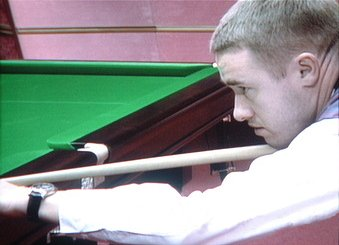
Stephen Hendry

Scotland has produced many great snooker players over the years, many of which have gone on to win the World Championship. Walter Donaldson was the first Scotsman to be crowned World Champion, winning in 1947 and again in 1950.

In the modern snooker era the most successful Scottish snooker player is Stephen Hendry. He has won the World Snooker Championship a record 7 times, winning it 5 years in a row from 1992 onwards and holds the record as being the youngest ever winner, beating Englishman Jimmy White 18 frames to 12 in 1990 aged just 21 years.

Between 1990 and 2012 Scottish players reached the final on 16 occasions, with Scots winning 12 Championships in that time. As well as Hendry's record 7 wins, John Higgins and Graeme Dott have also won the title.

In 1996, the Scotland Team of Stephen Hendry, John Higgins and Alan McManus won the Snooker World Cup.

== Racquet sports ==
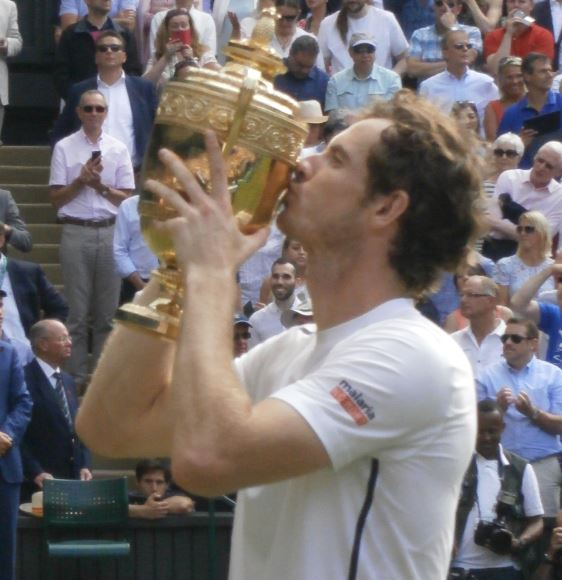
Andy Murray, two time Wimbledon winner (2013, 2016)

=== Badminton ===
BadmintonScotland is the national governing body for the sport of badminton in Scotland.

There are two major tournaments – the Scottish National Badminton Championships and the Scottish Open.

=== Racquets ===
There are several former racquets courts in Scotland: Eglinton Castle, Fyvie Castle, Kinloch Castle (Rùm). However, the game's popularity has dwindled.

=== Squash ===
Squash is played in most major urban centres.

A notable squash player is Peter Nicol. After initially representing Scotland in international squash, Nicol switched his representation to England in 2001, claiming that he felt he was not receiving sufficient support from Scottish Squash, the national governing body.

=== Tennis ===
Scotland competes as Great Britain in tennis, however its contribution to the pool of British players traditionally has been small in the modern era with almost all notable players being English. However, this has taken an about turn in recent years with emergence of Andy Murray, and doubles players Colin Fleming and Jamie Murray. Andy Murray is one of the best singles player currently representing Scotland as the previous UK number 1 and was also previously world number 1. On 7 July 2013 he became the first British player to win the men's singles at Wimbledon since Fred Perry in 1936, 77 years before. Brother Jamie and won the Wimbledon mixed doubles title along with Serbian Jelena Janković in 2007, the first time any British player had won a major title at Wimbledon in 20 years. Colin Fleming along with his English partner Ross Hutchins is currently ranked 9th in the ATP Doubles Team Rankings. There are no official ATP tournaments in Scotland however, with all major events in Britain being contested in England.

== Martial arts ==
A wide range of martial arts are practised in Scotland, but are usually administered at UK level.

=== Fencing ===
Scotland has produced Olympic fencers, many Commonwealth medallists and some very successful Paralympian and Commonwealth wheelchair fencers. There are nearly 50 Olympic-rules fencing clubs active, with 37 of them currently affiliated to Scottish Fencing, the Home Country Governing Body. The most commonly used weapon in Scottish fencing is the foil. Many of these clubs are classically focussed.

Scotland is at the forefront of the growth and development of the historic fencing movement with 16 historic fencing classes active, and many affiliated to the British Federation for Historical Swordplay. Many of these clubs are also classically focused.

=== Judo ===
Scots have been very prominent on the podium at the Judo events at the Commonwealth Games.

=== Karate ===
Karate in Scotland is mainly overseen by Karate Scotland, formerly known as the Scottish Karate Governing Body. This is the body affiliated with the World Karate Federation (WKF), who were the global body associated with Karate's inclusion at the 2020 Summer Olympics.

A number of other clubs are instead affiliated with the World Union of Karate Do Federations (WUKF).

== Track and field events ==
See also under Olympics and Commonwealth Games.

=== Athletics ===
Scottish Athletics is the governing body for athletics in Scotland. It replaced the Scottish Athletics Federation in April 2001.

=== Marathon ===
There are four marathons in Scotland: Edinburgh Marathon, Loch Ness Marathon, Lochaber Marathon and the Moray Marathon

== Angling ==
Scotland has long been popular with anglers, both coarse and fly fishers. Many of its major rivers such as the Spey and Tay have famous fishing beats. The Malloch Trophy is Scotland's premier award for salmon fishing. The award is given for the largest salmon caught – and safely returned to the water – on the fly in Scotland each year.

== Bowls ==
Lawn bowls is played in many parts of Scotland. Ten pin bowling arcades can be seen in a few places too. Much to the chagrin of bowling fans, bumpers are traditionally used in ten pin bowling.

== Boxing ==
Notable Scottish boxers include world champions Benny Lynch, Walter McGowan and Ken Buchanan; Lord David Douglas-Hamilton (who went on to become a Conservative politician)

== Canoeing ==
A number of Scottish rivers are popular with canoeists, including the River Spey. There is a national governing body, the Scottish Canoe Association.

== Climbing and mountaineering ==
Climbing is popular in some parts of Scotland. Notable climbers include Harold Raeburn.

== Cycling ==
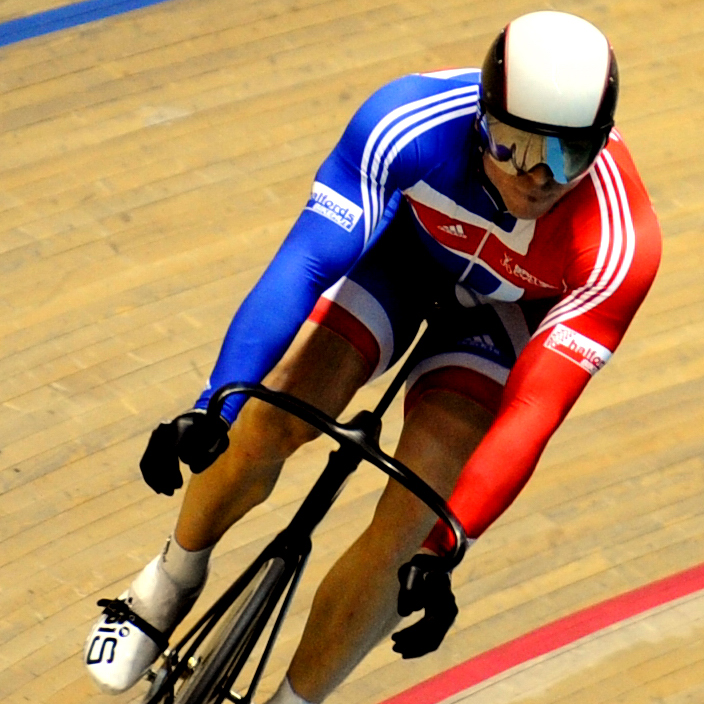
Cyclist Chris Hoy

Cycling is a popular amateur sport, with 99 clubs throughout the country, from the Shetland Wheelers to the Stewartry Wheelers. At the elite level, Scots have been more successful at track cycling rather than road racing, although Scotland has a long history of time-trialing on the road. The lack of road races within the country, with not a single UCI-ranked event, is largely to do with the refusal of Scottish local authorities to close public roads to allow road races to take place safely. Scotland has three velodromes, one at Meadowbank Stadium, in Edinburgh, another at Caird Park in Dundee and a third, the Sir Chris Hoy Velodrome, which was built in Glasgow for the 2014 Commonwealth Games. The governing body is the Scottish Cyclists' Union.

In recent years mountain biking has become very popular, with Scottish geography being ideal for training and racing. A World Cup event is regularly held in Fort William.

Scotland has produced several world-class cyclists. Robert Millar finished in 4th place at the 1984 Tour de France winning the King of the Mountains jersey; He also achieved 2nd-place finished at the 1985 and 1986 Vuelta a España as well as runner up in the 1987 Giro d'Italia.

In the 2008 Beijing Olympic Games, Chris Hoy became the most successful British Olympian in over 100 years when he cycled to 3 golds in the velodrome in sprint events (Sprint, team sprint and keirin). His achievements earned him the honour of carrying the nation's flag in the closing ceremony and a knighthood in 2008.

Graeme Obree and David Millar (no relation) have also reached the very peak of their respective events.

== Curling ==
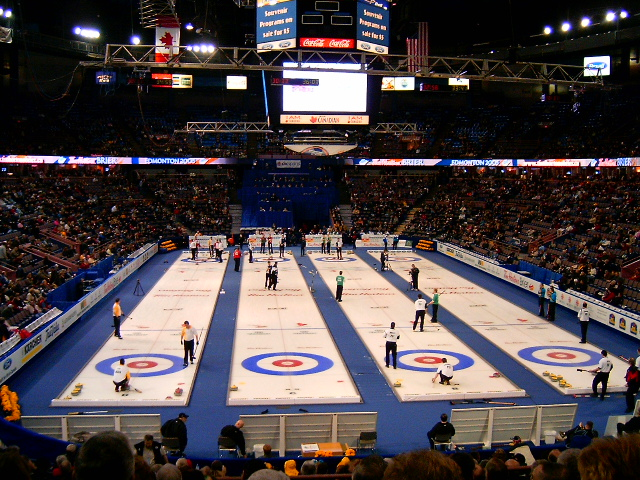
Curling matches in progress. Along with golf, shinty and rugby sevens, curling is one of Scotland's sporting inventions

Scotland is the home of curling which, although not as popular today as in Canada, remains more popular in Scotland than anywhere else in Europe. The Scottish men's team are the world's second most successful curling nation having won a total of 36 World Championship medals including seven golds, with the most recent coming in 2023 and 2025. The Scotland Women's Team have won 12 World Championships mdedals with gold on two occasions in 2002 and 2013. In the Mixed Doubles discipline Scotland have won two gold medals in 2021 and 2022.

Although elite-level curlers have been assisted significantly by funding from the National Lottery, facilities at the grassroots level have not benefited from this, with the number of ice rinks offering curling in Scotland declining from 31 in 1993 to 22 in 2018.

== Darts ==
Darts is popular in Scotland, with many pubs having their own teams. Former world champions from Scotland include Jocky Wilson, Les Wallace and Gary Anderson and John Henderson

== Gaelic Athletic Association ==
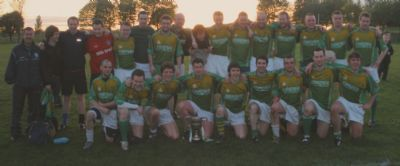
Tir Conaill Harps Gaelic football team

The Gaelic Athletic Association (GAA) has had a long history in Scotland, thanks to Scotland's substantial Irish population. The base of the GAA in Scotland is at Cambuslang, and GAA sports tend to be most popular in Greater Glasgow, although there is also a presence in various Scottish universities.

Scotland GAA is the GAA board that is responsible for Gaelic Games in Scotland. Scotland is treated as a "County" by the GAA.

=== Gaelic football ===
Gaelic football is played in Scotland, and the games are shown in some of the country's "Irish pubs". University teams have had great success, especially those of Heriot-Watt and Napier.

The "Gaelic" part of the name refers to Ireland, rather than Scotland.

The following teams play Gaelic football in Scotland: Dálriada, Dúnedin Connollys, Glaschu Gaels, Sands MacSwineys, and Tír Conaill Harps.

=== Hurling ===
Hurling is a close relative of the indigenous Scottish sport of shinty, and there is an annual international between Scotland's shinty players and Ireland's hurlers, using composite rules. The traditional forms of hurling played in Counties Antrim and Donegal, where many of Scotland's Irish immigrants originate from, were closest to Scottish shinty, and were at one point almost indistinguishable.

The Ireland national hurling team plays an annual international against a Scotland national shinty team under composite rules.

Camogie is also played to a basic level. Currently, there is only one hurling/camogie club in Scotland, Ceann Creige, which was established in 2019.

== Horseracing ==
As of 2020 Scotland has 5 BHA licensed racecourses. Hamilton Park races solely on the flat, Kelso and Perth provide jump racing under National Hunt Rules, while Ayr and Musselburgh are dual purpose courses providing both flat and jump racing. The flat racing course at Lanark was closed in October 1977.

Point-to-point racing over jumps for amateur riders takes place at Overton in Lanarkshire and at Friars Haugh and Mosshouses in the Borders. The point-to-point course Balcormo Mains in Fife was used for an annual fixture in 2019 but after the 2020 fixture was closed due to COVID-19 lockdown it was announced that the course would close with immediate effect.

The main meeting held is the Scottish Grand National, held over 4 miles and half a furlong at Ayr each April.

One of the most valuable flat handicaps in Europe is the Ayr Gold Cup held over 6 furlongs at Ayr each September.

== Pétanque ==
The French sport of Pétanque is administered and promoted in Scotland by the Scottish Petanque Association There are 11 affiliated clubs in Scotland and many other groups which play on a casual basis.

== Rowing ==
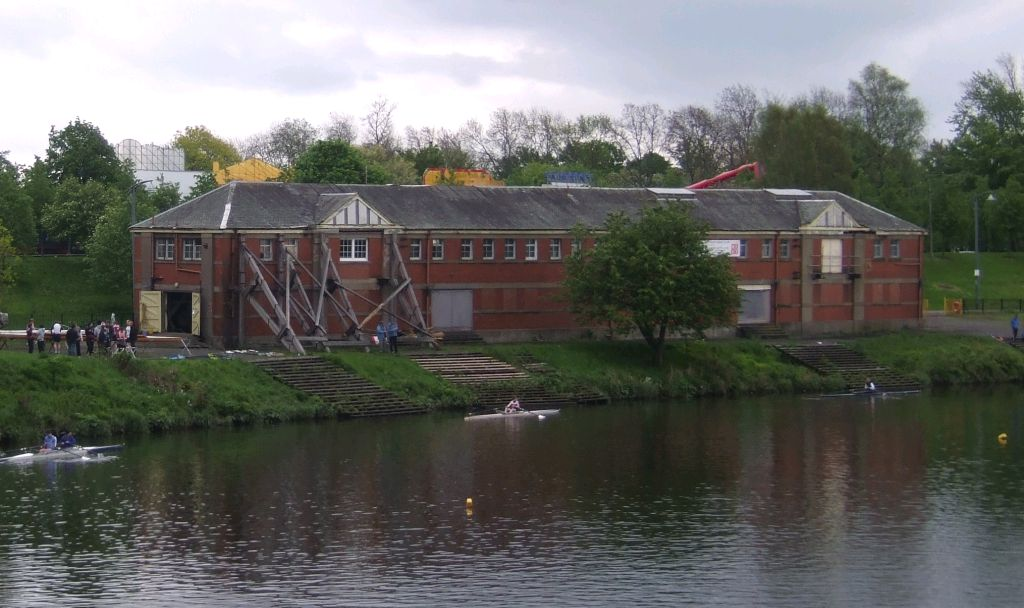
Glasgow East Boathouse

Strathclyde Country Park is the home to the Scottish Rowing Centre, including an Olympic standard 2 km rowing course that has hosted rowing events at the Commonwealth Games and World Rowing Championships.

Dame Katherine Grainger, with five Olympic medals, is Great Britain's most decorated female Olympian.

== Sailing ==
There are various events including the West Highland Yachting Week.

== Offshore power boat racing ==
Scotland hosts the UK's premier offshore power boat race, the P1 Scottish Grand Prix of the Sea.

== Skiing ==
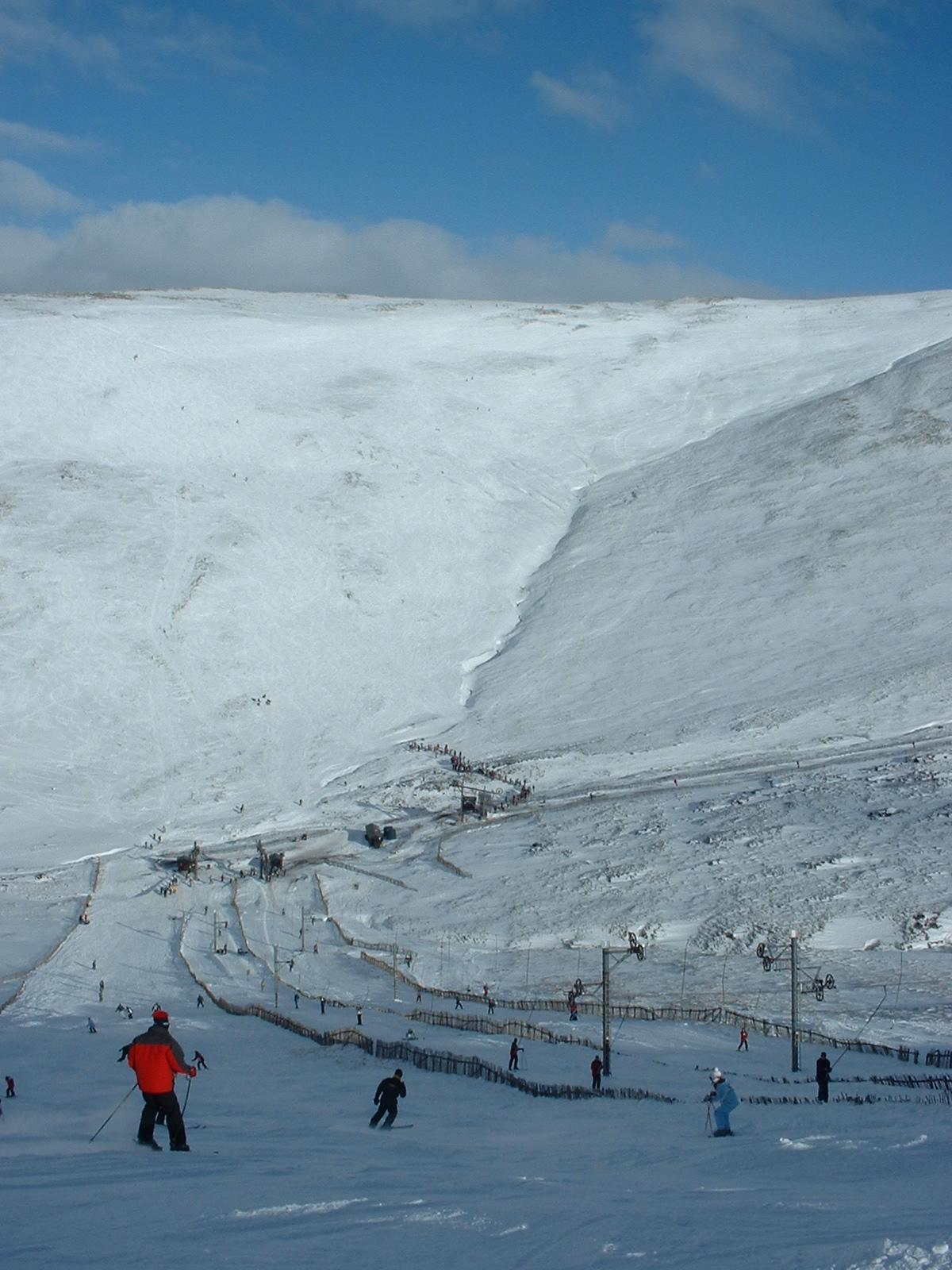
Coire Fionn and Glas Maol Poma, Glenshee Ski Centre

The Scottish Highlands are one of the few parts of the United Kingdom to have a number of ski resorts.

Aviemore is a centre for the sport in the Cairngorms. There are also other resorts such as Aonach Mòr, and slopes at Glencoe Ski area and Glenshee Ski Centre. The Midlothian Snowsports Centre near Edinburgh, known locally as "Hillend", is the largest dry ski slope in Europe.

== Speedway ==
Scotland currently has two Motorcycle Speedway teams racing in the SGB Championship, Glasgow Tigers and Edinburgh Monarchs.

== Swimming ==
The governing body is the Scottish Amateur Swimming Association. Most major urban centres and medium-sized towns have a swimming pool. Sea wild swimming has regained popularity after COVID pandemic in 2021.

== Sub aqua ==
=== Underwater hockey ===
Underwater hockey is a growing sport in Scotland. The nation has eight clubs registered with the British Octopush Association and regular sees native born players compete for Great Britain. Scottish underwater hockey overseas regional development within Scotland as well as the Scottish national team, but (like all home nations) the national side is rarely used in favour of the Great Britain team.

UWH Celtic Cup results

Year	A team	B team	Ref.
2022	1st	6th	
2023	Did not participate		
2024	1st	3rd	

== Surfing ==
The Scottish Surfing Federation was established in 1975 and conducts National Surfing Championships.

== Water polo ==
Water polo is considered to be invented in Scotland with the original rules being written by William Wilson for the Bon Accord Club in Aberdeen in 1877. It was based on a game played in the rivers Dee and Don in Aberdeen. The first game in a pool took place in Glasgow and the Scottish rules were those most adopted during the early years of the sport. Additionally, Scotland provided a number of Olympians to the GB squads that were successful in the early Olympics.

Scotland had a proud tradition of amateur water polo with many strong clubs across the country. However, it took a downturn after the early 1990s at which point it was successfully competing in home countries and 8 nations tournaments. As the rest of the world moved to deep water facilities, increased their training regime and professionalised their coaching structures, Scotland's water polo remained static and fell far behind. The national squad stopped competing in internationals in 2003 with the exception of the women's squad competing at the Commonwealth tournament in Perth in 2006. However, the sport has turned around since 2008 with fast growth of members, clubs and competitions. The national squads are once again competing internationally in the annual Celtic Nations tournament with recent wins in Women's 2010 & 2012 and Men's 2011. Scotland is expected to host the Commonwealth tournament in Aberdeen in April 2014.

== Blood sports ==
All forms of animal fighting e.g. cock fighting, dog fighting, badger baiting etc. are banned, and have been for a long time. Fox hunting and hare coursing have been banned much more recently, and the former has never had a major presence in Scotland.

=== Folk sports ===
Aside from the Highland Games, a few localities have preserved traditional sports from before the standardisation of games. These include the ba games of Jedburgh and Kirkwall, and various forms of folk shinty, known as 'knotty' or 'hummie', which use improvised materials.

== Multisport events ==
=== Highland games ===
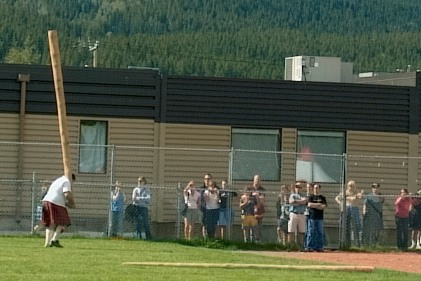
Caber toss, a distinctive Scottish athletic event

The Highland Games are a distinctive feature of the national sporting culture. There are numerous annual games hosted in the Highlands including Braemar and Dunoon. They are also popular in various parts of the world, where large numbers of Scottish emigrants have settled.

Events at the Highland Games often test physical strength, such as the weight over the bar and sheaf toss, and novelty events of recent origin such as haggis hurling.

=== Commonwealth Games ===
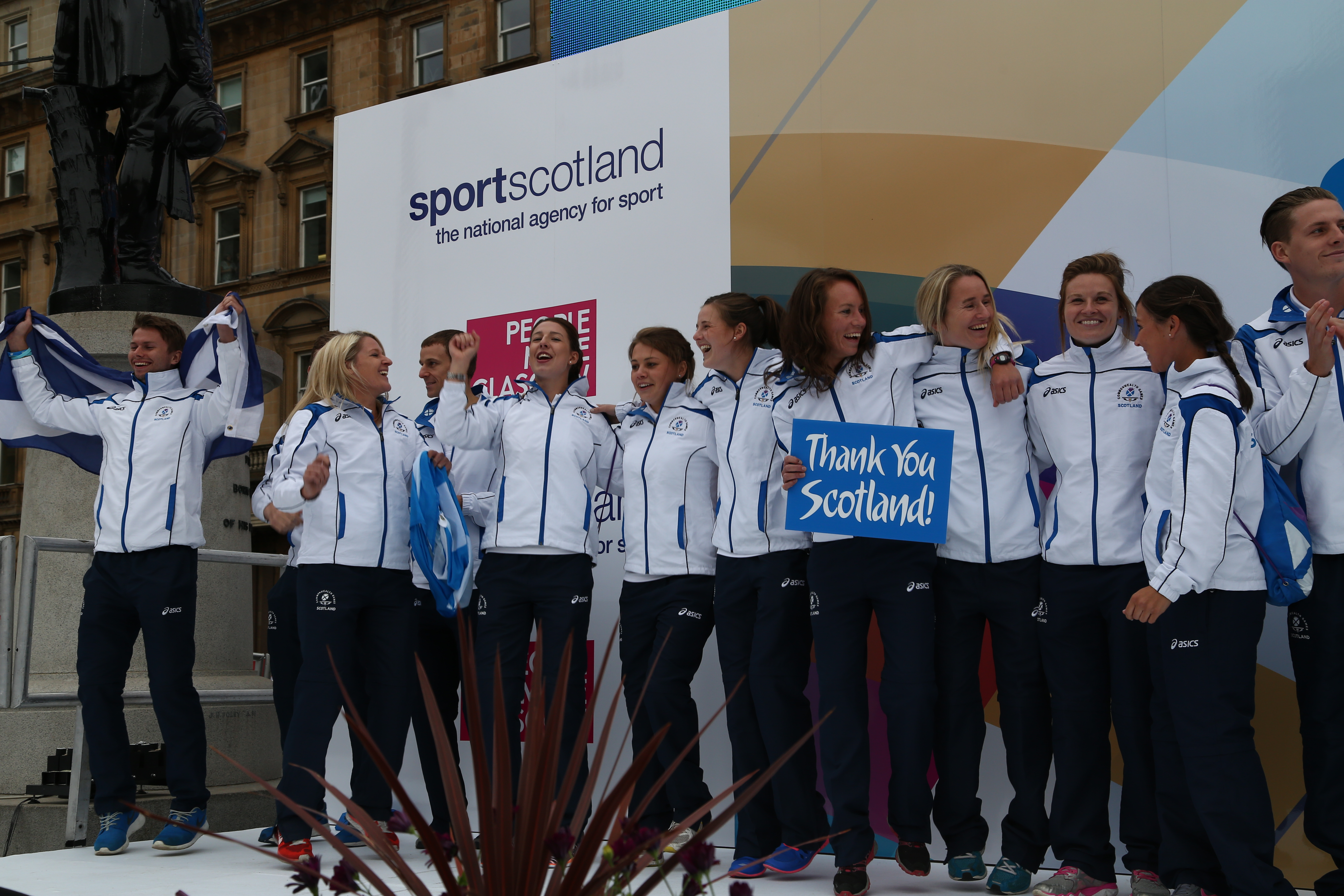
Athletes from Team Scotland parade through Glasgow following the 2014 Commonwealth Games

Scotland is one of only six countries to have competed in every Commonwealth Games since the first Empire Games in 1930.

Scotland has hosted the Commonwealth Games four times, Edinburgh in 1970 and 1986, and Glasgow in 2014 and 2026. The inaugural Commonwealth Youth Games were held in Edinburgh in 2000. 259 athletes and 166 officials were sent from Scotland to the 2022 Commonwealth Games in Birmingham, England, where Scotland won a total of 51 medals (13 Gold, 11 Silver and 27 Bronze).

=== Island Games ===
Scotland sends three teams to the Island Games tournament: one for the Orkney Islands, Shetland, and Outer Hebrides.

The 2005 Island Games were hosted by Shetland.

=== Olympic Games ===
Scottish athletes have competed at every Olympic Games, since the inaugural modern Games, as part of the Great Britain and Ireland team (prior to Irish independence) and then the Great Britain and Northern Ireland team. A Scot, Launceston Elliot, won Great Britain and Ireland's very first Olympic gold medal, in 1896 in Athens. Some of the most notable Scots athletes are Eric Liddell, (whose story is featured in the film Chariots of Fire), Alan Wells, the Olympic 100m winner in 1980, and Chris Hoy, winner of six cycling gold medals in 2004, 2008 and 2012.

Scotland have only ever won one Olympic medal as Scotland, when the men's field hockey team won a bronze medal at the 1908 Summer Games. This was also the only occasion when either England (gold) or Wales (bronze) have won a medal in their own right; and was Ireland's only medal (silver) prior to independence. The curling gold medal in Chamonix in 1924 was won by the Royal Caledonian Curling Club team, the Scottish national team, and the women's curling gold in Salt Lake City in 2002 was won by the top Scottish team at the time, skipped by Rhona Martin. There is a long-running Campaign for a Scottish Olympic Team

In 2009, two sports of Scottish origin, golf and rugby sevens were accepted into the Olympics. Curling has been an event at the Winter Olympics for many years.

For a list of Scottish Olympic medal winners, see Scottish Olympic medallists.

== Motorsport ==
Scotland has a notable track record of success in the world of motor sport, being one of only five countries in the world to have produced World Champions on two, three and four wheels.

Several Scottish competitors have had careers at the top level including Formula One, The World Rally Championship, Le Mans 24 hours, IndyCar Series, the British Touring Car Championship, Grand Prix motorcycle racing, the British Superbike Championship and the Sidecar World Championship.

=== Formula One ===
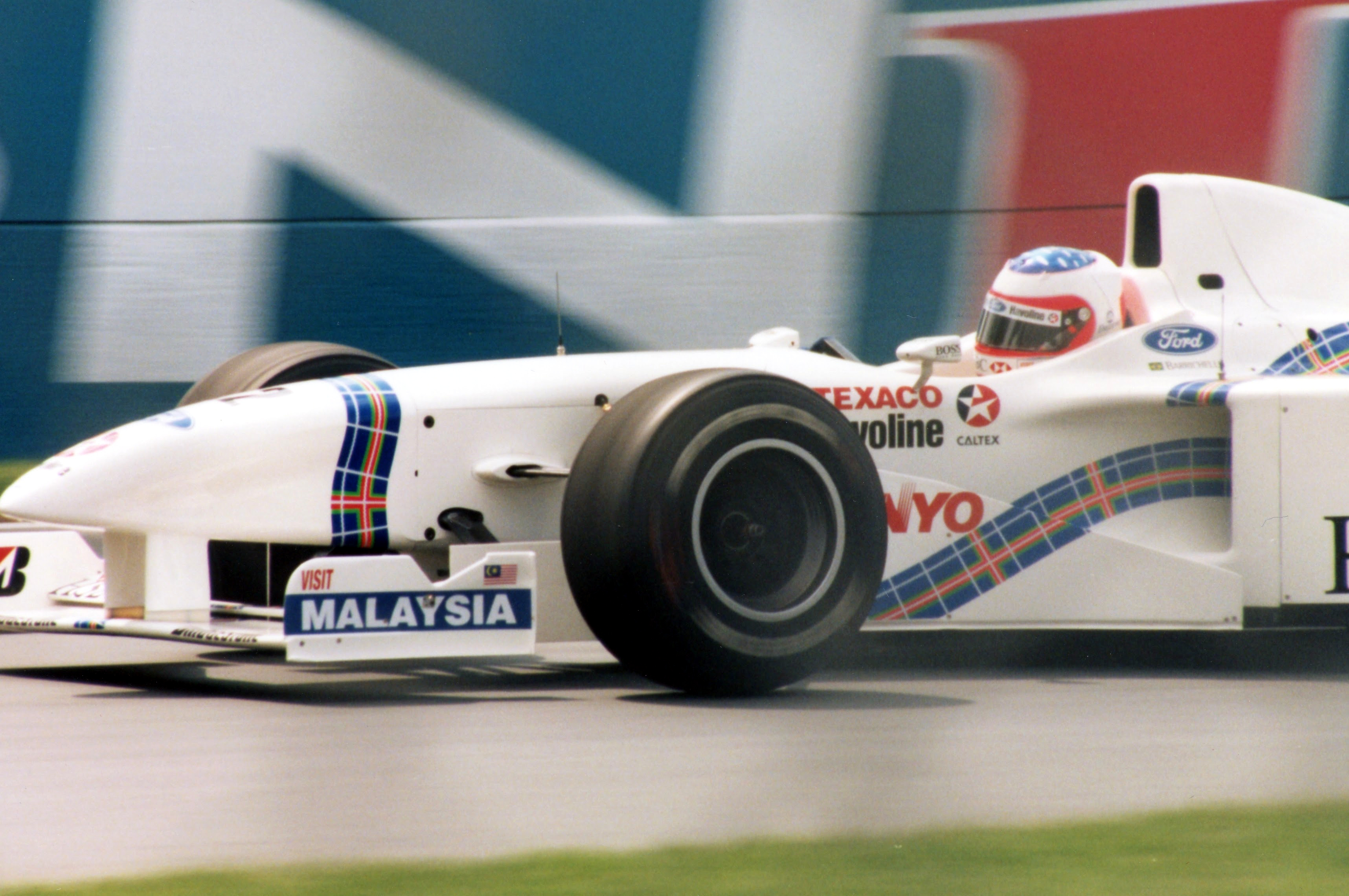
Rubens Barrichello driving for the Stewart Grand Prix team in Montreal in 1997. The tartan livery of the team was a special Stewart F1 tartan designed for the team and its addition to the cars indicates the Stewarts' origins in Scotland.

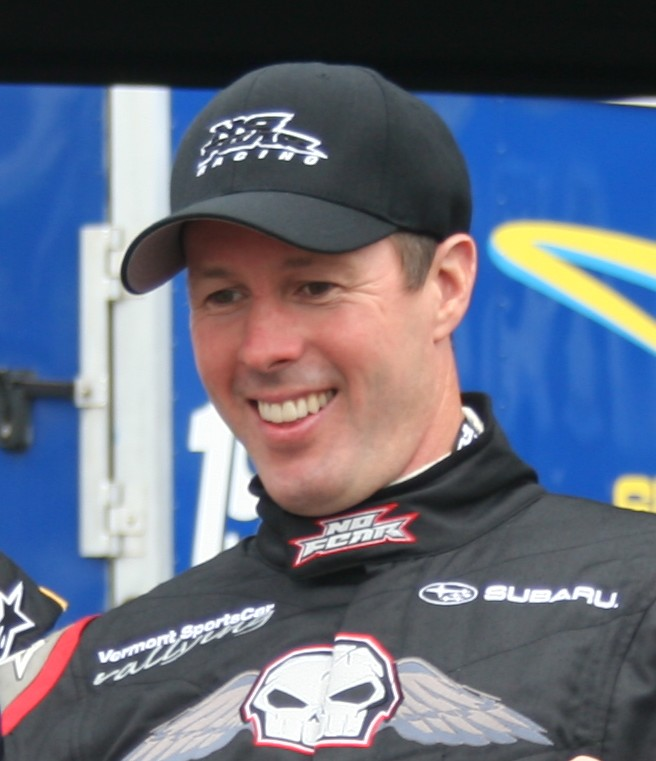
Colin McRae

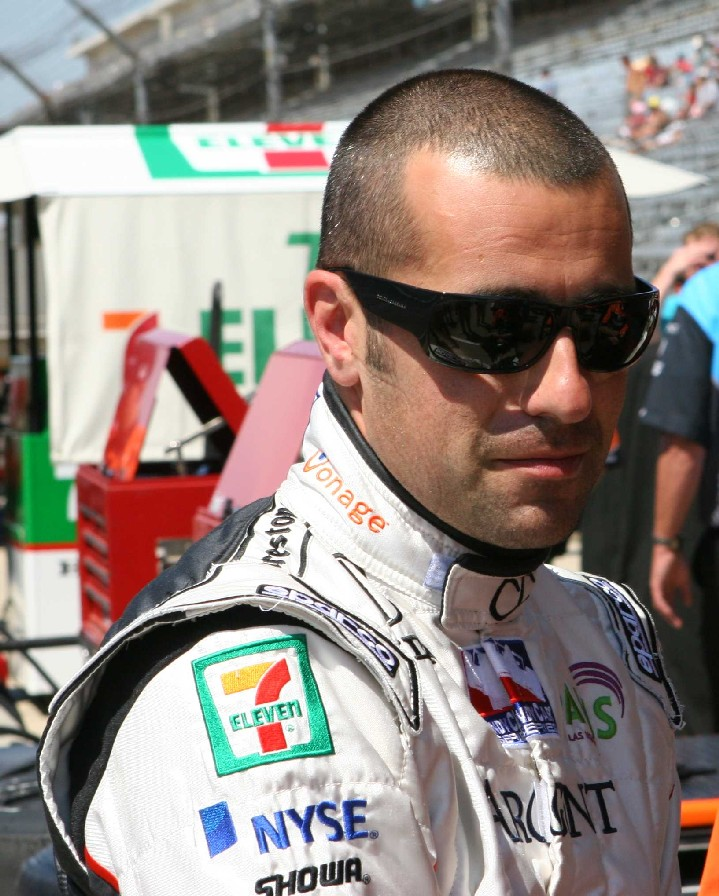
Dario Franchitti waiting to qualify on 12 May 2007 at Indianapolis.

Scotland has had several Formula One drivers over the years since the championship commenced in 1950. A full list of these drivers can be found at Category:Scottish Formula One drivers. Scotland's early successes in Formula One began with Innes Ireland, the Dumfries man winning Lotus’ first Grand Prix, at Watkins Glen in 1961. However, perhaps the best known Scottish drivers are Jim Clark, who won 2 World Championships before his untimely death, Jackie Stewart who managed to gain 3 World Championships and David Coulthard who raced from 1994 to 2008 with McLaren, Williams F1 and Red Bull F1. Coulthard has been Scotland's most successful driver in recent memory finishing runner up in the World Drivers Championships in 2001. Other recent successes include Bathgate's Paul di Resta who drove for Force India between 2010 and 2013 and Oban's Susie Wolff who in 2014 became the first woman to take part in a Formula One race weekend in 22 years, at the British Grand Prix, at Silverstone. No round of F1 has however been held in Scotland making the country one of the most successful countries without hosting a race, however a 50 lap 100-mile (160 km) motor race run to Formula One regulations called the Scottish Grand Prix was held in 1951 and there has been public discussion about the possibility of reviving the event in some form.

=== IndyCar ===
IndyCar refers to the top-level American single-seater racing championship and it just so happens that Scotland is home to one of the most successful drivers in the history of US single-seater racing – Dario Franchitti. Dario won the IndyCar Series championship four times and claimed the Indy 500 three times.

On 6 October 2013, he was involved in a serious crash at the Grand Prix of Houston, when his car flew into catch-fencing after contact with another car. Franchitti suffered two fractured vertebrae, a broken ankle and a concussion in the accident. A month later, on 14 November 2013, Franchitti announced his immediate retirement from motor racing on medical advice. He retired with 31 victories from 265 starts in American open-wheel racing, a tally which put him in a tie for ninth place on the all-time wins list.

The only other Scot to have had considerable success in US single seater racing, was the extremely versatile Jim Clark, who won the Indianapolis 500 in 1965.

=== Rallying ===
Aside from racing, Scotland has a long and distinguished history in stage rallying.

The McRae name is perhaps one of Scotland's most famous exports, with Colin McRae winning the World Rally Championship in 1995. His ‘flat-out’ driving style earned him millions of fans around the world and he enjoyed cult status during his 15-year career at the top of the sport. Colin was the son of 5-time British Rally Champion, Jimmy McRae, and brother of Alister McRae who also enjoyed success in the world of international rallying.

Scotland's most recent world crown was won in 2001, when Perthshire born co-driver Robert Reid won the World Rally Championship with Richard Burns.

Louise Aitken-Walker also made significant inroads into the male-dominated sport and is Britain's most successful female rally driver of all time, claiming the ladies world rally championship in 1990.

=== Endurance racing ===
One of the stories from the world of Scottish motorsport is that of the Ecurie Ecosse racing team. From a back-street mews garage in Merchiston, Edinburgh, the team beat household names such as Porsche and Ferrari. In 1956, David Murray's team won the famous 24 Hours of Le Mans race with a privately entered D-type Jaguar, driven by Scotsmen Ron Flockhart and Ninian Sanderson.

In more recent years, Scotland has continued to enjoy success in the world of endurance and sports car racing. Dumfriesshire's Allan McNish competed in F1 in 2002 for Toyota, but is best known for becoming one of the all-time greats in the gruelling world of sportscar racing, winning the 24 Hours of Le Mans three times and finishing on the podium on no fewer than six further occasions. In 2013, he also won the FIA World Endurance Championship (FIA WEC). Peter Dumbreck has also competed in the 1999 24 Hours of Le Mans, and is better known for his infamous accident in the 1999 event where his Mercedes-Benz CLR car suffered aerodynamic problems and took off, somersaulting through the air. In 2012, Bathgate's Marino Franchitti was confirmed as the first driver of Nissan's innovative DeltaWing as an unclassified entrant at Le Mans and in 2014 he won the 12 Hours of Sebring. Another star Scottish endurance driver is Ryan Dalziel who in 2012 won the FIA World Endurance Championship, as well as taking a class wins in the 24 Hours of Le Mans and in the 12 Hours of Sebring.

=== BTCC ===
In the British Touring Car Championship Scotland has had a double champion in John Cleland. A number of drivers have raced successfully in recent years including Anthony Reid, David Leslie and Gordon Shedden, who won the championship in 2012. One round of the championship is annually held at Knockhill in Scotland.

=== Motorcycle sport ===
In motorcycling, the legends continue. Jock Taylor took the Sidecar World Championship in 1980 and Jimmy Guthrie and Bob McIntyre both set the standard for Scottish motorcycle competitors on either side of the war.

In the 1980s and 1990s, Niall Mackenzie and Steve Hislop led the way. Mackenzie competed in the 500cc Grand Prix championship (now MotoGP) for nine years from 1986 to 1994, only twice finishing outside the top ten. He went on to win the British Superbike Championship no less than three times.

Borders man Steve Hislop won the British Superbike Championship in 1995 although was better known for his success in the Isle of Man TT races, winning no less than eleven TTs.

In recent years Stuart Easton continues the charge for Scotland in the British Superbikes, while John McPhee promotes the Scots abroad, running in the highly competitive Spanish Moto3 class.

The Scottish off-road motorcycling scene has produced numerous British Enduro and Motocross champions, most recently Richard Hay in the British Enduro Veteran Class. Euan McConnell contested the World Enduro Championship from 2001 to 2007. In 2009 and 2010 teams from Scotland competed to medal results in the International Six Days Enduro and in each of the same years Scottish riders successfully finished the gruelling Dakar Rally as the first Scots to do so. Scotland can even claim a World Champion in motorcycle stunt riding with Kevin Carmichael taking the title in 2002.

=== Scottish motorsport venues ===
There are various motor sport venues throughout Scotland, the biggest of which is Knockhill Racing Circuit in Fife.

For motorcycle sport in Scotland, the governing body is the SACU.

== Sports media ==
Scotland has a distinct set of media products, especially when it comes to sports coverage. The main Scottish daily newspapers, the Daily Record, The Herald and The Scotsman, have extensive coverage of Scottish and international sport; and coverage of Scottish sport is one of the key tools used by Scottish editions of British newspapers, most successfully employed by The Scottish Sun. However, the vast majority of sports coverage in Scotland is of association football.

There are also a variety of magazine titles. Titles include The Celtic View, Rangers News, bunkered, Scottish Club Golfer and Rally Action.

The main sports television shows on the largest two channels are Scotsport on STV and ITV1 Border Scotland (which is recognised by the Guinness Book of Records as the world's longest running sports television programme) and Sportscene on BBC Scotland. BBC Radio Scotland's main sports show is Sportsound, and it has other sports output, for example the comedy show Off the Ball. All the main independent radio stations report on local sport, and often cover football matches live (although not the SPL, to which the BBC hold exclusive radio rights).

BBC Alba's Spòrs shows one full, delayed SPL match.

In 2011, QuipuTV – a multimedia production company and digital broadcaster specialising in livestreaming – launched with the aim of providing a digital platform for minority sports in Scotland. They produce live programming for Cricket Scotland, Scottish Hockey Union, Scottish Swimming, and Netball Scotland.

== Student sport ==
Coordinated by Scottish Universities Sport (SUS), universities in Scotland participate in British Universities and Colleges Sport (BUCS) as well as holding varsity matches and supporting the national development of elite athletes.

== See also ==
- List of national sports teams of Scotland
- Politics and sports
- BBC Scotland Sports Personality of the Year
- Sportscotland
- Scottish Institute of Sport
- Scotsport
- Sport in Glasgow
- Sport in the United Kingdom
- Sport in England
- Sport in Northern Ireland
- Sport in Wales
