= Sport in Glasgow =

Sport plays an important role in the culture of Glasgow, the largest city in Scotland. Association football is particularly popular: Glasgow is known for the fierce Old Firm rivalry between Scotland's most successful clubs, Celtic and Rangers. The national stadium, Hampden Park, is located in the city and stages most home matches of the Scotland national team, as well as the finals of the Scottish Cup and Scottish League Cup. The Scottish Football Association (SFA) and Scottish Professional Football League (SPFL) are both also based at Hampden. The world's first official international match took place in Glasgow in 1872.

Glasgow was the host city for the 2014 and 2026 Commonwealth Games. It was named the European Capital of Sport in 2023.

The city also has professional teams in rugby union, basketball and speedway. The city formerly had teams in American football and basketball.

== Football ==
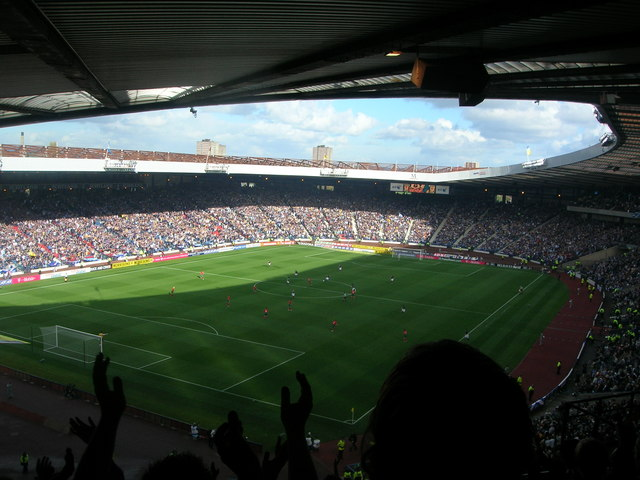
Hampden Park is Scotland's national football stadium, hosting most major cup finals and international matches

The city is home to Scotland's largest football stadia: Celtic Park (60,411 seats), Ibrox Stadium (51,700 seats) and Hampden Park (51,866 seats), which is Scotland's national football stadium. Hampden Park holds the European record for attendance at a football match: 149,547 saw Scotland beat England 3–1 in 1937, in the days before British stadia became all-seated (though old Wembley had been reputed to hold over 200,000 unofficially).

Glasgow has four professional football clubs: Celtic and Rangers, which together make the Old Firm, Partick Thistle and as of November 2019, Queen's Park, that plays in the Scottish professional league system. Prior to this, Glasgow had other league clubs: Clyde, which moved to Cumbernauld, plus Third Lanark who went bankrupt in 1967, as well as Cowlairs, Clydesdale, Linthouse, Northern and Thistle in the 19th century. Senior teams such as St Mirren, Dumbarton, Hamilton Academical, Clyde, Albion Rovers, Airdrie United and Motherwell are based close to Glasgow.

The history of football in the city, as well as the status of the Old Firm, attracts many visitors to matches throughout the season. Hampden Park has been awarded UEFA 'Category Four' status, meaning that it is capable of hosting the final of the Champions' League. Hampden Park has hosted the final on three occasions, most recently in 2002 and hosted the UEFA Cup Final in 2007 as well as matches in the international 2012 Olympic Games and UEFA Euro 2020 tournaments.

The Scottish Football Association, the national governing body, and the Scottish Football Museum are based in Glasgow, as are the Scottish Professional Football League, Scottish Junior Football Association and Scottish Amateur Football Association. The Glasgow Cup was once a popular tournament in which all professional teams from the city would compete, however, now only their youth teams enter.

Teams in the Scottish Professional Football League are:

Club	Venue	Capacity
Celtic	Celtic Park	60,411
Rangers	Ibrox Stadium	51,700
Partick Thistle	Firhill Stadium	10,102
Queen's Park	Lesser Hampden	990

Below is a list of active clubs from the Glasgow area which have played in the West Region of the Scottish Junior Football Association since that setup was established in 2002 (several more could be included if the complete Greater Glasgow conurbation was taken into consideration, plus others which had a prominent role in the first half of the 20th century but went defunct long ago):

- Ashfield
- Benburb F.C.
- Glasgow Perthshire F.C.
- Maryhill F.C.
- Petershill F.C.
- Pollok F.C.
- Shettleston F.C.
- St Anthony's F.C.
- St Roch's F.C.
- Vale of Clyde F.C.

== Rugby ==
Glasgow also boasts a professional rugby union team, the Glasgow Warriors, which play in the United Rugby Championship alongside teams from Ireland, Italy, Scotland, South Africa and Wales.

In addition, Glasgow is home to several amateur teams who compete at all levels throughout Scottish Rugby. These include:

- Glasgow Hawks
- West of Scotland
- Glasgow Hutchesons' Aloysians
- Hillhead Jordanhill

== Other Sports ==
Major international sporting arenas include Kelvin Hall and Scotstoun Sports Centre. In 2003 the National Academy for Badminton was completed in Scotstoun. In 2003 Glasgow was also given the title of European Capital of Sport.

Smaller sporting facilities include an abundance of small outdoor football pitches, as well as golf clubs such as Haggs Castle and artificial ski slopes.

Befitting its strong Highland connections as the City of the Gael Baile Mòr nan Gàidheal, Glasgow is also one of five places in Scotland which hosts the final of the Scottish Cup of Shinty, better known as the Camanachd Cup. This is usually held at Old Anniesland. Once home to numerous Shinty clubs, there is now only one senior club in Glasgow, Glasgow Mid-Argyll, as well as two university sides, Strathclyde University and Glasgow University

Glasgow was also the birthplace of Scotland's American football scene, which although not as strong as in its early years continues to the present day. The Glasgow Lions were the first team to be formed in Scotland in 1984. Between 1998 and 2004, the Scottish Claymores played some or all of their home games each season at Hampden and the venue also hosted World Bowl XI.

Glasgow was also host to Scotland's only professional basketball team, the Glasgow Rocks, before the teams move to the Playsport Arena in East Kilbride and their rebrand to the Caledonia Gladiators.

Speedway racing is staged at Saracen Park in Hawthorn Street, on the north side of the City. During March to October the Glasgow Tigers race in the British Premier League.

Glasgow Green has been home to Glasgow's rowing clubs since the mid-nineteenth century. Crowds of spectators turned up to watch regattas in the late 19th and early 20th centuries. Although the crowds now watch football instead, rowing on the Clyde continues to this day. Glasgow University Boat Club thrives alongside other academic and public clubs and there are a number of competitions held on the river every year.

Glasgow bid to host the 2018 Summer Youth Olympics but lost to Buenos Aires in the 4 July 2013 vote.

== Venues and Stadiums ==
=== Football ===
- Hampden stadium
- Firhill Stadium
- Ibrox Stadium
- Celtic Park
- Lesser Hampden

=== Athletics ===
- Emirates Arena
- Scotstoun Stadium

== 2014 Commonwealth Games ==
The 2014 Commonwealth Games were held in Glasgow from 23 July to 3 August 2014. It was the largest multi-sport event ever held in Scotland with around 4,950 athletes from 71 different nations and territories competing in 18 different sports, outranking the 1970 and 1986 Commonwealth Games in Edinburgh. Over the last 10 years, however, Glasgow and Scotland had staged World, Commonwealth, European, or British events in all sports proposed for the 2014 Commonwealth Games, including the World Badminton Championships in 1997. The Games received acclaim for their organisation, attendance, and the public enthusiasm of the people of Scotland, with Commonwealth Games Federation chief executive Mike Hooper hailing them as "the standout games in the history of the movement". Held in Scotland for the third time, the Games were notable for the successes of the Home Nations of the United Kingdom, with England, Wales and hosts Scotland achieving their largest ever gold medal hauls and overall medal hauls at a Commonwealth Games. England finished top of the medal table for the first time since the 1986 Commonwealth Games, also held in Scotland. Kiribati also won its first ever medal at a Commonwealth Games, a gold in the 105 kg men's weightlifting competition.

=== ICSEMIS ===
The International Convention on Science, Education and Medicine in Sport (ICSEMIS) is to 3,000-delegates in Glasgow from 19 to 27 July 2012. The event will generate an economic impact for the city in addition to strengthening Glasgow's credentials for hosting major sporting events in the run up to the Commonwealth Games in 2014.

== See also ==
- Sport in Scotland
