= Monterrey bid for the 2018 Summer Youth Olympics =

Bids for the 2018 Summer Youth Olympics
Overview
- Games of the III Youth Olympiad

Details
- City: Monterrey, Mexico
- NOC: Comité Olímpico Mexicano

Previous Games hosted
- none

Monterrey 2018 was a bid by the city of Monterrey to host the 2018 Summer Youth Olympics.

== History ==
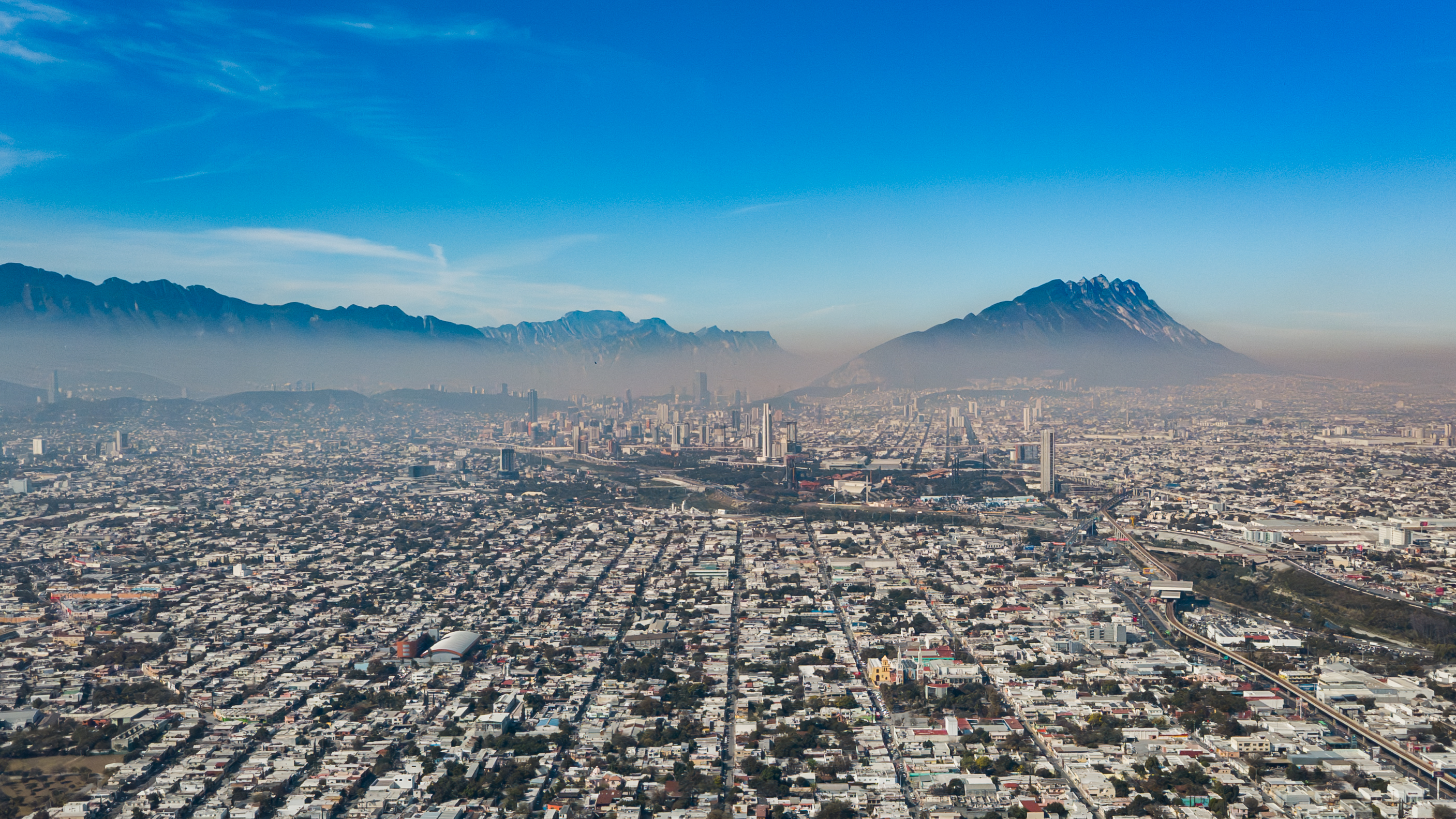
Monterrey

Monterrey was the first city to bid for the 2018 Summer Youth Olympics. Monterrey had never bid for an Olympic Game prior to their effort to bid for the 2014 Summer Youth Olympics. The city did host several matches of the 1986 FIFA World Cup. In January 2011 Monterrey 2018 released a promotional video to promote their bid.

On November 18, 2011, the bid got the endorsement of Monterrey Mayor Fernando Larrazabal Breton.

Buenos Aires was ultimately elected as the host city of the 2018 Summer Youth Olympic Games on July 4, 2013.

=== Previous bids from other Mexican Cities ===
Monterrey expressed interest in hosting the 2014 Summer Youth Olympics but the Mexican Olympic Committee selected Guadalajara to go forward as Mexico's bid. They became a candidate but received an unfavorable evaluation in the IOC's evaluation report which was published before the February 2010 vote on the host city. Guadalajara withdrew their bid following this report. Nanjing was ultimately awarded the 2014 games.

Mexico City hosted the Summer Olympic Games in 1968. Mexico City made two bids prior to their 1968 bid. They bid for the 1956 and 1960 Summer Olympics, but lost to Melbourne and Rome respectively.

== See also ==
- Mexico at the Olympics
- Guadalajara bid for the 2018 Summer Youth Olympics
- Bids for the 2018 Summer Youth Olympics
