= Guadalajara bid for the 2018 Summer Youth Olympics =

Bids for the 2018 Summer Youth Olympics
Overview
- Games of the III Youth Olympiad

Details
- City: Guadalajara, Mexico
- NOC: Comité Olímpico Mexicano

Previous Games hosted
- none

Guadalajara 2018 was a bid by the city of Guadalajara and the Comité Olímpico Mexicano to host the 2018 Summer Youth Olympics.

== History ==
On February 16, 2012, Guadalajara's bid was selected over Monterrey's bid to bid to host the 2018 Summer Youth Olympics by an inner voting from the Mexico National Olympic Committee

It was reported in August 2012 that the bid may be in danger due to the debt created by the 2011 Pan American Games.

Guadalajara failed to become a Candidate City for the games when the IOC selected the Candidate cities on February 13, 2013.

Buenos Aires was ultimately elected as the host city of the 2018 Summer Youth Olympic Games on July 4, 2013.

== Previous bids from other Mexican cities ==
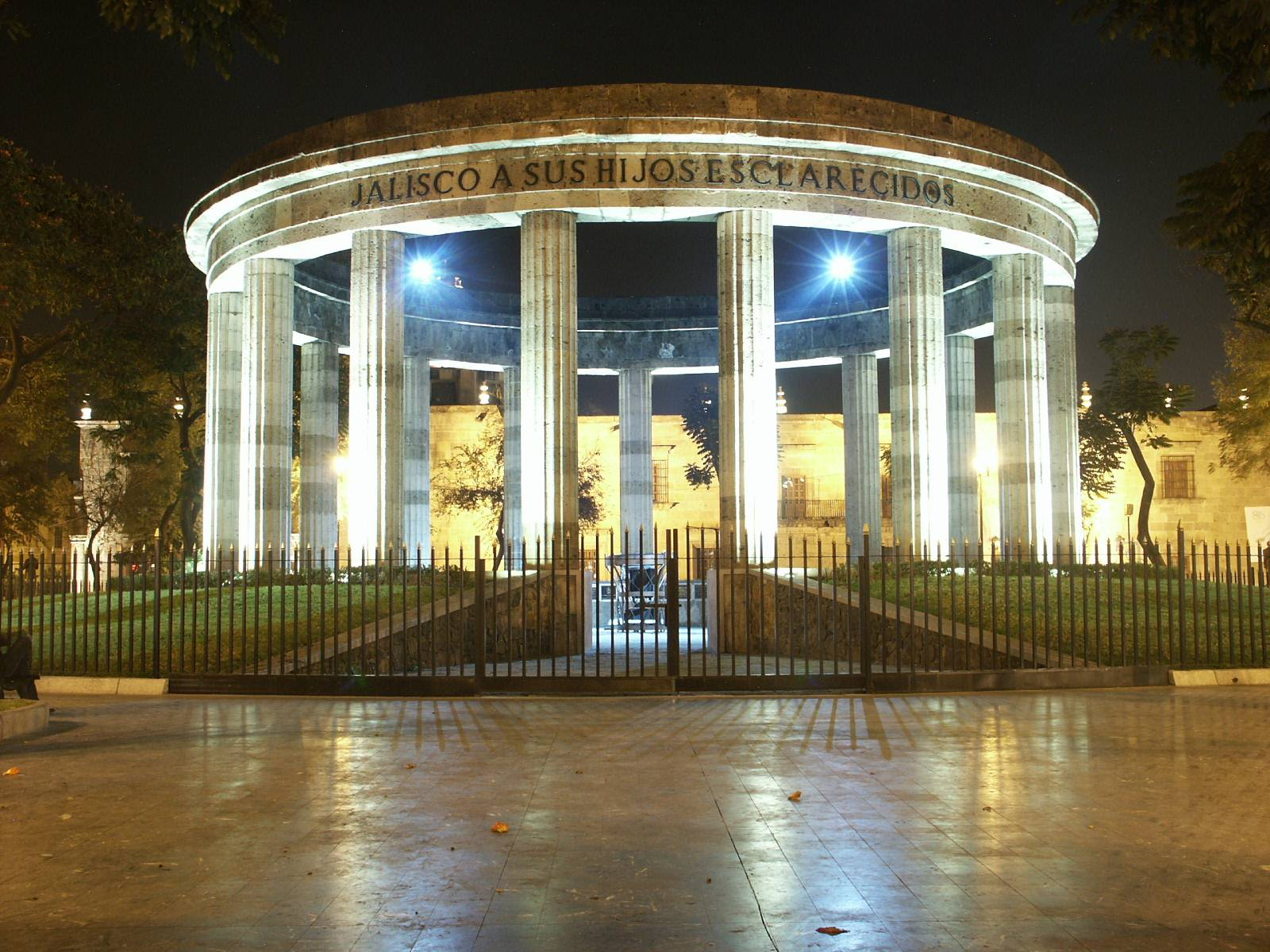
The Rotonda de los Jaliscienses Ilustres at night

Guadalajara was elected previously to bid to host the 2014 Summer Youth Olympics but withdrew their bid following this report. Nanjing was ultimately awarded the 2014 games.

Mexico City hosted the Summer Olympic Games in 1968. Mexico City made two bids prior to their 1968 bid. They bid for the 1956 and 1960 Summer Olympics but lost to Melbourne and Rome respectively.

Guadalajara had previously hosted the 2011 Pan American Games and bid for the 2017 World Aquatics Championships, but withdrew. The championships were awarded to Budapest.

== See also ==
- Monterrey bid for the 2018 Summer Youth Olympics
- Mexico at the Olympics
- Bids for the 2018 Summer Youth Olympics
