= Buenos Aires bid for the 2018 Summer Youth Olympics =

Bids for the 2018 Summer Youth Olympics
Overview
- Games of the III Youth Olympiad

Details
- City: Buenos Aires, Argentina
- NOC: Argentine Olympic Committee

Previous Games hosted
- None

Buenos Aires 2018 was the successful bid by the city of Buenos Aires and the Argentine Olympic Committee to host the 2018 Summer Youth Olympics.

== History ==
=== Applicant City phase ===
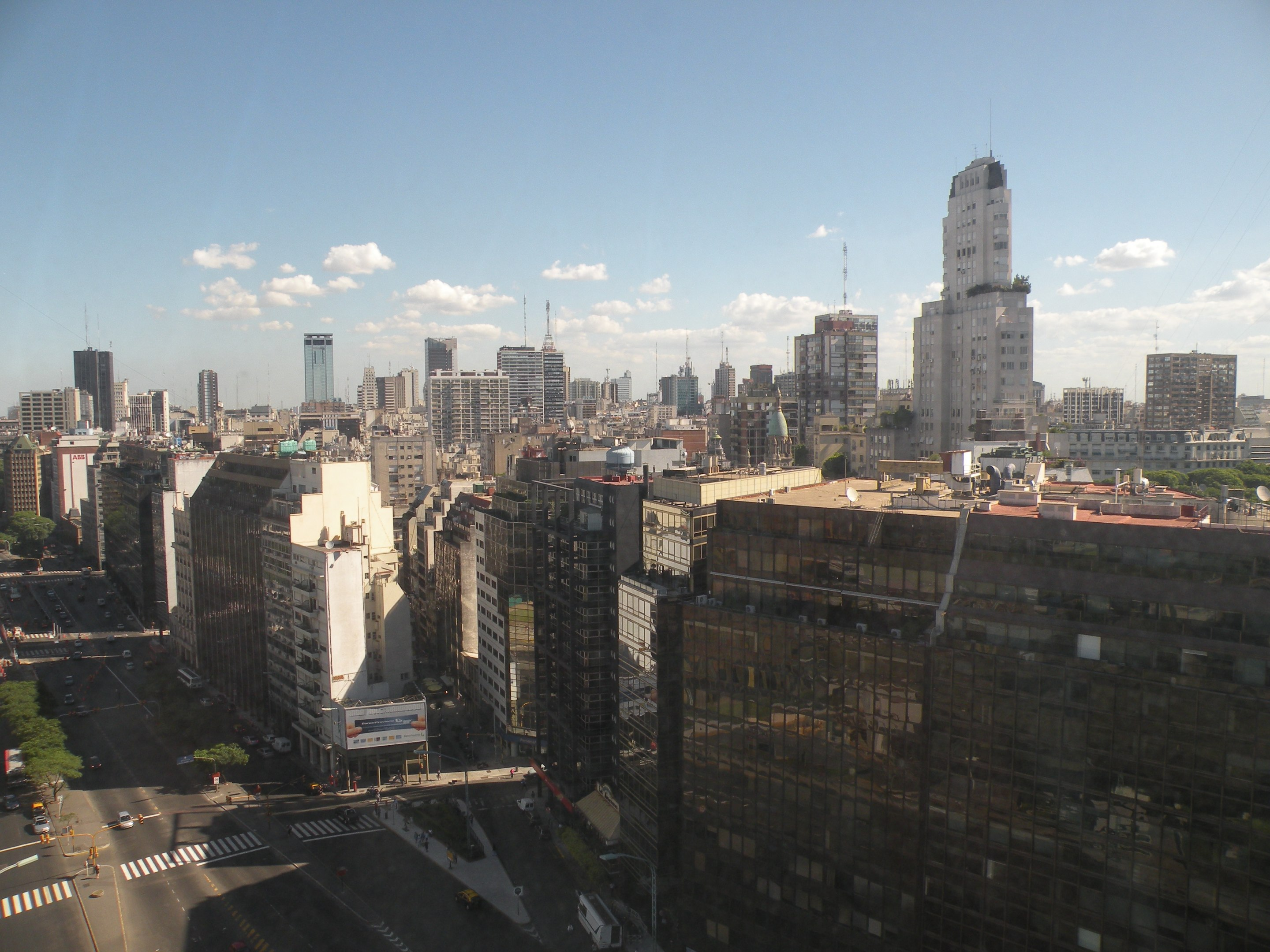
View of Downtown Buenos Aires.

It was announced on August 30, 2011, that Buenos Aires would bid for the 2018 Summer Youth Olympics.

Buenos Aires 2018 announced in January 2012 that they had appointed Vero Communications to promote the bid. Argentine IOC Member and Argentine Olympic Committee head Gerardo Werthein as well as Buenos Aires Mayor Mauricio Macri wrote letters to IOC President Jacques Rogge in support of the bid.

Buenos Aires signed the Youth Olympic Games Candidature Procedure on March 15, 2012.

In May 2012, it was suggested that if Buenos Aires is successful in being awarded the 2018 Summer Youth Olympic Games, that the city could bid for the 2028 or 2032 Summer Olympics.

In June 2012, it was announced that La Punta was bidding to host the 2019 Pan American Games.

Buenos Aires hosted the 125th IOC Session in September 2013 where Tokyo was elected to host the 2020 Summer Olympics.

=== Candidate City phase ===
On February 13, 2013, the IOC selected Buenos Aires as one of the three Candidate Cities for the 2018 Summer Youth Olympic Games.

In June 2013, the IOC Evaluation Commission released their report of the candidate cities and found that Buenos Aires' bid carried minimal risk. The report did however express concerns over issues related to the dates of the proposed games as well as financial guarantees. Buenos Aires 2018 later addressed these issues in response to the report.

On July 4, 2013 Buenos Aires was elected as the host city of the 2018 Summer Youth Olympics.

== Previous bids ==
The Buenos Aires bid for the 2018 Youth Olympic Games is the city's first bid for the Summer Youth Olympics. Buenos Aires has made several Summer Olympic bids in the past.

Buenos Aires previously bid to host the 2004 Summer Olympics but lost to Athens in the first round of voting. The city was tied with Cape Town in the first round. The IOC members voted to keep Cape Town in the election as the IOC went to the next round of voting. Buenos Aires bid for the 1968 Summer Olympics but lost to Mexico City. Buenos Aires bid to host the 1956 Summer Olympics but lost to Melbourne by only one vote. The city's first bid was for the 1936 Summer Olympics which it lost to Berlin.

== See also ==
- Argentina at the Olympics
- Bids for the 2018 Summer Youth Olympics
