= Medellín bid for the 2018 Summer Youth Olympics =

Bids for the 2018 Summer Youth Olympics
Overview
- Games of the III Youth Olympiad

Details
- City: Medellín, Colombia
- NOC: Colombian Olympic Committee

Previous Games hosted
- none

Medellín 2018 was a bid by the city of Medellín and the Comité Olímpico Colombiano to host the 2018 Summer Youth Olympics.

== History ==
=== Applicant City phase ===
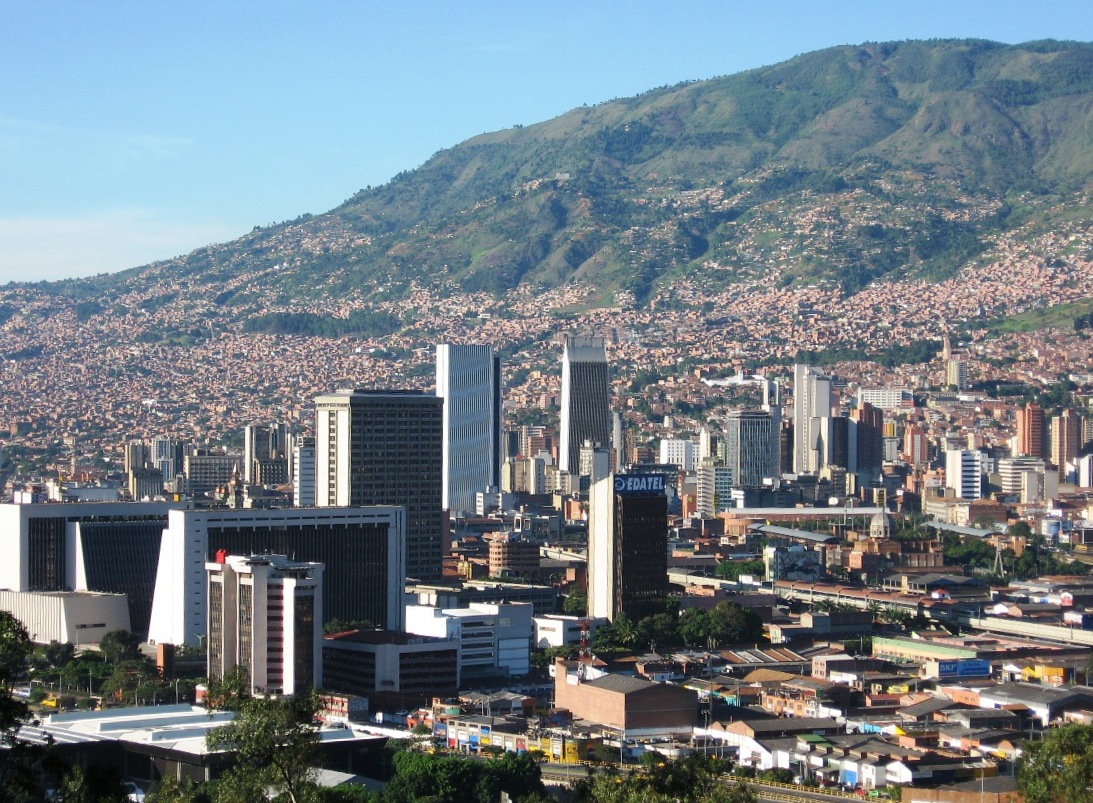
Medellín skyline

Medellín bid for the games after successfully hosting the 2010 South American Games and having all the venues already built in the complex Atanasio Girardot. Colombia has never made an Olympic bid before. The country held the 1971 Pan American Games in Cali. In January 2012, Andres Botero Phiillipsbourne was promoted to Sports Minister of Colombia. He is an IOC member and will be working to promote the bid.

Medellín 2018 signed the Youth Olympic Games Candidature Procedure in March 2012.

In July 2012 Juan Camilo Quintero Medina was appointed CEO of the bid.

=== Candidate City phase ===
On February 13, 2013, the IOC selected Medellín as one of the three candidate cities for the 2018 Summer Youth Olympic Games.

In June 2013, the IOC Evaluation Commission released their report on the candidate cities and found that Medellín's bid carried minimal risk.

On July 4, 2013, after the voting process, Buenos Aires was selected over Medellin to host the 2018 Summer Youth Olympics. Medellin received 39 votes in the final round and Buenos Aires received 49.

== See also ==
- Colombia at the Olympics
- Bids for the 2018 Summer Youth Olympics
