= Spòrs =

Scottish sports television programme

BBC Alba has the rights to various sporting events, which it covers in the medium of Scottish Gaelic and under the umbrella of its Spòrs sports television programme. The programme is entirely in Scottish Gaelic apart from some interviews which are conducted in English. The programme is usually shown on Saturday evenings, although for live coverage of events this will tend to be at other times.

== Coverage ==
=== Football ===
Coverage of football extends across various divisions and cups. BBC Alba's coverage of the SPL includes one full delayed SPL match that is not already being covered live by another channel. In addition, BBC Alba will soon be broadcasting selected games from the Scottish First Division.

BBC Alba also shows live coverage of the Scottish Challenge Cup, which is currently sponsored by one of its operators MG Alba.

=== Rugby Union ===
Currently, BBC Alba broadcasts highlights and selected live matches from the Scottish Premiership Division One rugby union league.

=== Shinty ===
BBC Alba covers various events from the game of shinty, including the Camanachd Cup.

== Presenters ==
Evelyn Coull is the main presenter of all Spòrs' programmes. Co-presenters are Martin MacDonald and Ruaraidh Munro. Match commentators include Derek MacKay, Ailig O'Henley and Hugh Dan MacLennan.

== Guests ==
People who have appeared on the programme include:

- Alex Salmond
- Brian Laudrup
- Kenny Dalglish
- Jackie McNamara
- Murdo MacLeod
- Tommy Docherty
