= Scottish Grand Prix of the Sea =

The P1 Scottish Grand Prix of the Sea was an annual two day marine motorsport event held in Greenock in Scotland. The event hosted around 30,000 spectators and was free to attend. Spectators gathered on the Greenock Esplanade to view the boat races and in 2016 the event was also made available on a number of international television networks including Sky Sports in the UK. The Esplanade hosted a number of exhibition and trade stands, and featured food and drink stands from high end Glasgow and Edinburgh food producers. There are races for a number of classes of offshore powerboat and jet ski. The event is considered the premier marine motorsport event in the UK.

The event brought roughly £2.3m into the Greenock economy each year and was hosted by Inverclyde Council and Riverside Inverclyde. The event has sponsorship from a number of local and international firms, including the UK's largest ferry network operator. The event is additionally supported by the Royal Navy's HM Naval Base Clyde, who also help out with security and policing. The event had served as an opportunity for the Scottish and wider UK marine leisure industry to showcase their products and network, serving as an unofficial boat show. The event drew a number of high-profile attendees, including the First Minister of Scotland.

Despite success and Inverclyde council putting budget aside to host again in 2018 the event organisers P1 SuperStock decided not to carry on with the event, and to instead direct their resources towards the USA championship and developing the sport in Asia.

== See also ==
- Offshore powerboat racing
