= Glasgow bid for the 2018 Summer Youth Olympics =

Failed Olympic bid by Glasgow, Scotland in 2018

Bids for the 2018 Summer Youth Olympics
Overview
- Games of the III Youth Olympiad

Details
- City: Glasgow, Great Britain
- NOC: British Olympic Association

Previous Games hosted
- none

Glasgow 2018 was a bid by the city of Glasgow and the British Olympic Association to host the 2018 Summer Youth Olympics.

== History ==
=== Applicant City phase ===
On 19 September 2011, it was announced that Glasgow would bid for the 2018 Summer Youth Olympics. Glasgow hosted the 2014 Commonwealth Games. The city cites the preparations for the Commonwealth Games as a step forward in being able to make a strong bid for the Youth Olympic Games. On 22 February 2012, the BOA agreed to put Glasgow forward as the United Kingdom's bidding city for the 2018 Summer Youth Olympics.

In April 2012, Glasgow was awarded the 2015 IPC Swimming European Championships.

On 28 June 2012, the Glasgow City Council unanimously voted to approve the Glasgow 2018 bid.

Scotland, Wales and Ireland placed a bid to co-host UEFA Euro 2020. However, this plan failed when UEFA announced that the event will be held across Europe in multiple countries.

In July 2012, Glasgow 2018 established their bid board which is being led by BOA Chairman Colin Moynihan. It also comprises Shona Robison who is the Scottish minister for the Commonwealth Games as well as Gordon Matheson who is the leader of the Glasgow City Council. British Prime Minister David Cameron threw his support behind the bid later that month.

=== Candidate City phase ===
On 13 February 2013, the IOC selected Glasgow as one of the three candidate cities for the 2018 Summer Youth Olympic Games.

In June 2013, the IOC Evaluation Commission released their report of the candidate cities and found that the Glasgow bid carried minimal risk.

Glasgow 2018 stated in June 2013, that if elected as host city, that young people would be involved with the Organizing Committee.

Glasgow was awarded the 2015 European Judo Championships on 27 June 2013, one week before the IOC votes to select the host city of the 2018 Summer Youth Olympics.

On 4 July 2013, Glasgow was eliminated in the first round of voting in the host city election. Glasgow received 13 votes in the first round. Buenos Aires went on to be elected as the host city of the 2018 Summer Youth Olympics in the final round of voting.

== Previous bids from other British cities ==
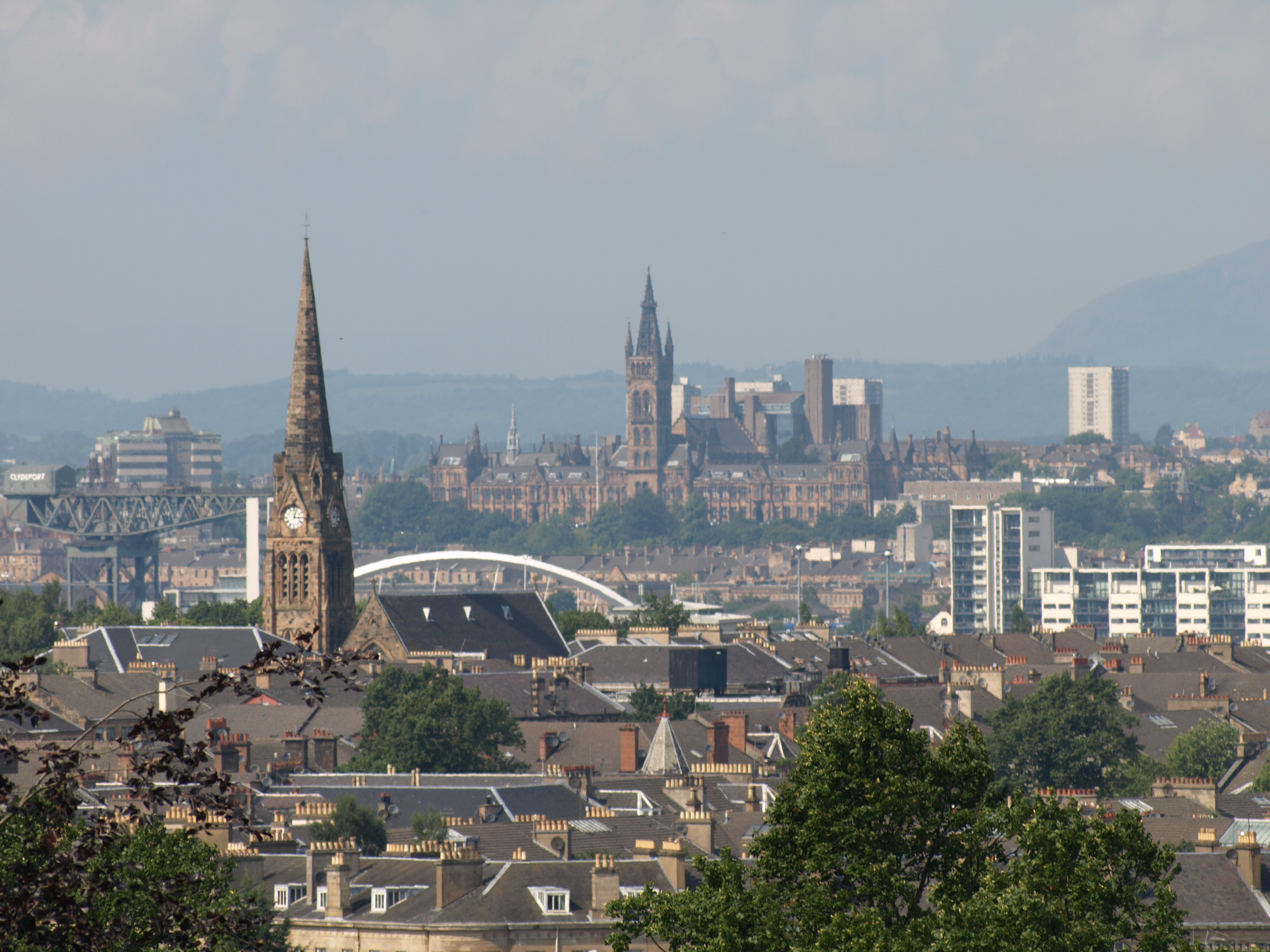
View of Glasgow's South Side and West End from Queen's Park

Glasgow's bid for the 2018 Summer Youth Olympics marked the first time a city in Scotland has made a bid for an Olympic Game.

London has made four successful bids for the Summer Olympic Games in the past. They were awarded the 1908, 1944, 1948 and 2012 Summer Olympics. The 1944 Games however were cancelled due to World War II, however London still hosted the games three years after the war ended.

Birmingham bid to host the 1992 Summer Olympics but lost to Barcelona. Manchester bid for the 1996 and 2000 Summer Olympics but lost to Atlanta and Sydney respectively.

== See also ==
- 2014 Commonwealth Games
- Great Britain at the Olympics
- Bids for the 2018 Summer Youth Olympics
