= Malloch Trophy =

Fishing award competed for in Scotland

The Malloch Challenge Trophy is Scotland's most prestigious award for salmon fishing. The award is given for the largest salmon caught on the fly and safely returned to the water in Scotland each year.

The award was founded in 1972 by the noted fishing tackle manufacturer and retailer Mallochs of Perth and first presented to Lady Burnett for a 43lb salmon caught on the Tay. Over the years winning fish have come from a number of Scottish rivers, including the Dee, Spey, Tweed, Tay and Naver. In 1999 the trophy ceased to be awarded due to a combination of loss of sponsorship and stringent conservation measures but was acquired by the Tay foundation in 2009 who reinstated the competition with a change to the criteria to require fish to be returned to the water. In recent years the trophy has been sponsored variously by Savills and FishPal. There is also a junior version of the award.

== List of winners of the Malloch Trophy ==
| Year | Winner | Weight | River |
|---|---|---|---|
| 2009 | Sandy Walker | 32lbs | River Lochy |
| 2010 | Huston McCollough | 36lbs | River Spey |
| 2011 | Sam Valentine | 43.5lbs | River Nith |
| 2012 | Jim Reid | 50lbs (est.) | River Tweed |
| 2013 | Shamus Jennings | 50lbs | River Tweed |
| 2014 | Wayne Longstaff | 33lbs | River Tweed |
| 2015 | Tom Buchanan | 35lbs | River Lyon, a tributary of the River Tay |
| 2016 | John MacIssac | 38-41lbs | River Spean |
