= World Union of Karate Do Federations =

International governing body of sport karate

- Sport: Karate
- Jurisdiction: Worldwide
- Abbreviation: WUKF
- Founded: 2005; 21 years ago
- Affiliation: Non-IOC
- Regional affiliation: World
- Headquarters: Herstal
- Location: Belgium
- President: Liviu Crisan of Romania
- Vice president(s): Koos Burger of South Africa; Søren Helsted of Denmark; Roberto Morreale of Italy; Jo Mirza of United States
- Secretary: Roberto Perri of Belgium
- Sponsor: KO Italia KO Italia srl Katara Martial Arts; Brizbane Sports; Budoland
- Replaced: 1996
- (founded): 1970

Official website
- www.wukf-karate.org
- Other key staff: Osvaldo Messias de Oliveira of Brazil

The World Union of Karate Do Federations (WUKF) is the international governing body of sport karate with 85 member countries. The main headquarters of the organization is located in Herstal under the supervision of Belgium Ministry of Justice and Belgium Royal House. The events of this federation are held regularly every year in the member countries.

== History ==
In June 2009, at the scheduled congress, affiliate members will discuss and decide on all decisions necessary for the good work of the organization. The name is new but the organization is the same, all former (WUKO) affiliates have sent support letters (except FESIK and 4 other federations), all (WUKF) events are scheduled as before, the organization will continue to live.

== Members ==
Asia
| Iran | India | Bangladesh | Kazakhstan |
| Kuwait | Kyrgyzstan | Indonesia | Sri Lanka |
| China | Philippines | Jordan | Pakistan |
| United Arab Emirates | Uzbekistan | | |

Europe
| Azerbaijan | Kosovo | San Marino | Italy | Wales |
| England | Russia | Turkey | Lithuania | Scotland |
| Georgia | Portugal | Ukraine | Montenegro | Ireland |

Panamerica
| Argentina | Brazil | Canada | Caribbean Community |
| Chile | Dominican Republic | Honduras | Mexico |
| Panama | Peru | Puerto Rico | USA |
| Uruguay | | | |

Africa
| Algeria | Morocco | Tunisia | Egypt |
| Ghana | Libya | Namibia | South Africa |
