= Bids for the 2018 Summer Youth Olympics =

Overview
- Games of the III Youth Olympiad
- Winner: Buenos Aires; Runner-up: Medellín; Shortlist: Glasgow

Details
- Committee: IOC
- Election venue: Lausanne

Map of the bidding cities

Important dates
- Bid: March 1, 2012
- Shortlist: February 13, 2013
- Decision: July 4, 2013

Decision
- Winner: Buenos Aires (49 votes)
- Runner-up: Medellín (39 votes)

Six bids were made for the 2018 Summer Youth Olympics. The IOC selected three of the bids as candidate cities. On July 4, 2013, Buenos Aires was elected as host city.

== Bidding timeline ==
The International Olympic Committee (IOC) launched the bidding process on September 15, 2011. A letter was sent out to all National Olympic Committees (NOCs). The key dates are the following:

- 2012
  - March 1: Deadline for NOCs to submit to the IOC of the names of YOG Applicant Cities
  - March 2: IOC announced that six applications for the 2018 Summer Youth Olympics have been received
  - March 15: Signature of YOG Candidature Procedure
  - October 15: Submission of YOG Candidature File and other documents
  - October to December: Examination of replies by IOC and experts
- 2013
  - February 13: Shortlist of YOG Candidate Cities by the IOC Executive Board
  - February: Additional questions to shortlisted Candidate Cities
  - March: Video conferences between the bid committees and the IOC Evaluation Commission
  - June 4: Report by the IOC Evaluation Commission
  - July 4: Election of the host city of the 3rd Summer Youth Olympic Games in 2018.

=== Vote ===
The host city election vote was held at an extraordinary IOC Session in Lausanne. The results were as follows:

2018 Summer Youth Olympics Host City Election Results
City	NOC Name	Round 1	Round 2
Buenos Aires	Argentina	40	49
Medellín	Colombia	32	39
Glasgow	United Kingdom	13	–

== Candidate cities ==
There were six bids for the 2018 Summer Youth Olympic Games confirmed by the International Olympic Committee. Bids were due by March 1, 2012. The list of applicant cities was announced by the IOC on March 2, 2012.

For the first time, Asian NOCs didn't submitted a bid for the Summer Youth Olympics, thus making it the first time that Asia will not bid, and eventually, host the Games. Three European NOCs (Great Britain, The Netherlands and Poland) entered Glasgow, Rotterdam and Poznań bids respectively. American NOCs Argentina, Colombia and Mexico also submitted bids for Buenos Aires, Medellín and Guadalajara respectively. Poznan withdrew their bid in October 2012.

On February 13, 2013, the IOC Executive Board selected three candidate cities.

=== Buenos Aires, Argentina ===
On August 30, 2011, Buenos Aires and the Argentine Olympic Committee announced that they will bid for the 2018 Summer Youth Olympic Games. Buenos Aires bid to host the 1956 and 2004 Summer Olympics but lost to Melbourne and Athens respectively.

=== Glasgow, United Kingdom ===
On September 19, 2011, it was announced that Glasgow would submit to the British Olympic Association (BOA) a proposal to bid for the 2018 Summer Youth Olympics. Glasgow hosted the 2014 Commonwealth Games. The city has never made an Olympic bid before. On February 22, 2012, the BOA agreed to put Glasgow forward as the United Kingdom's bidding city for the 2018 Summer Youth Olympics.

Glasgow's bid for the 2018 Summer Youth Olympics marked the first time a city in Scotland has made a bid for an Olympic Games.

London has made four successful bids for the Summer Olympic Games in the past. They were awarded the 1908, 1944, 1948 and 2012 Summer Olympics. The 1944 Games however were cancelled due to World War II, however London still hosted the games three years after the war ended.

=== Medellín, Colombia ===
Medellín bid for the games after successfully hosting the 2010 South American Games and having all the venues already built in the complex Atanasio Girardot. Colombia has never made an Olympic bid before. The country held the 1971 Pan American Games in Cali. In January 2012, Andres Botero Phiillipsbourne was promoted to Sports Minister of Colombia. He is an IOC member and will be working to promote the bid.

== Non-selected applicant cities ==
=== Guadalajara, Mexico ===
Guadalajara was selected over Monterrey on February 16, 2012, to be put forward as an applicant city. Guadalajara bid for the 2014 Summer Youth Olympics but withdrew their bid before the IOC vote due to a poor evaluation report. Guadalajara hosted the 2011 Pan American Games.

=== Rotterdam, Netherlands ===
On February 29, 2012, the day before the deadline for bid for the 2018 Summer Youth Olympics, it was announced that Rotterdam would be putting forth a bid.

== Cancelled bids ==
=== Poznań, Poland ===
Upon the announcement by the IOC of who the applicant cities were, Poznań was revealed as one of the bidders. The city bid for the 2010 and 2014 Summer Youth Olympics but lost to Singapore and Nanjing respectively. On 8 October, the city council rejected the proposal budget of the bid. There were lack of financial guarantees from the city-organizer, so the city withdrew.

== Bids which did not go to application ==
The following cities proposed putting forth bids, but ultimately failed to do so:

- Toulouse, France
- Abuja, Nigeria
- Kaspiysk, Russia
- Durban, South Africa
- Gothenburg, Malmö or Stockholm, Sweden
- Dubai, United Arab Emirates
- Raleigh, United States
