= List of sailors at the Summer Olympics =

Sailing at the Summer Olympic Games
- Sailors at the Summer Olympics
- Dates: 1896–1952 (1956–current missing)

This list consists of sailors who have competed in sailing at the Summer Olympics.

The number of rows (flags) for each sailor equals the number of times the individual sailor represents their country. The country name behind each flag links to the national team in the specific Summer Olympics.

Legend for images in "Gender" column: = female, = male

== A ==
Olympic sailors by last name: A
Athlete	Gender	Team	Year
Thomas Aas	Male	Norway	1912
Albert van den Abeele	Male	Belgium	1936
Sten Abel	Male	Norway	1920
Morgan Adams	Male	United States	1936
Herman von Adlerberg	Male	Russia	1912
Henrik Agersborg	Male	Norway	1920
Luis Domingo Aguirre	Male	Argentina	1936
Rolando Aguirre	Male	Argentina	1924
Arthur Ahnger	Male	Finland	1912
Olle Åkerlund	Male	Sweden	1932
Auguste Albert	Male	France	1900
A. L. Albrecht	Male	Switzerland	1948
Kenneth Harrison Albury	Male	Bahamas	1952
Konstantin Aleksandrov	Male	Soviet Union	1952
Lev Alekseev	Male	Soviet Union	1952
Max Alfthan	Male	Finland	1912
H. Allard	Male	France	1928
Jacques Henry Jules Allard	Male	France	1952
R. Allen	Male	Ireland	1948
Juan Manuel Alonso-Allende	Male	Spain	1948
Arthur Allers	Male	Norway	1920
Erland Almqvist	Male	Sweden	1952
Percy Almstedt	Male	Sweden	1920
Santiago Amat Cansino	Male	Spain	1924
Santiago Amat Cansino	Male	Spain	1928
Santiago Amat Cansino	Male	Spain	1932
Karl-Robert Ameln	Male	Sweden	1952
Karl-Robert Ameln	Male	Sweden	1948
Roger Anciaux	Male	Belgium	1948
J.J. Andersen	Male	Denmark	1928
Francisco Rebello de Andrade	Male	Portugal	1952
Curt Andstén	Male	Finland	1912
Jarl Andstén	Male	Finland	1912
Dietz Angerer	Male	Austria	1928
Dietz Angerer	Male	Austria	1936
Erik Anker	Male	Norway	1928
Johan Anker	Male	Norway	1908
Johan Anker	Male	Norway	1912
Johan Anker	Male	Norway	1928
Pierre Arbaut	Male	France	1936
Charles Arentz	Male	Norway	1920
Tor Arneberg	Male	Norway	1952
J. M. Arteche y Olabarri	Male	Spain	1928
Henri Arthus	Male	France	1908
Temple Ashbrook	Male	United States	1932
John Aspin	Male	Great Britain	1908
Gunnar Asther	Male	Sweden	1932
Peter Attrill	Male	Australia	1952
Giorgio Audizio	Male	Italy	1948
Giorgio Audizio	Male	Italy	1952
Michel Auréglia	Male	Monaco	1952
Otto Aust	Male	Sweden	1912

== B ==
Olympic sailors by last name: B
Athlete	Gender	Team	Year
Henri Bachet	Male	France	1936
Klaus Baess	Male	Denmark	1948
Ramon Balcells	Male	Spain	1952
Bruce Bernard Banks	Male	Great Britain	1952
Håkon Barfod	Male	Norway	1948
Håkon Barfod	Male	Norway	1952
Émile Barral	Male	Monaco	1924
Émile Barral	Male	Monaco	1928
John Craig Barrington-Ward	Male	Great Britain	1952
William A. Bartholomae Jr.	Male	United States	1936
Karlo Bašić	Male	Yugoslavia	1952
Jacques Baudier	Male	France	1900
Lucien Baudier	Male	France	1900
Yves Baudrier	Male	France	1936
Karlo Bauman	Male	Yugoslavia	1952
Karlo Bauman	Male	Yugoslavia	1936
Raymond Bauwens	Male	Belgium	1920
Jose Luis Allende Y Garcia Baxter	Male	Spain	1948
James Baxter	Male	Great Britain	1908
Behzat Baydar	Male	Turkey	1936
Edgar Behr	Male	Germany	1932
Duarte de Almeida Bello	Male	Portugal	1948
Duarte de Almeida Bello	Male	Portugal	1952
Fernando Pinto Coelho Bello	Male	Portugal	1948
Fernando Pinto Coelho Bello	Male	Portugal	1952
Miles Bellville	Male	Great Britain	1936
Esper Beloselsky	Male	Russia	1912
Knut Bengtson	Male	Norway	1948
Gösta Bengtsson	Male	Sweden	1920
Eric Creighton Benningfield	Male	South Africa	1952
Jacob Ralph van den Berg	Male	Netherlands	1948
Per Bergman	Male	Sweden	1912
Åke Bergqvist	Male	Sweden	1932
Dick Bergström	Male	Sweden	1912
Kurt Bergström	Male	Sweden	1912
Carl Viggo Berntsen	Male	Denmark	1936
Einar Berntsen	Male	Norway	1920
Ole Berntsen	Male	Denmark	1948
Ole Berntsen	Male	Denmark	1952
William Berntsen	Male	Denmark	1948
William Berntsen	Male	Denmark	1952
Nils Bertelsen	Male	Norway	1912
G. Bertin	Male	France	1948
Petrus Beukers	Male	Netherlands	1920
E. Beyn	Male	Germany	1928
Bruno Bianchi	Male	Italy	1936
Bruno Bianchi	Male	Italy	1948
John Biby	Male	United States	1932
J. B. Bidegaray	Male	Uruguay	1948
Ludwig Bielenberg	Male	Germany	1952
Jan Bier	Male	Netherlands	1948
Arnoud van der Biesen	Male	Netherlands	1920
Emile Billiard et Perquer	Male	France	1900
Claudio Bincaz	Male	Argentina	1936
Norman Bingley	Male	Great Britain	1908
Aage Birch	Male	Denmark	1952
Halvor Birkeland	Male	Norway	1920
Rasmus Birkeland	Male	Norway	1920
Fritz Bischoff	Male	Germany	1936
Peter Bischoff	Male	Germany	1936
Carlos Melo Bittencourt Filho	Male	Brazil	1948
Waldemar Björkstén	Male	Finland	1912
Jacob Björnström	Male	Finland	1912
Frédéric Blanchy	Male	France	1900
C. E. Bleck	Male	Portugal	1928
Christopher Boardman	Male	Great Britain	1936
Rick Bockelie	Male	Norway	1924
Folke Bohlin	Male	Sweden	1948
Sidney Boldt-Christmas	Male	Sweden	1952
David Bond	Male	Great Britain	1948
P. Bonnet	Male	Switzerland	1948
Carlos Borchers	Male	Brazil	1948
Martin Borthen	Male	Norway	1920
Miguel Bosch	Male	Argentina	1928
Bertil Bothén	Male	Sweden	1912
Björn Bothén	Male	Sweden	1912
Donatien Bouché	Male	France	1928
Gardner Boultbee	Male	Canada	1932
João José Bracony	Male	Brazil	1948
Kenneth Alexander Bradfield	Male	Canada	1952
Ernst Brasche	Male	Russia	1912
Jorge Emilio Brauer	Male	Argentina	1948
Jorge Emilio Brauer	Male	Argentina	1952
Detlow von Braun	Male	Sweden	1936
Andreas Brecke	Male	Norway	1912
Andreas Brecke	Male	Norway	1920
Louis Bréguet	Male	France	1924
Bror Brenner	Male	Finland	1912
Gösta Brodin	Male	Sweden	1948
Bertel Broman	Male	Finland	1928
Frédéric Bruynseels	Male	Belgium	1920
M. Bruzzone	Male	Italy	1928
Håkon Bryhn	Male	Norway	1928
Hans Robert Bryner	Male	Switzerland	1948
Hans Robert Bryner	Male	Switzerland	1952
Kurt Bryner	Male	Switzerland	1948
Kurt Bryner	Male	Switzerland	1952
Edward Bryzemejster	Male	Poland	1924
John Buchanan	Male	Great Britain	1908
James Bunten	Male	Great Britain	1908
A. Burger	Male	Hungary	1928
Eduard Bürgmeister	Male	Czechoslovakia	1924
Alphonse Burnand	Male	United States	1932
Charles van den Bussche	Male	Belgium	1920
Douglas Raymond Buxton	Male	Australia	1952
Ingeman Peter Bylling Jensen	Male	Denmark	1952

== C ==
Olympic sailors by last name: C
Athlete	Gender	Team	Year
Albert Cadot	Male	France	1948
Gaston Cailleux	Male	France	1900
Georgios Calambokidis	Male	Greece	1948
Noël Libert Calone	Male	France	1952
Axel Calvert	Male	Sweden	1920
F. Cameli	Male	Italy	1928
Charles Campbell	Male	Great Britain	1908
H. Campi	Male	Argentina	1952
Giuseppe Canessa	Male	Italy	1948
Joao Felix da Silva Capucho	Male	Portugal	1948
Antonio Carattino	Male	Italy	1952
Giuseppe Carattino	Male	Italy	1952
Carlos de Cárdenas Culmell	Male	Cuba	1952
Carlos de Cárdenas Plá	Male	Cuba	1952
Jorge de Cárdenas Plá	Male	Cuba	1952
Kenneth Carey	Male	United States	1932
Fernand Carlier	Male	Belgium	1924
Robert Carlson	Male	United States	1932
Börje Carlsson	Male	Sweden	1952
John Carlsson	Male	Sweden	1908
C. Carolou	Male	Greece	1948
Bernard Carp	Male	Netherlands	1920
Johan Carp	Male	Netherlands	1920
Johan Carp	Male	Netherlands	1924
Johan Carp	Male	Netherlands	1936
A. Carrasco	Male	Argentina	1948
Jean Castel	Male	France	1948
Arne Frithiof Louis Castrén	Male	Finland	1952
Édouard Chabert	Male	France	1952
Britton Chance	Male	United States	1952
Philippe Chancerel	Male	France	1948
François Chapot	Male	Switzerland	1952
Jean-Baptiste Charcot	Male	France	1900
A. Chatord	Male	France	1948
Jorge Alberto de Rio Salas Chaves	Male	Argentina	1948
Dietrich Christensen	Male	Germany	1936
Edvart Christensen	Male	Norway	1912
Henning Roger Christensen	Male	Denmark	1952
Øivind Christensen	Male	Norway	1936
Øivind Christensen	Male	Norway	1948
Sigurd Frank Christensen	Male	Denmark	1936
Eigil Christiansen	Male	Norway	1912
Hans Christiansen	Male	Norway	1912
Lauritz Christiansen	Male	Norway	1920
Thorleif Kristoffersen	Male	Norway	1920
Pierre Chuit	Male	Switzerland	1952
Antonia Churchill	Female	United States	1936
Owen Churchill	Male	United States	1928
Owen Churchill	Male	United States	1932
Owen Churchill	Male	United States	1936
J. Cibert	Male	Argentina	1948
Pedro Cisneros	Male	Cuba	1924
Hugo Clason	Male	Sweden	1912
Karl Classen	Male	Latvia	1928
Bruno Clausen	Male	Denmark	1948
Blair Cochrane	Male	Great Britain	1908
Robert Coleman	Male	Great Britain	1920
Joseph Neild Compton	Male	Great Britain	1936
Frederic Conant	Male	United States	1932
Enrique Conill	Male	Cuba	1924
Renato Cosentino	Male	Italy	1936
William Cooper	Male	United States	1932
William Ian Mccalla Copeland	Male	Canada	1952
Henri Copponex	Male	Switzerland	1948
Henri Copponex	Male	Switzerland	1952
Torleiv Corneliussen	Male	Norway	1912
Émile Cornellie	Male	Belgium	1920
Florimond Cornellie	Male	Belgium	1920
Antonio Cosentino	Male	Italy	1952
Eduardo Aznar Y Coste	Male	Spain	1948
Renato Costentino	Male	Italy	1948
Ralph Cook Craig	Male	United States	1948
Ernest Cribb	Male	Canada	1932
Charles Crichton	Male	Great Britain	1908
Beppe Croce	Male	Italy	1948
Cronier	Male	France	1900
Charles Currey	Male	Great Britain	1952
Lorne Currie	Male	Great Britain	1900
Manfred Curry	Male	United States	1928

== D ==
Olympic sailors by last name: D
Athlete	Gender	Team	Year
Count C. A. D'Alberttis	Male	Italy	1928
Christopher Dahl	Male	Norway	1924
Otto Gunnar Danielsen	Male	Denmark	1936
P. J. Dates	Male	Argentina	1928
Jean-Louis Dauris	Male	France	1952
William Davidson	Male	Great Britain	1908
Pierpont Davis	Male	United States	1932
Emmett Davis	Male	United States	1932
A. de Arana y Churruca	Male	Spain	1928
J. de Arana y Ibarra	Male	Spain	1928
L. de Arana y Uriguen	Male	Spain	1928
M. de Beaumont Bonelli	Male	Italy	1928
Jouët-Pastré De Boulonge	Male	France	1900
Carlos de Cárdenas	Male	Cuba	1948
Carlos de Cárdenas Jr.	Male	Cuba	1948
Jean De Chabanne La Palice	Male	France	1900
Gilbert de Cotignon	Male	France	1900
Carl de la Sablière	Male	France	1928
Willy de l'Arbre	Male	Belgium	1920
J. de Mihálkovics	Male	Hungary	1928
Bernard de Pourtalès	Male	Switzerland	1900
Hélène de Pourtalès	Female	Switzerland	1900
Hermann de Pourtalès	Male	Switzerland	1900
Jean Decazes	Male	France	1900
Knud Degn	Male	Denmark	1924
Alfred Fred Joseph Delany	Male	Ireland	1948
Alfred Fred Joseph Delany	Male	Ireland	1952
Charles Delfosse	Male	Belgium	1948
Louis Depière	Male	Belgium	1920
André Derrien	Male	France	1928
André Maurice Deryckere	Male	Belgium	1952
Claude de Desouches	Male	France	1936
Claude de Desouches	Male	France	1948
Jean d'Estournelles de Constant	Male	France	1900
Christian Dick	Male	Norway	1920
John Dillon	Male	Great Britain	1952
John Ditlev-Simonsen	Male	Norway	1936
Olaf Ditlev-Simonsen	Male	Norway	1936
Hans Dittmar	Male	Finland	1924
Hans Dittmar	Male	Finland	1952
Reginald M. Dixon	Male	Canada	1932
Reginald M. Dixon	Male	Canada	1936
Richard Dixon	Male	Great Britain	1908
Lambertus Doedes	Male	Netherlands	1928
Ansco Jan Heeble Dokkum	Male	Netherlands	1936
Auguste Donny	Male	France	1900
Auguste Dormeuil	Male	France	1900
Aug. Dormeur	Male	France	1900
Carl Dorsey	Male	United States	1932
Carl Dorsey	Male	United States	1936
Doucet	Male	France	1900
Donald Wills Douglas Jr.	Male	United States	1932
Arthur Downes	Male	Great Britain	1908
John Downes	Male	Great Britain	1908
A. Dubos	Male	France	1900
J. Dubos	Male	France	1900
Abraham Everardus Dudok Van Heel	Male	Netherlands	1948
Abraham Everardus Dudok van Heel	Male	Netherlands	1952
Michiel Dudok van Heel	Male	Netherlands	1952
Frederico Duff Burnay	Male	Portugal	1924
Frederico Duff Burnay	Male	Portugal	1928
David Dunlop	Male	Great Britain	1908
Dupland	Male	France	1900
Mantois Dusbosq	Male	France	1900
Shelagh Grosvenor, Duchess of Westminster	Female	Great Britain	1908
Duval	Male	France	1900
Willem Paul van Duyl	Male	Netherlands	1948
Willem Paul van Duyl	Male	Netherlands	1952
Henry Meursinge Duys Jr.	Male	United States	1948
Edward Dyson	Male	Great Britain	1952

== E ==
Olympic sailors by last name: E
Athlete	Gender	Team	Year
C. Edding	Male	Sweden	1948
John Noel Eddy	Male	Great Britain	1936
A. Eiermann	Male	Denmark	1948
Lennart Ekdahl	Male	Sweden	1936
Joseph Ellis-Brown	Male	South Africa	1952
Rupert Ellis-Brown	Male	South Africa	1924
Rupert Ellis-Brown	Male	South Africa	1928
Wolfgang Elsner	Male	Germany	1952
Paul Elvstrøm	Male	Denmark	1948
Paul Elvstrøm	Male	Denmark	1952
Everard Endt	Male	United States	1952
Yngve Engkvist	Male	Sweden	1948
Leif Erichsen	Male	Norway	1920
Filip Ericsson	Male	Sweden	1912
Charles Eriksson	Male	Sweden	1936
Nikolai Ermakov	Male	Soviet Union	1952
Wolfgang Erndl	Male	Austria	1952
Ernst Estlander	Male	Finland	1912
Gustaf Estlander	Male	Finland	1912
Ralph Evans	Male	United States	1948
Anders Evensen	Male	Norway	1948

== F ==
Olympic sailors by last name: F
Athlete	Gender	Team	Year
Eric Fabricius	Male	Finland	1952
Andreas Faehlmann	Male	Estonia	1928
Georg Faehlmann	Male	Estonia	1928
Mario Fafangel	Male	Yugoslavia	1952
Giuseppe Fago	Male	Italy	1936
Gerald Fairhead	Male	Canada	1948
Eilert Falch-Lund	Male	Norway	1908
Eilert Falch-Lund	Male	Norway	1912
Otto Falkenberg	Male	Norway	1920
Børre Falkum-Hansen	Male	Norway	1952
Ph. V. L. Falle	Male	Great Britain	1928
Johan Farber	Male	Russia	1912
Sloane Elmo Farrington	Male	Bahamas	1952
Sloane Elmo Farrington	Male	Great Britain	1948
Johan Faye	Male	Norway	1920
R. Fehlmann	Male	Switzerland	1948
Leslie A. Fenton	Male	Australia	1948
Harald Fereberger	Male	Austria	1952
Finn Ferner	Male	Norway	1952
Johan Ferner	Male	Norway	1952
Andrea Ferrari	Male	Italy	1952
Victório Walter Dos Reis Ferraz	Male	Brazil	1948
André Firmenich	Male	Switzerland	1936
André Firmenich	Male	Switzerland	1948
André Firmenich	Male	Switzerland	1952
Frédéric Firmenich	Male	Switzerland	1936
Georges Firmenich	Male	Switzerland	1936
Paul Elmar Fischer	Male	Germany	1952
Joaquim Fiúza	Male	Portugal	1948
Joaquim Mascarenhas de Fiúza	Male	Portugal	1952
H. Fivas	Male	Switzerland	1928
Werner von Foerster	Male	Argentina	1952
H. G. Fokker	Male	Netherlands	1928
Fred Forsberg	Male	Sweden	1912
Gordon Fowler	Male	Great Britain	1928
Harold Fowler	Male	Great Britain	1924
Allan Franck	Male	Finland	1912
Louis Franck	Male	Belgium	1928
Louis Franck	Male	Belgium	1948
Robert French	Male	Australia	1948
German Julio Frers	Male	Argentina	1936
Kurt Frey	Male	Germany	1936
A. J. J. Fridt	Male	Belgium	1928
Johan Friele	Male	Norway	1920
Norio Fujimura	Male	Japan	1936

== G ==
Olympic sailors by last name: G
Athlete	Gender	Team	Year
Auguste Charles Galeyn	Male	Belgium	1952
Tomás Galfrascoli	Male	Argentina	1952
P. J. de Galindez y Vallejo	Male	Spain	1928
J. Gamenara	Male	Uruguay	1948
Ganthier	Male	France	1900
Charles Speed Garner	Male	United States	1936
Pierre Gaudermen	Male	France	1936
Jean Frain de la Gaulayrie	Male	France	1948
Charles Gaulthier	Male	France	1936
Pierre Gauthier	Male	France	1924
H. R. Gaydon	Male	Great Britain	1928
Per Gedda	Male	Sweden	1936
Per Gedda	Male	Sweden	1952
Louis Gelbert	Male	Switzerland	1936
César Gérico	Male	Argentina	1924
Pierre Gervais	Male	France	1900
Robert Giertsen	Male	Norway	1920
Pieter Jan van der Giessen	Male	Netherlands	1952
Hipólito Ezequiel Gil Elizalde	Male	Argentina	1936
Hipólito Ezequiel Gil Elizalde	Male	Argentina	1948
Willy Gilbert	Male	Norway	1920
F. Giovanelli	Male	Italy	1928
G. Giovanelli	Male	Italy	1928
Robert Girardet	Male	France	1924
Carl Girsén	Male	Finland	1912
Thoralf Glad	Male	Norway	1912
Albert Glandaz	Male	France	1900
Kenneth Glass	Male	Canada	1932
Thomas Glen-Coats	Male	Great Britain	1908
Auguste Godinet	Male	France	1900
Victor Godts	Male	Belgium	1936
Yury Golubev	Male	Soviet Union	1952
E. Gomez	Male	Argentina	1948
Bill Gooderham	Male	Canada	1948
Bill Gooderham	Male	Canada	1952
Cecil Goodricke	Male	South Africa	1932
Peter Gordon	Male	Canada	1932
Pyotr Gorelikov	Male	Soviet Union	1952
Júlio de Sousa Leite Gourinho	Male	Portugal	1948
Alberto Graça	Male	Portugal	1952
Ernest Granier	Male	France	1936
Gilbert Gray	Male	United States	1932
John Gretton, 1st Baron Gretton	Male	Great Britain	1900
Ragnar Gripe	Male	Sweden	1912
Albert Grisar	Male	Belgium	1920
Gunnar Groenblom	Male	Finland	1936
Sven Groenblom	Male	Finland	1936
Keith Leslie Grogono	Male	Great Britain	1936
Torsten Grönfors	Male	Sweden	1912
António Guedes de Herédia	Male	Portugal	1928
António Guedes de Herédia	Male	Portugal	1936
Anthonij Guépin	Male	Denmark	1924
André Guerrier	Male	France	1924
Maurice Gufflet	Male	France	1900
Robert Gufflet	Male	France	1900
Robert Gufflet	Male	France	1928
Charly Guiraist	Male	France	1900
Birger Gustafsson	Male	Sweden	1908
George Gyles	Male	Canada	1932

== H ==
Olympic sailors by last name: H
Athlete	Gender	Team	Year
George H. Brown	Male	Great Britain	1948
Pierre van der Haeghen	Male	Belgium	1948
Edvin Hagberg	Male	Sweden	1908
Edvin Hagberg	Male	Sweden	1912
Harald Hagen	Male	Norway	1924
Emil Hagström	Male	Sweden	1912
Donald Jasper Hains	Male	Canada	1952
Paul Van Halteren	Male	Belgium	1924
Clarence Hammar	Male	Sweden	1924
Karl Hammar	Male	Sweden	1924
Halfdan Hansen	Male	Norway	1912
Halfdan Hansen	Male	Norway	1928
Niels Valdemar Hansen	Male	Denmark	1936
H. V. Hanson	Male	Sweden	1928
Brian G. Hardie	Male	Great Britain	1948
Henry G. Hardie	Male	Great Britain	1948
Ragnar Hargreaves	Male	Norway	1948
Russell Harmer	Male	Great Britain	1936
Erik Hartvall	Male	Finland	1912
Barton Harvey	Male	Australia	1952
Kaspar Hassel	Male	Norway	1920
Émile Hayoit	Male	Belgium	1948
Stig Hedberg	Male	Sweden	1948
Trevor Hedberg	Male	Great Britain	1920
Erik Heiberg	Male	Norway	1952
Omoravica von Heinrich	Male	Hungary	1936
T. Heinrich von Omoravica	Male	Hungary	1928
Arnfinn Heje	Male	Norway	1912
K. Heje	Male	Norway	1948
Frank Hekma	Male	United States	1928
Nicholas Hekma	Male	United States	1928
Georges Hellebuyck	Male	Belgium	1920
Georges Hellebuyck Jr.	Male	Belgium	1948
Rote Fredrik Rafael Hellström	Male	Finland	1948
Carl Hellström	Male	Sweden	1908
Carl Hellström	Male	Sweden	1912
Magnus Hellström	Male	Sweden	1924
Emil Henriques	Male	Sweden	1912
Sigurd Fredrik Herbern	Male	Norway	1936
Jean-Jacques Herbulot	Male	France	1932
Jean-Jacques Herbulot	Male	France	1936
Jean-Jacques Herbulot	Male	France	1948
António Guedes de Herédia	Male	Portugal	1948
Virginie Hériot	Female	France	1928
Georges Herpin	Male	France	1924
Steen Herschend	Male	Denmark	1912
Erik Herseth	Male	Norway	1920
Walter Heuer	Male	Brazil	1936
Bengt Heyman	Male	Sweden	1912
Godfrey Walter Higgs	Male	Bahamas	1952
Cornelis Hin	Male	Netherlands	1920
Frans Hin	Male	Netherlands	1920
Johan Hin	Male	Netherlands	1920
Johan Hin	Male	Netherlands	1924
Martin Hindorff	Male	Sweden	1932
Martin Hindorff	Male	Sweden	1936
Martin Hindorff	Male	Sweden	1948
Martin Hindorff	Male	Sweden	1952
Aatos Martin Hirvisalo	Male	Finland	1948
Thorleif Holbye	Male	Norway	1920
Henry Holdsby Simmonds	Male	Canada	1932
Tore Holm	Male	Sweden	1920
Tore Holm	Male	Sweden	1924
Tore Holm	Male	Sweden	1932
Tore Holm	Male	Sweden	1936
Tore Holm	Male	Sweden	1948
Yngve Holm	Male	Sweden	1920
Erik Johannes Holst	Male	Estonia	1936
Sigurd Holter	Male	Norway	1920
Emilio Homps	Male	Argentina	1948
Johannes van Hoolwerff	Male	Netherlands	1928
Christoffel Hooykaas	Male	Netherlands	1900
Linton Hope	Male	Great Britain	1900
Edward Hore	Male	Great Britain	1900
Leslie Noel Horsfield	Male	South Africa	1952
Muriel Joyce Horton	Female	United States	1952
William Landon Horton Jr.	Male	United States	1952
William Landon Horton Sr.	Male	United States	1952
Edelf Ernesto Hosmann	Male	Argentina	1936
Andreas Howaldt	Male	Germany	1952
Hans Howaldt	Male	Germany	1936
James Howden Hume	Male	Great Britain	1948
James Douglas Howden Hume	Male	Great Britain	1948
Archie Howie	Male	Canada	1952
Aage Høy-Petersen	Male	Denmark	1928
A. Hubner	Male	Germany	1928
John Huettner	Male	United States	1932
Andrew Knatchbull Hugessen	Male	Canada	1952
Alfred Hughes	Male	Great Britain	1908
Frederick Hughes	Male	Great Britain	1908
Charles Hugo	Male	France	1900
P. J. J. Huijbers	Male	Netherlands	1928
C. Huisken	Male	Netherlands	1928
Jarl Hulldén	Male	Finland	1912
Philip Hunloke	Male	Great Britain	1908
Harry A. Hunter	Male	Great Britain	1948
Louis Huybrecht	Male	Belgium	1908
Albert Huybrechts	Male	Belgium	1948
Léon Huybrechts	Male	Belgium	1908
Léon Huybrechts	Male	Belgium	1920
Léon Huybrechts	Male	Belgium	1924
Léon Huybrechts	Male	Belgium	1928
Willy Huybrechts	Male	Belgium	1948
Einar Hvoslef	Male	Norway	1908

== I ==
Olympic sailors by last name: I
Athlete	Gender	Team	Year
Rafael Iglesias	Male	Argentina	1928
Rafael Iglesias	Male	Argentina	1936
Bror-Christian Ilmoni	Male	Finland	1948
Bror-Christian Ilmoni	Male	Finland	1952
Vladimir Ilyevich	Male	Russia	1912
Paul Isberg	Male	Sweden	1912
Svend Valdemar Iversen	Male	Denmark	1948

== J ==
Olympic sailors by last name: J
Athlete	Gender	Team	Year
Egone Jackin	Male	Italy	1952
F. Jackson Jr	Male	United States	1948
Edwin Jacob	Male	Great Britain	1924
Alf Jacobsen	Male	Norway	1920
Peter Jaffe	Male	Great Britain	1932
Gunnar Jamvold	Male	Norway	1920
Peter Jamvold	Male	Norway	1920
Ragnar Rafael Jansson	Male	Finland	1948
Ragnar Rafael Jansson	Male	Finland	1952
Émile Jean-Fontaine	Male	France	1900
Christian Jebe	Male	Norway	1912
H.N. Jefferson	Male	Great Britain	1900
John Jellico	Male	Great Britain	1908
Leon Jensz	Male	Poland	1936
R. Jessup	Male	United States	1948
Frank Baldwin Jr. Jewett	Male	United States	1936
R. Johanny	Male	Austria	1928
Bror Einar Johansson	Male	Finland	1952
Folke Johnson	Male	Sweden	1912
Hugo Johnson	Male	Sweden	1948
Harry Jones	Male	Canada	1932
Koos de Jong	Male	Netherlands	1948
Koos de Jong	Male	Netherlands	1952
Cornelis Willem Jonker	Male	Netherlands	1936
Cornelis Willem Jonker	Male	Netherlands	1948
Jonas Jonsson	Male	Sweden	1908
Jonas Jonsson	Male	Sweden	1912
Alfredo Jorge Ebling Bercht	Male	Brazil	1952
Marc Jousset	Male	France	1900
Claus Juell	Male	Norway	1920
Bertel Juslén	Male	Finland	1912
Sigurd Juslén	Male	Finland	1912

== K ==
Olympic sailors by last name: K
Athlete	Gender	Team	Year
Paal Kaasen	Male	Norway	1920
Hans Karl Gustav Kadelbach	Male	Germany	1952
Daan Kagchelland	Male	Netherlands	1936
Keijiro Kaitoku	Male	Japan	1952
Karl-Gunnar Källström	Male	Finland	1952
Sigurd Kander	Male	Sweden	1912
Vagn Westerberg Kastrup	Male	Denmark	1936
William Patrick Keane Jr.	Male	United States	1936
Philippus Harco Keegstra	Male	Netherlands	1948
Philippus Harco Keegstra	Male	Netherlands	1952
Basil Trevor Kelly	Male	Bahamas	1952
Ludovico Enrique Kempter	Male	Argentina	1952
James Kenion	Male	Great Britain	1908
Neil Aylmer Kennedy-Cochran-Patrick	Male	Great Britain	1952
Hendrik Kersken	Male	Netherlands	1928
Marcel de Kerviler	Male	France	1948
Marcel de Kerviler	Male	France	1952
G. T. Kirby	Male	United States	1928
Walter Kjellberg	Male	Finland	1936
John Klotz	Male	Belgium	1920
John Klotz	Male	Belgium	1924
Durward Knowles	Male	Bahamas	1952
Durward Knowles	Male	Great Britain	1948
Andreas Knudsen	Male	Norway	1920
Karsten Konow	Male	Norway	1936
Magnus Konow	Male	Norway	1908
Magnus Konow	Male	Norway	1912
Magnus Konow	Male	Norway	1920
Magnus Konow	Male	Norway	1928
Magnus Konow	Male	Norway	1936
Magnus Konow	Male	Norway	1948
Jonas Leo Adolf Konto	Male	Finland	1948
Jonas Leo Adolf Konto	Male	Finland	1952
Kirill Kozhevnikov	Male	Soviet Union	1952
Axel Krogius	Male	Finland	1912
Ernst Krogius	Male	Finland	1912
Werner Krogmann	Male	Germany	1936
Werner Krogmann	Male	Germany	1952
Alfried Krupp von Bohlen und Halbach	Male	Germany	1936
A. Krzyzanowski	Male	Poland	1928
Yevgeny Kuhn	Male	Russia	1912
Ventseslav Kuzmichev	Male	Russia	1912

== L ==
Olympic sailors by last name: L
Athlete	Gender	Team	Year
Jean Frain de la Gaulayrie	Male	France	1952
Rufino Rodríguez de la Torre	Male	Argentina	1952
Robert Lacarrière	Male	France	1948
Émile Lachapelle	Male	Switzerland	1948
E. F. Laeisz	Male	Germany	1928
Nils Lamby	Male	Sweden	1912
Paul Heinrich Lange	Male	Germany	1952
Jozef Klemens Langowski	Male	Poland	1936
Alfred Larsen	Male	Norway	1912
Petter Larsen	Male	Norway	1912
Arvid Laurin	Male	Sweden	1936
Jacques Lauwerys	Male	Belgium	1948
Ch.J.F. Laverne	Male	France	1928
Eugène Laverne	Male	France	1900
François Laverne	Male	France	1948
Henri Laverne	Male	France	1900
J. Laverne	Male	France	1948
E. Laverne et Pottier	Male	France	1900
M. Lawrence	Male	Argentina	1948
Gilbert Laws	Male	Great Britain	1908
Jean Le Bret	Male	France	1900
Jacques Le Lavasseur	Male	France	1900
Guy le Mouroux	Male	France	1952
Charles Leaf	Male	Great Britain	1936
Jacques Lebrun	Male	France	1932
Jacques Lebrun	Male	France	1936
Jacques Lebrun	Male	France	1948
Jacques Lebrun	Male	France	1952
Lecointre	Male	France	1900
Cebern Lovell Lee	Male	United States	1948
Legru	Male	France	1900
H. R. Lehbert	Male	Estonia	1928
Leroy	Male	France	1900
André Lesauvage	Male	France	1928
Jean Lesieur	Male	France	1928
Letot	Male	France	1900
Johan Leuchars	Male	Great Britain	1908
Wilfrid Leuchars	Male	Great Britain	1908
Andrew Libano	Male	United States	1932
Sigve Lie	Male	Norway	1948
Sigve Lie	Male	Norway	1952
Jorge Luis Linck	Male	Argentina	1936
Sven Linck	Male	Denmark	1928
G. F. Lindahl	Male	Sweden	1928
Karl Lindblom	Male	Russia	1912
Erland Lindén	Male	Sweden	1912
Emil Lindh	Male	Finland	1912
Erik Lindh	Male	Finland	1912
Erik Lindqvist	Male	Sweden	1912
Y. O. L. Lindqvist	Male	Sweden	1928
Robert Linzeler	Male	France	1900
Jacques Lippens	Male	Belgium	1948
Thomas Littledale	Male	Great Britain	1908
Karl Ljungberg	Male	Sweden	1908
Boris Lobashkov	Male	Soviet Union	1952
Yevgeny Lomach	Male	Russia	1912
Hjalmar Lönnroth	Male	Sweden	1908
Herman Carel Looman	Male	Netherlands	1936
Alfred Loomis	Male	United States	1948
Torsten Lord	Male	Sweden	1936
Torsten Lord	Male	Sweden	1948
Torsten Lord	Male	Sweden	1952
Yves Lorion	Male	France	1948
Henri Louit	Male	France	1924
Carlos Rogenmoser Lourenço	Male	Portugal	1948
Carlos Rogenmoser Lourenço	Male	Portugal	1952
Hans Lubinus	Male	Germany	1936
Hans Lubinus	Male	Germany	1952
Federico De Luca	Male	Italy	1936
Federico De Luca	Male	Italy	1948
Bernhard Lund	Male	Norway	1928
Eugen Lunde	Male	Norway	1924
Peder Lunde	Male	Norway	1952
Vibeke Lunde	Female	Norway	1952
Humbert Lundén	Male	Sweden	1912
Anders Lundgren	Male	Norway	1924
Gösta Lundqvist	Male	Sweden	1920
Lars Lundström	Male	Sweden	1952
Vladimir Lurasov	Male	Russia	1912
Charles Lyon	Male	United States	1932

== M ==
Olympic sailors by last name: M
Athlete	Gender	Team	Year
Bob Maas	Male	Netherlands	1932
Bob Maas	Male	Netherlands	1936
Bob Maas	Male	Netherlands	1948
Bob Maas	Male	Netherlands	1952
Jan Maas	Male	Netherlands	1932
H. Mac Henry	Male	France	1900
William Maitland MacIntosh	Male	Canada	1952
Cecil R. MacIver	Male	Great Britain	1908
Charles MacIver	Male	Great Britain	1908
John Mackenzie	Male	Great Britain	1908
E. Macnally	Male	Ireland	1948
William Maddison	Male	Great Britain	1920
Hans-Hermann Magnussen	Male	Germany	1952
Ella Maillart	Female	Switzerland	1924
Ronald Maitland	Male	Canada	1932
Peter Mangels	Male	Brazil	1952
Luigi De Manincor	Male	Italy	1936
Luigi De Manincor	Male	Italy	1948
Gunnar Månsson	Male	Sweden	1912
Édouard Mantois	Male	France	1900
F. Marcotte	Male	France	1900
Olof Mark	Male	Sweden	1912
Viktor Markov	Male	Russia	1912
René Marstrand la Cour	Male	Denmark	1948
Troels Marstrand la Cour	Male	Denmark	1948
Reidar Martiniuson	Male	Norway	1920
Albert Martin	Male	Great Britain	1908
Leonard Martin	Male	Great Britain	1936
William Martin	Male	France	1900
Arturo Masbové	Male	Spain	1924
Arturo Masbové	Male	Spain	1928
Joaquim Mascarenhas de Fiúza	Male	Portugal	1936
Carlo Masi	Male	Italy	1924
Cencio Massola	Male	Italy	1924
Lars Matton	Male	Sweden	1948
Curt Mattson	Male	Finland	1936
Nikolai Matveev	Male	Soviet Union	1952
Ivan Matveyev	Male	Soviet Union	1952
Algernon Maudslay	Male	Great Britain	1900
Andrey Mazovka	Male	Soviet Union	1952
Arthur William D. McDonald	Male	Great Britain	1948
Basil Herbert McKinney	Male	Bahamas	1952
Paul McLaughlin	Male	Canada	1948
Paul McLaughlin	Male	Canada	1952
Charles McLeod-Robertson	Male	Great Britain	1908
Thomas McMeekin	Male	Great Britain	1908
H. McWilliams	Male	South Africa	1948
Edward Anthohy Melaika	Male	United States	1952
Bengt Melin	Male	Sweden	1948
Bengt Melin	Male	Sweden	1952
Konstantin Meljgunov	Male	Soviet Union	1952
Erik Mellbin	Male	Sweden	1920
S.M. Mellor	Male	Great Britain	1900
Ernest Vieira de Mendonça	Male	Portugal	1936
Marcel Meran	Male	France	1900
S. Merlo	Male	Argentina	1948
F. M. Messerli	Male	Switzerland	1928
Woodbridge Metcalf	Male	United States	1936
Jean Lucien de Meulemeester	Male	Belgium	1952
Hans Meulengracht-Madsen	Male	Denmark	1912
Fredrik Meyer	Male	Norway	1936
Henri Mialaret	Male	France	1900
André Michelet	Male	France	1924
E. Michelet	Male	France	1900
F. Michelet	Male	France	1900
João Miguez Tito	Male	Portugal	1948
Juan Milberg	Male	Argentina	1924
Bernardo Milhas	Male	Argentina	1924
Götz von Mirbach	Male	Germany	1952
Takuo Mitsui	Male	Japan	1936
Wilhelm Moberg	Male	Sweden	1936
Antonios Modinos	Male	Greece	1952
Halvor Møgster	Male	Norway	1920
Eduard Mohr	Male	Germany	1936
Marcel Moisand	Male	France	1900
Georges Mollard	Male	France	1924
Niels Otto Møller	Male	Denmark	1928
Ernst Octavianus Moltzer	Male	Netherlands	1936
Robert Monier	Male	France	1920
Henri Monnot	Male	France	1900
Maurice Monnot	Male	France	1900
Pierre de Montaut	Male	France	1936
Horacio Monti	Male	Argentina	1948
Horacio Monti	Male	Argentina	1952
Arthur James Mooney	Male	Ireland	1948
Michael Mooney	Male	United States	1948
Richard Moore	Male	United States	1932
Domenico Mordini	Male	Italy	1936
Alan Morgan	Male	United States	1932
John Morgan	Male	United States	1952
Hércules Morini	Male	Argentina	1952
F. Morris	Male	United States	1928
Stewart Morris	Male	Great Britain	1948
Carl Mortensen	Male	Norway	1952
E. Moscatelli	Male	Italy	1928
Roberto Moscatelli	Male	Italy	1924
Mousette	Male	France	1900
Édouard Moussié	Male	France	1924
P. Moussié	Male	France	1928
F. Mulder	Male	Belgium	1928
Frank John Murdoch	Male	Great Britain	1952
Lars Skage Musæus	Male	Norway	1948
Harald Musil	Male	Austria	1948
Harald Musil	Male	Austria	1952
Geoff Myburgh	Male	South Africa	1956

== N ==
Olympic sailors by last name: N
Athlete	Gender	Team	Year
Hans Næss	Male	Norway	1920
Leo Nagornoff	Male	Finland	1952
Erich Natusch	Male	Germany	1952
George Naue	Male	Germany	1900
H. de Neve	Male	Belgium	1928
Christian Nielsen	Male	Denmark	1924
Christian Anton Nielsen	Male	Belgium	1952
Ingar Nielsen	Male	Norway	1920
Ingar Nielsen	Male	Norway	1924
Niels Nielsen	Male	Norway	1920
G. Nijbakker	Male	Netherlands	1948
T. Nordio	Male	Italy	1928
Alexandre Noverraz	Male	Switzerland	1936
Louis Noverraz	Male	Switzerland	1948
Louis Noverrez	Male	Switzerland	1952
Georg Nowka	Male	Germany	1952
Herman Nyberg	Male	Sweden	1912
René Israel Nyman	Male	Finland	1936
René Israel Nyman	Male	Finland	1948
René Israel Nyman	Male	Finland	1952
Vaadjuv Nyqvist	Male	Norway	1936

== O ==
Olympic sailors by last name: O
Athlete	Gender	Team	Year
Georg Obermüller	Male	Austria	1948
Horst Obermüller	Male	Austria	1948
Giuliano Oberti	Male	Italy	1928
Giuliano Oberti	Male	Italy	1936
Massimo Oberti	Male	Italy	1928
Massimo Oberti	Male	Italy	1936
Poul Arnold Ohff	Male	Denmark	1952
Carl-Erik Ohlson	Male	Sweden	1952
H.R.H. Crown Prince Olav	Male	Norway	1928
Cid de Oliveira Nascimento	Male	Brazil	1952
C. Olmsted	Male	United States	1928
Kristoffer Olsen	Male	Norway	1920
August Olsson	Male	Sweden	1908
Alfons Olszewski	Male	Poland	1936
Niilo Armas Orama	Male	Finland	1948
Mario Ortiz Sauze	Male	Argentina	1936
Erik Ørvig	Male	Norway	1920
Olaf Ørvig	Male	Norway	1920
Thor Ørvig	Male	Norway	1920
Francisco Antonio Felici Italo Osoldi	Male	Brazil	1952
Henrik Østervold	Male	Norway	1920
Jan Østervold	Male	Norway	1920
Kristian Østervold	Male	Norway	1920
Ole Østervold	Male	Norway	1920
Albert Oswald	Male	Switzerland	1948
W. Outerbridge	Male	United States	1928

== P ==
Olympic sailors by last name: P
Athlete	Gender	Team	Year
Yngve Pacius	Male	Finland	1936
Rainer Aulis Packalén	Male	Finland	1948
Eric Palmgreen	Male	Finland	1948
Pavel Pankrashkin	Male	Soviet Union	1952
Maurice Passelecq	Male	Belgium	1924
Carl C. Paul	Male	United States	1936
Tacariju de Paula	Male	Brazil	1952
L.A.M. Pauly	Male	France	1928
Emmanuel Pauwels	Male	Belgium	1924
Vitezslav Pavlousek	Male	Czechoslovakia	1936
Pavel Pavlov	Male	Russia	1912
H. R. Paxschen	Male	Germany	1928
Aage Pedersen	Male	Denmark	1924
Trygve Pedersen	Male	Norway	1920
Adolf Pekkalainen	Male	Finland	1912
Adelchi Pelaschier	Male	Italy	1952
Guillermo Peralta Ramos	Male	Argentina	1936
Henri Perrissol	Male	France	1948
Robert Perry	Male	Great Britain	1952
Arvid Perslow	Male	Sweden	1912
Nils Persson	Male	Sweden	1912
Heinrich Peters	Male	Germany	1900
Naalli Marius Petersen	Male	Denmark	1948
Henricus Petrus Smulders	Male	Netherlands	1900
Jean Peytel	Male	France	1932
Jean Peytel	Male	France	1936
Jean Peytel	Male	France	1948
Pedro Pi	Male	Spain	1924
J. Piacentini	Male	Argentina	1948
Félix Picon	Male	France	1920
Willy H.A. Pieper	Male	Switzerland	1936
Willy H.A. Pieper	Male	Switzerland	1952
Gerard Piolec	Male	France	1936
Lockwood Masters Pirie	Male	United States	1948
H. J. Pluygers	Male	Netherlands	1928
Nikolay Podgornov	Male	Russia	1912
Enrico Poggi	Male	Italy	1936
Enrico Poggi	Male	Italy	1948
Enrico Poggi	Male	Italy	1952
Luigi Poggi	Male	Italy	1936
Luigi Poggi	Male	Italy	1948
Konstantinos Potamianos	Male	Greece	1948
Louis Potheau	Male	France	1908
Carlos Miguel Benn Pott	Male	Argentina	1952
Stanley Arthur Potter	Male	Great Britain	1952
Beryl Preston	Female	Great Britain	1936
Francis Richard W. Preston	Male	Great Britain	1936
Kenneth Huson Preston	Male	Great Britain	1936
Kenneth Huson Preston	Male	Great Britain	1952
John Wesley Price	Male	United States	1952
Donald Carlton Pritchard	Male	Bahamas	1952
Nikolai Puschnitsky	Male	Russia	1912

== Q ==
Olympic sailors by last name: Q
Athlete	Gender	Team	Year
Mario Gentil Quina	Male	Portugal	1952
Chi Qiang	Male	China	2004

== R ==
Olympic sailors by last name: R
Athlete	Gender	Team	Year
Pierre Rabot	Male	France	1908
Jacques Ranbaud	Male	France	1936
Johan Frederik Rathje	Male	Denmark	1948
George Ratsey	Male	Great Britain	1908
George Colin Ratsey	Male	Great Britain	1932
Timoleon Razelos	Male	Greece	1952
Giovanni Reggio	Male	Italy	1936
Giovanni Reggio	Male	Italy	1948
Marquis G. L. Reggio	Male	Italy	1928
Pietro Reggio	Male	Italy	1952
John S. Reid	Male	United States	1952
Egill Reimers	Male	Norway	1920
H. A. Reuter	Male	Sweden	1928
John Rhodes	Male	Great Britain	1908
R. A. Rhyner	Male	Switzerland	1948
Francis Richards	Male	Great Britain	1920
Wolfgang Edgard Richter	Male	Brazil	1948
Wolfgang Edgard Richter	Male	Brazil	1952
Eric Ridder	Male	United States	1952
Hans Riedl	Male	Austria	1932
Hendrik van Riel	Male	Belgium	1948
Thomas Riggs	Male	Great Britain	1924
Thomas Riggs	Male	Great Britain	1928
Walter Riggs	Male	Great Britain	1924
Carl Ringvold	Male	Norway	1920
Carl Ringvold	Male	Norway	1924
Carl Ringvold Jr.	Male	Norway	1924
Nils Rinman	Male	Sweden	1924
Olle Rinman	Male	Sweden	1924
S. K. F. Rinman	Male	Sweden	1948
Rodolfo Rivademar	Male	Argentina	1948
Frances Rivett-Carnac	Female	Great Britain	1908
Charles Rivett-Carnac	Male	Great Britain	1908
Henrik Robert	Male	Norway	1924
Henrik Robert	Male	Norway	1928
John Robertson	Male	Canada	1948
John Robertson	Male	Canada	1952
Norman Robertson	Male	Canada	1924
E. Rocco de Paula Simoes	Male	Brazil	1948
M. Rocco de Paula Simoes	Male	Brazil	1948
Ingolf Rød	Male	Norway	1920
Nicolò Rode	Male	Italy	1948
Nicolò Rode	Male	Italy	1952
Aleksandr Rodionov	Male	Russia	1912
Rufino Rodrigues de la Torre	Male	Argentina	1936
Philip Rogers	Male	Canada	1932
Willy Van Rompaey	Male	Belgium	1928
Willy Van Rompaey	Male	Belgium	1948
Achille Roncoroni	Male	Italy	1948
Ernest Roney	Male	Great Britain	1924
Ernest Roney	Male	Great Britain	1928
M. H. Roney	Female	Great Britain	1928
Julian Roosevelt	Male	United States	1948
Harry Rosenswärd	Male	Sweden	1912
J. Rossler-Orovsky	Male	Czechoslovakia	1928
Rossollin	Male	France	1900
Édouard Alphonse James de Rothschild	Male	France	1900
Philippe de Rothschild	Male	France	1928
J. P. Rouanet	Male	France	1928
Jean Marie Pierre Roux-Delimal	Male	France	1952
B. E. Ruys	Male	Netherlands	1928
Axel Rydin	Male	Sweden	1920

== S ==
Olympic sailors by last name: S
Athlete	Gender	Team	Year
Antonio Saav	Male	Cuba	1924
Émile Sacré	Male	France	1900
C. A. Sáez	Male	Uruguay	1948
Jorge del Río Sálas	Male	Argentina	1952
Dario Salata	Male	Italy	1948
Dario Salata	Male	Italy	1952
Dagmar Salén	Male	Sweden	1936
Gösta Salén	Male	Sweden	1948
Sven Salén	Male	Sweden	1936
Sven Salén	Male	Sweden	1952
Henrique Reis Goucho Sallaty	Male	Portugal	1948
Richard Sällström	Male	Sweden	1912
Jens Salvesen	Male	Norway	1920
Jens Salvesen	Male	Norway	1928
Eric Sandberg	Male	Sweden	1908
Eric Sandberg	Male	Sweden	1912
Harald Sandberg	Male	Sweden	1912
Carl Sandblom	Male	Sweden	1924
John Sandblom	Male	Sweden	1924
L. Ch. Sandblom	Female	Sweden	1924
Philip Sandblom	Male	Sweden	1924
Eino Sandelin	Male	Finland	1912
Torsten Sandelin	Male	Finland	1912
Riccardo De Sangro Fondi	Male	Italy	1936
Eugenio Lauz Santurio	Male	Uruguay	1936
Eugenio Lauz Santurio	Male	Uruguay	1952
Rickard Sarby	Male	Sweden	1948
Rickard Sarby	Male	Sweden	1952
Hans Schachinger	Male	Austria	1948
H. W. Schalkwijk	Male	Netherlands	1928
Felix Scheder-Bieschin	Male	Germany	1936
Henri Schelcher	Male	France	1936
Finn Schiander	Male	Norway	1920
Niels Schibbye	Male	Denmark	1936
E. Schiottz	Male	Denmark	1948
Halfdan Schjøtt	Male	Norway	1920
Trygve Schjøtt	Male	Norway	1920
Ferdinand Schlatter	Male	France	1900
Peter Schlütter	Male	Denmark	1928
Lauritz Schmidt	Male	Norway	1920
Lauritz Schmidt	Male	Norway	1936
Michael Schoettle	Male	United States	1952
Iosif Schomaker	Male	Russia	1912
W. Schouten	Male	Netherlands	1928
Markus Schurch	Male	Switzerland	1952
Peter Scott	Male	Great Britain	1936
A. Sebök	Male	Hungary	1928
Horacio Seeber	Male	Argentina	1928
Arne Sejersted	Male	Norway	1920
George Sémichon	Male	France	1900
Carlos Serantes Saavedra	Male	Argentina	1928
Martin Sharp	Male	Great Britain	1952
Fyodor Shutko	Male	Soviet Union	1952
Julio Sieburger	Male	Argentina	1936
Julio Sieburger	Male	Argentina	1948
Roberto Sieburger	Male	Argentina	1948
Roberto Sieburger	Male	Argentina	1952
Enrique Sieburger Jr.	Male	Argentina	1948
Enrique Sieburger Sr.	Male	Argentina	1948
Enrique Sieburger Sr.	Male	Argentina	1952
Félix Sienra Castellanos	Male	Uruguay	1948
Juliusz Wladyslaw Sieradzki	Male	Poland	1936
Victor Henri de Sigaldi	Male	Monaco	1952
Hilding Silander	Male	Finland	1936
Johan Silén	Male	Finland	1912
Paul Leonard Sjöberg	Male	Finland	1952
Karl-Einar Sjögren	Male	Sweden	1908
Fritz Sjöqvist	Male	Sweden	1912
Johan Sjöqvist	Male	Sweden	1912
Morits Skaugen	Male	Norway	1948
Morits Skaugen	Male	Norway	1952
TH. G. Skinner	Male	Great Britain	1928
Hilary Smart	Male	United States	1948
Paul Smart	Male	United States	1948
Charles Smith	Male	United States	1932
Frank Smith	Male	Great Britain	1908
James Smith	Male	United States	1948
A. H. Snyders	Male	Belgium	1928
Arent Van Soelen	Male	South Africa	1932
Håkon Solem	Male	Norway	1948
Thomas Vivian Somers	Male	Great Britain	1952
Hans Aurelius Sorensen	Male	Denmark	1948
Ole Sørensen	Male	Norway	1920
Júlio De Sousa Leite Gourinho	Male	Portugal	1952
Livio Spanghero	Male	Italy	1948
John Spence	Male	Great Britain	1908
Giusto Spigno	Male	Italy	1952
Carlo Maria Spirito	Male	Italy	1952
Johan Erik Stadigh	Male	Finland	1952
G. A. van der Stadt	Male	Netherlands	1928
Christian Staib	Male	Norway	1912
Giovanni Stampa	Male	Italy	1936
Léopold Standaert	Male	Belgium	1920
Léopold Standaert	Male	Belgium	1924
Hellmut Wilhelm E. Stauch	Male	South Africa	1952
Cornelis van Staveren	Male	Netherlands	1928
Robert Steele	Male	Great Britain	1936
Robert Steele	Male	Great Britain	1952
Rolf Steffenburg	Male	Sweden	1920
Hagbart Steffens	Male	Norway	1908
Gunnar Stenbäck	Male	Finland	1912
Ragnar Stenbaeck	Male	Finland	1936
Charles Stern	Male	Switzerland	1948
Charles Stern	Male	Switzerland	1952
Marcel Stern	Male	Switzerland	1948
Marcel Stern	Male	Switzerland	1952
William Eric H. Strain	Male	Great Britain	1948
Philipp Strauch	Male	Russia	1912
Agostino Straulino	Male	Italy	1948
Agostino Straulino	Male	Italy	1952
Hans Struksnæs	Male	Norway	1936
Jock Sturrock	Male	Australia	1948
Jock Sturrock	Male	Australia	1952
Eddy Stutterheim	Male	Netherlands	1948
Eddy Stutterheim	Male	Netherlands	1952
David Sullivan	Male	Ireland	1948
Gustaf Oscar Sumelius	Male	Finland	1936
Helger Rafael Sumkus	Male	Finland	1936
Daniel Sundén-Cullberg	Male	Sweden	1932
A. Suner	Male	Argentina	1948
Susse	Male	France	1900
Robert Sutton	Male	United States	1932
Robert Sutton	Male	United States	1936
Henry Sutton	Male	Great Britain	1908
Gustaf Svensson	Male	Sweden	1920
Ragnar Svensson	Male	Sweden	1920

== T ==
Olympic sailors by last name: T
Athlete	Gender	Team	Year
Gerald Tait	Male	Great Britain	1908
Minoru Takarabe	Male	Japan	1936
Bertil Tallberg	Male	Finland	1912
Gunnar Tallberg	Male	Finland	1912
Count G. Tarsis	Male	Italy	1928
Howard Taylor	Male	Great Britain	1900
Hugo Tedín Uriburu	Male	Argentina	1928
Léon Tellier	Male	France	1900
Georg Tengwall	Male	Sweden	1920
Jacob Tullin Thams	Male	Norway	1936
Carl Thaulow	Male	Norway	1912
Alvar Thiel	Male	Sweden	1912
Hans Tholstrup	Male	Denmark	1936
Nils Thomas	Male	Norway	1920
Oivind Thommessen	Male	Norway	1948
J. Thompson	Male	United States	1928
O. H. Thomsen	Male	Germany	1928
Sven Thomsen	Male	Denmark	1912
Theodor Thomsen	Male	Germany	1936
Theodor Thomsen	Male	Germany	1952
Sven Thorell	Male	Sweden	1928
Sven Thorell	Male	Sweden	1932
Edmund Thormählen	Male	Sweden	1908
Thor Thorvaldsen	Male	Norway	1936
Thor Thorvaldsen	Male	Norway	1948
Thor Thorvaldsen	Male	Norway	1952
Amédée Thubé	Male	France	1912
Gaston Thubé	Male	France	1912
Jacques Thubé	Male	France	1912
João Miguez Tito	Male	Portugal	1952
Einar Torgersen	Male	Norway	1920
Rufino Rodríguez de la Torre	Male	Argentina	1948
Owen Cates Torrey, Jr	Male	United States	1948
Wilhelm Törsleff	Male	Sweden	1924
Dick Townsend	Male	Canada	1948
Silvio Treleani	Male	Italy	1932
Ralph Tschudi	Male	Norway	1920
Aleksandr Tshumakov	Male	Soviet Union	1952
Demir Turgut	Male	Turkey	1936
Rolf Fredrik Turkka	Male	Finland	1948
Rolf Fredrik Turkka	Male	Finland	1952
N. Tuss	Male	Hungary	1928
Alf Tveten	Male	Norway	1936
Donald Milne Tytler	Male	Canada	1952

== U ==
Olympic sailors by last name: U
Athlete	Gender	Team	Year
R. Uhl	Male	Hungary	1928
Harun Ülman	Male	Turkey	1936
Valo Urho	Male	Finland	1948
Mario Uriburu	Male	Argentina	1924

== V ==
Olympic sailors by last name: V
Athlete	Gender	Team	Year
Willy Valcke	Male	Belgium	1920
Alfredo Vallebona	Male	Argentina	1952
Jules Valton	Male	France	1900
Victor Vanderslyen	Male	Belgium	1924
Nikolai Vekšin	Male	Estonia	1928
Arie van der Velden	Male	Netherlands	1900
F. Verkade	Male	Netherlands	1928
Vilhelm Vett	Male	Denmark	1924
Vilhelm Vett	Male	Denmark	1928
E. Vieira de Mendonça	Male	Portugal	1928
Ragnar Vik	Male	Norway	1920
F. Vilamitjana	Male	France	1900
C. Vink	Male	Netherlands	1948
Nikolaos Vlangalis	Male	Greece	1948
Eberhard Vogdt	Male	Estonia	1928
Rodolfo Albino Vollenweider	Male	Argentina	1952
Giuseppe Volpi	Male	Italy	1936
Albert Vos	Male	Belgium	1936
Jan Vreede	Male	Denmark	1924
Gerard de Vries Lentsch	Male	Netherlands	1928
Willem de Vries Lentsch	Male	Netherlands	1928
Willem de Vries Lentsch	Male	Netherlands	1936
Willem de Vries Lentsch, Jr	Male	Netherlands	1948

== W ==
Olympic sailors by last name: W
Athlete	Gender	Team	Year
Otto Wachs	Male	Germany	1936
Tellef Wagle	Male	Norway	1920
Harry Wahl	Male	Finland	1912
Hubert Wallace	Male	Canada	1932
James P. Wallace	Male	Great Britain	1948
John Wallace	Male	United States	1936
Nordahl Wallem	Male	Norway	1936
Marcus Wallenberg	Male	Sweden	1936
Uno Wallentin	Male	Sweden	1936
Erik Waller	Male	Sweden	1912
Erik Wallerius	Male	Sweden	1908
Erik Wallerius	Male	Sweden	1912
Harald Wallin	Male	Sweden	1908
Harald Wallin	Male	Sweden	1912
Olof Wallin	Male	Finland	1936
William Ward	Male	Great Britain	1908
Georges Warenhorst	Male	France	1900
Folke Wassén	Male	Sweden	1952
Magnus Wassén	Male	Sweden	1952
William Glenn Waterhouse	Male	United States	1936
Thomas Webster	Male	United States	1932
Haimar Wedemeyer	Male	Germany	1936
James Weekes	Male	United States	1948
Henri Weewauters	Male	Belgium	1908
Henri Weewauters	Male	Belgium	1920
Albert Weil	Male	France	1920
Hans-Joachim Weise	Male	Germany	1936
Ottokar Weise	Male	Germany	1900
Ottokar Weise	Male	Germany	1900
William Rupert Welply	Male	Great Britain	1936
C. H. Wentzel	Male	Germany	1928
G. Werner	Male	Austria	1948
Petrus Wernink	Male	Netherlands	1920
Bo Westerberg	Male	Sweden	1936
Ernst Theodor Westerlund	Male	Finland	1952
Ernst Theodor Westerlund	Male	Finland	1948
Herbert Westermark	Male	Sweden	1912
Nils Westermark	Male	Sweden	1912
Georg Westling	Male	Finland	1912
Ben Weston	Male	United States	1928
Edgar White	Male	United States	1952
Sumner White	Male	United States	1952
Emelyn Whiton	Female	United States	1952
Herman Whiton	Male	United States	1928
Herman Whiton	Male	United States	1948
Herman Whiton	Male	United States	1952
Erich Wichmann-Harbeck	Male	Chile	1936
Christen Wiese	Male	Norway	1920
Paul Wiesner	Male	Germany	1900
Wilhelm Wilhelmsen Jr.	Male	Norway	1928
E. William Exshaw	Male	Great Britain	1900
Frederick Williams Shick	Male	United States	1936
Kevin Robert Wilson	Male	Australia	1952
Gerald Wilson	Male	Canada	1932
Lars Winqvist	Male	Finland	1936
R. Winter	Male	Czechoslovakia	1928
William von Wirén	Male	Estonia	1928
Maarten de Wit	Male	Netherlands	1928
A. Wolff	Male	Poland	1928
Arthur Wood	Male	Great Britain	1908
Franklin Ratsey Woodroffe	Male	Great Britain	1952
John Douglas Woodward	Male	Canada	1952
Bevan James Worcester	Male	Australia	1952
Cyril Wright	Male	Great Britain	1920
Dorothy Wright	Female	Great Britain	1920
Claus Eckbert Wunderlich	Male	Germany	1952
Henry E. Wylie	Male	Canada	1932

== Z ==
Olympic sailors by last name: Z
Athlete	Gender	Team	Year
Janusz Rajmund Zalewski	Male	Poland	1936
Stanislaw Zalewski	Male	Poland	1936
Andreas Ziro	Male	Greece	1952

== See also ==
- List of 49er class sailors at the Summer Olympics
- List of Star class sailors at the Summer Olympics
