= Sailing at the 1952 Summer Olympics – Dragon =

Sailing at the Olympics

Dragon at the Games of the XV Olympiad
- Medalists
- Venue: Harmaja
- Dates: 20–28 July
- Competitors: 51 from 17 nations
- Teams: 17

Medalists
| 1st place, gold medalist(s) | | Thor Thorvaldsen; Sigve Lie; Håkon Barfod | Norway |
| 2nd place, silver medalist(s) | | Per Gedda; Sidney Boldt-Christmas; Erland Almqvist | Sweden |
| 3rd place, bronze medalist(s) | | Theodor Thomsen; Erich Natusch; Georg Nowka | Germany |

The Dragon was a sailing event on the Sailing at the 1952 Summer Olympics program in Harmaja. Seven races were scheduled. 51 sailors, on 17 boats, from 17 nations competed.

== Results ==
| Rank | Helmsman (Country) | Crew | Yachtname | Race I | | Race II | | Race III | | Race IV | | Race V | | Race VI | | Race VII | | Total Points | Total -1 |
| Rank | Helmsman (Country) | Crew | Yachtname | Rank | Points | Rank | Points | Rank | Points | Rank | Points | Rank | Points | Rank | Points | Rank | Points | Total Points | Total -1 |
|---|---|---|---|---|---|---|---|---|---|---|---|---|---|---|---|---|---|---|---|
| 1st place, gold medalist(s) | Thor Thorvaldsen (NOR) | Sigve Lie; Håkon Barfod | Pan | 2 | 1030 | 1 | 1331 | ~~9~~ | ~~377~~ | 1 | 1331 | 6 | 553 | 6 | 553 | 1 | 1331 | 6506 | 6129 |
| 2nd place, silver medalist(s) | Per Gedda (SWE) | Sidney Boldt-Christmas; Erland Almqvist | Tornado | ~~5~~ | ~~632~~ | 3 | 854 | 3 | 854 | 2 | 1030 | 5 | 632 | 1 | 1331 | 3 | 854 | 6187 | 5555 |
| 3rd place, bronze medalist(s) | Theodor Thomsen (GER) | Erich Natusch; Georg Nowka | Gustel X | 4 | 729 | ~~8~~ | ~~428~~ | 6 | 553 | 3 | 854 | 1 | 1331 | 3 | 854 | 2 | 1030 | 5779 | 5351 |
| 4 | Roberto Sieburger (ARG) | Jorge del Río Sálas; Horacio Campi | Pampero | ~~7~~ | ~~486~~ | 2 | 1030 | 2 | 1030 | 4 | 729 | 2 | 1030 | 2 | 1030 | 7 | 486 | 5821 | 5335 |
| 5 | Ole Berntsen (DEN) | William Berntsen; Aage Birch | Snude | 3 | 854 | 7 | 486 | 1 | 1331 | 5 | 632 | 4 | 729 | 8 | 428 | ~~17~~ | ~~101~~ | 4561 | 4460 |
| 6 | Wim van Duyl (NED) | Biem Dudok van Heel; Michiel Dudok van Heel | Thalatta | 1 | 1331 | 9 | 377 | ~~DSQ~~ | ~~0~~ | 7 | 486 | 7 | 486 | 5 | 632 | 4 | 729 | 4041 | 4041 |
| 7 | Wolfgang Edgard Richter (BRA) | Peter Mangels; Francisco Isoldi | Escapade | 12 | 252 | 4 | 729 | 11 | 290 | 6 | 553 | 10 | 331 | 4 | 729 | ~~15~~ | ~~155~~ | 3039 | 2884 |
| 8 | João Tito (POR) | Carlos Lourenço; Alberto Graça | Alcaid | 6 | 553 | ~~11~~ | ~~290~~ | 12 | 252 | 9 | 377 | 3 | 854 | 10 | 331 | 9 | 377 | 3034 | 2782 |
| 9 | Giuseppe Carattino (ITA) | Carlo Spirito; Antonio Carattino | Galatea II | 9 | 377 | 5 | 632 | 14 | 185 | 8 | 428 | 14 | 185 | ~~16~~ | ~~127~~ | 5 | 632 | 2566 | 2439 |
| 10 | John Robertson (CAN) | Donald Hains; Archibald Howie | Jet | 8 | 428 | 12 | 252 | 4 | 729 | 11 | 290 | ~~15~~ | ~~155~~ | 12 | 252 | 12 | 252 | 2358 | 2203 |
| 11 | William Horton Sr. (USA) | Joyce Horton; William Horton Jr. | Skidoo | ~~17~~ | ~~101~~ | 6 | 553 | 10 | 331 | 15 | 155 | 13 | 218 | 7 | 486 | 8 | 428 | 2272 | 2171 |
| 12 | Jock Sturrock (AUS) | Douglas Buxton; Bevan Worcester | Vinha | 10 | 331 | ~~14~~ | ~~185~~ | 5 | 632 | 10 | 331 | 12 | 252 | 14 | 185 | 14 | 185 | 2101 | 1916 |
| 13 | Thomas Somers (GBR) | Edward Dyson; John Barrington-Ward | Sabre | 15 | 155 | ~~17~~ | ~~101~~ | 8 | 428 | 13 | 218 | 9 | 377 | 9 | 377 | 10 | 331 | 1987 | 1886 |
| 14 | Eric Fabricius (FIN) | Bror Johansson; Leo Nagornoff | Tu-Fri | 13 | 218 | 10 | 331 | ~~15~~ | ~~155~~ | 14 | 185 | 11 | 290 | 11 | 290 | 6 | 553 | 2022 | 1867 |
| 15 | Ivan Matveyev (URS) | Yury Golubev; Andrey Mazovka | Korshun | 16 | 127 | 15 | 155 | 7 | 486 | ~~17~~ | ~~101~~ | 8 | 428 | 13 | 218 | 11 | 290 | 1805 | 1704 |
| 16 | Marcel de Kerviler (FRA) | Jean Frain de la Gaulayrie; Guy le Mouroux | Virginie | 11 | 290 | 16 | 127 | ~~DSQ~~ | ~~0~~ | 12 | 252 | 16 | 127 | 15 | 155 | 16 | 127 | 1078 | 1078 |
| 17 | Jean De Meulemeester (BEL) | André Deryckére; Auguste Galeyn | Girl Pat | 14 | 185 | 13 | 218 | 13 | 218 | 16 | 127 | ~~17~~ | ~~101~~ | 17 | 101 | 13 | 218 | 1168 | 1067 |

DNF = Did not finish, DNS= Did not start, DSQ = Disqualified
= Male, = Female

=== Daily standings ===
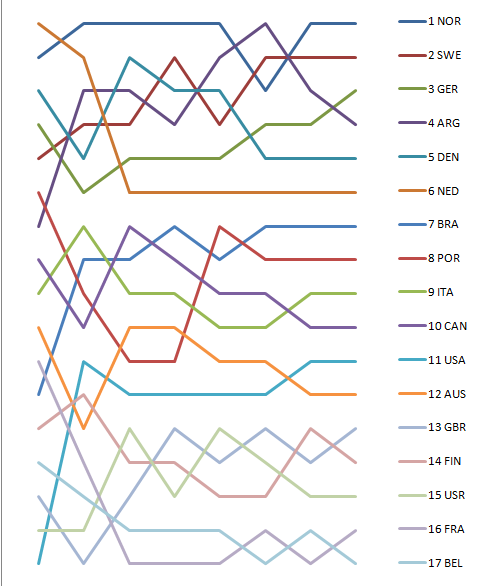
Graph showing the daily standings in the Dragon during the 1952 Summer Olympics

== Conditions at Harmaja ==
Of the total of three race area's only two were needed during the Olympics in Harmaja. Each of the classes was using the same scoring system.

| Date | Race | Sky | Wind direction | Wind speed (m/s) |
|---|---|---|---|---|
| 20 July 1952 | I | Grand yachting weather | SW | 6-7 |
| 21 July 1952 | II | Calm sea, later rain | SW | 1-2 later 6-7 |
| 22 July 1952 | III | Magnificent seas | SW | 10 |
| 23 July 1952 | IV | | Shifty | 3-4 |
| 26 July 1952 | V | Rainy | SW | 3-6 |
| 27 July 1952 | VI | | SW | 4-6 |
| 28 July 1952 | VII | Fine and sunny | Shifty | Light |
