= Ratsey =

Ratsey may refer to:

- George Ernest Ratsey (1875–1942), British sailor who competed in the 1908 Summer Olympics
- George Colin Ratsey (1906–1984), British sailor and sail maker
- Ratsey and Lapthorn, sail maker
