= Carattino =

Carattino is an Italian surname. Notable people with the surname include:

- Antonio Carattino (1923–2024), Italian sailor
- Domenico Carattino (1920–2004), Italian sailor
- Giuseppe Carattino (1919–2014), Italian sailor
