= De Meulemeester =

De Meulemeester is a surname. Notable people with the surname include:

- Adolphe De Meulemeester (1870–1944), Belgian soldier and colonial administrator
- André de Meulemeester (1894–1973), Belgian pilot
- Ilse De Meulemeester (born 1971), Belgian model
- Ingeborg De Meulemeester (born 1965), Belgian politician
- Jean De Meulemeester (1922–1970), Belgian sailor
- Madeleine De Meulemeester (1904–1996), Belgian lawyer
- Michel De Meulemeester (1943–2000), Belgian rower
- Sebastien De Meulemeester (born 1998), Belgian swimmer

== See also ==
- Ann Demeulemeester, professional name of Ann Verhelst, Belgian fashion designer
