= Thomas Somers =

Thomas Somers can refer to:

- Thomas Somers (athlete) (born 1997), British sprinter
- Thomas Somers (investor), American investor
- Thomas Somers (sailor) (1909–1984), British Olympic sailor
