= Álvaro Alonso =

Álvaro Alonso may refer to:

- Álvaro Alonso Ortega (born 2004), Spanish sailor
- Álvaro Alonso (cyclist) (born 1985), Spanish track cyclist
- Alvaro Alonso Barba (1569–?), Catholic priest and metallurgist
