= Arthur Money =

Arthur Money may refer to:

- Arthur L. Money, American engineer and government
- Arthur Wigram Money (1866–1951), British Army officer

== See also ==
- Arthur Mooney (disambiguation)
