= Spigno =

Spigno may refer to the following comuni in Italy:

- Spigno Monferrato, in Piedmont
- Spigno Saturnia, in the Lazio
- Giusto Spigno (1916 –1982), Italian sailor
