= JUC =

JUC or juc can refer to:

== Organizations and companies ==
- Juba Air Cargo, a now-defunct airline from Sudan from 1996 to 2008
- Joint University Council of the Applied Social Sciences, a British learned society for social science and administration
- Jeunesse Universitaire Catholique féminine, an organization founded by Belgian scout and lawyer Madeleine De Meulemeester
- Japan Unicycle Club, a club founded by Jack Halpern (linguist)

== Schools and universities ==
- Jerusalem University College, a theological school in Jerusalem, Israel/Palestine
- University College of Jubail, a university in Jubail, Saudi Arabia
- Ja-Ela Urban Council, a local authority in Ja-Ela, Sri Lanka
- Jesselton University College, a university in Kota Kinabalu, Malaysia; see List of universities in Malaysia
- Jayee University College, a university in Jayee, Ghana; see List of universities in Ghana

== Other uses ==
- Jurchen language, the 12th and 13th century ancestor of the Manchu language of China, by ISO 639 code
- Jalandhar City Junction railway station, a train station near Jalandhar, Pakistan
- Juc, a commune in Romania
- Victor Juc, a political scientist on the Commission for the Study of the Communist Dictatorship in Moldova
