= Yury Golubev =

Soviet sailor

Personal information
- Nationality: Soviet
- Born: 17 February [O.S. 6 February] 1906 Kirillov, Novgorod Governorate, Russian Empire
- Died: 19 March 1984 Leningrad, Soviet Union

Sport
- Sport: Sailing

Yury Golubev (17 February [O.S. 6 February] 1906 — 19 March 1984) was a Soviet sailor. He competed in the Dragon event at the 1952 Summer Olympics, with Ivan Matveyev and Andrey Mazovka.

Golubev died in 1984 in Leningrad.
