= Álvaro Alonso Ortega =

Spanish sailor

Álvaro Alonso
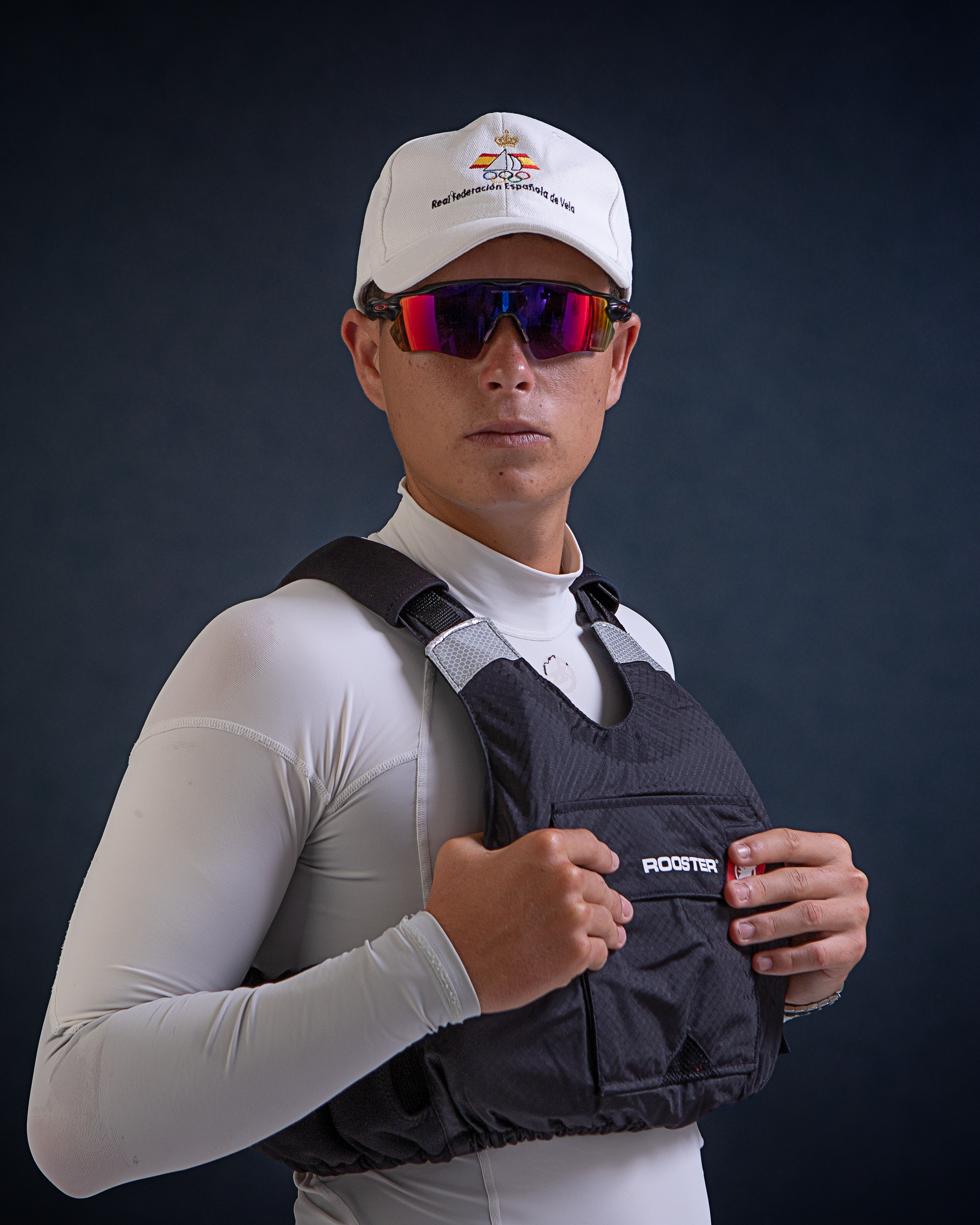
- Álvaro Alonso in 2025

Personal information
- Born: Álvaro Alonso Ortega; 25 August 2004 (age 22) Las Palmas, Gran Canaria
- Occupation: Sailor
- Height: 182 cm (6 ft 0 in)
- Weight: 78 kg (172 lb)

Signature
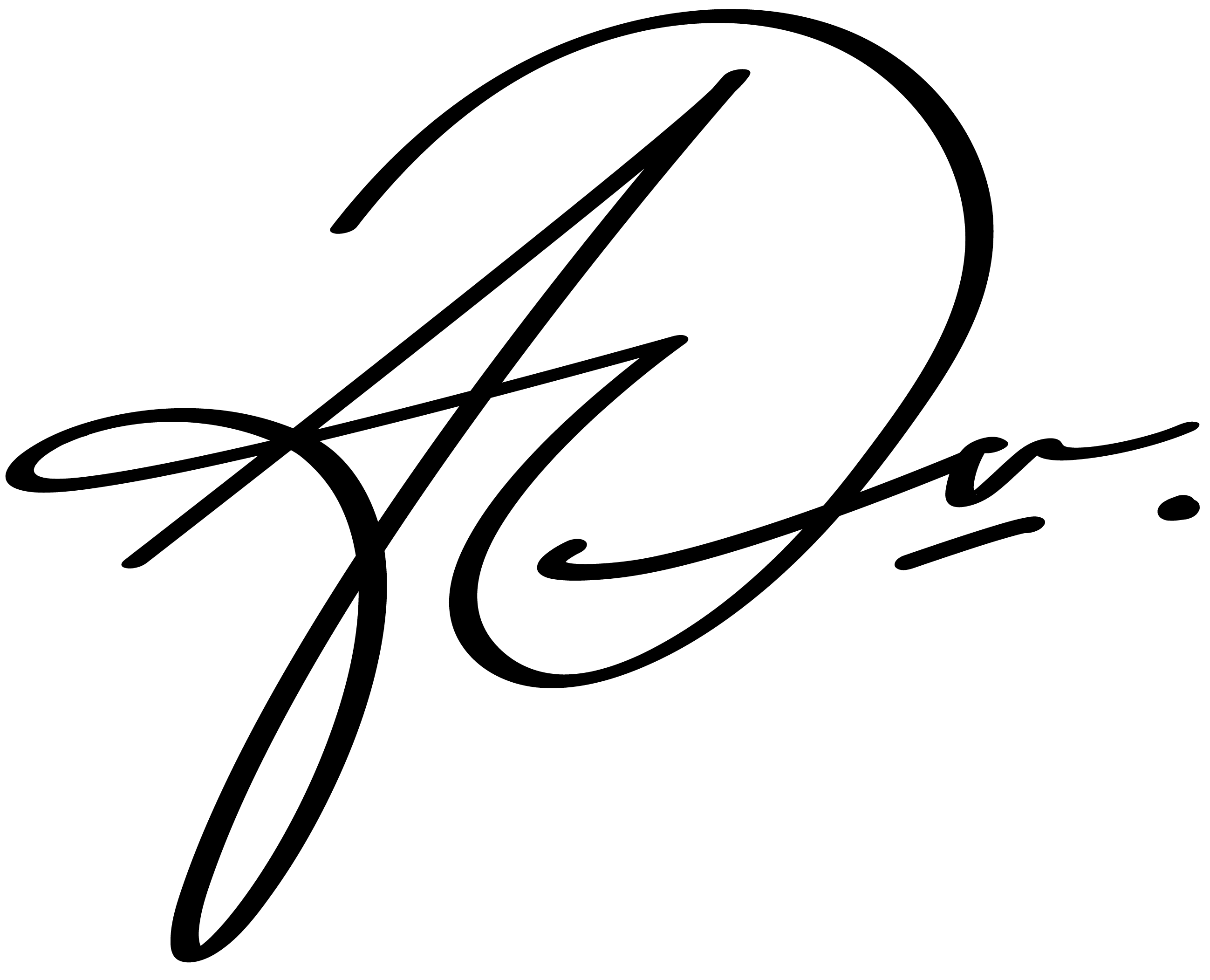

Sailing career
- Sport: Sailing
- Club: Royal Gran Canaria Yacht Club
- Coached by: Aarón Sarmiento; Andrés Barrio
- Class: Dinghy

Álvaro Alonso Ortega (born 25 August 2004 in Las Palmas, Gran Canaria) is a Spanish sailor who competes for the Royal Gran Canaria Yacht Club. He is a two-time Spanish national champion in the 29er class and placed fifth at the 2022 29er World Championship.

== Education ==
Alonso completed a Bachelor's degree in Artificial Intelligence and Data Engineering at the Complutense University of Madrid.

He is currently pursuing a Master of Science in Technology Management at Columbia University, where he received a Dean's Fellowship.

== Sailing career ==
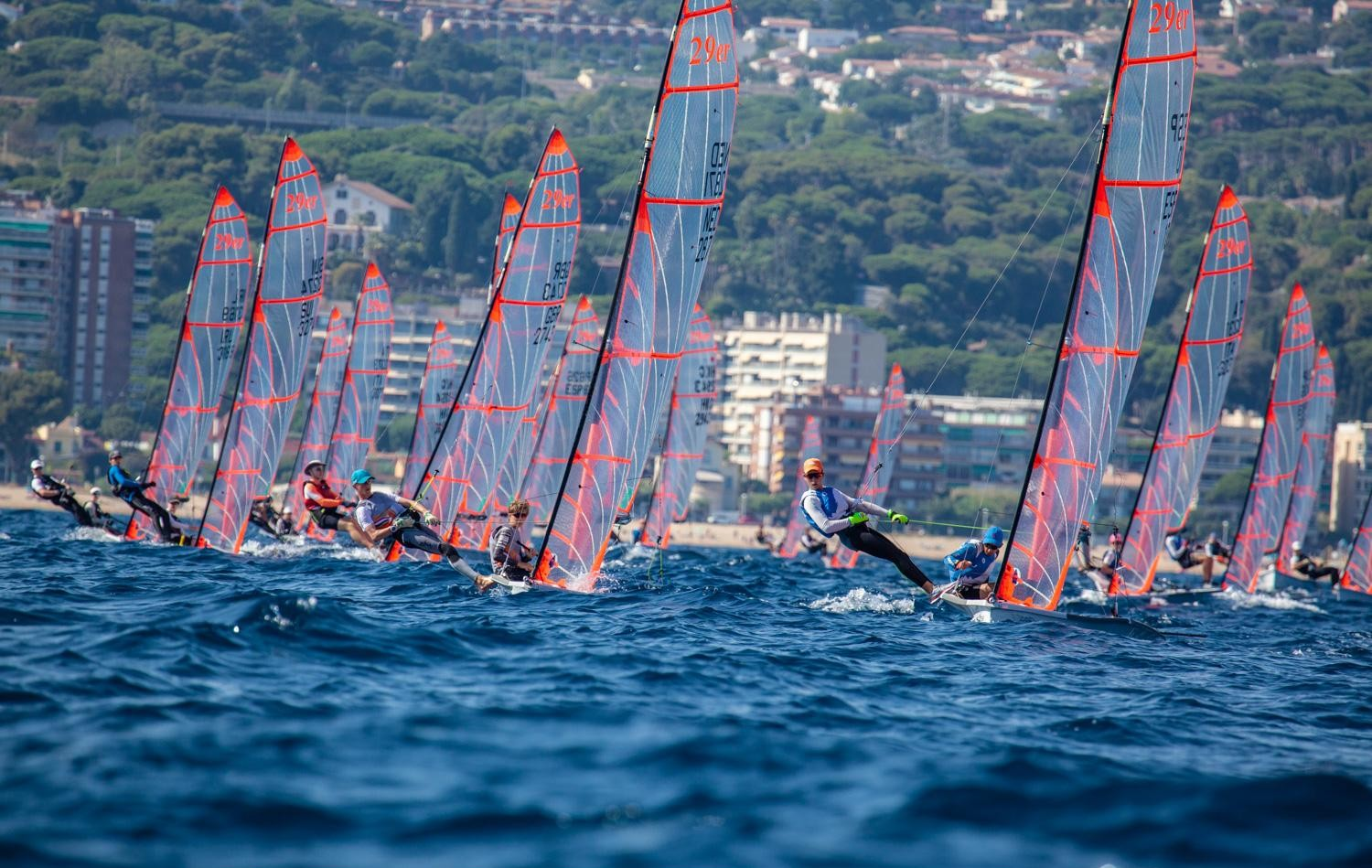
Álvaro Alonso Ortega at the 29er World Championship

He began sailing at the age of seven with the Club de Regatas Suroeste de Mogán in the Canary Islands.

Between 2015 and 2017, he won several local and regional Optimist regattas before joining the Royal Gran Canaria Yacht Club, where he continues to compete. In 2017, he finished fourth in Spain's national selection series, earning qualification for the Optimist World Championship in Pattaya, Thailand.

In mid-2019, he transitioned to the two-person 29er skiff, training under Olympic sailors Aarón Sarmiento and Andrés Barrio. That same year, he finished runner-up in the absolute category at the 2019 Spanish National Championship. He subsequently won two national titles, thereby qualifying to represent Spain at the ISAF Youth Sailing World Championships.

In 2021, he was recognised as a Spanish High-Level Athlete (DAN) by the High Council for Sports (Spanish: Consejo Superior de Deportes, CSD), following his tenth-place finish at the 29er World Championship.

In 2022, Alonso led the overall standings at the 29er World Championship for several days before finishing fifth, and also placed sixth at the 29er European Championship.
