= William Horton Sr. =

American sailor

Personal information
- Born: December 18, 1909 Los Angeles, California, United States
- Died: June 26, 1973 (aged 63) San Clemente, California, United States

Sport
- Sport: Sailing

William Horton Sr. (December 18, 1909 – June 26, 1973) was an American sailor. He competed in the Dragon event at the 1952 Summer Olympics.
