= William Horton Jr. =

American sailor

Personal information
- Born: May 25, 1939 (age 87) Los Angeles, California, United States

Sport
- Sport: Sailing

William Horton Jr. (born May 25, 1939) is an American sailor. He competed in the Dragon event at the 1952 Summer Olympics.
