= 18 foot dinghy =

Olympic sailing class

Development
- Designer: G.L. Watson & Co.
- Year: 1919
- Name: 18 foot dinghy

Boat
- Crew: 2
- Draft: 2.5 ft (0.76 m)

Hull
- Type: Dinghy
- Hull weight: 2,750 lb (1,250 kg)
- LOA: 24.5 ft (7.5 m)
- LWL: 18 ft (5.5 m)
- Beam: 6 ft (1.8 m)

Hull appendages
- Keel: Fixed + Centerboard 1,200 lb (540 kg)

Rig
- Rig type: Bermuda rig

Sails
- Upwind sail area: 306 ft^{2} (28.4 m^{2})

The 18 foot Dinghy was used in the 1920 Summer Olympics as a double handed Olympic class. One team was present at the starting line and won the gold. Three races were scheduled, with final places decided by total points with point-for-place scoring for each race. Only one race was started with only Great Britain competing but accounts vary as to if they finished the race.

Probably the only sailing photo of the 18 foot dinghy left

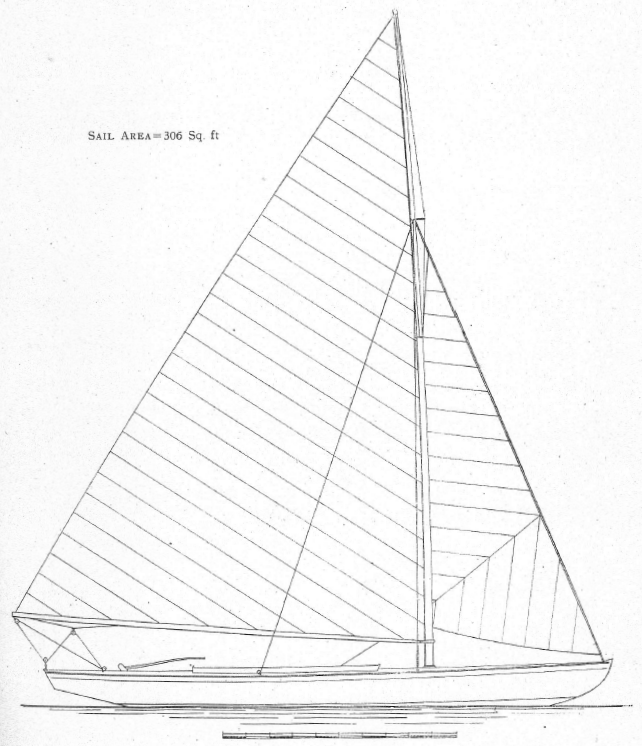
Published in The Yachting Monthly 1919

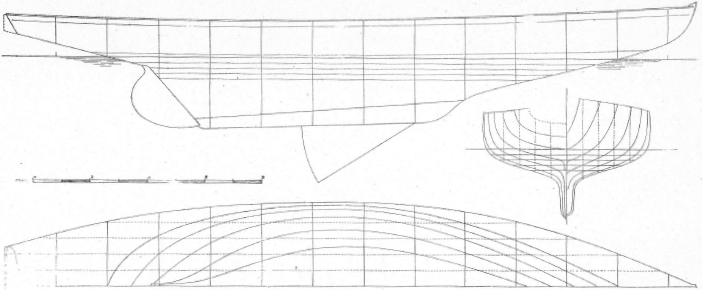
Published in The Yachting Monthly 1919

== Olympic results ==
Sources vary, giving the only participant the credits for the gold medal. Others rank them as AC?

Games	Gold	Silver	Bronze
1920 Antwerp	Great Britain (GBR); Francis Richards; Trevor Hedberg	No further competitors	No further competitors

== See also ==
- Sailing at the 1920 Summer Olympics – 18' Dinghy
- Dinghy sailing
- Dinghy racing
