= Franklin Ratsey Woodroffe =

British sailor

Franklin Woodroffe
Personal information
- Full name: Franklin Ratsey Woodroffe
- Nationality: British
- Born: 18 November 1918; Cowes, England
- Died: 19 November 2008 (aged 90); Cowes, England

Sport
- Sport: Sailing

Franklin Ratsey Woodroffe (18 November 1918 – 19 December 2008) was a British sailor. He competed in the 6 Metre event at the 1952 Summer Olympics.

Ratsey Woodroffe was born on the Isle of Wight, the son of Stanley Woodroffe and his wife Muriel Prangley Ratsey, of the Ratsey and Lapthorn sailmaking firm. He had two brothers and a sister, and their great-uncle was the Olympic sailor Colin Ratsey. In 1949 Franklin Ratsey Woodroffe became the first winner of the Edinburgh Cup, in a Dragon-class yacht called Blue Skies.

Ratsey Woodroffe had joined Ratsey and Lapthorne at the age of 18, and eventually became senior manager as well as proprietor of Vectis Sailcloth.
