= Donald Hains =

Canadian sailor

Personal information
- Born: 27 June 1916 Montreal, Quebec, Canada
- Died: 5 September 2005 (aged 89) Woodstock, New Brunswick, Canada

Sport
- Sport: Sailing

Donald Hains (27 June 1916 – 5 September 2005) was a Canadian sailor. He competed in the Dragon event at the 1952 Summer Olympics.
