= Joaquim Fiúza =

Portuguese sailor (1908–2010)

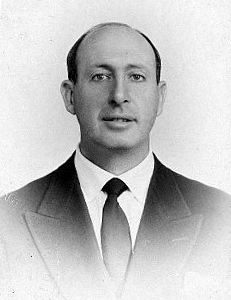

Personal information
- Full name: Joaquim Mascarenhas de Fiúza
- Nationality: Portuguese
- Born: 8 February 1908 São Domingos de Benfica, Portugal
- Died: 4 March 2010 (aged 102) Lisbon, Portugal
Medal record
Sailing
Representing Portugal
Olympic Games
Bronze medal – third place	1952 Helsinki	Star class

Joaquim Mascarenhas de Fiúza (8 February 1908 – 4 March 2010) was a Portuguese sailor who competed in three Olympic Games in 1936, 1948 and 1952. He was born in São Domingos de Benfica. At the Berlin Games he was placed 10th in the men's Star class sailing competition, alongside António de Herédia. In London he improved his performance to 6th in the same event, alongside Júlio Gourinho. In Helsinki, he won the bronze medal in the event alongside Francisco de Andrade. In 2008 he turned 100 and was recognized as Portugal's oldest living former Olympian.
