= Arthur Mooney (disambiguation) =

Arthur Mooney (1924–1988) was an Australian rules footballer.

Arthur Mooney may also refer to:

- Art Mooney (Arthur Joseph Mooney, 1911–1993), American singer and bandleader
- Jimmy Mooney (Arthur James Mooney, 1920–1972), Irish sailor and Olympian
- Arthur Mooney, co-founder of the Mooney Aircraft Company

== See also ==
- Arthur Money (disambiguation)
