= Giuseppe Carattino =

Italian sailor (1919–2014)

Medal record

Men's sailing

Representing Italy

Mediterranean Games
Gold medal – first place	1955 Barcelona	Dragon Class

Giuseppe "Pino" Carattino (15 May 1919 – 4 September 2014) was an Italian sailor who competed at the 1952 Summer Olympics in Helsinki. He was the helmsman of the Galatea II and, with partners Carlo Spirito and Antonio Carattino, placed 9th out of 17 in the Dragon Class event. He was born in Varazze, Savona and was a member of Club Nautico Varazze. He began sailing at the age of 14 when, in exchange for cleaning and rearranging their equipment, he was allowed to learn how to sail and assist his father and uncles. He had seven wins at Italian Championships in the Flying Dutchman Class and won a gold medal for Italy at the 1955 Mediterranean Games in the Dragon Class.
