= Eric Fabricius =

Finnish sailor

Personal information
- Nationality: Finnish
- Born: 6 December 1901 Turku, Finland
- Died: 20 July 1969 (aged 67) Ekenäs, Finland

Sport
- Sport: Sailing

Eric Fabricius (6 December 1901 – 20 July 1969) was a Finnish sailor. He competed in the Dragon event at the 1952 Summer Olympics.
