= Biem Dudok van Heel =

Dutch sailor (1914–1995)

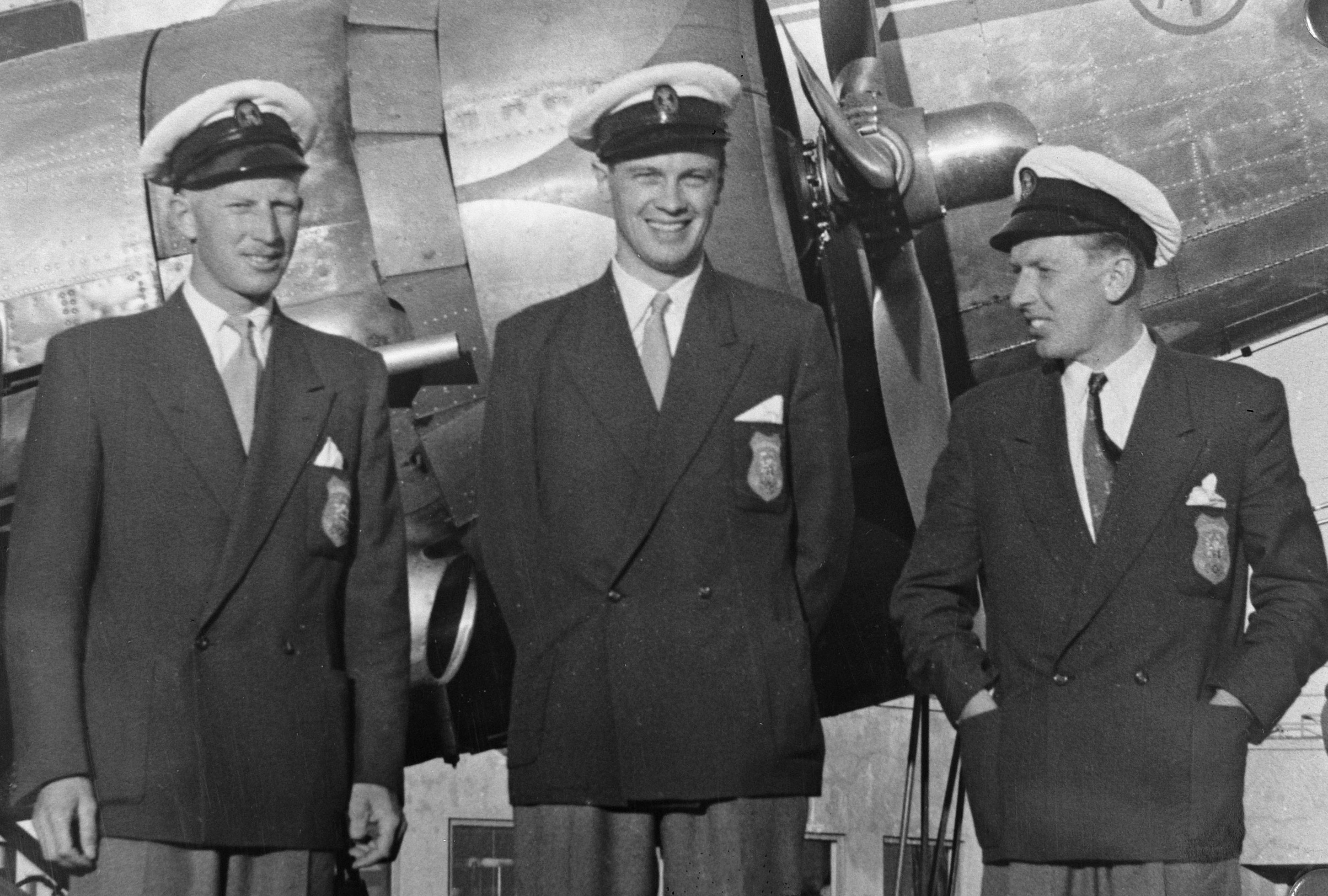
- Biem Dudok van Heel, Wim van Duyl, Michiel Dudok van Heel in 1952

Personal information
- Full name: Abraham Everardus Dudok van Heel
- Nationality: Dutch
- Born: 16 December 1917 Hilversum, the Netherlands
- Died: 2 December 1995 (aged 77) Schoten, the Netherlands
- Height: 1.72 m (5 ft 8 in)
- Weight: 70 kg (150 lb)

Sailing career
- Sport: Sailing
- Class: Dragon

Abraham Everardus "Biem" Dudok van Heel (16 December 1917 – 2 December 1995) was a sailor from the Netherlands. He competed in the Dragon class at the 1948, 1952 and 1960 Olympics and finished in 8th, 6th and 13th place, respectively. He missed the 1956 Games due to their boycott by the Netherlands. In 1952, he sailed alongside his younger brother Michiel Dudok van Heel.

== Sources ==
- Evans, Hilary; Gjerde, Arild; Heijmans, Jeroen; Mallon, Bill; et al. "Biem Dudok van Heel". Olympics at Sports-Reference.com. Sports Reference LLC. Archived from the original on 18 April 2020.
- "DE KEUZEWEDSTRIJDEN VOOR DE OLYMPISCHE SPELEN" (Evening ed.). Nieuwsblad van Friesland : Hepkema's courant. 25 June 1946.
- "Bronzen medailles voor Bob Maas en Koos de Jong" (in Dutch) (Dag ed.). Het vrĳe volk : democratisch-socialistisch dagblad. 13 August 1948.
- "The Official Report of the Organising Committee for the XIV Olympiad London 1948" (PDF). 1951. Archived from the original (PDF) on 16 July 2011.
- "OLYMPISCHE ZEILPLOEG" (Morning ed.). De vrije pers : ochtendbulletin. 20 June 1952.
- "The Officiel Report of the Organizing Committee for the games of the XV Olympiad Helsinki 1952" (PDF). 1955. Archived from the original (PDF) on 11 April 2008.
- "NEDERLANDS OLYMPISCHE EQUIPE" (in Dutch) (Day ed.). De Tijd De Maasbode. 2 August 1960.
- "Sleeswijk toch naar O.S." (in Dutch) (Day ed.). Nieuwsblad van het Noorden. 9 August 1960.
- "Weer een goede race van Verhagen Jaap Helder ook aan bod?" (in Dutch) (Day ed.). Nieuwsblad van het Noorden. 2 September 1960.
- "The Games of the XVII Olympiad Rome 1960, The Official Report of the Organizing Committee Volume One" (PDF). 1960. Archived from the original (PDF) on 27 October 2012.
- "The Games of the XVII Olympiad Rome 1960, The Official Report of the Organizing Committee Volume Two (a)" (PDF). 1960. Archived from the original (PDF) on 23 May 2011.
- "The Games of the XVII Olympiad Rome 1960, The Official Report of the Organizing Committee Volume Two (b)" (PDF). 1960. Archived from the original (PDF) on 29 October 2012.
