= Sidney Boldt-Christmas =

Swedish sailor (1924–2016)

Medal record

Sailing

Representing Sweden

Olympic Games
Silver medal – second place	1952 Helsinki	Dragon class

Leif William Sidney "Nenne" Boldt-Christmas (8 August 1924 – 15 October 2016) was a Swedish sailor who competed in the 1952 Summer Olympics. He was born in Gothenburg. In 1952 he won the silver medal as crew member of the Swedish boat Tornado in the Dragon class.
