= John Barrington-Ward =

British sailor

Personal information
- Nationality: British
- Born: 28 August 1928; Hindhead, England
- Died: 4 July 2013 (aged 84); Newport, England

Sport
- Sport: Sailing

John Barrington-Ward (28 August 1928 – 4 July 2013) was a British sailor. He competed in the Dragon event at the 1952 Summer Olympics.
