= Charles Stern =

Swiss sailor (1914–1976)

Personal information
- Nationality: Swiss
- Born: 2 May 1914
- Died: 11 October 1976 (aged 62)

Sport
- Sport: Sailing

Charles Stern (2 May 1914 – 11 October 1976) was a Swiss sailor. He competed at the 1948 Summer Olympics and the 1952 Summer Olympics.
