= Hipólito Gil =

Argentine sailor

Personal information
- Nationality: Argentine
- Born: 14 July 1904
- Died: 13 October 1998 (aged 94)

Sport
- Sport: Sailing

Hipólito Gil (13 July 1904 – 14 October 1998) was an Argentine sailor. He competed in the 8 Metre event at the 1936 Summer Olympics.
