= Hakon Barfod =

Norwegian sailor (1926–2013)

Personal information
- Nationality: Norwegian
- Born: 17 August 1926 Oslo
- Died: 4 November 2013 (aged 87)

Sport
- Sport: Sailing
Medal record
Men's sailing
Representing Norway
Olympic Games
Gold medal – first place	1948 London	Dragon
Gold medal – first place	1952 Helsinki	Dragon

Hakon Barfod (17 August 1926 – 4 November 2013) was a Norwegian sailor and Olympic champion. He was born in Oslo. He competed at the 1948 Summer Olympics in London, where he received a gold medal in the dragon class as crew member on the boat Pan.

He competed at the 1952 Summer Olympics in Helsinki, where he again received a gold medal with Pan.
