= Edvin Hagberg =

Edvin Hagberg (July 31, 1875 – September 1, 1947) was a Swedish sailor who competed in the 1908 Summer Olympics and in the 1912 Summer Olympics. In 1908, he was a crew member of the Swedish boat Saga, which finished fifth in the 8 metre class competition. Four years later, he was part of the Swedish boat Sass, which finished fourth in the 6 metre class competition.
