= Horacio Monti =

Argentine sailor

Personal information
- Nationality: Argentine
- Born: 12 August 1911

Sport
- Sport: Sailing

Horacio Monti (born 12 August 1911, date of death unknown) was an Argentine sailor. He competed in the 6 Metre event at the 1952 Summer Olympics.
