= Trevor Hedberg =

British sailor

Trevor Hedberg (2 February 1886 – 11 September 1954) was a British sailor and Olympic champion. He competed at the 1920 Summer Olympics in Antwerp and won a gold medal in the 18 ft. Dinghy class with Francis Richards. Sailing the boat Brat, Richards and Hedberg were the only entrants in their class. It is uncertain if this crew was actually awarded the gold medals – they were not able to finish the first competition and they did not start in any other; they do not appear in the Official Report of the Antwerp Games. However they are listed on the website of the ISAF as well as that of the IOC as Gold Medalists.
