= Archibald Howie (sailor) =

Canadian sailor

Personal information
- Nationality: Canadian
- Born: 13 April 1908
- Died: 12 September 1990 (aged 82)

Sport
- Sport: Sailing

Archibald Howie (13 April 1908 – 12 September 1990) was a Canadian sailor. He competed in the Dragon event at the 1952 Summer Olympics.
