= Domenico Carattino =

Italian sailor

Domenico Carattino (9 September 1920 – 10 September 2014) was an Italian sailor who competed in the 1968 Summer Olympics.
