= Wolfgang Elsner =

German sailor

Wolfgang Herrmann Elsner (11 September 1906 – 1 January 1981) was a German sailor who competed in the 1952 Summer Olympics.
