= André Deryckere =

Belgian sailor and judge (1928–2019)

Personal information
- Nationality: Belgian
- Born: 19 January 1928; Ostend, Belgium
- Died: 5 December 2019 (aged 91); Ostend, Belgium

Sport
- Sport: Sailing

André Deryckere (19 November 1928 — 5 December 2019) was a Belgian sailor and judge. He competed in the Dragon event at the 1952 Summer Olympics in Helsinki, Finland. He worked at the family business of the Deryckere family, the clothes shop Caddy-Tailors. Later, he became a judge at the Commercial Tribunal Ostend-Bruges, from 1991 to 1997 he presided over the tribunal.

== Personal life ==
Deryckere married Brigitte Hollebecq (born 19 September 1932) from Mouscron and had five children.
