= Peter Mangels =

Brazilian sailor

Personal information
- Nationality: Brazilian
- Born: 14 June 1927
- Died: 11 May 1991 (aged 63)

Sport
- Sport: Sailing

Peter Mangels (14 June 1927 – 11 May 1991) was a Brazilian sailor. He competed in the Dragon event at the 1952 Summer Olympics.
