= Giorgio Audizio =

Italian sailor (1911–1978)

Personal information
- Nationality: Italian
- Born: 29 April 1911 Genoa, Italy
- Died: 13 June 1978 (aged 67) Genoa, Italy

Sport
- Sport: Sailing

Giorgio Audizio (29 April 1911 – 13 June 1978) was an Italian sailor. He competed at the 1948 Summer Olympics and the 1952 Summer Olympics.
