= Alberto Graça =

Portuguese sailor

Personal information
- Full name: Alberto Graça Júnior
- Nationality: Portuguese
- Born: 9 September 1918; Estoril, Cascais, Portugal
- Died: 21 November 1961 (aged 43); Rio de Janeiro, Brazil

Sport
- Sport: Sailing

Alberto Graça Júnior (9 September 1918 – 21 November 1961) was a Portuguese sailor. He competed in the Dragon event at the 1952 Summer Olympics.
