= Francisco de Andrade =

Portuguese sailor (1923–2021)

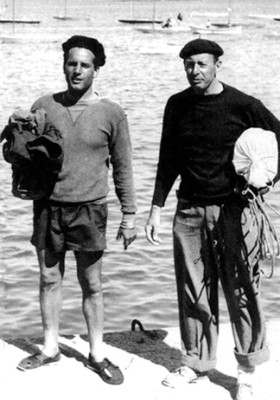
- Andrade (left) with Fiúza at the 1952 Olympics

Personal information
- Full name: Francisco Rebello de Andrade
- Nationality: Portuguese
- Born: 16 August 1923 Lisbon, Portugal
- Died: 28 April 2021 (aged 97) Lisbon, Portugal
Medal record
Sailing
Representing Portugal
Olympic Games
Bronze medal – third place	1952 Helsinki	Star class

Francisco Manuel Vieira Rebello de Andrade (16 August 1923 – 28 April 2021) was a Portuguese sailor. He won a bronze medal in the Star class at the 1952 Summer Olympics in Helsinki, together with Joaquim Fiúza. De Andrade died on 28 April 2021, at the age of 97.
