= Joyce Horton =

American sailor

Personal information
- Born: May 14, 1935 (age 91) Los Angeles, California, United States

Sport
- Sport: Sailing

Joyce Horton (born May 14, 1935) is an American sailor. She competed in the Dragon event at the 1952 Summer Olympics.
