= Dietz Angerer =

Austrian sailor (1904 1988)

Personal information
- Full name: Dietrich Angerer
- Nationality: Austrian
- Born: 26 January 1904; Vienna, Austria-Hungary
- Died: 1 April 1988 (aged 84); Vienna, Austria

Sport
- Sport: Sailing

Dietz Angerer (26 January 1904 – 1 April 1988) was an Austrian sailor. He competed in the O-Jolle event at the 1936 Summer Olympics.
