= Eugenio Lauz =

Uruguayan sailor

Personal information
- Nationality: Uruguayan
- Born: 8 September 1904
- Died: 1974 (aged 69–70)

Sport
- Sport: Sailing

Eugenio Lauz (8 September 1904 – 1974) was a Uruguayan sailor. He competed at the 1936 Summer Olympics and the 1952 Summer Olympics.
