= Bror Johansson =

Finnish sailor (1921–2009)

Personal information
- Nationality: Finnish
- Born: 15 October 1921 Helsinki, Finland
- Died: 18 March 2009 (aged 87) Helsinki, Finland

Sport
- Sport: Sailing

Bror Johansson (15 October 1921 – 18 March 2009) was a Finnish sailor. He competed in the Dragon event at the 1952 Summer Olympics.
