= Hans Lubinus =

German sailor

Personal information
- Nationality: German
- Born: Hans Johann Georg Lubinus; 25 December 1893 Kiel, German Empire
- Died: 3 July 1973 (aged 79) Kiel, West Germany

Hans Johann Georg Lubinus (25 December 1893 – 3 July 1973) was a German sailor. He competed in the mixed 6 metres at the 1936 Summer Olympics and the mixed 5.5 metres at the 1952 and 1956 Summer Olympics.

== Personal life ==
Lubinus served in the German Army during the First World War, and was awarded the Iron Cross First and Second Class. During the Second World War, he served as a surgeon on the Berlin. In this function, he was involved in compulsory sterilisation.
