= Leo Nagornoff =

Finnish sailor

Personal information
- Nationality: Finnish
- Born: 16 January 1925; Helsinki, Finland
- Died: 9 June 2011 (aged 86)

Sport
- Sport: Sailing

Leo Nagornoff (16 January 1925 – 9 June 2011) was a Finnish sailor. He competed in the Dragon event at the 1952 Summer Olympics.
