= Rafael Iglesias (sailor) =

Argentine sailor

Personal information
- Full name: Rafael Ernesto Iglesias
- Nationality: Argentine
- Born: 10 December 1905

Sailing career
- Sport: Sailing
- Class: 8 Metre
- Updated on 13 March 2015

Rafael Ernesto Iglesias (born 10 December 1905, date of death unknown) was a sailor from Argentina, who represented his country at the 1928 Summer Olympics and the 1936 Summer Olympics.

== Sources ==
- "Rafael Iglesias Bio, Stats, and Results". Olympic Sports. Sports-Reference.com. Archived from the original on 18 April 2020.
