= Bevan Worcester =

Australian sailor

Personal information
- Nationality: Australian
- Born: 12 July 1925; Kew, Victoria, Australia
- Died: 14 February 1969 (aged 43); Melbourne, Australia

Sport
- Sport: Sailing

Bevan Worcester (12 July 1925 – 14 February 1969) was an Australian sailor. He competed in the Dragon event at the 1952 Summer Olympics.
