= Edward Dyson (sailor) =

British sailor (1919–2020)

Personal information
- Nationality: British
- Born: 10 October 1919 Coimbatore, India
- Died: 5 March 2020 (aged 100) Aldbourne, England

Sport
- Sport: Sailing

Edward Dyson MBE (10 October 1919 – 5 March 2020) was a British sailor. He competed in the Dragon event at the 1952 Summer Olympics.

Dyson served in the British Army with the Royal Artillery through World War II, was awarded the MBE in 1958, and retired with the rank of major in 1966.

== See also ==
- List of centenarians (sportspeople)
