= Per Gedda =

Swedish sailor

Medal record

Sailing

Representing Sweden

Olympic Games
Silver medal – second place	1952 Helsinki	Dragon class

Per Olof "Pelle" Harald Gedda (28 August 1914 – 4 July 2005) was a Swedish sailor who competed in the 1936 Summer Olympics and in the 1952 Summer Olympics. He was born in Västra Frölunda.

In 1936 he was a crew member of the Swedish boat Ilderim which finished fourth in the 8-metre class event.

Sixteen years later he won the silver medal as helmsman of the Swedish boat Tornado in the Dragon class. He died in Stockholm in 2005.
