= Alf Delany =

Irish sailor

Personal information
- Nationality: Irish
- Born: 16 May 1911; Mohill, Ireland
- Died: 13 December 2006 (aged 95); Dublin, Ireland

Sport
- Sport: Sailing

Alf Delany (16 May 1911 – 13 December 2006) was an Irish sailor. He grew up in the town of Longford and spent many of his summers at Tarmonbarry, County Roscommon where the family lived on a houseboat, the 'La Vague II'. He learned how to sail from his father, Dr. Vincent S. Delany, and from a family employee Michael Donlon. Much of his early training took place on the Delany family Lough Erne, Fairy 'Oberon'. He competed at the 1948 Summer Olympics at Torquay in the Swallow class, sailing with Hugh Allen in a boat called 'Cloud'. He competed at the 1952 Summer Olympics at Helsinki, Finland in the Finn singlehanded Class in a boat provided by the Olympic Regatta organisers.
