= Guy le Mouroux =

French sailor

Personal information
- Nationality: French
- Born: 9 January 1918 Baden, France
- Died: 11 August 1990 (aged 72) Paris, France

Sport
- Sport: Sailing

Guy le Mouroux (9 January 1918 – 11 August 1990) was a French sailor. He competed in the Dragon event at the 1952 Summer Olympics.
