= Horacio Campi =

Argentine sailor (born 1917)

Horacio Alberto Campi
Personal information
- Born: 26 November 1917; Buenos Aires, Argentina

Sport
- Sport: Sailing

Horacio Campi (born 26 November 1917, date of death unknown) was an Argentine sailor. He competed in the Dragon event at the 1952 Summer Olympics. Campi is deceased.
