= Robert Steele (sailor) =

British sailor

Personal information
- Nationality: British
- Born: 26 February 1893
- Died: 29 September 1969 (aged 76); Bishops Sutton, England

Sport
- Sport: Sailing

Robert Steele (26 February 1893 – 29 September 1969) was a British sailor. He competed at the 1936 Summer Olympics and the 1952 Summer Olympics.
