= Paul McLaughlin (sailor) =

Canadian sailor

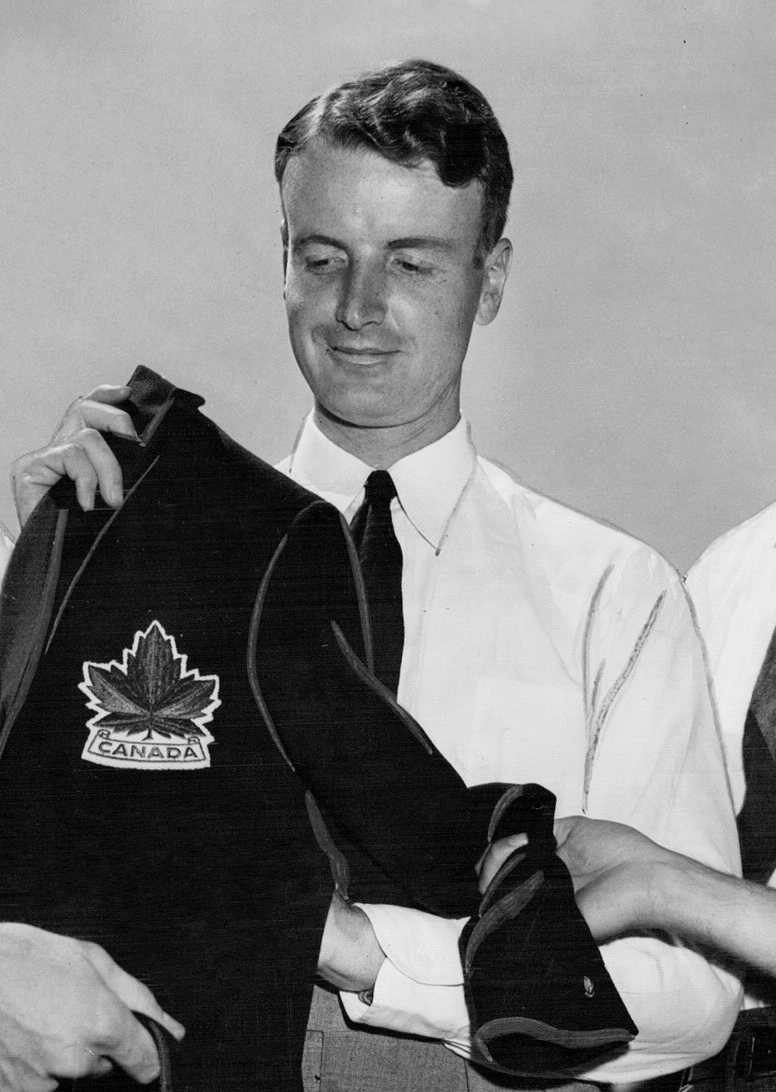
- McLaughlin in 1948

Personal information
- Born: Paul James McLaughlin; September 28, 1919
- Died: July 2, 2000 (aged 80)

Sport
- Sport: Sailing
- Club: Royal Canadian Yacht Club

Paul James McLaughlin (September 28, 1919 – July 2, 2000) was a Canadian sailor. He competed at the 1948 and 1952 Olympics in single-person dinghy and finished fifth and eighth, respectively. At both Games he was the captain and manager of the Canadian sailing teams. In 1977 he was inducted into the Canadian Olympic Hall of Fame.

His wife was also a competitive sailor. Their sons Terry and Frank became Olympic medalists in sailing, and grandson, Evert McLaughlin, competed with his father Terry at the 2015 Pan American Games.

During World War II McLaughlin served in the Royal Canadian Navy, and took part in the Dunkirk evacuation, where more than 338,000 allied troops were rescued during the Battle of Dunkirk.
