= Colin Ratsey =

British sailor and sail maker

Medal record

Sailing

Representing Great Britain

Olympic Games
Silver medal – second place	1932 Los Angeles	Star

World Championships
Silver medal – second place	1931 Western Long Island Sound	Star

George Colin Ratsey (30 July 1906 – 12 March 1984), educated at Brighton College, was a British sailor and sail maker who competed in the 1932 Summer Olympics. He won the silver medal in the Star class. He is the son of George Ernest Ratsey and granduncle of another Olympic sailor, Franklin Ratsey Woodroffe.

== See also ==
- Ratsey and Lapthorn
