= Erland Almqvist =

Swedish sailor (1912–1999)

Olympic medal record

Sailing

Representing Sweden
Silver medal – second place	1952 Helsinki	Dragon class

Erland H. L. Almqvist (2 September 1912 – 20 September 1999) was a Swedish sailor who competed in the 1952 Summer Olympics. He was born in Stockholm. In 1952 he won the silver medal as crew member of the Swedish boat Tornado in the Dragon class. He died in Lidingö in 1999.
