= Federico De Luca =

Italian sailor

Personal information
- Nationality: Italian
- Born: 13 April 1914; Naples, Italy
- Died: 30 May 1991 (aged 77); Naples, Italy

Sport
- Sport: Sailing

Federico De Luca (13 April 1914 – 30 May 1991) was an Italian sailor. He competed in the Star event at the 1936 Summer Olympics.
