= Arturo Mas =

Spanish sailor

Personal information
- Full name: Artur Mas i Bové
- Nationality: Spanish
- Born: Arturo Mas Bové; 15 October 1901 Barcelona, Spain
- Died: 18 December 1979 (aged 78) Barcelona, Spain

Sport

Sailing career
- Class: 6 Metre
- Club: Real Club Marítimo de Barcelona

Arturo Mas (15 October 1901 – 18 December 1979) was a sailor from Spain, who represented his country at the 1924 Summer Olympics in Le Havre, France.

== Sources ==
- Les Jeux de la VIIIe Olympiade Paris 1924:rapport official (PDF) (in French). Paris: Librairie de France: Comité Olympique Français. 1924. Archived from the original (PDF) on 21 April 2013.
