= Willy Pieper =

Swiss sailor

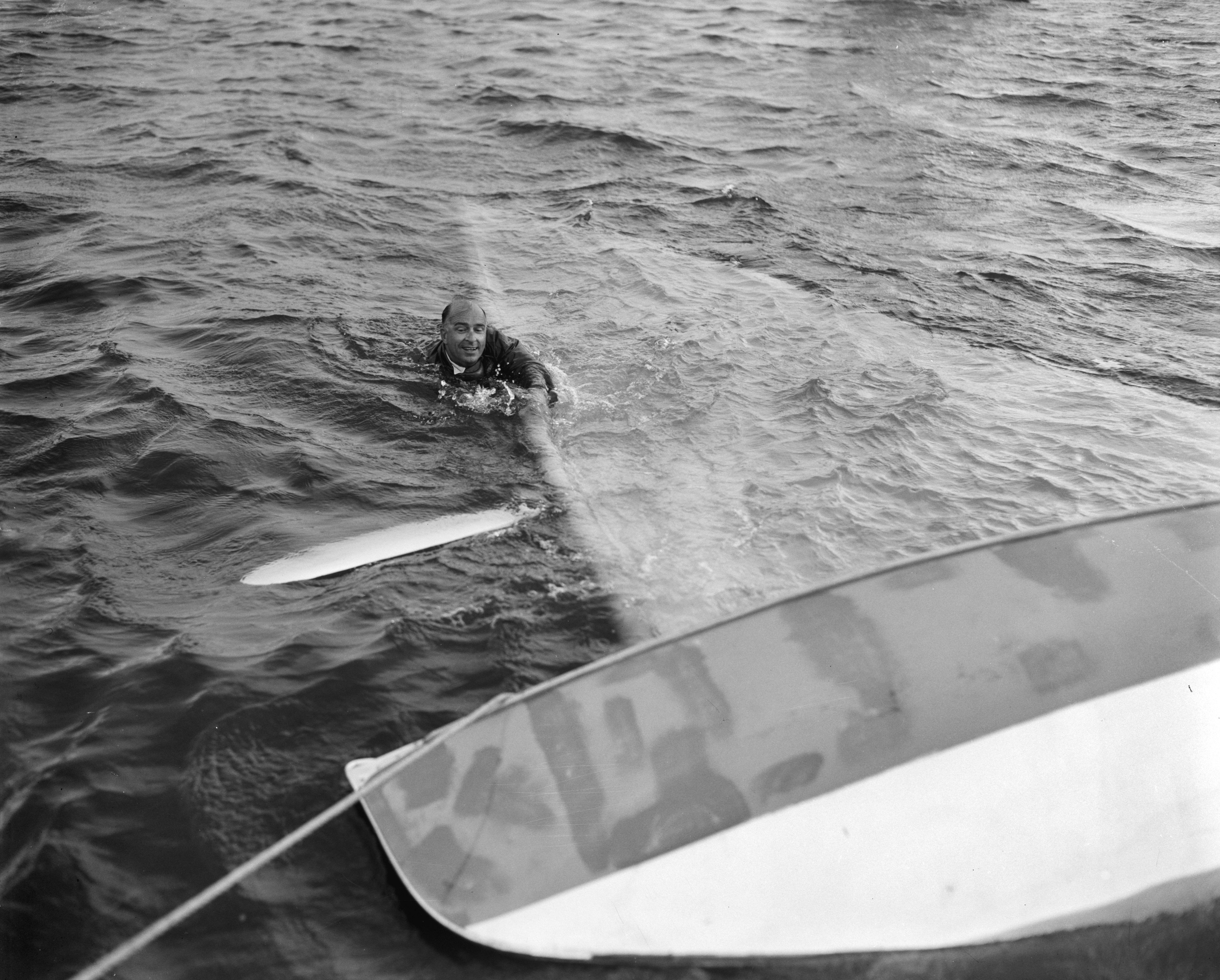
- Pieper (Loosdrecht, 1956)

Personal information
- Nationality: Swiss
- Born: 9 July 1911
- Died: 27 April 1990 (aged 78)

Sport
- Sport: Sailing

Willy Pieper (9 July 1911 – 27 April 1990) was a Swiss sailor. He competed at the 1936 Summer Olympics and the 1952 Summer Olympics.
