= Michiel Dudok van Heel =

Dutch sailor (1924–2003)

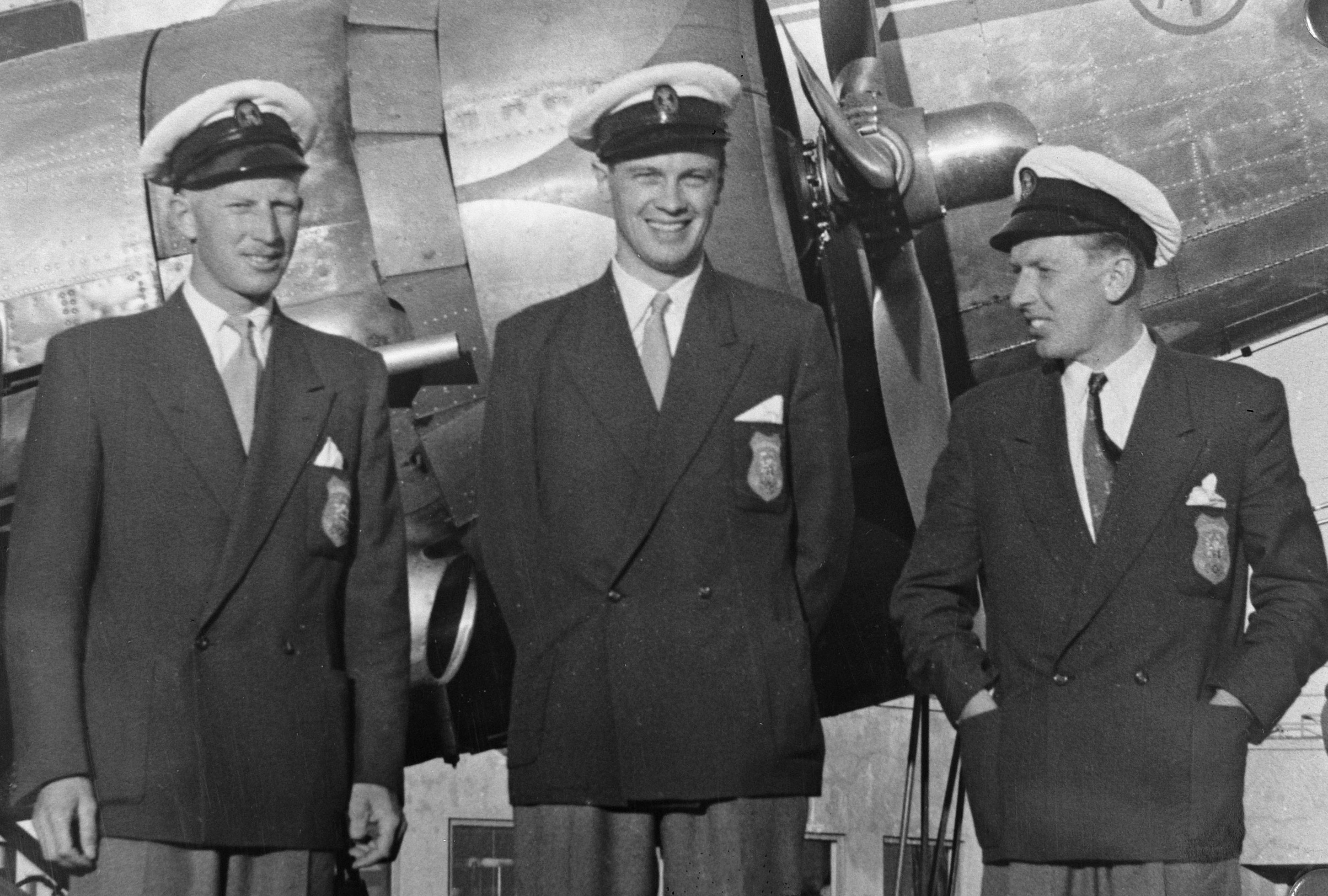
- Biem Dudok van Heel, Wim van Duyl and Michiel Dudok van Heel in 1952

Personal information
- Full name: Michiel Dudok van Heel
- Nationality: Dutch
- Born: 9 October 1924 Huizen, the Netherlands
- Died: 20 October 2003 (aged 79) Santa Cristina d'Aro, Spain

Sailing career
- Sport: Sailing
- Class: Dragon

Michiel Dudok van Heel (20 October 1924 – 30 October 2003) was a sailor from the Netherlands. Together with his brother Biem Dudok van Heel and helmsman Wim van Duyl he finished in sixth place in the Dragon class at the 1952 Summer Olympics.

== Sources ==
- "Michiel Dudok van Heel Bio, Stats, and Results". Olympic Sports. Sports-Reference.com. Archived from the original on 18 April 2020.
- "OLYMPISCHE ZEILPLOEG" (Morning ed.). De vrije pers : ochtendbulletin. 20 June 1952.
- "The Officiel Report of the Organizing Committee for the games of the XV Olympiad Helsinki 1952" (PDF). 1955. Archived from the original (PDF) on 11 April 2008.
