= Francisco Isoldi =

Brazilian sailor

Personal information
- Nationality: Brazilian
- Born: 13 July 1923
- Died: 14 June 1994 (aged 70)

Sport
- Sport: Sailing

Francisco Isoldi (13 July 1923 – 14 June 1994) was a Brazilian sailor. He competed in the Dragon event at the 1952 Summer Olympics.
