= Karlo Bauman =

Croatian sailor (1914–1954)

Personal information
- Nationality: Croatian
- Born: 2 February 1914; Zelenika, Austria-Hungary
- Died: 6 July 1954 (aged 40); Split, Yugoslavia

Sport
- Sport: Sailing

Karlo Bauman (2 February 1914 – 6 July 1954) was a Croatian sailor. He competed at the 1936 Summer Olympics and the 1952 Summer Olympics.
