= Jimmy Mooney =

Irish sailor

Personal information
- Full name: Arthur James Mooney
- Nationality: Irish
- Born: 25 February 1920 Dublin, Ireland
- Died: 29 February 1972 (aged 52) Sandycove, Ireland

Sport
- Sport: Sailing

Arthur James Mooney (25 February 1920 – 29 February 1972) was an Irish sailor. He competed at the 1948 Summer Olympics and the 1960 Summer Olympics.
