= Wim van Duyl =

Dutch sailor (1920–2006)

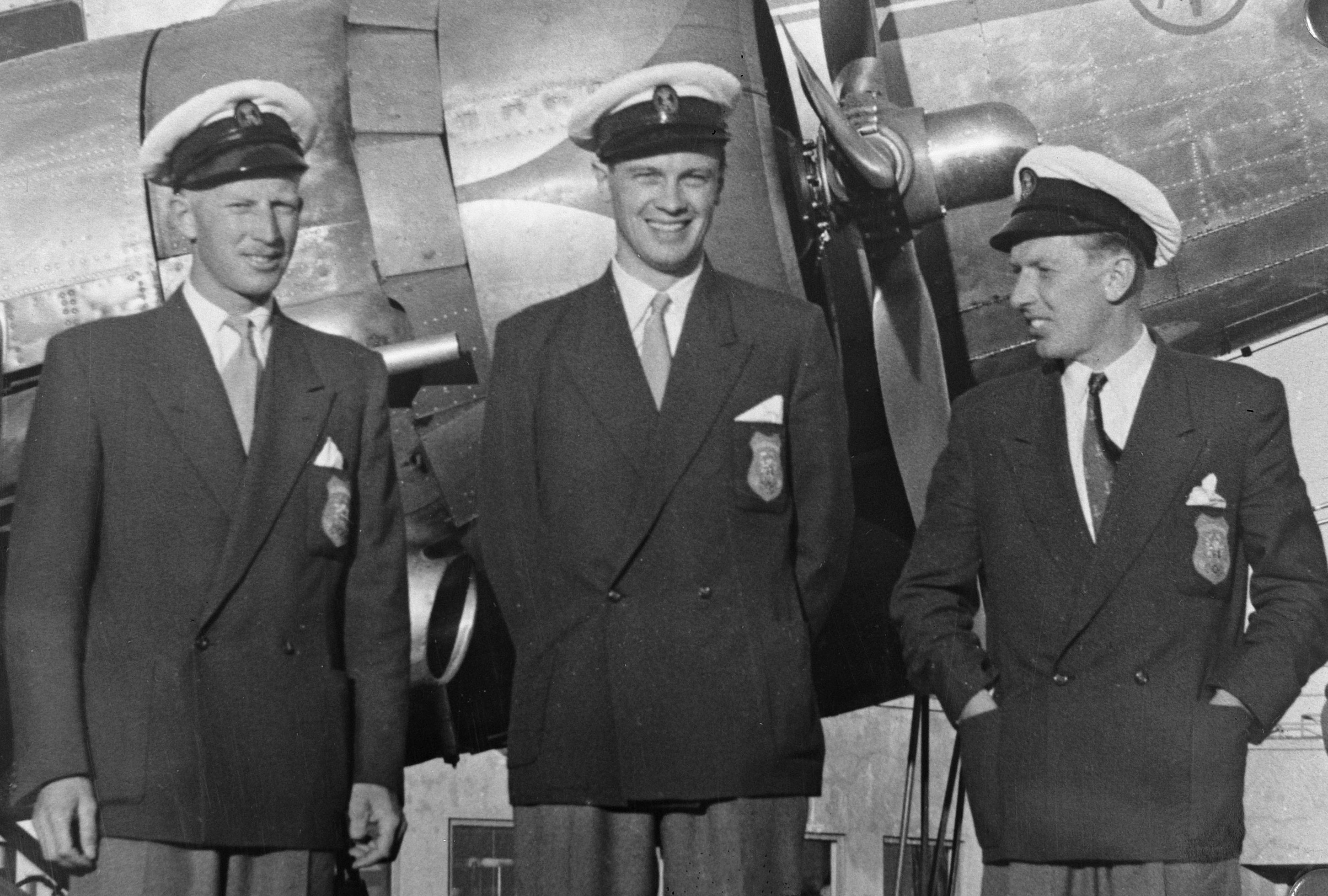
- Biem Dudok van Heel, Wim van Duyl and Michiel Dudok van Heel in 1952

Personal information
- Full name: Willem Paul van Duyl
- Nationality: Dutch
- Born: 24 May 1920 Amsterdam, the Netherlands
- Died: 3 September 2006 (aged 86) Bussum, the Netherlands
- Height: 1.89 m (6 ft 2 in)
- Weight: 90 kg (198 lb)

Sailing career
- Sport: Sailing
- Class: Dragon

Willem Paul "Wim" van Duyl (24 May 1920 – 3 September 2006) was a sailor from the Netherlands. He competed in the Dragon class at the 1948, 1952, 1960 and 1964 Olympics and finished in 8th, 6th, 13th and 13th place, respectively. He missed the 1956 Games due to their boycott by the Netherlands.

Van Duyl was CEO of Bull Nederland and later Honeywell Bull Netherlands.

== Controversy ==
During the Olympic regatta of 1964 a controversy emerged between the team members (Van Duyl and Jongkind) of the Dutch Dragon resulting in Jongkind leaving Japan after the second race. After the Games the Koninklijk Nederlands Watersport Verbond banned them both from competitions for two years.

== Sources ==
- Evans, Hilary; Gjerde, Arild; Heijmans, Jeroen; Mallon, Bill; et al. "Wim van Duyl". Olympics at Sports-Reference.com. Sports Reference LLC. Archived from the original on 18 April 2020.
- "DE KEUZEWEDSTRIJDEN VOOR DE OLYMPISCHE SPELEN" (Evening ed.). Nieuwsblad van Friesland : Hepkema's courant. 25 June 1946.
- "Bronzen medailles voor Bob Maas en Koos de Jong" (in Dutch) (Dag ed.). Het vrĳe volk : democratisch-socialistisch dagblad. 13 August 1948.
- "The Official Report of the Organising Committee for the XIV Olympiad London 1948" (PDF). 1951. Archived from the original (PDF) on 16 July 2011.
- "OLYMPISCHE ZEILPLOEG" (Morning ed.). De vrije pers : ochtendbulletin. 20 June 1952.
- "The Officiel Report of the Organizing Committee for the games of the XV Olympiad Helsinki 1952" (PDF). 1955. Archived from the original (PDF) on 11 April 2008.
- "Zeilteam voor Melbourne" (in Dutch) (Day ed.). De Tĳd : godsdienstig-staatkundig dagblad. 13 July 1956.
- "Olympische sporters 1956 krijgen alsnog erkenning" (in Dutch) (Day ed.). Geschiedenis 24. 3 July 2006.
- "Wij hadden moeten gaan" (in Dutch) (Day ed.). Nieuwsblad van het Noorden. 24 December 1956.
- "NEDERLANDS OLYMPISCHE EQUIPE" (in Dutch) (Day ed.). De Tijd De Maasbode. 2 August 1960.
- "Sleeswijk toch naar O.S." (in Dutch) (Day ed.). Nieuwsblad van het Noorden. 9 August 1960.
- "Weer een goede race van Verhagen Jaap Helder ook aan bod?" (in Dutch) (Day ed.). Nieuwsblad van het Noorden. 2 September 1960.
- "The Games of the XVII Olympiad Rome 1960, The Official Report of the Organizing Committee Volume One" (PDF). 1960. Archived from the original (PDF) on 27 October 2012.
- "The Games of the XVII Olympiad Rome 1960, The Official Report of the Organizing Committee Volume Two (a)" (PDF). 1960. Archived from the original (PDF) on 23 May 2011.
- "The Games of the XVII Olympiad Rome 1960, The Official Report of the Organizing Committee Volume Two (b)" (PDF). 1960. Archived from the original (PDF) on 29 October 2012.
- "Zeilploeg voor Tokio bekend" (in Dutch). Het vrĳe volk : democratisch-socialistisch dagblad. 9 May 1964.
- "Kunde" (in Dutch) (Day ed.). De Telegraaf. 21 September 1964.
- "Geen familie-omstandigheden maar.... Moeilijkheden in Tokio leidden tot terugkeer Jan Jongkind: "pijnlijke zaak"" (in Dutch) (Day ed.). Dagblad De Telegraaf. 17 October 1964.
- "Olympische zeilers Van Duyl en Jan Jongkind gestraft" (in Dutch). Leeuwarder courant : hoofdblad van Friesland. 16 December 1964.
- "The Games of the XVIII Olympiad Tokio 1964, The Official Report of the Organizing Committee Volume One Part One" (PDF). 1964. Archived from the original (PDF) on 6 May 2010.
- "The Games of the XVIII Olympiad Tokio 1964, The Official Report of the Organizing Committee Volume One Part Two" (PDF). 1964. Archived from the original (PDF) on 18 November 2008.
- "The Games of the XVIII Olympiad Tokio 1964, The Official Report of the Organizing Committee Volume Two Part One" (PDF). 1964. Archived from the original (PDF) on 26 February 2008.
- "The Games of the XVIII Olympiad Tokio 1964, The Official Report of the Organizing Committee Volume Two Part Two" (PDF). 1964. Archived from the original (PDF) on 26 January 2009.
- "An Update Special" (PDF) (Dag ed.). Update Rockville Maryland. 17 January 1977.
