= Marcel de Kerviler =

French naval officer and sailor

- Born: Marcel Stanislas Marie Joseph Ambroise Pocard du Cosquer de Kerviler; 11 July 1910; Angers, France
- Died: 27 January 1989 (aged 78); Auray, France
- Awards: Legion d'Honneur, Ordre du Mérite Maritime, Ordre des Palmes académiques, Ordre du Mérite Sportif
- Military career
- Allegiance: France
- Branch: French Navy
- Rank: Contre-amiral
- Awards: Croix de Guerre 1939–1945
- Sports career
- Country: France
- Sport: Sailing

Marcel Stanislas Marie Joseph Ambroise Pocard du Cosquer de Kerviler (11 July 1910 – 27 January 1989) was a French naval officer and competitive sailor. He competed at the 1948 Summer Olympics and the 1952 Summer Olympics.

Kerviler joined the French Navy in 1930, enrolling at the École Navale. He was first commissioned as a junior officer in 1932, gaining promotion to lieutenant de vaisseau in 1942, and capitaine de corvette in 1950. He rose to the rank of contre-amiral. Among his many honours, he was a recipient of the Croix de Guerre 1939–1945, and appointed as an officer of the Legion d'Honneur, an officer of the Ordre du Mérite Maritime, an Officier d'Académie, and a commander of the Ordre du Mérite Sportif.

Kerviler competed in many international sailing regattas, representing France. He also wrote several books.
