= António de Herédia =

Portuguese sailor (1901–1997)

Personal information
- Full name: António Guedes de Herédia
- Nationality: Portuguese
- Born: 10 March 1901 Lisbon, Portugal
- Died: 13 August 1997 (aged 96) Lisbon, Portugal

Sport

Sailing career
- Class: 6 Metre
Competition record
Sailing
Representing Portugal
Olympic Games
1928 Amsterdam	6 Metre

António Guedes de Herédia (10 March 1901 – 13 August 1997) was a Portuguese sailor. He represented Portugal at the 1928 Summer Olympics, 1936 Summer Olympics and the 1948 Summer Olympics.

== Sources ==
- "António de Herédia Bio, Stats, and Results". Olympic Sports. Sports-Reference.com. Archived from the original on 18 April 2020.
