= George Ratsey =

British sailor

Medal record

Sailing

Representing Great Britain

Olympic Games
Bronze medal – third place	1908 London	8 Metre

George Ernest Ratsey (25 July 1875 – 25 December 1942) was a British sailor who competed in the 1908 Summer Olympics. He is the father of George Colin Ratsey and Ernest Ratsey.

== Biography ==
He was a crew member of the British boat Sorais, which won the bronze medal in the 8 metre class. He died on 25 December 1942 in New Rochelle, New York.
