= Wolfgang Richter =

Brazilian sailor

Personal information
- Born: 17 August 1926 São Paulo, Brazil
- Died: 25 June 2016 (aged 89)

Sport
- Sport: Sailing
- Club: Yacht Club Santo Amaro

Wolfgang Edgar Richter (17 August 1926 – 25 June 2016) was a Brazilian sailor. He competed at the 1948 Summer Olympics, the 1952 Summer Olympics and the 1960 Summer Olympics.
