= Madeleine De Meulemeester =

Madeleine De Meulemeester (January 8, 1904 in Bruges - September 3, 1996 in Lincé) was a Belgian lawyer, scouts functionary and rescuer of Jewish children during the Second World War.

With Chanoine Leclerq, she founded the Jeunesse Universitaire Catholique féminine (JUC) and the Association of Femmes Universitaires Catholiques (AFUC), which she later transferred to the scout organization Guides Catholiques de Belgique.
