= Jean Frain de la Gaulayrie =

French sailor

Personal information
- Nationality: French
- Born: 13 July 1918 Saint-Pol-de-Léon, France
- Died: 19 July 1980 (aged 62) Paris, France

Sport
- Sport: Sailing

Jean Frain de la Gaulayrie (13 July 1918 – 19 July 1980) was a French sailor. He competed at the 1948 Summer Olympics and the 1952 Summer Olympics.
