= Jean De Meulemeester =

Belgian sailor

Personal information
- Nationality: Belgian
- Born: 19 May 1922
- Died: 29 November 1970 (aged 48)

Sport
- Sport: Sailing

Jean De Meulemeester (19 May 1922 – 29 November 1970) was a Belgian sailor. He competed in the Dragon event at the 1952 Summer Olympics.
