= Giusto Spigno =

Italian sailor

Personal information
- Nationality: Italian
- Born: 4 June 1916
- Died: 29 April 1982 (aged 65)

Sport
- Sport: Sailing

Giusto Spigno (4 June 1916 – 29 April 1982) was an Italian sailor who competed in the 1952 Summer Olympics.
