= Thomas Somers (sailor) =

British sailor

Personal information
- Nationality: British
- Born: 7 April 1909 Dudley, England
- Died: March 1984 Cirencester, England

Sport
- Sport: Sailing

Thomas Somers (7 April 1909 – 17 March 1984) was a British sailor. He competed in the Dragon event at the 1952 Summer Olympics sailing Sabre, Dragon Sail Number K215, Camper and Nicholsons yard number 750.
