= Ivan Matveyev =

Soviet sailor

Personal information
- Nationality: Soviet
- Born: 10 February 1914 Saint Petersburg, Russia
- Died: 5 July 1984 (aged 70)

Sport
- Sport: Sailing

Ivan Matveyev (10 February 1914 – 5 July 1984) was a Soviet sailor. He competed at the 1952 Summer Olympics and the 1956 Summer Olympics.
