= Ratsey and Lapthorn =

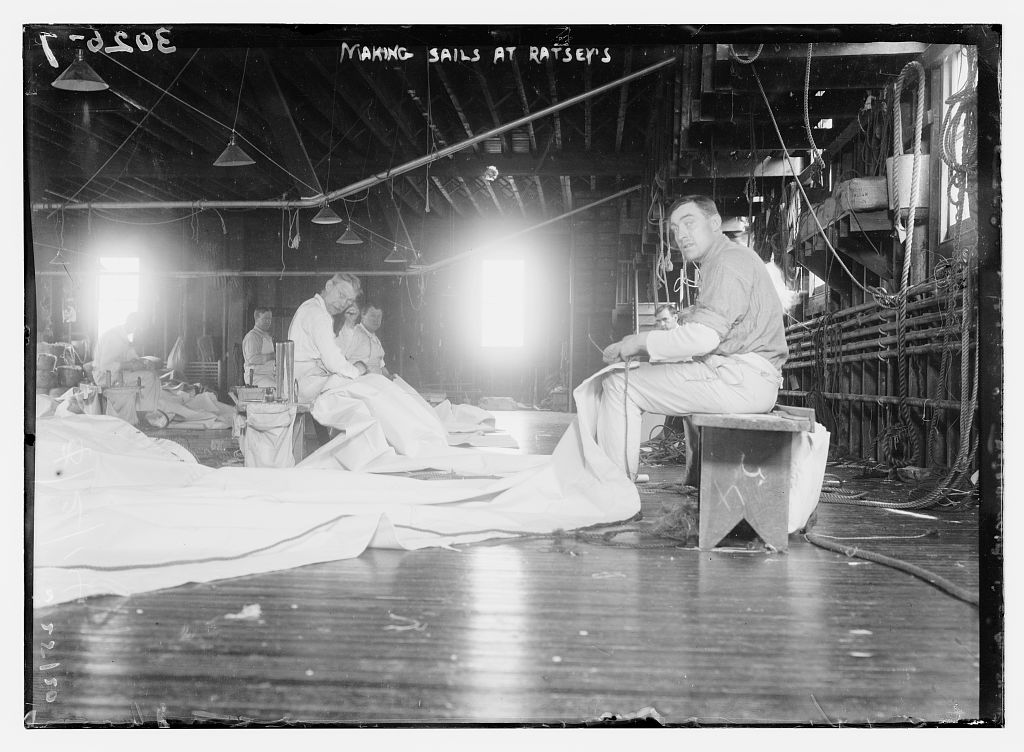
Ratsey's sail making company on City Island in 1914

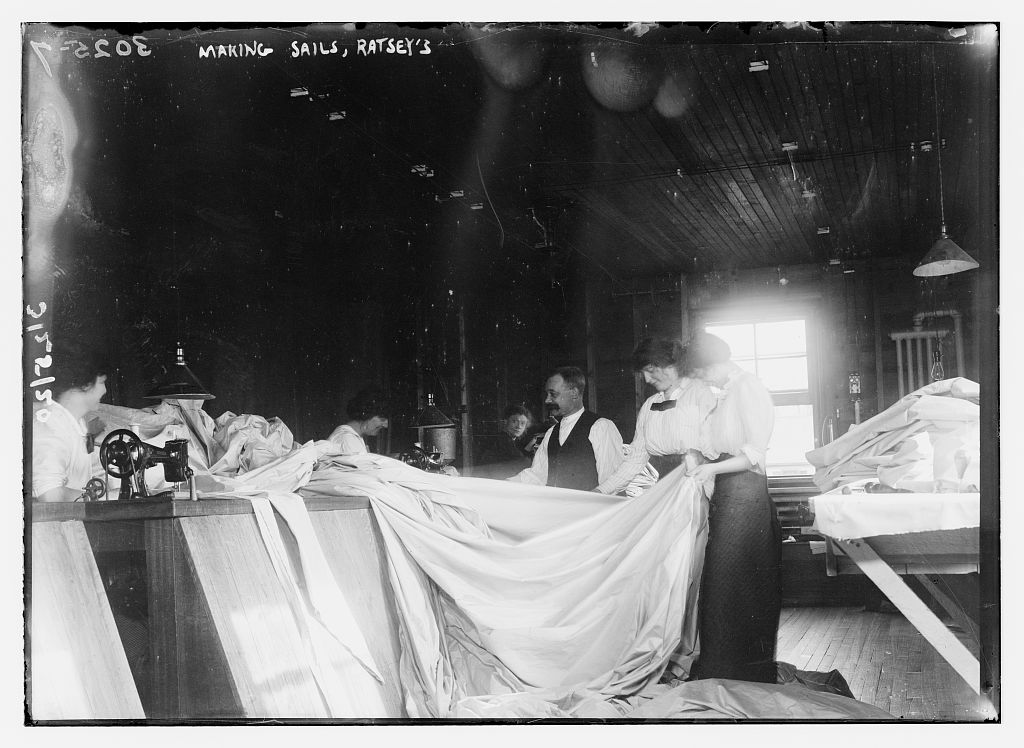
Ratsey's sail making company on City Island in 1914

Ratsey & Lapthorn is a British sail making company based in Cowes on the Isle of Wight, England and they had a loft in the United States. The loft was on Schofield Street on City Island, in the Bronx. It is one of the oldest and largest sail maker in the United States.

== History ==
The company was established in 1796. The United States branch was established in 1902. In 1958 Franklin Ratsey was chairman of the board.

The introduction of synthetic fabrics to sailmaking saw Ratsey and Lapthorn suffer commercial decline. By 2017, when the company was bought by Jim Hartley, annual turnover was just £79,000. Former fund manager Simon Brazier invested in the business, later becoming chairman, with Hartley running the operation day-to-day.

Ratsey and Lapthorn provided new sails for the restoration of Tally Ho.
