= Carlo Spirito =

Italian sailor

Personal information
- Nationality: Italian
- Born: 1 May 1920; Savona, Italy
- Died: 8 June 2009 (aged 89)

Sport
- Sport: Sailing

Carlo Spirito (1 May 1920 – 8 June 2009) was an Italian sailor. He competed at the 1952 Summer Olympics and the 1956 Summer Olympics.
