= Andrey Mazovka =

Soviet sailor

Personal information
- Nationality: Soviet
- Born: 16 June 1921 Saint Petersburg, Russia
- Died: 6 November 1967 (aged 46)

Sport
- Sport: Sailing

Andrey Mazovka (16 June 1921 – 6 November 1967) was a Soviet sailor. He competed at the 1952 Summer Olympics and the 1956 Summer Olympics.
