= Antonio Carattino =

Italian sailor (1923–2024)

Antonio Carattino (2 April 1923 – 3 July 2024) was an Italian sailor who competed in the 1952 Summer Olympics (finishing 9th in Dragon class), in the 1956 Summer Olympics (finishing 7th in the 5.5 m class), and finishing 5th in the 5.5 m class in the 1968 Summer Olympics. He died on 3 July 2024, at the age of 101.

== Family sport ==
Antonio Carattino spent his whole life as a sailor in the open water. Two of his older brothers, Domenico and Giuseppe, also competed in sailing at the Olympics.
