= Sailing at the 1932 Summer Olympics =

Sailing at the Games of the X Olympiad
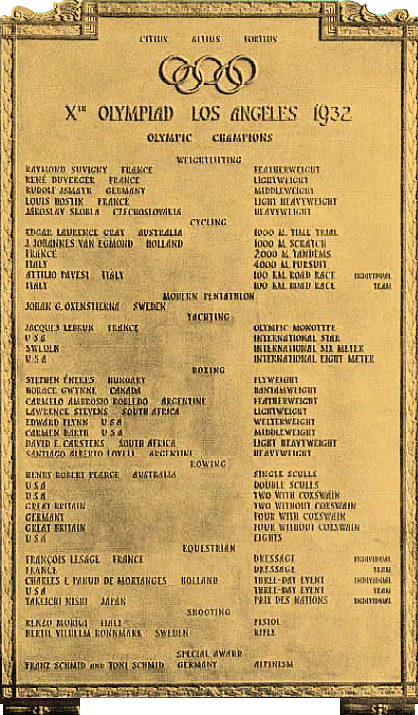
- Xth Olympiad Los Angeles Bronze tablet Yachting
- Venues: Los Angeles Harbor
- Dates: First race: 5 August 1932; Last race: 12 August 1932
- Competitors: 57 from 11 nations
- Boats: 23

Sailing/Yachting is an Olympic sport starting from the Games of the 1st Olympiad (1896 Olympics in Athens Greece). With the exception of 1904 and the canceled 1916 Summer Olympics, sailing has always been included on the Olympic schedule. The Sailing program of 1932 consisted of a total of four sailing classes (disciplines). For each class races were scheduled from 5–12 August directly off the Los Angeles Harbor on the Pacific Ocean.

== Venue ==
Los Angeles Harbor
- Angels Gate light
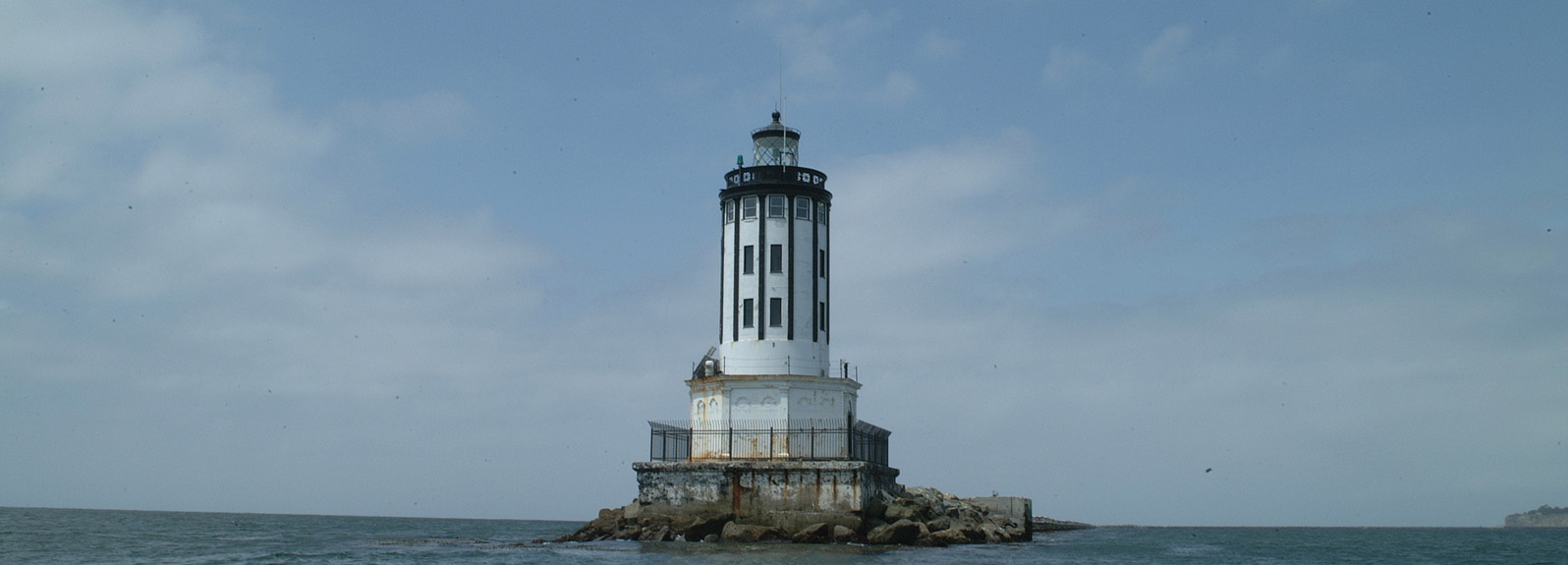
- Entrance to the Los Angeles Harbor. On the right the courses of the Snowbird were laid. To the left those of the other three classes.

- 1932 Olympic harbor

General information
- Status: Completed
- Type: Olympic harbor
- Location: San Pedro Breakwater, Los Angeles, California, United States
- Coordinates: 33°42′30.5″N 118°15′06.0″W
- Elevation: Sealevel
- Construction started: 1910
- Completed: 1913
- Opened: 1913
- Cost: $36,000
- Owner: US Coast Guard

=== Los Angeles Harbor ===
The Xth Olympiad Yachting events were raced in the Pacific Ocean directly off the Port of Los Angeles, over a course used for the past eight years in local yachting. This course was selected because of its suitability for wind conditions, its freedom from tides and swift currents, and the clearness of its waters, with the added advantage of offering spectators a full view from the Point Fermin headlands. Constant winds were assured as in this locality the trade wind comes up about mid-day, bringing with it a true westerly wind varying from eight to fifteen knots in velocity.

— Xth Olympiade Committee of the Games of Los Angeles, Official Report of the Games of the X Olympiad

=== Sea breeze ===
Due to the predicted Sea breeze in Los Angeles Harbor it was decided to race the Snowbirds in the lighter morning breezes. However, during the mornings there was virtually no wind at all. Therefore, some races of the Snowbird were sailed in the afternoon in heavy conditions. Luckily no capsizing took place. It also gave issues for those sailors who were competing not only in the Snowbird but also in one of the other classes.

=== Course areas ===
The courses had been well prepared. The marks were laid by the United States Lighthouse Service in the form of large Government buoys, and kelp beds under the lee of Point Fermin were marked by the United States Navy Department as restricted area. Visiting yachts were kept at a safe distance from the racing boats by the US Coast Guard. Tows were arranged by the US Navy to and from Los Angeles Harbor to the race area's. On the Pacific side of the San Pedro Breakwater the Star, 6 Metre and 8 Metre yachts had their races. Those classes had to pass the Angels Gate light in order to reach the course area. The Snowbird stayed inside the breakwater to protect them from the ocean swell.

1932 Olympic Course Areas

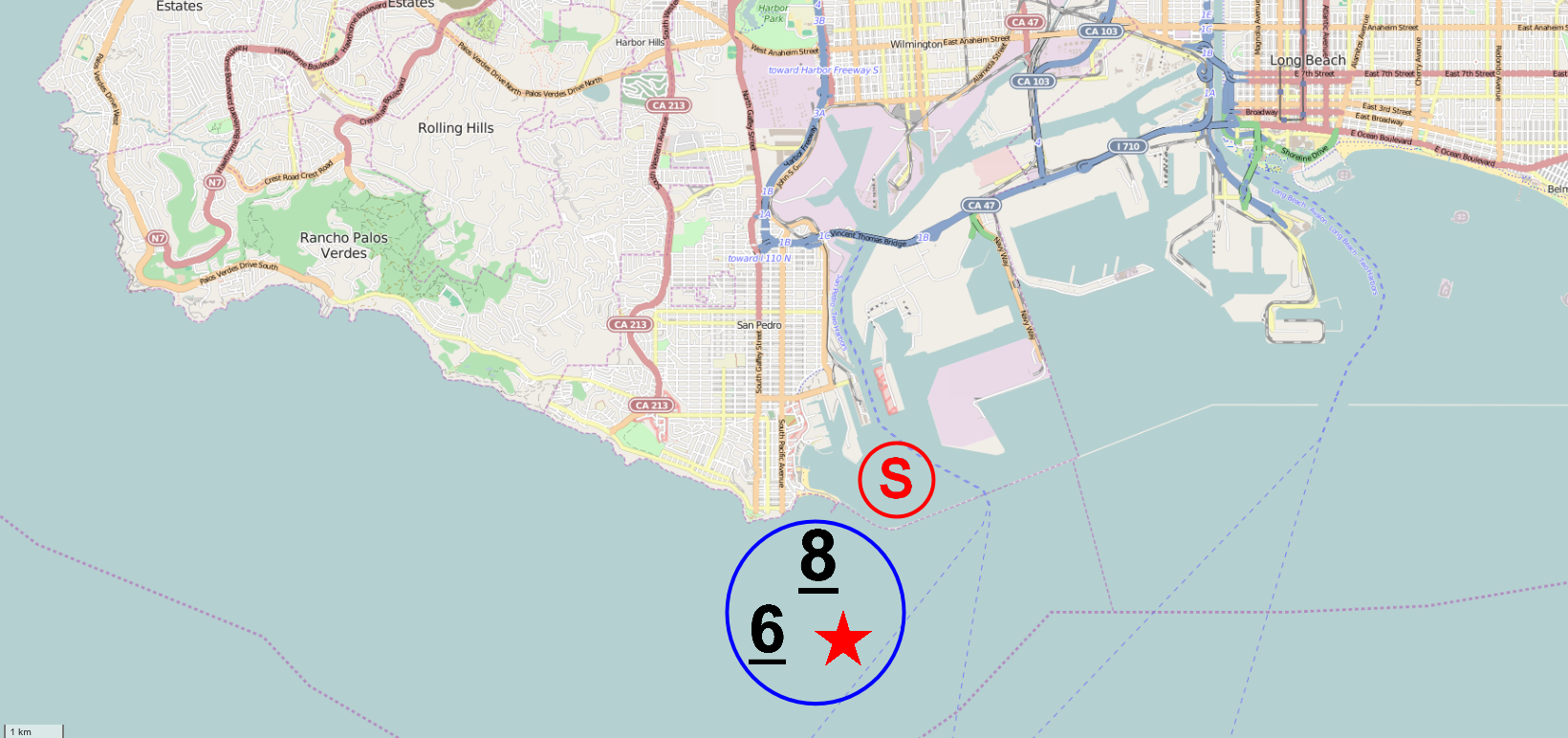
OpenStreetMap view of the current map of Los Angeles. Projected are the 1932 Olympic courses of the Snowbird (Red Area) and the Star, 6 Metre and 8 Metre (blue area).

== Competition ==
=== Overview ===
Continents	Countries	Classes	Boats	Male	Female
3	11	4	23	57	0

- However all events were gender independent it turned out to be a male only event.

=== Continents ===
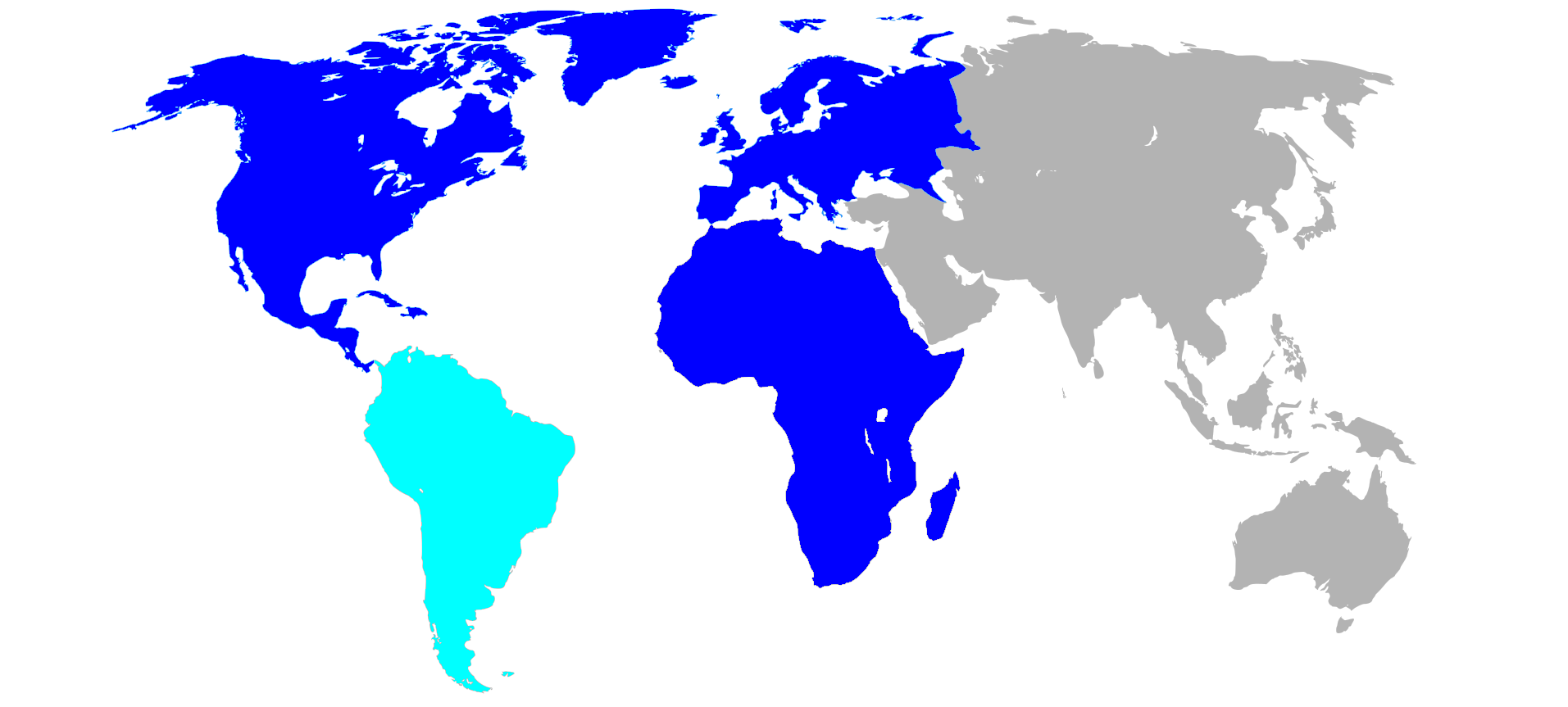
Map of Participating Sailing Continents at the 1932 Summer Olympics ● Green = Participating for the first time ● Blue = Participating ● Light Blue = Have previously participated

● Africa
● Europe
● North America

=== Countries ===
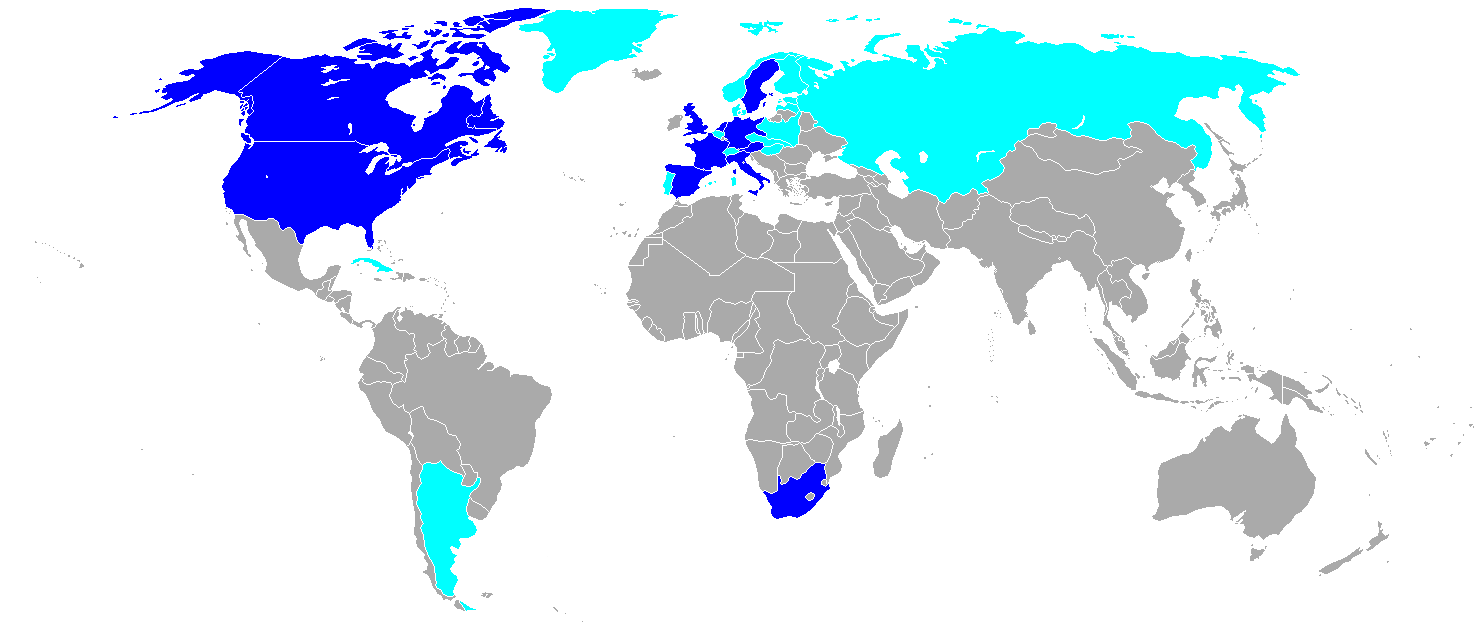
Map of Participating Sailing Countries at the 1932 Summer Olympics ● Green = Participating for the first time ● Blue = Participating ● Light Blue = Have previously participated

- Austria (1)
- Canada (13)
- France (3)
- Germany (1)
- Great Britain (2)
- Italy (1)
- Netherlands (2)
- South Africa (2)
- Spain (1)
- Sweden (7)
- United States (22)

=== Classes (equipment) ===
The 1932 Olympic classes
Class	Type	Venue	Event	Sailors	First OG	Olympics so far
Snowbird	Dinghy	Los Angeles		Max. 1 Max. 1 substitutes	1932	1
Star	Keelboat	Los Angeles		Max. 2 Max. 2 substitutes	1932	1
6 Metre	Keelboat	Los Angeles		Max. 5 Max. 5 substitutes	1908	6
8 Metre	Keelboat	Los Angeles		Max. 6 Max. 6 substitutes	1908	6
Legend: = Mixed gender event

== Race schedule ==
●	Opening ceremony	●	Event competitions	●	Event finals	●	Closing ceremony

Date	July		August													
Date	30 Sat	31 Sun	1 Mon	2 Tue	3 Wed	4 Thu	5 Fri	6 Sat	7 Sun	8 Mon	9 Tue	10 Wed	11 Thu	12 Fri	13 Sat	14 Sun
Sailing (actual)							● ● ● ●	● ● ● ●	●● ● ● ●	● ● ● ●	● ● ●	●● ● ●	●●● ●	●		
Total gold medals										8 Metre		6 Metre	Snowbird	Star		
Ceremonies	●															●

== Medal summary ==
Event	Gold	Silver	Bronze
1932: Snowbird	France (FRA); Jacques Lebrun	Netherlands (NED); Bob Maas	Spain (ESP); Santiago Amat
1932: Star	United States (USA); Gilbert Gray; Andrew Libano	Great Britain (GBR); George Colin Ratsey; Peter Jaffe	Sweden (SWE); Gunnar Asther; Daniel Sundén-Cullberg
1932: 6 Metre	Sweden (SWE); Tore Holm; Olle Åkerlund; Åke Bergqvist; Martin Hindorff	United States (USA); Robert Carlson; Temple Ashbrook; Frederic Conant; Emmett Davis; Donald Douglas; Charles Smith	Canada (CAN); Philip Rogers; Gardner Boultbee; Ken Glass; Jerry Wilson
1932: 8 Metre	United States (USA); Owen Churchill; John Biby; Alphonse Burnand; Kenneth Carey; William Cooper; Pierpont Davis; Carl Dorsey; John Huettner; Richard Moore; Alan Morgan; Robert Sutton; Thomas Webster	Canada (CAN); Ronald Maitland; Ernest Cribb; Peter Gordon; George Gyles; Harry Jones; Hubert Wallace	No further competitors

== Medal table ==
Rank	Nation	Gold	Silver	Bronze	Total
1	United States	2	1	0	3
2	Sweden	1	0	1	2
3	France	1	0	0	1
4	Canada	0	1	1	2
5	Great Britain	0	1	0	1
5	Netherlands	0	1	0	1
7	Spain	0	0	1	1
Totals (7 entries)		4	4	3	11

== Notes ==
=== Star ===
The 1932 Olympics featured for the first time the Star as Olympic discipline. This turned out to be so far the longest run for a sailing discipline in the Olympics. The Star was an Olympic class from 1932 to 2012 with the exception of 1976.

=== Snowbird ===
The USOC proposed to discontinue the 12' Dinghy in favor of a small V-bottom Catboat locally known as the Snowbird as the single handed one design class. This proposal was approved by the IYRU and IOC. The locally available Snowbirds were equipped with new masts, sails and rigging.

=== Medical assistance ===
For medical incidents during the Yachting events a United States Navy boat and a US Coast Guard boat were on duty during the races. This boats were equipped with an inhalator and crew furnished by the Los Angeles Fire Department.

Seven local physicians provided voluntary service (in alphabetical order):

- Edward G. Eisen, M.D., Head Physician
- Stanley Boller, M.D.
- J. Park Dougall, M.D.
- K. E. Kretzschmar, M.D.
- G. A. Laubersheimer, M.D.
- Wayland A. Morrison, M.D.
- Ewald Werner, M.D.

== Other information ==
=== Sailors in multiple disciplines ===
Three sailors attempted to sail in the Snownbird and the Star. This was a challenge since the schedule of the Snowbird was modified due to the light air weather conditions in the mornings of the regattas.

- George Colin Ratsey (GBR)
- Bob Maas (NED)
- Cecil Goodricke (RSA)

=== Sailing ===
During the Sailing regattas at the 1932 Summer Olympics among others the following persons were competing in the various classes:

- France, Jacques Lebrun, French boat designer and technical director of the French national association
- Netherlands, Bob Maas, Dutch long time Star sailor
- United States, United States yachtsman and American industrialist Donald Wills Douglas, Jr. in the 6 Metre
- United States, United States yachting legend and inventor of the Swimfin, Owen Churchill in the 8 Metre
Sailors at the 1932 Olympic Games
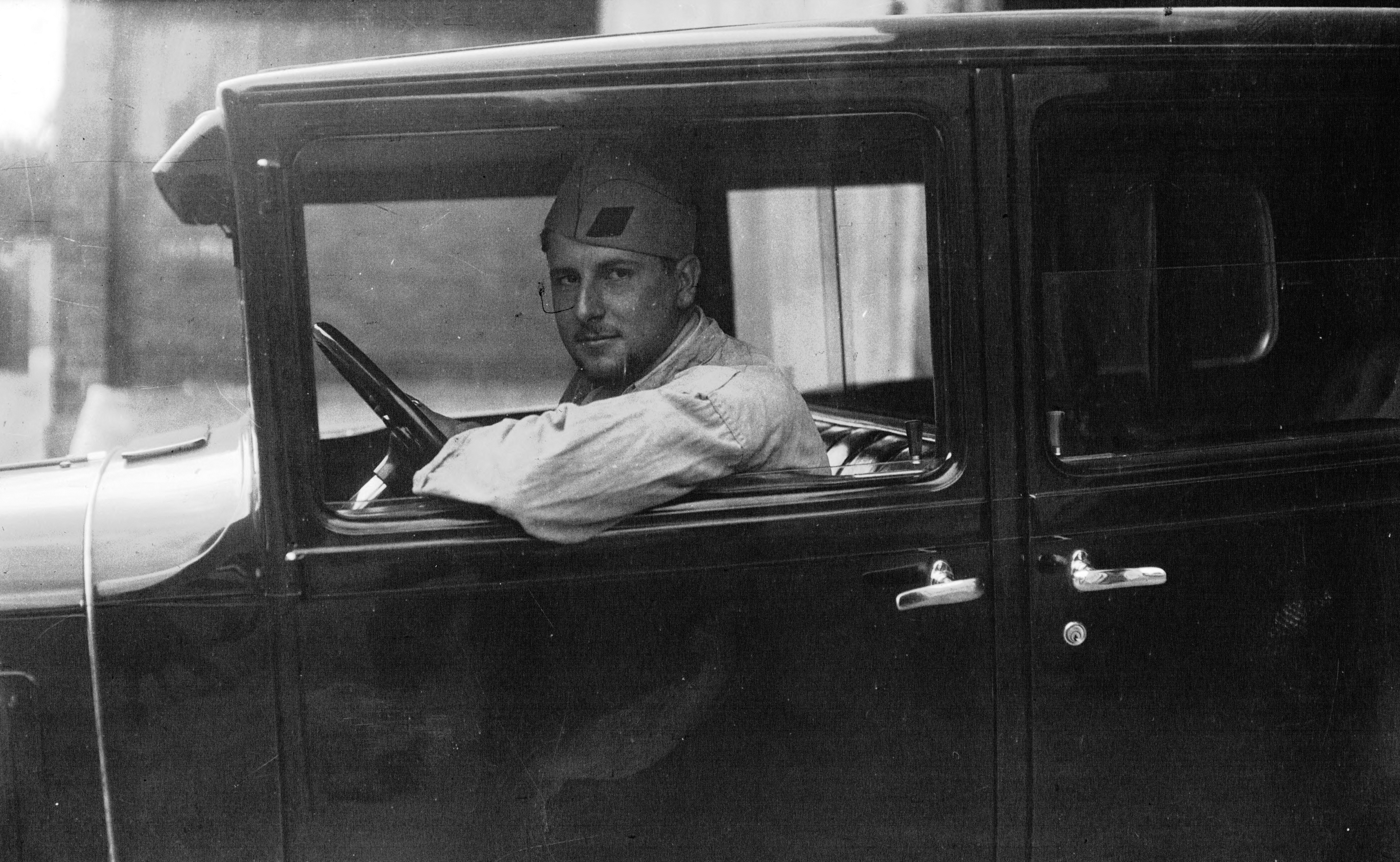
Jacques Lebrun

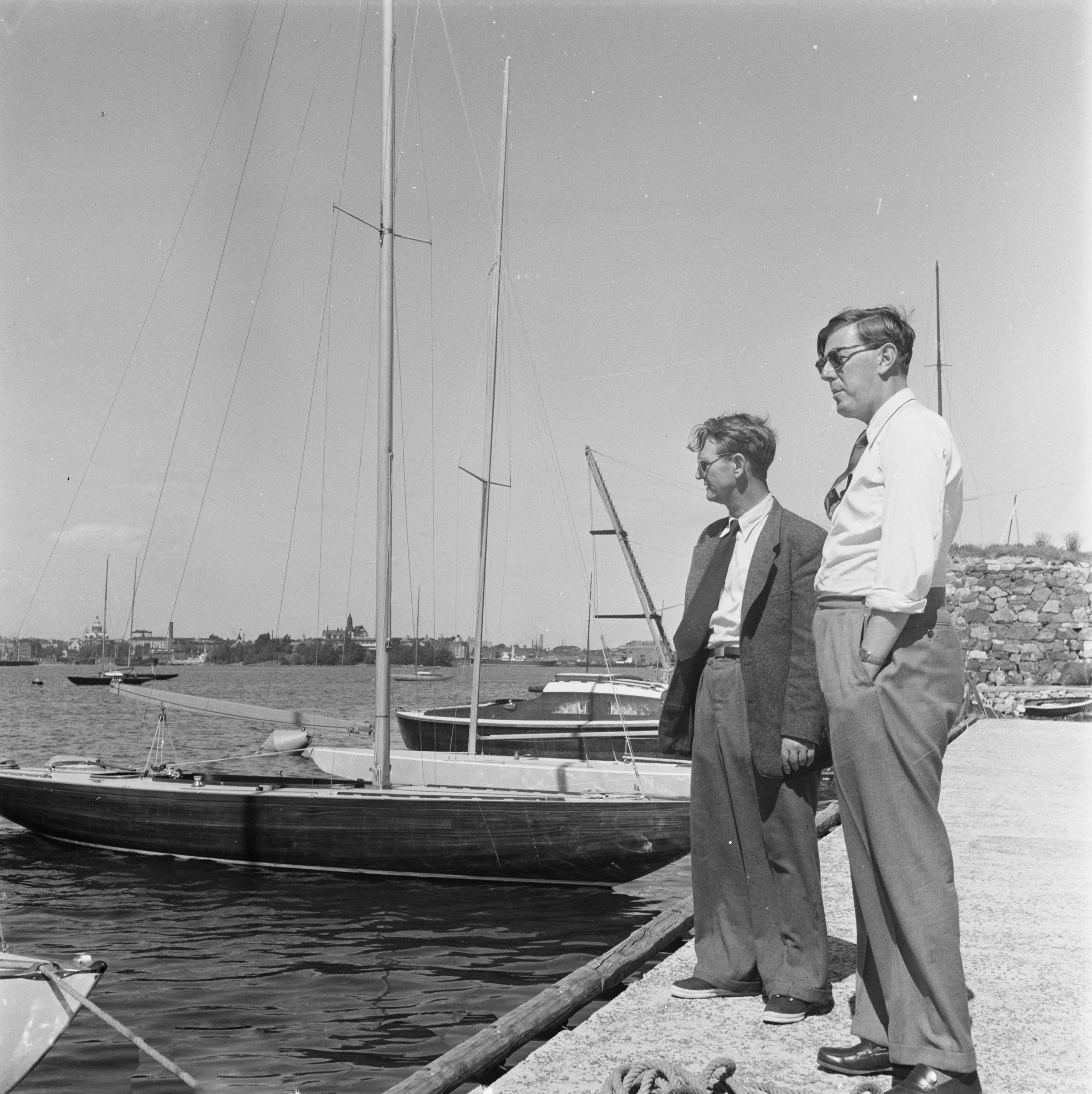
Bob Maas (left)

Santiago Amat
