= Sailing at the 1932 Summer Olympics – 6 Metre =

6 Metre at the Games of the X Olympiad
- Line drawing of the 6 Metre
- Venue: Los Angeles Harbor
- Dates: First race: August 5, 1932; Last race: August 11, 1932
- Competitors: 14 from 3 nations
- Teams: 3

Medalists
1st place, gold medalist(s)		Tore Holm; Martin Hindorff; Olle Åkerlund; Åke Bergqvist	Sweden
2nd place, silver medalist(s)		Robert Carlson; Temple Ashbrook; Frederic Conant; Charles Smith; Donald Wills Douglas Jr. Emmett Davis	United States
3rd place, bronze medalist(s)		Philip Rogers; Jerry Wilson; Gardner Boultbee; Ken Glass	Canada

The 6 Metre was a sailing event on the Sailing at the 1932 Summer Olympics program in Los Angeles Harbor. Six races were scheduled plus possible tie breakers. 15 sailors, on 3 boats, from 3 nation competed.

== Race schedule ==
●	Event competitions	●	Final race

Date	August					
Date	5th Fri	6th Sat	7th Sun	8th Mon	9th Tue	10th Wed
6 Metre	●	●	●	●	●	●
Total gold medals						1

== Course area and course configuration ==
The courses had been well prepared. The marks were laid by the United States Lighthouse Service in the form of large Government. Visiting yachts were kept at a safe distance from the racing boats by the US Coast Guard. Tows were arranged by the US Navy to and from Los Angeles Harbor to the race area. The 6 Metre sailed outside the breakwater.

1932 Olympic Course Areas and Course Configurations

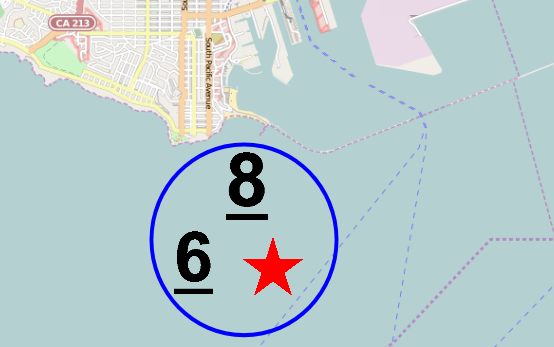
OpenStreetMap view of the current map of Los Angeles. Projected are the 1932 Olympic courses of the 6 Metre (Blue Area).

6 Metre course (8nm).

6 Metre course (10nm).

6 Metre course (8nm).

6 Metre course (6nm).

== Weather conditions ==
Date	Race	Wind	Wind direction	Details
5-AUG-1932	1st Race	Heavy		
6-AUG-1932	2nd Race	Light		Freshening to
7-AUG-1932	3rd Race	Fresh		Increased to 20 knots (10 m/s)
8-AUG-1932	4th Race	20 knots (10 m/s)		
9-AUG-1932	5th Race	Light		
10-AUG-1932	6th Race	Light		Freshening

== Final results ==
Rank	Country	Helmsman	Crew	Boat	Race 1		Race 2		Race 3		Race 4		Race 5		Race 6		Total
Rank	Country	Helmsman	Crew	Boat	Pos.	Pts.	Pos.	Pts.	Pos.	Pts.	Pos.	Pts.	Pos.	Pts.	Pos.	Pts.	Total
1st place, gold medalist(s)	Sweden	Tore Holm	Martin Hindorff; Olle Åkerlund; Åke Bergqvist	Bissbi	1	3	1	3	1	3	1	3	1	3	1	3	18
2nd place, silver medalist(s)	United States	Robert Carlson	Temple Ashbrook; Frederic Conant; Emmett Davis; Donald Wills Douglas Jr. Charles Smith	Gallant	2	2	2	2	2	2	2	2	2	2	2	2	12
3rd place, bronze medalist(s)	Canada	Philip Rogers	Gardner Boultbee; Ken Glass; Jerry Wilson	Caprice	3	1	3	1	3	1	3	1	DNS	0	DNS	0	6

Legend: DNS – Did not start;

== Daily standings ==
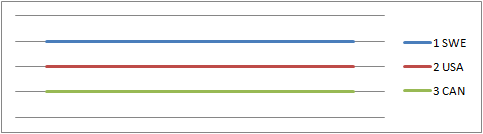
Graph showing the daily standings in the 6 Metre during the 1932 Summer Olympics

== Notes ==
- For this event one yacht from each country, crewed by a maximum of 5 amateurs (maximum number of substitutes 5) was allowed.
- This event was a gender independent event. However it turned out that only men participated.

== Other information ==
During the Sailing regattas at the 1932 Summer Olympics among others the following persons were competing in the 6 Metre:

6 Metre victors at the 1932 Olympic Games
Tore Holm, Martin Hindorff
Olle Åkerlund & Åke Bergqvist (SWE)
