= 6 Metre =

Class of racing yachts

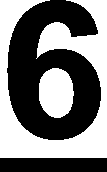
- Class symbol

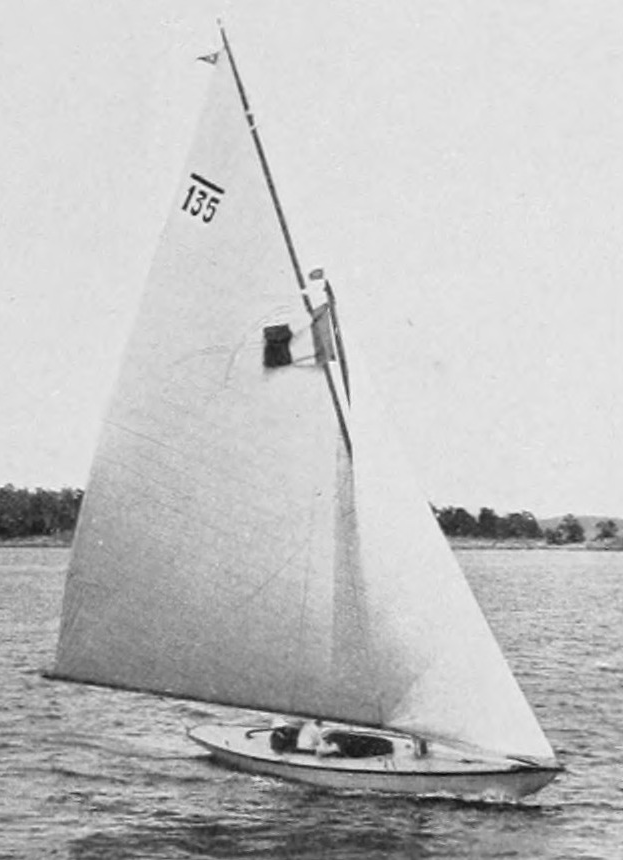
- French Mac Miche – gold medalist at the 1912 Summer Olympics in Stockholm

Development
- Year: 1907 (rule design)
- Design: Development class

The International Six Metre class is a class of classic racing yachts. Sixes are a construction class, meaning that the boats are not identical but are all designed to meet specific measurement formula, in this case International rule. At their heyday, Sixes were the most important international yacht racing class, and they are still raced around the world. "Six metre" in class name does not, somewhat confusingly, refer to length of the boat, but product of the formula; 6mR boats are about 10–11 m (33–36 ft) long.

== History ==
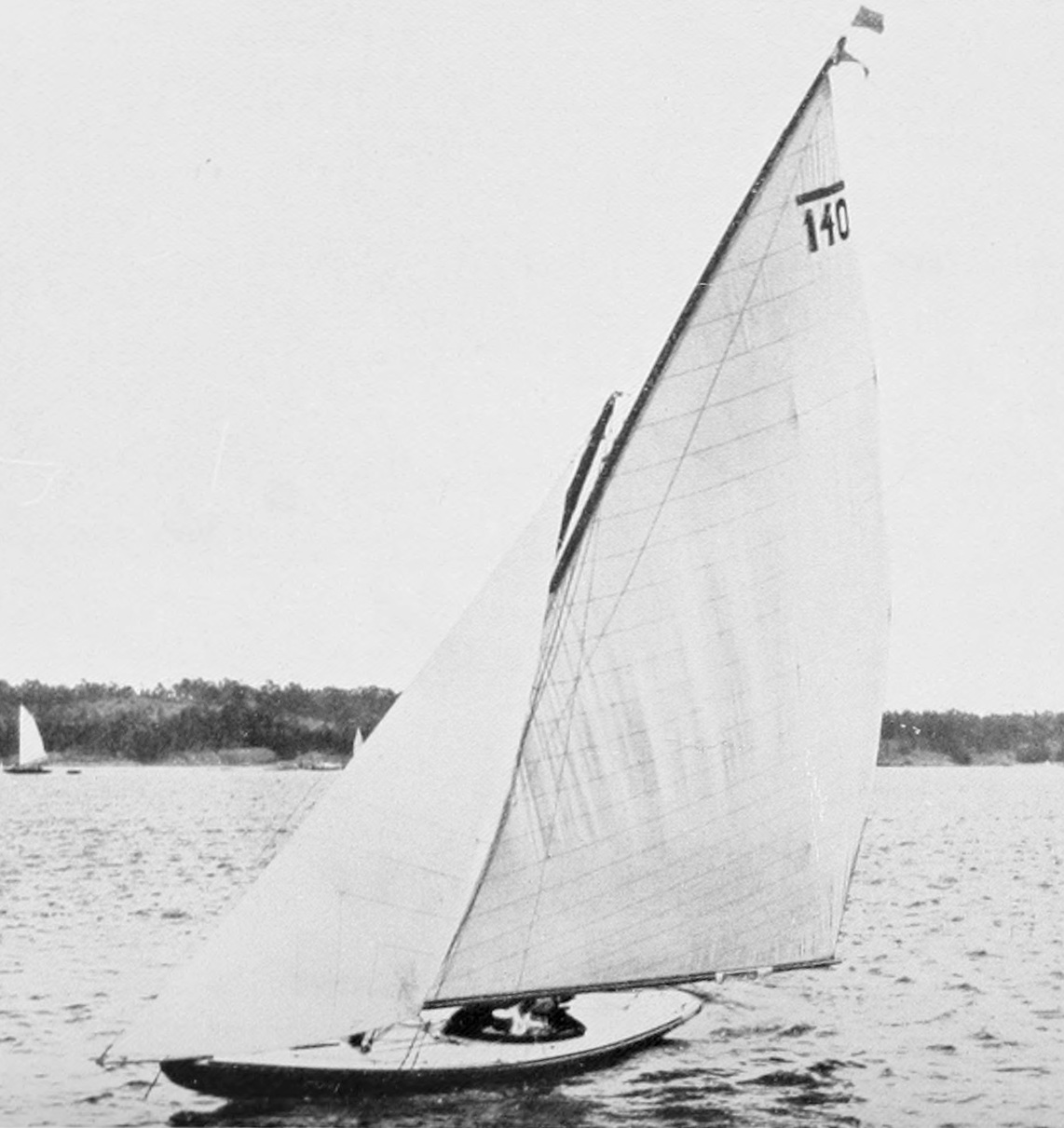
Danish Nurdug II. Silver medalist at the 1912 Summer Olympics in Stockholm.

The International rule was set up in 1907 to replace numerous handicap systems which were often local, or at best national, and often also fairly simple, producing extreme boats which were fast but lightly constructed and impractical. The Six Metre class was not the smallest rating established under the rule, but was nonetheless the most popular, and they were chosen as an Olympic class in 1908. However, it was not until revision of the Rule in 1920 when the Sixes really became a popular international racing class. The 1920s and '30s were 'golden age' of the International Rule boats and Sixes were still the most popular class, attracting top sailors and designers to compete for prestigious trophies such as Scandinavian Gold Cup and Olympic medals.

Alexander Robertson & Sons produced a total of five Six Metre yachts between 1921 and 1953. In 1937 their young naval architect David Boyd designed the sleek Six Metre racing yacht Circe, which was described by many as the most successful racing yacht produced at the yard. Mr J. Herbert Thom, one of the Clyde's best helmsmen sailed the yacht with tremendous success in America in 1938 and brought back the Seawanhaka Cup, which was successfully defended in home waters the following year. In later years Circe represented Russia in the 1952 Summer Olympics.

However, Six Metres were criticized as having become too expensive and towards the end of the 1930s they became more so, making the class too exclusive. Under what is known as the Second International rule (1920–33) the yachts had gone from being less than 9.1 metres (30 ft) in overall length to being almost 12 metres (40 ft). By 1929, the 5 Metre class was becoming more popular as a cheaper and smaller alternative for Sixes, but the final blow was creation of the International 5.5 Metre class in 1949. The 5.5 Metres soon replaced the Six Metres as the premier international racing class, and after the 1952 Helsinki Olympics Sixes were dropped from Olympic regattas. The Gold Cup was also transferred to the 5.5 m class from 1953 onwards.

Despite this, the class continued to exist, and new boats were made utilising the newest contemporary technologies, although sparingly. During the 1980s, many old sailboat classes experienced revival of interest and Sixes were at the forefront of this development. The Class has undergone a renaissance which has continued to this day, with many old yachts restored or rebuilt to racing condition. Six Metre competition is thriving once again with active fleets in Europe, North America and Scandinavia. Performance differences between classic and modern era Sixes are usually small and they can be raced together.

In 2019 the International Six Metre Association launched an online archive website, allowing researchers around the world to access historical information about the class.

== Events ==
=== Olympics ===
Games	Gold	Silver	Bronze
1908 London	Great Britain; Gilbert Laws; Thomas McMeekin; Charles Crichton	Belgium; Léon Huybrechts; Louis Huybrechts; Henri Weewauters	France; Henri Arthus; Louis Potheau; Pierre Rabot
1912 Stockholm	France; Gaston Thubé; Amédée Thubé; Jacques Thubé	Denmark; Hans Meulengracht-Madsen; Steen Herschend; Sven Thomsen	Sweden; Eric Sandberg; Otto Aust; Harald Sandberg
1920 Antwerp; 1907 rule	Belgium; Émile Cornellie; Frédéric Bruynseels; Florimond Cornellie	Norway; Einar Torgersen; Leif Erichsen; Andreas Knudsen	Norway; Henrik Agersborg; Einar Berntsen; Trygve Pedersen
1920 Antwerp; 1919 rule	Norway; Andreas Brecke; Paal Kaasen; Ingolf Rød	Belgium; Léon Huybrechts; Charles Van Den Bussche; John Klotz	no further competitors
1924 Paris	Norway; Anders Lundgren; Christopher Dahl; Eugen Lunde	Denmark; Vilhelm Vett; Knud Degn; Christian Nielsen	Netherlands; Johan Carp; Anthonij Guépin; Jan Vreede
1928 Amsterdam	Norway; Johan Anker; Erik Anker; Håkon Bryhn; Crown Prince Olav	Denmark; Vilhelm Vett; Aage Høy-Petersen; Niels Otto Møller; Peter Schlütter	Estonia; Nikolai Vekšin; Andreas Faehlmann; Georg Faehlmann; Eberhard Vogdt; William von Wirén
1932 Los Angeles	Sweden; Tore Holm; Olle Åkerlund; Åke Bergqvist; Martin Hindorff	United States; Robert Carlson; Temple Ashbrook; Frederic Conant; Emmett Davis; Donald Douglas; Charles Smith	Canada; Philip Rogers; Gardner Boultbee; Ken Glass; Jerry Wilson
1936 Berlin	Great Britain; Christopher Boardman; Miles Bellville; Russell Harmer; Charles Leaf; Leonard Martin	Norway; Magnus Konow; Karsten Konow; Fredrik Meyer; Vaadjuv Nyqvist; Alf Tveten	Sweden; Sven Salén; Lennart Ekdahl; Martin Hindorff; Torsten Lord; Dagmar Salén
1948 London	United States; Herman Whiton; Alfred Loomis; Michael Mooney; James Smith; James Weekes	Argentina; Enrique Sieburger, Sr. Emilio Homps; Rodolfo Rivademar; Rufino Rodríguez de la Torre; Enrique Sieburger, Jr. Julio Sieburger	Sweden; Tore Holm; Carl Robert Ameln; Martin Hindorff; Torsten Lord; Gösta Salén
1952 Helsinki	United States; Herman Whiton; Everard Endt; John Morgan; Eric Ridder; Julian Roosevelt; Emelyn Whiton	Norway; Finn Ferner; Tor Arneberg; Johan Ferner; Erik Heiberg; Carl Mortensen	Finland; Ernst Westerlund; Ragnar Jansson; Jonas Konto; Rolf Turkka; Paul Sjöberg
