= Sailing at the 1932 Summer Olympics – 8 Metre =

8 Metre at the Games of the X Olympiad
- Line drawing of the 8 Metre
- Venue: Los Angeles Harbor
- Dates: First race: August 5, 1932; Last race: August 9, 1932
- Competitors: 18 from 2 nations
- Teams: 2

Medalists
1st place, gold medalist(s)		Owen Churchill, John Biby, Alphonse Burnand, Kenneth Carey, William Cooper, Pierpont Davis, Carl Dorsey, John Huettner, Richard Moore, Alan Morgan, Robert Sutton & Thomas Webster	United States
2nd place, silver medalist(s)		Ronald Maitland, Ernest Cribb, Peter Gordon, George Gyles, Harry Jones & Hubert Wallace	Canada

The 8 Metre was a sailing event on the Sailing at the 1932 Summer Olympics program in Los Angeles Harbor. Four races were scheduled plus possible tie breakers. 18 sailors, on 2 boats, from 2 nations competed.

== Race schedule ==
●	Event competitions	●	Final race

Date	August			
Date	5th Fri	6th Sat	7th Sun	8th Mon
8 Metre	●	●	●	●
Total gold medals				1

== Course area and course configuration ==
The courses had been well prepared. The marks were laid by the United States Lighthouse Service in the form of large Government. Visiting yachts were kept at a safe distance from the racing boats by the US Coast Guard. Tows were arranged by the US Navy to and from Los Angeles Harbor to the race area. The 8 Metre sailed outside the breakwater.

1932 Olympic Course Areas and Course Configurations

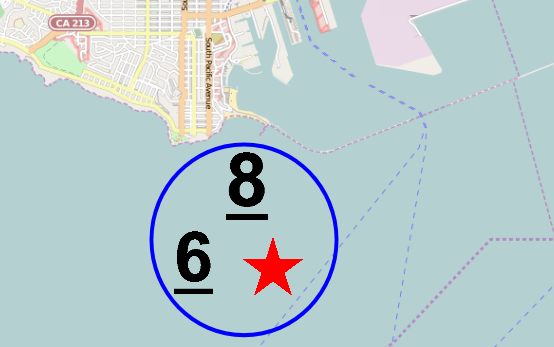
OpenStreetMap view of the current map of Los Angeles. Projected are the 1932 Olympic courses of the 8 Metre (Blue Area).

8 Metre course (8nm).

8 Metre course used (10nm).

8 Metre course used (8nm).

8 Metre course (6nm).

== Weather conditions ==
Date	Race	Wind	Wind direction	Details
5-AUG-1932	1st Race	Heavy		
6-AUG-1932	2nd Race	Light		Freshening to
7-AUG-1932	3rd Race	Fresh		Increased to 20 knots (10 m/s)
8-AUG-1932	4th Race	20 knots (10 m/s)		

== Final results ==
Rank	Country	Helmsman	Crew	Boat	Race 1		Race 2		Race 3		Race 4		Total
Rank	Country	Helmsman	Crew	Boat	Pos.	Pts.	Pos.	Pts.	Pos.	Pts.	Pos.	Pts.	Total
1st place, gold medalist(s)	United States	Owen Churchill	John Biby, Alphonse Burnand, Kenneth Carey, William Cooper, Pierpont Davis, Carl Dorsey, John Huettner, Richard Moore, Alan Morgan, Robert Sutton & Thomas Webster	Angelita	1	2	1	2	1	2	1	2	8
2nd place, silver medalist(s)	Canada	Ronald Maitland	Ernest Cribb; Peter Gordon; George Gyles; Harry Jones; Hubert Wallace	Santa Maria	2	1	2	1	2	1	2	1	4

== Daily standings ==
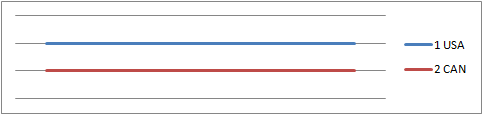
Graph showing the daily standings in the 8 Metre during the 1932 Summer Olympics

== Notes ==
- For this event one yacht from each country, crewed by a maximum of 6 amateurs (maximum number of substitutes 6) was allowed.
- This event was a gender independent event. However it turned out that only men participated.

== Other information ==
During the Sailing regattas at the 1932 Summer Olympics among others the following persons were competing in the 8 Metre:

8 Metre victors at the 1932 Olympic Games
Owen Churchill, John Biby, Alphonse Burnand, Kenneth Carey, William Cooper, Pierpont Davis,
Carl Dorsey, John Huettner, Richard Moore, Alan Morgan, Robert Sutton & Thomas Webster (USA)
