= Cecil Goodricke =

South African sailor

Personal information
- Full name: Cecil Fairfax Goodricke
- Nationality: South African
- Born: 20 March 1883 Durban, Colony of Natal
- Died: 6 August 1944 (aged 61) Los Angeles, United States

Sport

Sailing career
- Class(es): Snowbird, Star
Competition record
Sailing
Representing South Africa
Olympic Games
1932 Los Angeles	Snowbird (11th)
1932 Los Angeles	Star (7th)
- Updated on 8 May 2015

Cecil Fairfax Goodricke (1883–1944) was a sailor from South Africa, who represented his country at the 1932 Summer Olympics in the Snowbird as well as in the Star in Los Angeles, US.

== Sources ==
- "Cecil Goodricke Bio, Stats, and Results". Olympic Sports. Sports-Reference.com. Archived from the original on 18 April 2020.
