= Leuchars (surname) =

Leuchars is a surname. Notable people with the surname include:

- Anne Leuchars, British broadcaster and journalist
- Sir George Leuchars, South African politician
- John Leuchars (1852–1920), British sailor
- Lucy Leuchars (died 1847), English case manufacturer
- Wilfrid Leuchars (1880–1942), British sailor

== See also ==
- Leuchars a town in Fife, Scotland
