= Robert Carlson =

Robert Carlson or Bob Carlson may refer to:

- Robert H. Carlson (died 1993), American politician
- Robert James Carlson (born 1944), American clergyman of the Roman Catholic Church
- Robert Carlson (sailor) (1905–1965), American sailor who competed in the 1932 Summer Olympics
- Bob Carlson (1913–2000), American college football and college baseball player and coach
