= Karl-Einar Sjögren =

Swedish sailor

Personal information
- Full name: Karl-Einar Fridolf Sjögren
- Nationality: Swedish
- Born: 29 September 1871 Stockholm, Sweden
- Died: 6 May 1956 (aged 84) Stockholm, Sweden

Sport

Sailing career
- Class: 6 Metre

Karl-Einar Fridolf Sjögren (29 September 1871 – 6 May 1956) was a sailor from Sweden, who represented his native country at the 1908 Summer Olympics in Ryde, Great Britain. Sjögren took the 5th place in the 6 Metre.
