= Raymond Bauwens =

Belgian sailor

Personal information
- Nationality: Belgian
- Born: 4 February 1902 Ostend
- Died: 15 August 1985 (aged 83) Ostend

Sailing career
- Sport: Sailing
- Class: 6 Metre
Competition record
Sailing
Representing Belgium
Olympic Games
4th	1920 Ostend	6 Metre
- Updated on 7 February 2015

Raymond Bauwens (born 4 February 1902) was a sailor from Belgium, who represented his native country at the 1920 Summer Olympics in Ostend, Belgium. Bauwens took the 4th place in the 6 Metre.

== Sources ==
- "Raymond Bauwens Bio, Stats, and Results". Olympic Sports. Sports-Reference.com. Archived from the original on 18 April 2020.
- Belgium Olympic Committee, ed. (1957). Olympic Games 1920 – Officiel Report (PDF). Archived from the original (PDF) on 27 September 2007.
