= Reg Dixon (sailor) =

Canadian sailor (1900–1982)

Personal information
- Full name: Reginald Manning Dixon
- Nationality: Canadian
- Born: April 1, 1900 Smith Township, Peterborough County (now Selwyn)
- Died: December 6, 1982 (aged 82) Toronto

Sailing career
- Sport: Sailing
- Class: Snowbird
Competition record
Sailing
Representing Canada
Olympic Games
1932 Los Angeles	Snowbird (5th)
1936 Kiel	O-Jolle (16th)
- Updated on 8 May 2015

Reginald Manning Dixon was a sailor from Canada, who represented his country in the 1932 Summer Olympics in the Snowbird in Los Angeles, United States as well as in the 1936 Summer Olympics in the O-Jolle in Kiel, Germany.

== Sources ==
- "Reg Dixon Bio, Stats, and Results". Olympic Sports. Sports-Reference.com. Archived from the original on 18 April 2020.
