= Reg Dixon =

Reg Dixon may refer to:

- Reg Dixon (sailor)
- Reg Dixon (comedian)

== See also ==
- Reginald Dixon, English theatre organist
