= Sailing at the 1920 Summer Olympics – 6 Metre =

6 Metre at the Games of the VII Olympiad
- Line drawings of the 6 Metre (1907 Rule and 1919 Rule)
- Venue: Belgium, Ostend
- Dates: First race: 7 July 1920; Last race: 9 July 1920
- Competitors: 18 from 2 nations
- Teams: 6

Medalists
1st place, gold medalist(s)		(1907 Rule); Émile Cornellie, Frédéric Bruynseels, Florimond Cornellie	Belgium
1st place, gold medalist(s)		(1919 Rule); Andreas Brecke, Paal Kaasen, Ingolf Rød	Norway
2nd place, silver medalist(s)		(1907 Rule); Einar Torgersen, Leif Erichsen, Andreas Knudsen	Norway
2nd place, silver medalist(s)		(1919 Rule); Léon Huybrechts, Charles Van Den Bussche, John Klotz	Belgium
3rd place, bronze medalist(s)		(1907 Rule); Henrik Agersborg, Einar Berntsen, Trygve Pedersen	Norway

The 6 Metre was a sailing event on the Sailing at the 1920 Summer Olympics program in Ostend. Two type of 6 Metre classes were used. Four races were scheduled in each type. In total 18 sailors, on 6 boats, from 2 nation entered in the 6 Metre.

== Race schedule ==
●	Opening ceremony	●	Event competitions	●	Event finals	●	Closing ceremony

Date	July			
Date	7th Wed	8th Thu	9th Fri	10th Sat
6 Metre	●	●	●	●
Total gold medals				2

== Course area ==
6 Metre 1920 Olympic Course Areas

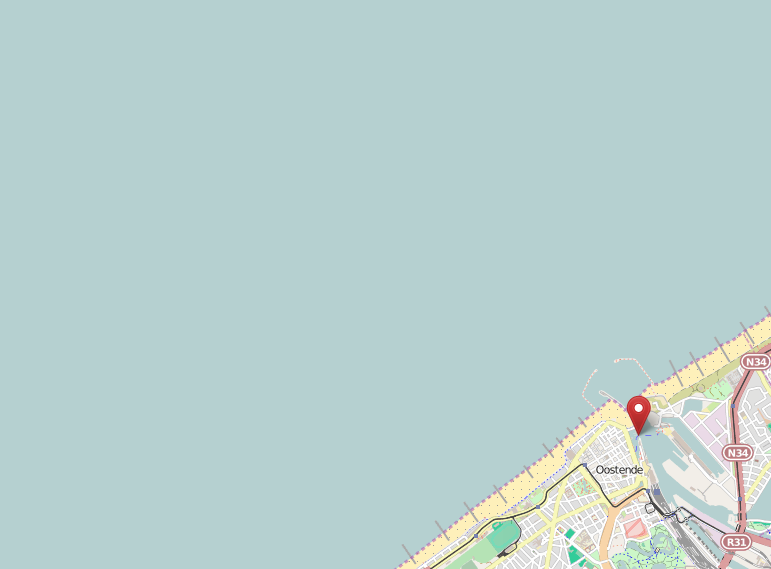
Ostend, Belgium

== Weather conditions ==
Date	Max temperature	Wind speed	Average wind direction
7 July 1920	Unknown		
8 July 1920	Unknown		
9 July 1920	Unknown		

== Final results ==
The 1920 Olympic scoring system was used. All competitors were male.

=== 6 Metre International Rule 1907 ===
Rank	Country	Helmsman	Crew	Boat	Race 1		Race 2		Race 3		Race 4		Total
Rank	Country	Helmsman	Crew	Boat	Pos.	Pts.	Pos.	Pts.	Pos.	Pts.	Pos.	Pts.	Total
1st place, gold medalist(s)	Belgium	Émile Cornellie	Frédéric Bruynseels; Florimond Cornellie	Edelweiß	2	2	1	1	2	2	-	-	5
2nd place, silver medalist(s)	Norway	Einar Torgersen	Leif Erichsen; Andreas Knudsen	Marmi	DNF	4	2	2	1	1	-	-	7
3rd place, bronze medalist(s)	Norway	Henrik Agersborg	Einar Berntsen; Trygve Pedersen	Stella	1	1	4	4	4	4	1	1	10
4	Belgium	Louis Depière	Raymond Bauwens; Willy Valcke	Suzy	3	3	3	3	3	3	2	2	11

Legend: DNF – Did not finish;

=== Daily standings ===
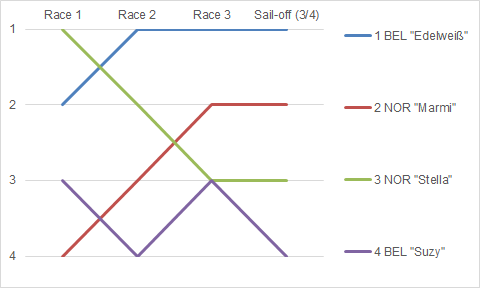
Graph showing the daily standings in the 6 Metre (1907) during the 1920 Summer Olympics

=== 6 Metre International Rule 1919 ===
Rank	Country	Helmsman	Crew	Boat	Race 1		Race 2		Race 3		Total
Rank	Country	Helmsman	Crew	Boat	Pos.	Pts.	Pos.	Pts.	Pos.	Pts.	Total
1st place, gold medalist(s)	Norway	Andreas Brecke	Paal Kaasen; Ingolf Rød	Jo	1	1	1	1	2	2	4
2nd place, silver medalist(s)	Belgium	Léon Huybrechts	Charles Van Den Bussche; John Klotz	Tan-Fe-Pah	2	2	2	2	1	1	5

=== Daily standings ===
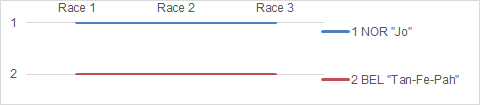
Graph showing the daily standings in the 6 Metre (1919) during the 1920 Summer Olympics

== Notes ==
- Since the official documentation of the 1920 Summer Olympics was written in 1957 many facts did disappear in time.
- Two type of 6 Metre classes were used. Those measured under the International Rule 1907 and one under the International Rule 1919.

== Other information ==
=== Sailors ===
During the Sailing regattas at the 1920 Summer Olympics the following persons were competing:

6 Metre sailors at the 1920 Olympic Games
Léon Huybrechts (BEL)
