= Los Angeles Yacht Club =

Social and boating club in San Pedro, California

- Burgee
- Short name: LAYC
- Founded: 1901
- Location: 285 Whalers Walk San Pedro, California 90731
- Website: www.layc.org

Los Angeles Yacht Club is a yacht club located in San Pedro, Los Angeles (United States). The club is a charter member of the Southern California Yachting Association.

== History ==
Los Angeles Yacht Club was founded in 1901 as South Coast Yacht Club. in 1920 South Coast Yacht Club changed its name to Los Angeles Yacht Club. Los Angeles Motor Boat Club and Los Angeles Yacht Club (LAYC) consolidated its membership in 1922 and moved into a shared facility of the California Yacht Club. In 1937 LAYC moved from the California Yacht Club facility into a "temporary" New England–style clubhouse in Fish Harbor, San Pedro where it remained for the next 56 years. LAYC moved in 1993 to its present location at Cabrillo Marina in San Pedro.

Los Angeles Yacht Club was the host club for the first Los Angeles-to-Honolulu transpacific yacht race (Transpac) held on June 11, 1906. LAYC members have continued to sail in and officiate the start of the Transpac race which is held every two years. Los Angeles Yacht Club also hosts the annual Pacific Coast Mercury Class Championship and the Port of Los Angeles Harbor Cup Cal Maritime Invitational Intercollegiate Regatta.

In addition to its mainland San Pedro clubhouse, Los Angeles Yacht Club maintains an outstation facility at Howland's Landing on Catalina Island, California.

== Sailors ==
Owen Churchill won the gold medal in the 8 metre class at the 1932 Summer Olympics, and his daughter Antonia Churchill competed at the 1936 Summer Olympics in the 8 metre class also.

Darby Metcalf won the Snipe worlds in 1940 and 1941.

James Cowie and Gordon Cowie won the Star World Championships in 1940 and George Fleitz with William Severance in 1941. George Fleitz won again the 1946 Worlds with Walter Krug.
