= Antonia Churchill =

American sailor (1919–2016)

Antonia Churchill-Lance (May 6, 1919 – January 19, 2016) was an American sailor who competed at the 1936 Summer Olympics in Berlin. In the 8 metre event, she finished tenth and last as a member of the American team led by her father, 1932 gold medalist Owen Churchill. Born in Los Angeles, California, she was a member of the Los Angeles Yacht Club, and attended UCLA.
