= Birger Gustafsson =

Swedish sailor

Personal information
- Full name: Birger Ernst Gustafsson
- Nationality: Swedish
- Born: 15 January 1874 Stockholm, Sweden
- Died: 22 February 1969 (aged 95) Nämdö, Sweden

Sport

Sailing career
- Class: 6 Metre
- Club: SSS, Stockholm

Birger Ernst Gustafsson (1874-1969) was a sailor from Sweden, who represented his native country at the 1908 Summer Olympics in Ryde, Great Britain. Gustafsson took the 5th place in the 6 Metre.
