= Louis Depière =

Belgian sailor

Personal information
- Nationality: Belgian
- Born: 1872
- Died: 1962 (aged 89–90) Ostend

Sport

Sailing career
- Class: 6 Metre

Louis Depière (7 December 1871 - 15 June 1962) was a merchant navy officer and a sailor from Belgium, who represented his native country at the 1920 Summer Olympics in Ostend, Belgium. Depière took the 4th place in the 6 Metre.

He was also the Worshipful Master (1928-1929) of the mixed Freemasonic lodge “Aurore” in Bruges, before re-opening the “Trois Niveaux” lodge in Ostend (1932).

== Sources ==
- "Louis Depière Bio, Stats, and Results". Olympic Sports. Sports-Reference.com. Archived from the original on 18 April 2020.
- Belgium Olympic Committee, ed. (1957). Olympic Games 1920 – Officiel Report (PDF). Archived from the original (PDF) on 27 September 2007.
- "The Freemasonic lodge "La Flandre"". Raphael Rodenbach (1861-1951), “Achtbare Meester” van de Brugse vrijmetselaarsloge La Flandre (in Dutch). Willy Dezutter.
