= Frank Smith (sailor) =

British sailor

Personal information
- Full name: Frank B. Smith
- Nationality: British

Sailing career
- Sport: Sailing
- Class: 6 Metre

Frank B. Smith was a sailor from the Great Britain, who represented his native country at the 1908 Summer Olympics in Ryde, Great Britain. Smith took the 4th place in the 6 Metre.
