= Sailing at the 1912 Summer Olympics – 6 Metre =

6-Metre at the Games of the V Olympiad
- Line drawing of the 6-Metre
- Venue: Nynäshamn
- Dates: First race: 20 July 1912; Last race: 22 July 1912
- Competitors: 18 from 5 nations
- Teams: 6

Medalists
1st place, gold medalist(s)		Gaston Thubé, Amédée Thubé, Jacques Thubé	France
2nd place, silver medalist(s)		Hans Meulengracht-Madsen, Steen Herschend, Sven Thomsen	Denmark
3rd place, bronze medalist(s)		Eric Sandberg, Otto Aust, Harald Sandberg	Sweden

The 6 Metre was a sailing event on the Sailing at the 1912 Summer Olympics program in Nynäshamn. Two races were scheduled plus eventual sail-offs. 18 sailors, on 6 boats, from 5 nations entered.

== Race schedule ==
●	Opening ceremony	●	Event competitions	●	Sail-off's	●	Closing ceremony

Date	July								
Date	19 Fri	20 Sat	21 Sun	22 Mon	23 Tue	24 Wed	25 Thu	26 Fri	27 Sat
6-Metre		●	●	●		International races			
Total gold medals				1					
Ceremonies	●								●

== Course area and course configuration ==
For the 6-Metre Course B was used.

1912 Olympic Course Area & courses
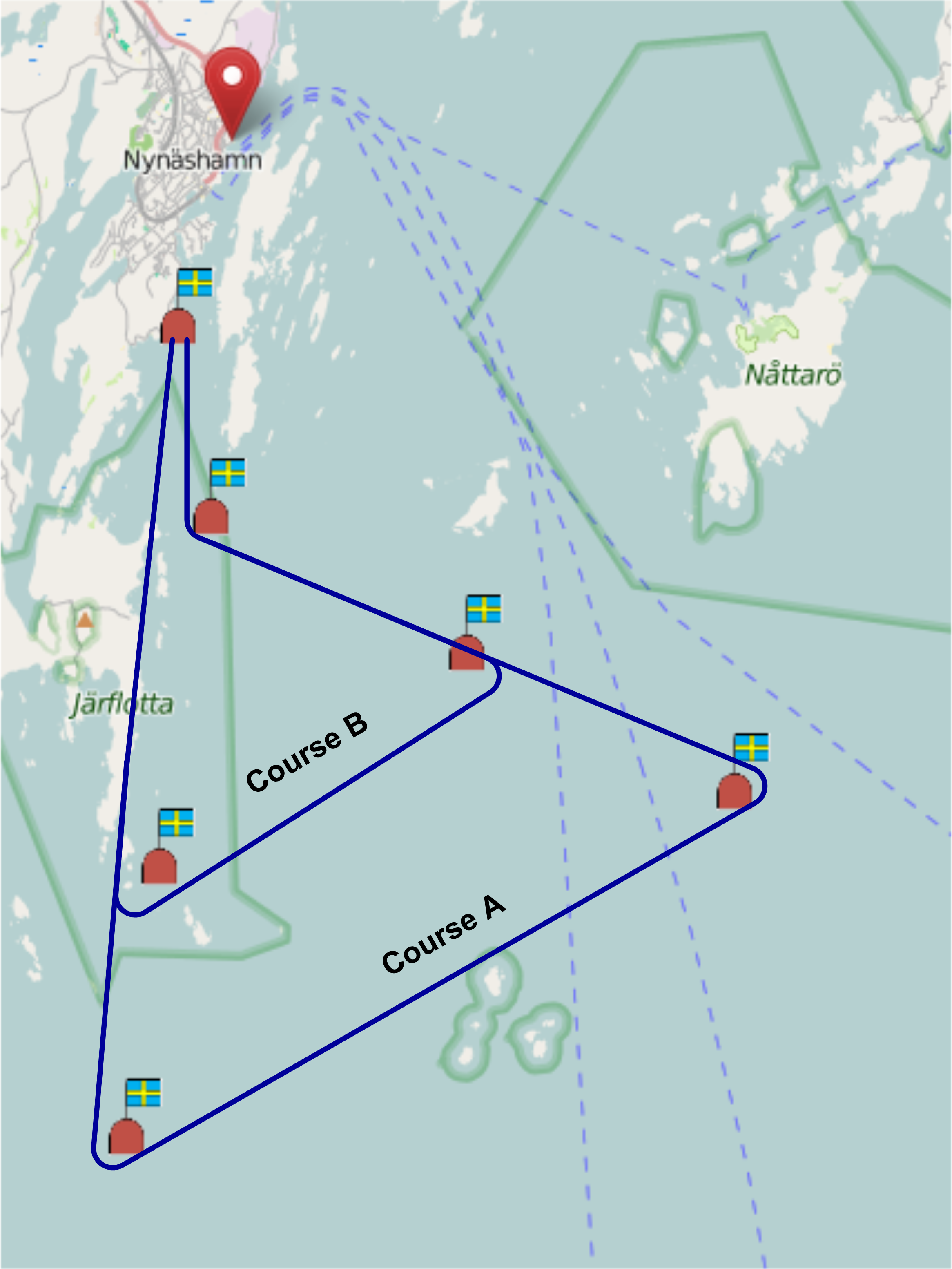

== Weather conditions ==
Date	Race	Description	Wind speed	Wind direction	Start
20 July 1912	1	Light easterly breeze	5 knots (9.3 km/h) - 9 knots (17 km/h)		11:45
21 July 1912	2	Light breeze in the morning	4 knots (7.4 km/h) - 6 knots (11 km/h)		11:45
22 July 1912	3	Very light winds	5 knots (9.3 km/h) - 7 knots (13 km/h)		11:45

== Final results ==
The 1912 Olympic scoring system was used. All competitors were male.

Rank	Country	Helmsman	Crew	Boat	Race 1		Race 2		Race 3	
Rank	Country	Helmsman	Crew	Boat	Pos.	Pts.	Pos.	Pts.	Pos.	Pts.
1	France	Gaston Thubé	Amédée Thubé; Jacques Thubé	Mac Miche	2:35:20	3	2:23:44	7	2:38:48	7
2	Denmark	Hans Meulengracht-Madsen	Steen Herschend; Sven Thomsen	Nurdug II	2:34:41	7	2:26:07	3	2:41:40	3
3	Sweden	Eric Sandberg	Otto Aust; Harald Sandberg	Kerstin	2:44:54	0	2:26:44	1	2:42:32	7
4	Sweden	Olof Mark	Edvin Hagberg; Jonas Jonsson	Sass	2:37:01	1	2:30:24	0	2:44:11	3
5	Finland	Ernst Estlander	Torsten Sandelin; Gunnar Stenbäck	Finn II	2:39:33	0	2:31:02	0		
5	Norway	Edvard Christensen	Hans Christiansen; Eigil Christiansen	Sonja II	2:39:48	0	2:30:39	0		

- There were two sail-off's. One between Mac Miche and Nurdug II and one between Kerstin and Sass.
- There was no sail-off between Finn II and Sonja II.

== Daily standings ==
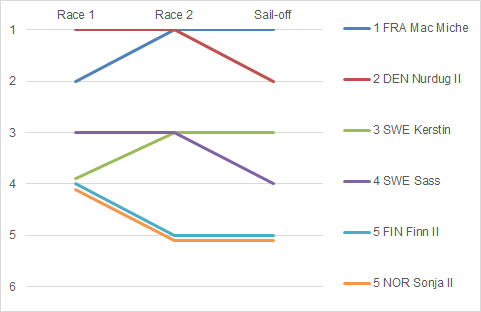
Graph showing the daily standings in the 6 Metre during the 1912 Summer Olympics

== Notes ==
In the 6 Metre there was a 'No show' of three boats:

Country	Boatsname
Denmark	Nurdug
Finland	Phoebé
Russian Empire	Schkitz

== Other information ==
=== Prizes ===
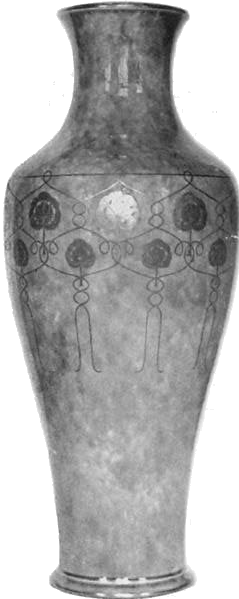
Challenge Cup

- The following Commemorative Plaque were handed out by the Royal Swedish Yacht Club to the owners of:
1. Mac Miche: Gaston Thubé & G. Fitau
2. Nurdug II: Otto Reedz-Thott
3. Kerstin: Dan Broström
- Challenge Cup (vase) of the French Government to the owners of: Mac Miche: Gaston Thubé & G. Fitau
