= Edgar Behr =

German Olympic sailor (1910-1985)

Personal information
- Full name: Edgar Richard Behr
- Nationality: German
- Born: 12 September 1910; Hamburg, Germany
- Died: 2 March 1985 (aged 74); Hamburg, Germany

Sailing career
- Class: Snowbird

Edgar Richard Behr (12 September 1910 – 2 March 1985) was a sailor from Germany, who represented his country in the Snowbird in Los Angeles, United States.
