= Silvio Treleani =

Italian sailor

Personal information
- Nationality: Italian
- Born: 29 September 1906 Šibenik
- Died: 25 January 1980 (aged 73)

Sailing career
- Sport: Sailing
- Class: Snowbird
Competition record
Sailing
Representing Italy
Olympic Games
1932 Los Angeles	Snowbird (8th)
- Updated on 8 May 2015

Silvio Treleani (29 September 1906 – 25 January 1980) was a sailor from Italy, who represented his country in the Snowbird in Los Angeles, United States.
