= Sailing at the 1908 Summer Olympics – 6 Metre =

6 Metre at the Games of the IV Olympiad
- Line drawing of a 6-Metre
- Venue: Royal Victoria Yacht Club, Ryde
- Dates: First race: July 27, 1908; Last race: July 29, 1908
- Competitors: 15 from 4 nations
- Teams: 5

Medalists
| 1st place, gold medalist(s) | | Gilbert Laws, Thomas McMeekin, Charles Crichton | Great Britain |
| 2nd place, silver medalist(s) | | Léon Huybrechts, Louis Huybrechts, Henri Weewauters | Belgium |
| 3rd place, bronze medalist(s) | | Henri Arthus, Louis Potheau, Pierre Rabot | France |

The 6 Metre was a sailing event on the Sailing at the 1908 Summer Olympics program in Ryde. Three races were scheduled. Each nation could enter up to 2 boats. 15 sailors, on 5 boats, from 4 nation competed.

== Race schedule ==
| ● | Event competitions | ● | Event finals |

| Date | July | | | | | August | | | | | | | | | | | |
| Date | 27 Mon | 28 Tue | 29 Wed | 30 Thu | 31 Fri | 1 Sat | 2 Sun | 3 Mon | 4 Tue | 5 Wed | 6 Thu | 7 Fri | 8 Sat | 9 Sun | 10 Mon | 11 Tue | 12 Wed |
|---|---|---|---|---|---|---|---|---|---|---|---|---|---|---|---|---|---|
| 6-Metre | ● | ● | ● | | | | | | | | | | | | | | |
| Total gold medals | | | 1 | | | | | | | | | | | | | | |

== Course area ==
The following course was used during the 1908 Olympic 6-Metre regattas in all three races:

- Start at Ryde Pier
- No.2. Mother Bank Buoy
- East Measured Mile Buoy
- East Sturbridge Buoy
- Finish at Ryde Pier

Two rounds for a total of 13 nautical miles (24 km).

1908 Olympic Course Area, Ryde
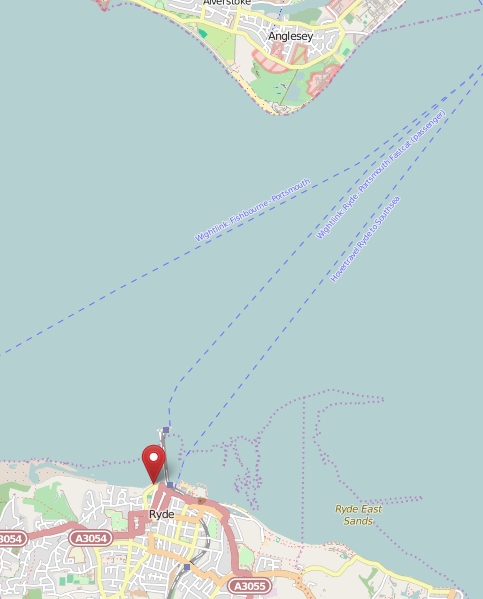

== Weather conditions ==
| Date | Race | Description | Sea | Wind direction | Start |
|---|---|---|---|---|---|
| 27-JUL-1908 | 1 | Light wind. More wind in the second round | Calm | to | 12:30 |
| 28-JUL-1908 | 2 | Extreme light wind. | death calm | | 12:30 |
| 29-JUL-1908 | 3 | Very light breeze, fluking. Late in the afternoon true wind, moderate | Calm | | 12:30 |

== Final results ==
The 1908 Olympic scoring system was used. All competitors were male.

| Rank | Country | Helmsman | Crew | Boat | Race 1 | | Race 2 | | Race 3 | | Total |
| Rank | Country | Helmsman | Crew | Boat | Pos. | Pts. | Pos. | Pts. | Pos. | Pts. | Total |
| 1 | Great Britain | Gilbert Laws | Thomas McMeekin; Charles Crichton | Dormy | 1 | 3 | 1 | 3 | 3 | 1 | 2 first places |
| 2 | Belgium | Léon Huybrechts | Louis Huybrechts; Henri Weewauters | Zut | 3 | 1 | 4 | 0 | 1 | 3 | 1 first place |
| 3 | France | Henri Arthus | Louis Potheau; Pierre Rabot | Guyoni | 4 | 0 | 2 | 2 | 2 | 2 | 2 second places |
| 4 | Great Britain | John Leuchars | Wilfrid Leuchars; Frank Smith | Sibindi | 2 | 2 | 3 | 1 | 4 | 0 | 1 second place |
| 5 | Sweden | Karl-Einar Sjögren | Birger Gustafsson; Jonas Jonsson | Freja | 5 | 0 | 5 | 0 | 5 | 0 | 3 fifth places |

== Daily standings ==
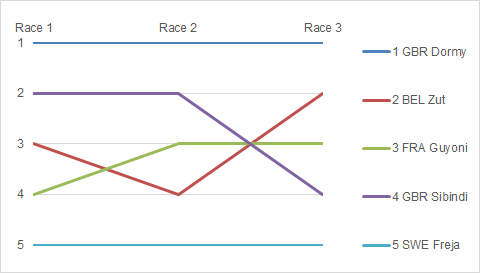
Graph showing the daily standings in the 6 Metre during the 1908 Summer Olympics

== Other information ==
=== Extra awards ===
Gilt commemorative medal:

- Thomas McMeekin owner of Dormy

Silver commemorative medal:

- R. Osterrieth Owner of Zut
- Johan Leuchars owner of Sibindi
- R. Delagrave owner of Guyoni

Challenge vase of sèvres china given by the President of the France Republic:

- Thomas McMeekin owner of Dormy
