= Charles Lyon (sailor) =

Personal information
- Full name: Charles William Lyon, Jr.
- Nationality: American
- Born: July 13, 1915 Los Angeles
- Died: January 7, 1987 (aged 71) Lake Worth

Sport

Sailing career
- Class: Snowbird

Charles William Lyon Jr. (1915–1987) was a sailor from the United States, who represented his country in the Snowbird in Los Angeles, United States During race one to three and six to eleven.

== Sources ==
- "Charles Lyon Bio, Stats, and Results". Olympic Sports. Sports-Reference.com. Archived from the original on April 18, 2020.
