= Willy Valcke =

Belgian sailor

Personal information
- Nationality: Belgian
- Born: 23 May 1887
- Died: 11 January 1957 (aged 69)

Sailing career
- Sport: Sailing
- Class: 6 Metre
Competition record
Sailing
Representing Belgium
Olympic Games
4th	1920 Ostend	6 Metre
- Updated on 23 February 2015

Willy Valcke (23 May 1887 - 11 January 1957) was a Belgian sailor, who represented his country at the 1920 Summer Olympics in Ostend. Valcke finished in fourth place.

== Sources ==
- Evans, Hilary; Gjerde, Arild; Heijmans, Jeroen; Mallon, Bill; et al. "Willy Valcke Bio, Stats, and Results". Olympics at Sports-Reference.com. Sports Reference LLC. Archived from the original on 18 April 2020.
- Belgium Olympic Committee, ed. (1957). Olympic Games 1920 – Officiel Report (PDF). Archived from the original (PDF) on 27 September 2007.
