= Joseph Jessop =

Personal information
- Full name: Joseph Edwardus Jessop
- Nationality: American
- Born: July 24, 1898 Los Angeles
- Died: March 24, 1996 (aged 97) San Diego

Sport

Sailing career
- Class: Snowbird
Competition record
Sailing
Representing United States
Olympic Games
1932 Los Angeles	Snowbird (7th)
- Updated on 8 May 2015

Joseph Edwardus Jessop was a sailor from the United States, who represented his country in the Snowbird in Los Angeles, United States During race four and five.

== Sources ==
- "Joseph Jessop Bio, Stats, and Results". Olympic Sports. Sports-Reference.com. Archived from the original on April 18, 2020.
- Breitbard Hall of Fame
- Joseph Jessop at Olympedia
