= Santiago Amat =

Spanish sailor (1887–1982)

Personal information
- Full name: Santiago Amat Cansino
- Nationality: Spanish
- Born: 22 June 1887 Barcelona, Catalonia, Spain
- Died: 5 November 1982 (aged 95) Barcelona, Catalonia, Spain

Sailing career
- Sport: Sailing
- Club: Real Club Marítimo de Barcelona
- Class(es): Snipe; French National Monotype 1924; 6 Metre; 12' Dinghy; Snowbird
Competition record
Representing Spain
Sailing
Olympic Games
	1924 Meulan	French National Monotype 1924 (4th)
	1924 Le Havre	6 Metre
	1928 Amsterdam	12' Dinghy (14th)
Bronze medal – third place	1932 Los Angeles	Snowbird

Santiago Amat Cansino (22 June 1887 – 5 November 1982) was a Spanish sailor who competed in the 1924 Summer Olympics, in the 1928 Summer Olympics, and in the 1932 Summer Olympics. In 1932 he won the bronze medal in the Snowbird class. He was Spanish national champion in the Snipe class three times (1944, 1946 and 1951).
