= Gilbert Laws =

Gilbert Laws may refer to:

- Gilbert L. Laws (1838–1907), U.S. Representative from Nebraska
- Gilbert Laws (sailor) (1870–1918), British Olympic sailor
