= Thomas Webster (sailor) =

American sailor

Medal record

Sailing

Representing the United States

Olympic Games
Gold medal – first place	1932 Los Angeles	8 metre class

Thomas Campbell Webster (December 25, 1910 – January 31, 1981) was an American sailor who competed in the 1932 Summer Olympics.

In 1932 he was a crew member of the American boat Angelita which won the gold medal in the 8 metre class.
