= Wilfrid Leuchars =

British sailor

Personal information
- Nationality: British
- Born: 26 May 1880
- Died: 27 October 1942 (aged 62)

Sport

Sailing career
- Class: 6 Metre

Wilfrid Leuchars (26 May 1880 – 27 October 1942) was a sailor from Great Britain, who represented his native country at the 1908 Summer Olympics in Ryde, Great Britain. Leuchars took the 4th place in the 6 Metre class.
