= John Leuchars =

British sailor

Personal information
- Full name: John Walter Leuchars
- Nationality: British
- Born: 25 July 1852 Durban, Colony of Natal
- Died: 20 September 1920 (aged 68) Durban, South Africa

Sport

Sailing career
- Class: 6 Metre

John Walter Leuchars (25 July 1852 – 20 September 1920) was a sailor from Great Britain, who represented his native country at the 1908 Summer Olympics in Ryde, Great Britain. Leuchars took the 4th place in the 6 Metre class.
