= Jonas Jonsson (sailor) =

Swedish sailor

Personal information
- Full name: Ernst Jonas Jonsson
- Nationality: Swedish
- Born: September 30, 1873 Stockholm, Sweden
- Died: March 14, 1926 (aged 52) Djursholm, Sweden

Sport

Sailing career
- Class: 6 Metre
- Club: Stockholms Segelsällskap
Competition record
Sailing
Representing Sweden
Olympic Games
1908 London	6 Metre (5th)
- Updated on 8 May 2015

Ernst Jonas Jonsson (September 30, 1873 – March 14, 1926) was a sailor from Sweden, who represented his native country at the 1908 Summer Olympics in Ryde, Great Britain. Jonsson took the 5th place in the 6 Metre.
