= Alphonse Burnand =

American sailor

Personal information
- Full name: Alphonse A. Burnand Jr.
- Born: January 21, 1896 Leadville, Colorado, U.S.
- Died: December 4, 1981 (aged 85) Orange, California, U.S.

Sailing career
- Sport: Sailing
Medal record
Men's sailing
Representing the United States
Olympic Games
Gold medal – first place	1932 Los Angeles	8 metre class

Alphonse A. Burnand Jr. (January 21, 1896 – December 4, 1981) was an American sailor who competed in the 1932 Summer Olympics.

He was born in Leadville, Colorado and died in Orange, California.

In 1932, he was a crew member of the American boat Angelita which won the gold medal in the 8-metre class.

Burnand is considered the "Father of Borrego Springs". He was born in 1896 in Colorado, the son of a miner. The family moved to Santa Monica where Burnand grew up and attended the University of California, Davis, majoring in agriculture. Following graduation, he went to Delano in California's Central Valley, the largest table grape-producing area in the state. After working in the fields, he soon acquired his own vineyard, and met the DiGiorgio family, at the time the largest grape growers in the world.

Alphonse Burnand attended Stanford, as did his Olympic skipper, Owen Churchill. Burnand graduated in 1914 and later started his own business as an investment broker. Burnand and Churchill sailed together frequently, were close friends, and also went into business together as fruit and vegetable brokers in the San Joaquin Valley.

Around 1933, Burnand made his first trip to the Borrego Valley looking for areas where crops would ripen early. The first crops to market would command a higher price and potentially greater profit. In the Borrego Valley grapes would be ready to pick several weeks ahead of other growing areas. The grapes would usually be sent to markets in New York. In 1936 Burnand purchased an interest in the Coyote Canyon Ranch, to be followed by the de Anza Ranch. The heat, high winds and winter cold made growing grapes in Borrego difficult – but despite some failures, Burnand had spent enough time in the Valley to see its potential as a resort. He began buying up railroad in-holdings in the Park area, and trading them with the State for valley land as well as picking up property from tax sales and homesteaders wanting out. His holdings grew to about 17,000 acres.

In 1945, Burnand announced plans for a resort community. The San Diego Union reported that he "was ambitious to create a San Diego County rival of Palm Springs". Development would not start until the end of the war. Burnand gathered several Los Angeles investors and incorporated the Borrego Valley Land and Development Company (to own the land and handle development) and the Borrego Springs Company (to handle sales and marketing). Burnand also formed the Borrego Valley Water Company to supply the development with this most precious resource in the desert.

The community of Borrego Springs was destined to be a special place. Burnand sought to protect the beauty of the desert through restrictions on development – somewhat of an unusual concept in planning in the 1940s. Lot sizes were designed to protect privacy. Developers were not allowed to whole-sale clear land of its fragile, native plants. Restrictions of what could and could not be built, and an architectural review board were put in place.

In 1953, the original Borrego Springs Land and Development Company was dissolved with Burnand and two other Los Angeles investors each retaining a share of the unsold land. At the end of 1954, the Los Angeles investors are bought out by Texas Oilman and La Jolla Farms owner William Black; San Diego Union Tribune publisher James Copley and the DiGiorgio Fruit Corporation, represented by vice president Robert DiGiorgio.

The January 1955 Borrego Sun, in a front-page article, reported:

In a statement yesterday, the new association announced a four point program for the development of Borrego:

To ensure through proper zoning and planning the orderly development of Borrego Valley as one of San Diego County's tourist and vacation areas.

2. To insure the continued development of agriculture in Borrego Valley through proper planning and the conservation and further development of water resources.

3. To establish a long range program to attract home owners and additional resort facilities to Borrego

4. To insure the long range future of Borrego through development of the area on sound business principles and to insure that such development will enhance the natural beauty of San Diego's desert playground.

Burnand lived to see the seed he planted bloom. He died in 1981 at the age of 85.
