= Richard Moore (sailor) =

American sailor

Personal information
- Full name: Richard Fulton Moore
- Nationality: American
- Born: August 11, 1910 San Bernardino, California, U.S.
- Died: November 16, 2005 (aged 95) Newport Beach, California, U.S.
- Height: 167 cm (5 ft 6 in)

Sport

Sailing career
- Class: 8 Metre
- Club: California Yacht Club
Medal record
Sailing
Representing United States
Olympic Games
Gold medal – first place	1932 Los Angeles	8 Metre

Richard Fulton Moore (August 11, 1910 – November 16, 2005) was a sailor from the United States of America, who represented his country at the 1932 Summer Olympics in Los Angeles.
