= Kenneth Carey =

American sailor (1893–1981)

Medal record

Men's sailing

Representing the United States

Olympic Games
Gold medal – first place	1932 Los Angeles	8 metre class

Kenneth Anton Carey (August 7, 1893 – January 4, 1981) was an American sailor who competed in the 1932 Summer Olympics.

In 1932 he was a crew member of the American boat Angelita which won the gold medal in the 8 metre class.
