= Ken Glass =

Canadian yacht racer (1913–1961)

Personal information
- Full name: Kenneth Gilbert Glass
- Nationality: Canadian
- Born: July 24, 1913 Toronto
- Died: January 17, 1961 (aged 47) Vancouver

Sailing career
- Sport: Sailing
- Club: Royal Vancouver Yacht Club, Vancouver (CAN)
- Class: 6 Metre
Medal record
Sailing
Representing Canada
Olympic Games
Bronze medal – third place	1932 Los Angeles	6 Metre
- Updated on 22 March 2015

Kenneth Gilbert Glass (1913-1961) was a sailor from Canada, who represented his country at the 1932 Summer Olympics in Los Angeles, United States.

== Sources ==
- "Ken Glass Bio, Stats, and Results". Olympic Sports. Sports-Reference.com. Archived from the original on 18 April 2020.
