= Hans Christiansen (sailor) =

Norwegian yacht racer (1867-1938)

Personal information
- Nationality: Norwegian
- Born: 16 October 1867; Nesna Municipality, Norway
- Died: 20 July 1938 (aged 70)

Sport
- Sport: Sailing

Hans Christiansen (16 October 1867 – 20 July 1938) was a Norwegian sailor. He was born in Nesna Municipality, and was the father of Eigil Christiansen. He competed in the 6 metre class at the 1912 Summer Olympics in Stockholm, placing tied fifth with the boat Sonja II, together with Edvart Christensen and his son Eigil.
