= John Klotz =

Belgian sailor

Medal record

Sailing

Representing Belgium

Olympic Games
Silver medal – second place	1920 Antwerp	6 metre (1919 rating)

John Klotz was a Belgian sailor who won the Silver medal in 6 metre class (1919 rating) in the 1920 Summer Olympics in Antwerp along with Léon Huybrechts and Charles van den Bussche.
