= Olof Mark =

Swedish sailor

Knut Olof Mark (January 13, 1873 – May 15, 1920) was a Swedish sailor who competed in the 1912 Summer Olympics. In 1912, he was part of the Swedish boat Sass, which finished fourth in the 6 metre class competition.
