= Sailing at the 1932 Summer Olympics – Snowbird =

Snowbird at the Games of the X Olympiad
- Line drawing of the Snowbird
- Venue: Los Angeles Harbor
- Dates: First race: August 5, 1932; Last race: August 11, 1932
- Competitors: 12 from 11 nations
- Teams: 11

Medalists
1st place, gold medalist(s)		Jacques Lebrun	France
2nd place, silver medalist(s)		Bob Maas	Netherlands
3rd place, bronze medalist(s)		Santiago Amat	Spain

The Snowbird was a sailing event on the Sailing at the 1932 Summer Olympics program in Los Angeles Harbor. Eleven races were scheduled. 12 sailors, on 11 boats, from 11 nation competed.

== Race schedule ==
●	Event competitions	●	Event finals

Date	August						
Date	5th Fri	6th Sat	7th Sun	8th Mon	9th Tue	10th Wed	11th Thu
Snowbird	●	●	●●	●	●	●●	●●●
Total gold medals							1

== Course area and course configuration ==
The courses had been well prepared. The marks were laid by the United States Lighthouse Service in the form of large Government. Visiting yachts were kept at a safe distance from the racing boats by the US Coast Guard. Tows were arranged by the US Navy to and from Los Angeles Harbor to the race area. The Snowbird stayed inside the breakwater to protect them from the ocean swell. Unfortunately no documentation is found about the course configuration(s) yet.

1932 Olympic Course Areas

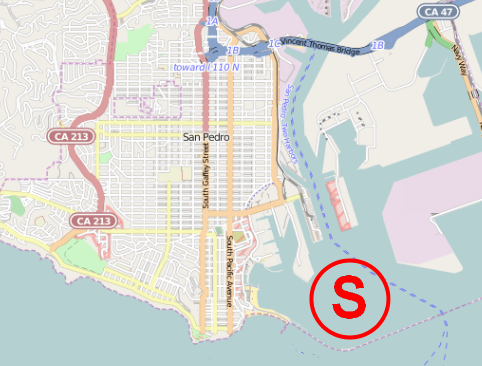
OpenStreetMap view of the current map of Los Angeles. Projected are the 1932 Olympic courses of the Snowbird (Red Area).

== Weather conditions ==
Due to the normal afternoon sea breeze in Los Angeles Harbor it was decided to race the Snowbirds in the morning. However it turned out that in various morning there was no wind at all. This made it necessary to run the Snowbirds races in the afternoon in windy conditions. It also made id difficult for several sailors to sail the races in the Snowbird as well in one of the other classes.

== Final results ==
Rank	Country	Helmsman	Race 1		Race 2		Race 3		Race 4		Race 5		Race 6		Race 7		Race 8		Race 9		Race 10		Race 11		Total
Rank	Country	Helmsman	Pos.	Pts.	Pos.	Pts.	Pos.	Pts.	Pos.	Pts.	Pos.	Pts.	Pos.	Pts.	Pos.	Pts.	Pos.	Pts.	Pos.	Pts.	Pos.	Pts.	Pos.	Pts.	Total
1st place, gold medalist(s)	France	Jacques Lebrun	6	6	7	5	7	5	4	8	1	11	3	9	1	11	3	9	4	8	4	8	5	7	87
2nd place, silver medalist(s)	Netherlands	Bob Maas	2	10	1	11	2	10	3	9	3	9	6	6	4	8	8	4	2	10	7	5	9	3	85
3rd place, bronze medalist(s)	Spain	Santiago Amat Cansino	5	7	8	4	4	8	5	7	2	10	4	8	2	10	1	11	8	4	10	2	7	5	76
4	Germany	Edgar Behr	10	2	2	10	3	9	2	10	6	6	5	7	6	6	4	8	DSQ	0	2	10	6	6	74
5	Canada	Reg Dixon	7	5	10	2	9	3	1	11	5	7	1	11	7	5	9	3	1	11	6	6	4	8	72
6	Great Britain	George Colin Ratsey	1	11	5	7	1	11	7	5	4	8	9	3	8	4	7	5	9	3	9	3	3	9	69
7	United States	Charles Lyon and, Joseph Jessop	3	9	3	9	8	4	DNF	0	8	4	7	5	3	9	6	6	7	5	1	11	8	4	66
8	Italy	Silvio Treleani	4	8	9	3	11	1	10	2	10	2	8	4	5	7	2	10	5	7	5	7	1	11	62
9	Sweden	Sven Thorell	8	4	6	6	6	6	6	6	7	5	DNS	0	DNF	0	5	7	6	6	3	9	2	10	59
10	Austria	Hans Riedl	9	3	4	8	10	2	9	3	9	3	7	5	9	3	10	2	3	9	8	4	10	2	44
11	South Africa	Cecil Goodricke	11	1	DNF	0	5	7	8	4	DNS	0	DNS	0	DNS	0	DNS	0	DNS	0	DNS	0	DNS	0	12

Legend: DNF – Did not finish; DNS – Did not start; DSQ – Disqualified;

== Daily standings ==
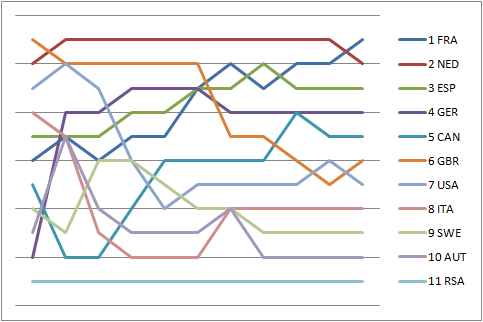
Graph showing the daily standings in the Snowbird during the 1932 Summer Olympics

== Notes ==
- For this event one yacht from each country, crewed by 1 amateur maximum (maximum number of substitutes 1) was allowed.
- This event was a gender independent event. However it turned out that only men participated.

== Other information ==
During the Sailing regattas at the 1932 Summer Olympics among others the following persons were competing in the Snowbird:

Snowbird sailors at the 1932 Olympic Games
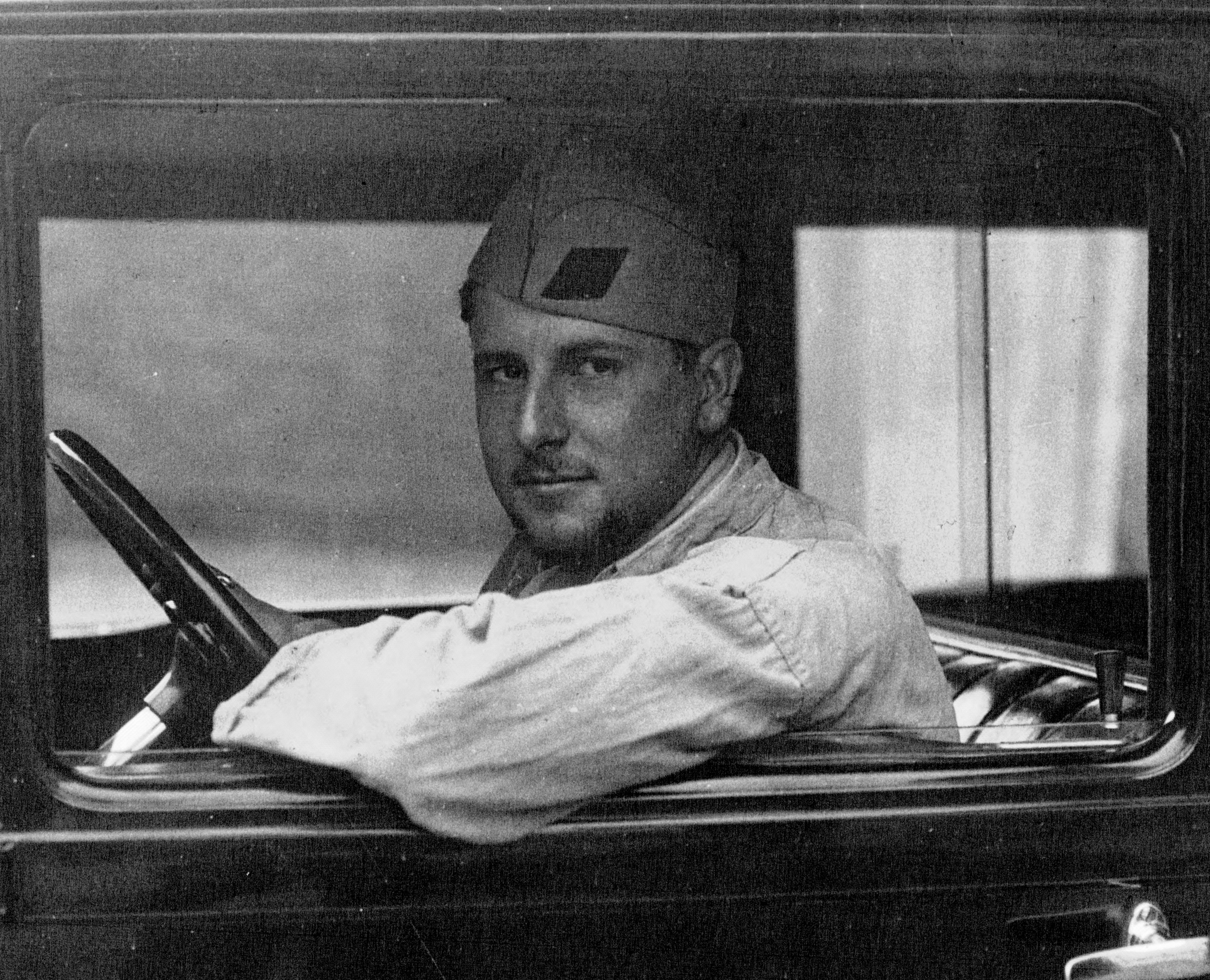
Jacques Lebrun (FRA)

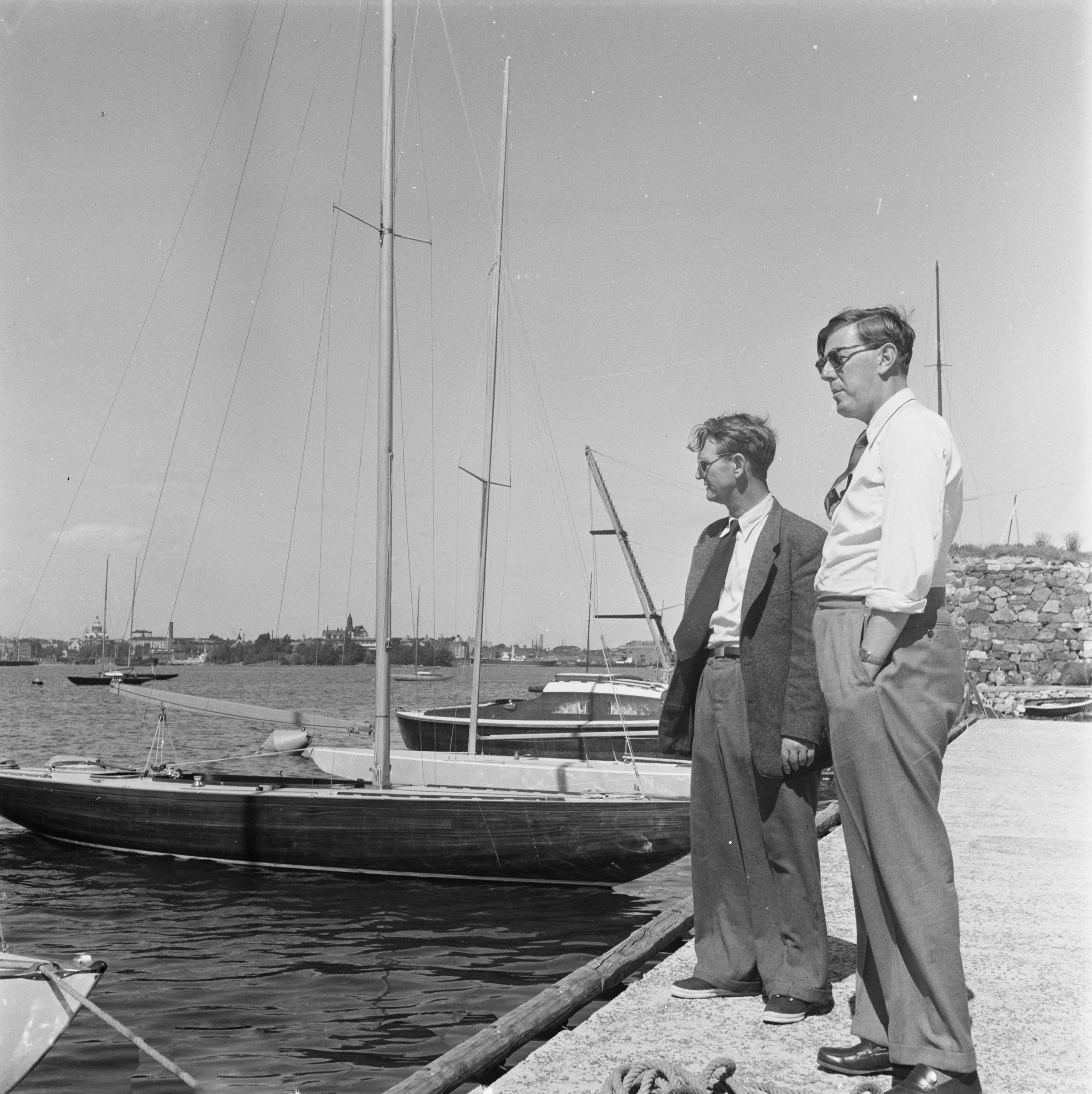
Bob Maas (left) (NED)

After the finish of the last race, Maas seemed to have won the gold medal. His French opponent Jacques Baptiste Lebrun, however, successfully had a protest re-opened about an earlier penalty after the competition had ended, which moved him into first place, and put Maas back to second place.
