= Edvart Christensen =

Norwegian sailor

Personal information
- Nationality: Norwegian
- Born: 21 February 1867; Ramnes, Norway
- Died: 13 August 1921 (aged 54)

Sport
- Sport: Sailing

Edvart Christensen (21 February 1867 – 13 August 1921) was a Norwegian sailor. He was born in Ramnes. He competed in the 6 metre class at the 1912 Summer Olympics in Stockholm, placing tied fifth with the boat Sonja II, together with Hans Christiansen and his son Eigil Christiansen.
