= Pierre Rabot =

French sailor

Medal record

Sailing

Representing France

Olympic Games
Bronze medal – third place	1908 London	6 Metre

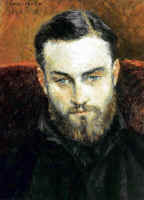
Gustave Caillebotte (1892), Portrait by Pierre Rabot

Pierre Rabot (born 1865, date of death unknown) was a French sailor. He won the bronze medal in the 6m class in the 1908 Summer Olympics in London along with Louis Potheau and Henri Arthus.
