= Henri Arthus =

French sailor and Olympian

Medal record

Sailing

Representing France

Olympic Games
Bronze medal – third place	1908 London	6 Metre

Alexandre Charles Georges Henri Arthus (March 10, 1872 – August 12, 1962) was a French sailor. He won the bronze medal in the 6m class in the 1908 Summer Olympics in London along with Louis Potheau and Pierre Rabot.

== Biography ==
Henri Arthus competed in the 6-meter class race at the 1908 Summer Olympics, held in London. Aboard the Guyoni, he won the bronze medal alongside Louis Potheau and Pierre Rabot.
