= Eigil Christiansen =

Norwegian sailor

Personal information
- Nationality: Norwegian
- Born: 16 May 1894 Brevik, Norway
- Died: 12 June 1943 (aged 49)

Sport
- Sport: Sailing

Eigil Kragh Christiansen (16 May 1894 – 12 June 1943) was a Norwegian sailor. He was born in Brevik, and was the son of Hans Christiansen. He competed in the 6 metre class at the 1912 Summer Olympics in Stockholm, placing tied fifth, together with his father and Edvart Christensen on the boat Sonja II.
