= Robert Sutton (sailor) =

American sailor

Medal record

Men's sailing

Representing the United States

Olympic Games
Gold medal – first place	1932 Los Angeles	8 metre class

Robert Mandel "Bob" Sutton (April 27, 1911 – September 13, 1977) was an American sailor who competed in the 1932 Summer Olympics.

In 1932 he was a crew member of the American boat Angelita which won the gold medal in the 8 metre class.
