= Robert H. Carlson =

American politician

Member of the New Hampshire House of Representatives from the Sullivan 8th district
- In office 1982–1984

Personal details
- Died: September 17, 1993
- Party: Democratic
- Spouse: Lillie

Robert H. Carlson (died September 17, 1993) was an American politician. He served as a Democratic member for the Sullivan 8th district of the New Hampshire House of Representatives.
