= Olle Åkerlund =

Swedish sailor (1911–1978)

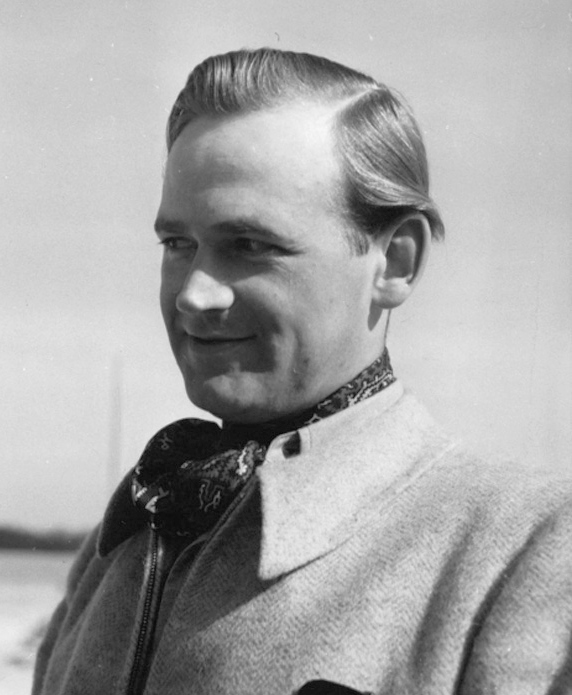

Personal information
- Full name: Olle Erik Cyrus Åkerlund
- Born: 28 September 1911 Annedal, Sweden
- Died: 4 February 1978 (aged 66) Stockholm, Sweden

Sailing career
- Sport: Sailing
- Club: Royal Swedish Yacht Club
Medal record
Men's Sailing
Representing Sweden
Olympic Games
Gold medal – first place	1932 Los Angeles	6 metre class

Olle Erik Cyrus Åkerlund (28 September 1911 – 4 February 1978) was a Swedish sailor. He was a crew member of the Swedish boat Bissbi that won the gold medal in the 6 m class at the 1932 Summer Olympics. The boat was owned by his father Erik, who was a publisher and entrepreneur.
