= Ronald Maitland =

Canadian sailor

Olympic medal record

Sailing
Silver medal – second place	1932 Los Angeles	8 metre class

Ronald Monteith Maitland (January 6, 1887 – April 15, 1937) was a Canadian sailor who competed in the 1932 Summer Olympics.

In 1932 he was a crew member of the Canadian boat Santa Maria which won the silver medal in the 8 metre class.
