= Frederic Conant =

American sailor

Olympic medal record

Sailing
Silver medal – second place	1932 Los Angeles	6 metre class

Frederic Warren Conant (February 9, 1892 – March 24, 1974) was an American sailor who competed in the 1932 Summer Olympics.

Conant, who went by "Ted", was born in Santa Barbara, California. He studied civil engineering at Cornell University, graduating in 1914. After graduation he joined the U.S. Army and later fought in the Battle of Fort Hidalgo. He married Dorothy Davis in 1918 and they had two sons, Peter and Dick. After leaving military service he worked at his brother-in-law's architectural firm and built his own house in Hollywood in 1925. The firm folded after the Wall Street crash of 1929. By 1934 he had joined the Douglas Aircraft Company where he worked until his retirement as Senior Vice President and Vice Chairman of the Board in 1968.

In 1932 he was a crew member of the American boat Gallant which won the silver medal in the 6 metre class. He was an avid sailor all his life.
