= Carl Dorsey =

American sailor

Olympic medal record

Men's sailing

Representing the United States
| Gold medal – first place | 1932 Los Angeles | 8 metre class |

Carl James Dorsey (May 12, 1894 – July 9, 1974), also known as Karl James Dorsey, was an American sailor who competed in the 1932 Summer Olympics.

In 1932 he was a crew member of the American boat Angelita which won the gold medal in the 8 metre class.
