= Amédée Thubé =

French sailor

Medal record

Sailing

Representing France

Olympic Games
Gold medal – first place	1912 Stockholm	6 metre class

Amédée Thubé (8 December 1884 – 29 January 1941) was a French sailor who competed in the 1912 Summer Olympics. He was part of the French boat Mac Miche, which won the gold medal in the 6 metre class.
