= John Biby =

American sailor

Medal record

Men's sailing

Representing the United States

Olympic Games
Gold medal – first place	1932 Los Angeles	8 metre class

John Edward Biby Jr. (February 23, 1912 – March 23, 2002), was an American sailor who competed in the 1932 Summer Olympics.

In 1932 he was a crew member of the Angelita which won the gold medal in the 8-metre class.

John Biby Jr was a member of Alamitos Bay Yacht Club in Long Beach.
