= Harald Sandberg (sailor) =

Swedish sailor

Olympic medal record

Men's Sailing
Bronze medal – third place	1912 Stockholm	6 metre class

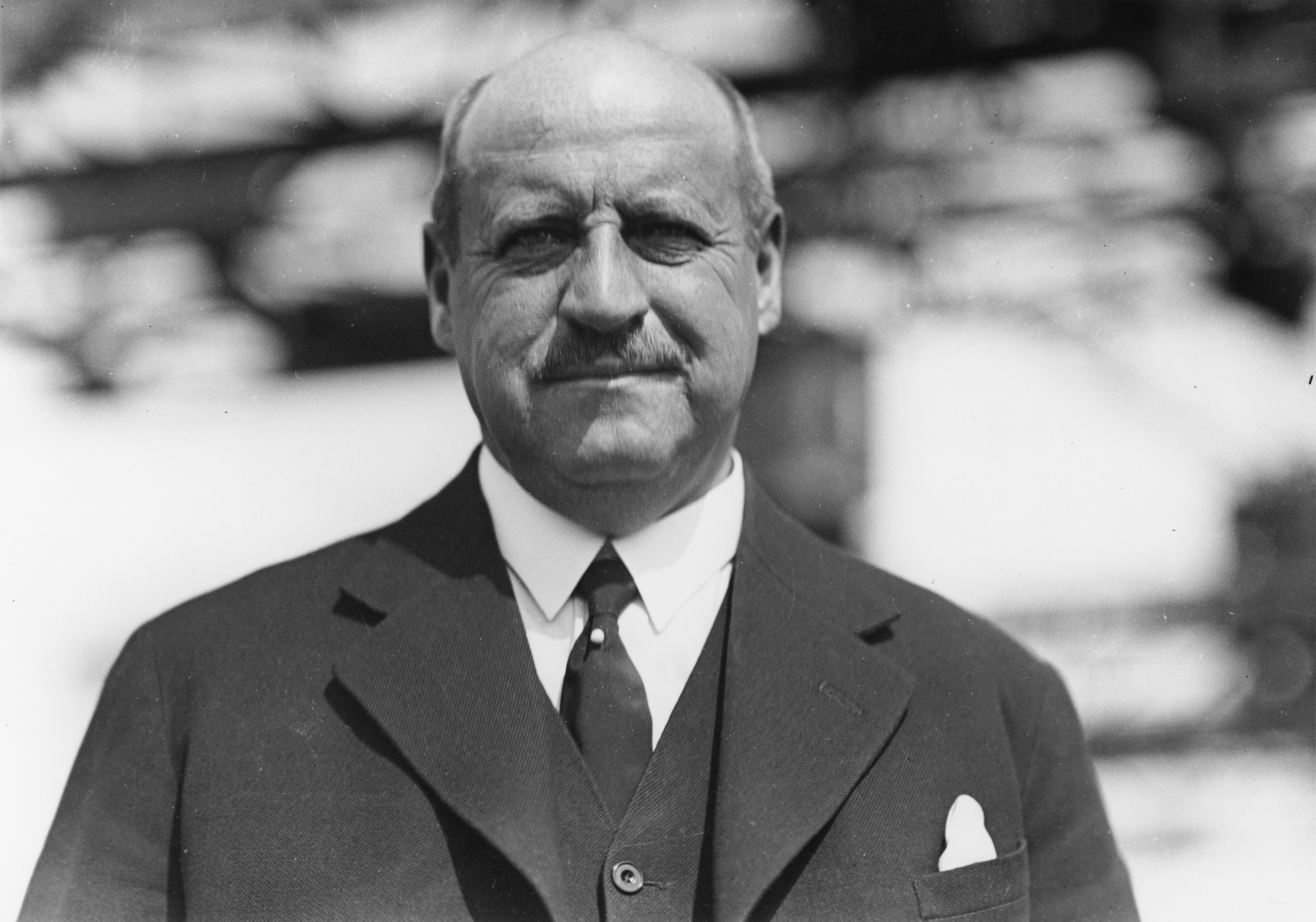
Portrait of Harald Sandberg

Harald Sandberg (October 22, 1883 – November 28, 1940) was a Swedish sailor who competed in the 1912 Summer Olympics. He was part of the Swedish boat Kerstin, which won the bronze medal in the 6 metre class.
