= Ernest Cribb =

Canadian sailor (1885–1957)

Olympic medal record

Sailing
Silver medal – second place	1932 Los Angeles	8 metre class

Ernest Frank Cribb (August 4, 1885 – August 18, 1957) was a Canadian sailor who competed in the 1932 Summer Olympics.

In 1932 he was a crew member of the Canadian boat Santa Maria which won the silver medal in the 8 metre class. He died in Vancouver.
