= Louis Potheau =

French sailor (1870–1955)

Medal record

Sailing

Representing France

Olympic Games
Bronze medal – third place	1908 London	6 Metre

Louis Adrien Potheau (August 14, 1870 – February 18, 1955) was a French sailor. He won the bronze medal in the 6m class in the 1908 Summer Olympics in London along with Henri Arthus and Pierre Rabot.
