= Gaston Thubé =

French sailor

Medal record

Sailing

Representing France

Olympic Games
Gold medal – first place	1912 Stockholm	6 metre class

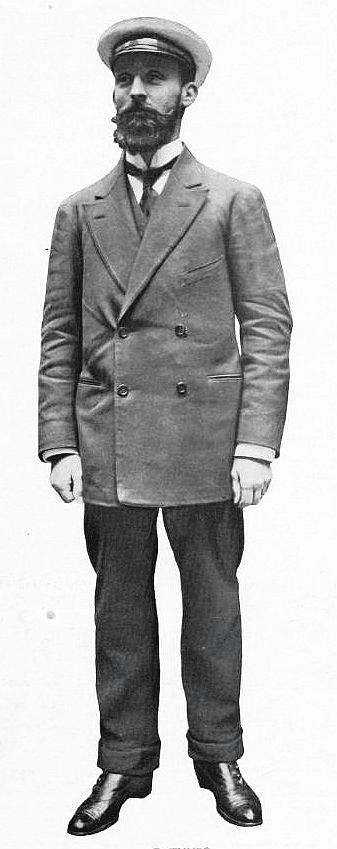
Gaston Thubé 1912

Gaston Thubé (16 October 1876 – 22 June 1974) was a French sailor who competed in the 1912 Summer Olympics. He was a crew member on the French boat Mac Miche, which won the gold medal in the 6 metre class.
