= Martin Hindorff =

Swedish sailor

Medal record

Men's Sailing

Representing Sweden

Olympic Games
Gold medal – first place	1932 Los Angeles	6 metre class
Bronze medal – third place	1936 Berlin	6 metre class
Bronze medal – third place	1948 London	6 metre class

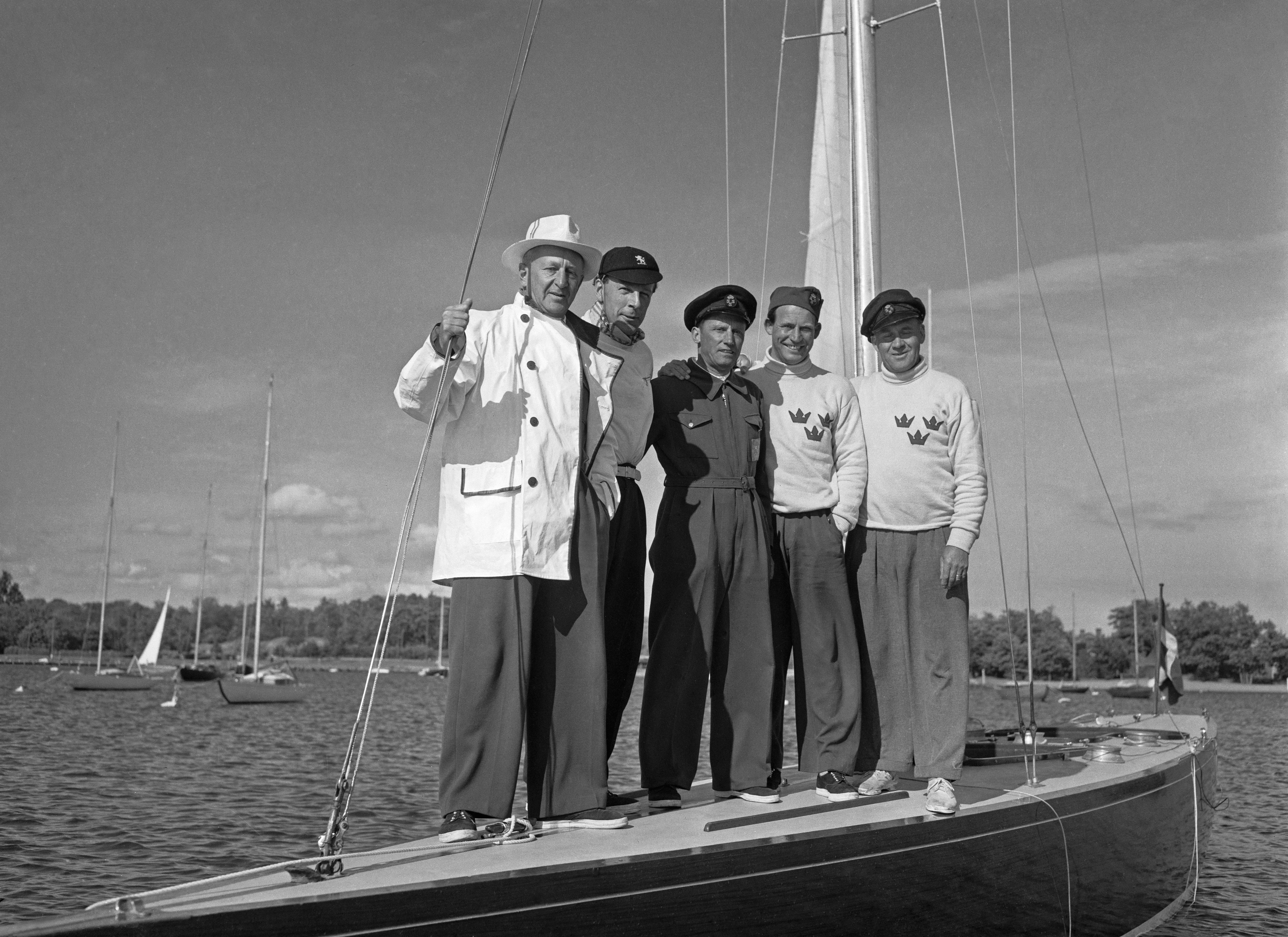

Martin Leonard Hindorff (30 March 1897 – 5 March 1969) was a Swedish sailor who competed in the 1932 Summer Olympics, in the 1936 Summer Olympics, in the 1948 Summer Olympics, and in the 1952 Summer Olympics. He was born in Nyköping and died in Stockholm.

In 1932 he was a crew member of the Swedish boat Bissbi, which won the gold medal in the 6 metre class.

Four years later he won the bronze medal as crew member of the Swedish boat May Be in the 6 metre class.

In 1948 he won his second bronze medal. This time as crew member of the Swedish boat Ali Baba II in the 6 metre class.

He finished his Olympic career in 1952 when he finished fourth as a crew member of the Swedish boat May Be II in the 6 metre class event.
