= Emmett Davis (sailor) =

American sailor (1886–1967)

Olympic medal record

Sailing
Silver medal – second place	1932 Los Angeles	6 metre class

Emmett S. Davis (February 28, 1886 – December 22, 1967) was an American sailor who competed in the 1932 Summer Olympics.

He was born in Maryland and died in Los Angeles, California.

In 1932 he was a crew member of the American boat Gallant which won the silver medal in the 6 metre class.
