= Harry Jones (sailor) =

Canadian sailor

Olympic medal record

Sailing
Silver medal – second place	1932 Los Angeles	8 metre class

Harold "Harry" Alfred Jones (May 8, 1895 – December 24, 1956) was a Canadian sailor who competed in the 1932 Summer Olympics.

Jones was born in Oakland, California, United States. In 1932 he was a crew member of the Canadian boat Santa Maria which won the silver medal in the 8 metre class. He died in Vancouver.
