= Temple Ashbrook =

American sailor (1896–1976)

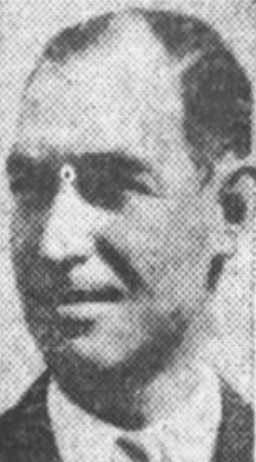
- Temple Ashbrook, from a 1929 newspaper
- Born: May 23, 1896
- Died: February 21, 1976 (aged 79)

Olympic medal record

Sailing
Silver medal – second place	1932 Los Angeles	6 metre class

Temple Withers Ashbrook (May 23, 1896 – February 21, 1976) was an American sailor who competed in the 1932 Summer Olympics.

== Personal life ==
Ashbrook was born in Kentucky, the son of Thomas Earl Ashbrook and Jennie Withers Ashbrook. He moved to Los Angeles before World War I, with his widowed mother and his younger brother, and was an insurance agent as a young man. In 1935, he married Margaret Ashton.

== Yachting ==
In 1929 Ashbrook sailed the Patricia in competition in Southern California. In 1930, he was secretary of the 45-Foot Sailing Association. At the 1932 Summer Olympics in Los Angeles, he was a crew member of the American boat Gallant, which won the silver medal in the 6 metre class. He sailed the Zephyr in a competition at Newport Beach in 1940.
