= Ingolf Rød =

Norwegian sailor (1889–1963)

Medal record

Sailing

Representing Norway

Olympic Games
Gold medal – first place	1920 Antwerp	6 metre (1919 rating)

Ingolf Rød (2 October 1889 – 19 December 1963) was a Norwegian sailor who competed in the 1920 Summer Olympics. He was a crew member of the Norwegian boat Jo, which won the gold medal in the 6 metre class (1919 rating).
