= Hubert Wallace =

Canadian olympic sailor (1899–1984)

Olympic medal record

Sailing
Silver medal – second place	1932 Los Angeles	8 metre class

Hubert Alfred Wallace (March 3, 1899 – July 3, 1984) was a Canadian sailor who competed in the 1932 Summer Olympics.

Born in Vancouver, he was a crew member of the Canadian boat Santa Maria which won the silver medal in the 8 metre class in 1932. He died in Oak Bay, British Columbia.
