= Charles Crichton (sailor) =

British sailor

Medal record

Sailing

Representing Great Britain

Olympic Games
Gold medal – first place	1908 London	6 Metre

Charles William Harry Crichton (7 July 1872 – 8 November 1958) was a British sailor who competed in the 1908 Summer Olympics. He was a crew member of the British boat Dormy, which won the gold medal in the 6 metre class.
