= George Gyles =

Canadian sailor

Olympic medal record

Sailing
Silver medal – second place	1932 Los Angeles	8 metre class

George Frederick Gyles (November 17, 1877 – February 5, 1959) was a Canadian sailor who competed in the 1932 Summer Olympics.

In 1932 he was a crew member of the Canadian boat Santa Maria which won the silver medal in the 8 metre class. He died in Vancouver.
