= Annan Knudsen =

Norwegian rower and sailor

Personal information
- Born: 23 November 1887 Drammen, Norway
- Died: 11 February 1982 (aged 94) Oslo, Norway
- Weight: 67 kg (148 lb)

Sport
- Sport: Rowing
- Club: Christiania Roklub, Oslo; KNS, Oslo
Medal record
Men's sailing
Representing Norway
Olympic Games
Silver medal – second place	1920 Antwerp	6 metre class (1907 rating)

Andreas "Annan" Knudsen (23 November 1887 – 11 February 1982) was a Norwegian sailor and rower.

Knudsen competed in the 1908 Summer Olympics with the men's eight in rowing, where they were eliminated in round one. At the 1920 Summer Olympics, he was a crew member of the Norwegian boat Marmi which won the silver medal in the 6 metre class (1907 rating).
