= Åke Bergqvist =

Swedish sailor (1900–1975)

Medal record

Men's Sailing

Representing Sweden

Olympic Games
| Gold medal – first place | 1932 Los Angeles | 6 metre class |

Åke Carl Magnus Bergqvist (29 August 1900 – 7 March 1975) was a Swedish sailor who competed in the 1932 Summer Olympics.

In 1932, he was a crew member of the Swedish boat, Bissbi, which won the gold medal in the 6 metre class.
