= Otto Aust =

Swedish sailor (1892–1943)

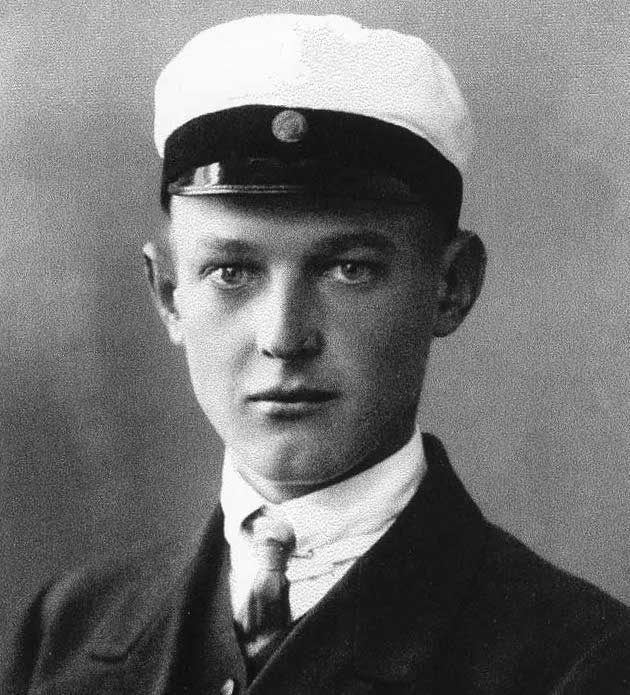

Personal information
- Born: 25 July 1892 Långedrag, Sweden
- Died: 12 October 1943 (aged 51) Bremen, Germany

Sailing career
- Sport: Sailing
- Club: Royal Gothenburg Yacht Club
Medal record
Representing Sweden
Olympic Games
Bronze medal – third place	1912 Stockholm	6 m class

Otto Torsten Johan Aust (25 July 1892 – 12 October 1943) was a Swedish sailor. He was a crew member of the boat Kerstin that won the bronze medal in the 6 m class at the 1912 Summer Olympics.
