= Jerry Wilson (sailor) =

Canadian yacht racer

Personal information
- Full name: Gerald "Jerry" Wilson
- Nationality: Canadian
- Born: 7 August 1906
- Died: 10 June 1945 (aged 38)

Sailing career
- Sport: Sailing
- Club: Royal Vancouver Yacht Club, Vancouver (CAN)
- Class: 6 Metre
Competition record
Sailing
Representing Canada
Olympic Games
Bronze medal – third place	1932 Los Angeles	6 Metre
- Updated on 22 March 2015

Gerald "Jerry" Wilson (7 August 1906 – 10 June 1945) was a sailor from Canada, who represented his country at the 1932 Summer Olympics in Los Angeles, US.
