= Charles Smith (sailor) =

American sailor

Olympic medal record

Sailing
Silver medal – second place	1932 Los Angeles	6 metre class

Charles E. Smith (October 21, 1889 – January 2, 1969) was an American sailor who competed in the 1932 Summer Olympics.

In 1932 he was a crew member of the American boat Gallant which won the silver medal in the 6 meter class.
