= William Cooper (sailor) =

American sailor (1910–1968)

Medal record

Men's sailing

Representing the United States

Olympic Games
Gold medal – first place	1932 Los Angeles	8 metre class

William Hunting Cooper (August 4, 1910 – March 19, 1968) was an American sailor who competed in the 1932 Summer Olympics. In 1932 he was a crew member of the American boat Angelita which won the gold medal in the 8 metre class.
