= Alan Morgan (sailor) =

American sailor

Personal information
- Full name: Alan Conger Morgan
- Born: March 30, 1909 Los Angeles, California, U.S.
- Died: June 22, 1984 (aged 75) Rancho Mirage, California, U.S.

Sailing career
- Sport: Sailing
- Club: California Yacht Club, Los Angeles
Medal record
Men's sailing
Representing the United States
Olympic Games
Gold medal – first place	1932 Los Angeles	8 metre class

Alan Conger Morgan (March 30, 1909 – June 22, 1984) was an American sailor who competed in the 1932 Summer Olympics.

He was born in California and died in Riverside County, California.

In 1932 he was a crew member of the American boat Angelita which won the gold medal in the 8 metre class.
