= Peter Gordon (sailor) =

Canadian sailor

Olympic medal record

Sailing
Silver medal – second place	1932 Los Angeles	8 metre class

Peter Dawson Gordon (August 16, 1882 – June 26, 1975) was a Canadian sailor who competed in the 1932 Summer Olympics. Born in Ontario he was a crew member of the Canadian boat Santa Maria which won the silver medal in the 8 metre class in 1932. He died in Vancouver.
