= Andreas Brecke =

Norwegian sailor (1879–1952)

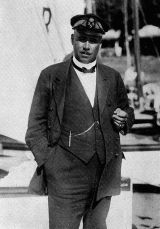

Medal record

Sailing

Representing Norway

Olympic Games
Gold medal – first place	1912 Stockholm	8 metre
Gold medal – first place	1920 Antwerp	6 metre (1919 rating)

Andreas Bang Brecke (14 September 1879 – 13 June 1952) was a Norwegian sailor who competed in the 1912 Summer Olympics and in the 1920 Summer Olympics.

In 1912 he was a crew member of the Norwegian boat Taifun, which won the gold medal in the 8 metre class. Eight years later he was part of the Norwegian boat Jo, which won the gold medal in the 6 metre class (1919 rating).
