= Jacques Lebrun =

French sailor

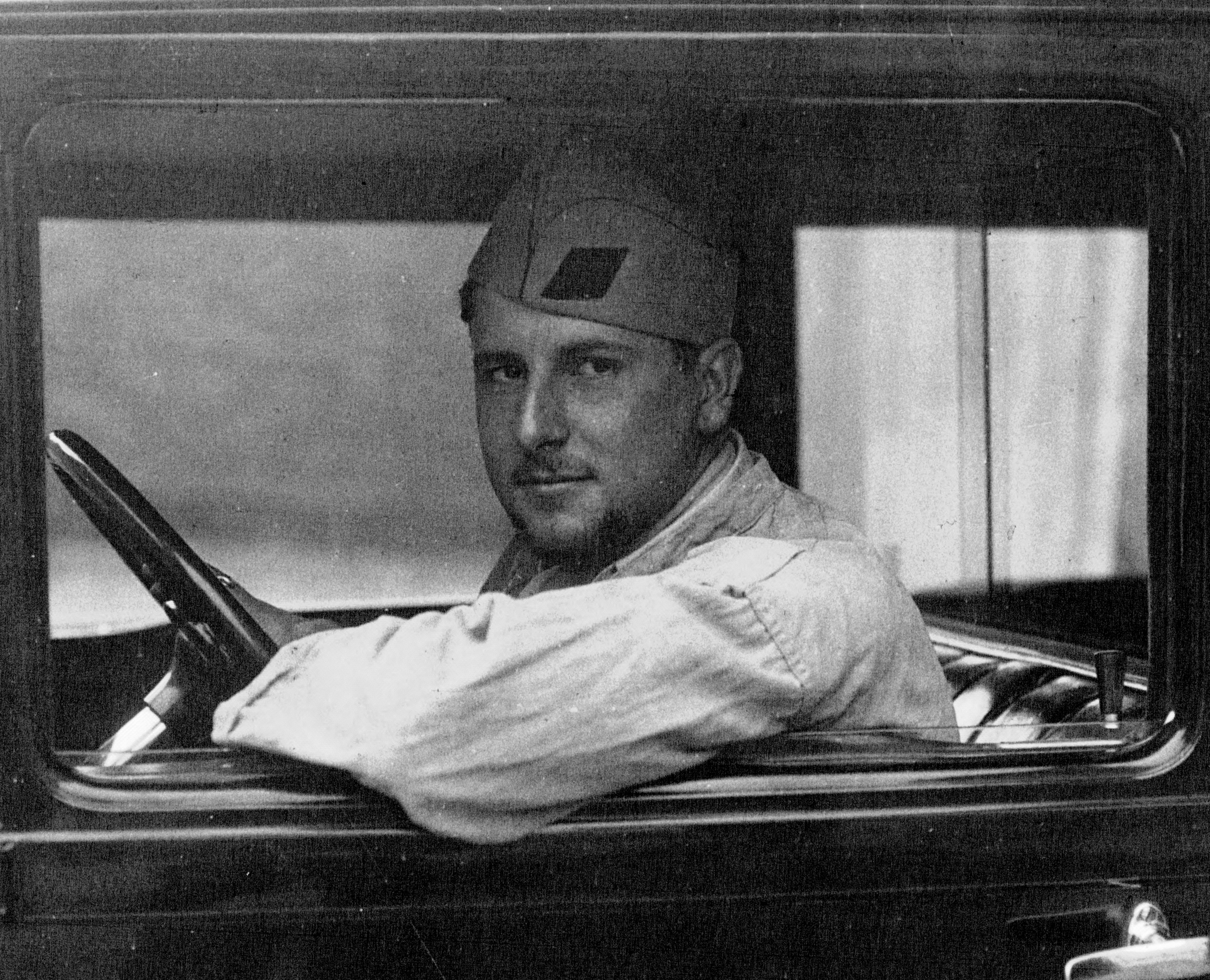
- Lebrun in 1932

Personal information
- Full name: Jacques Baptiste Lebrun
- Born: 20 September 1910 Paris, France
- Died: 14 January 1996 (aged 85) Neuilly-sur-Seine, France
- Height: 1.80 m (5 ft 11 in)
- Weight: 80 kg (176 lb)

Sailing career
- Sport: Sailing
- Club: CVP, Les Mureaux
- Class(es): Snowbird, O-Jolle, Swallow, Finn, 5.5 Metre
Medal record
Representing France
Olympic Games
Gold medal – first place	1932 Los Angeles	Snowbird
	1936 Kiel	O-Jolle (6th)
	1948 Torbay	Swallow (9th)
	1952 Helsinki	Finn (11th)
	1960 Enoshima	5.5 Metre (18th)

Jacques Baptiste Lebrun (20 September 1910 – 14 January 1996) was a French sailor. He competed at the 1932, 1936, 1948, 1952 and 1960 Olympics and won a gold medal in the snowbird event in 1932. He missed the 1956 Games for financial reasons.

Lebrun was a boat designer and eventually became technical director of the national sailing association. During World War II he helped to hide a significant part of the Louvre collection from the Germans.
