= Philip Rogers (sailor) =

Canadian sailor

Personal information
- Full name: Philip Tingley Rogers
- Nationality: Canadian
- Born: February 14, 1908 Vancouver, British Columbia, Canada
- Died: June 19, 1961 (aged 53) Vancouver, British Columbia

Sailing career
- Sport: Sailing
- Club: Royal Vancouver Yacht Club, Vancouver (CAN); UBC Thunderbirds, Vancouver (CAN)
- Class: 6 Metre
Medal record
Sailing
Representing Canada
Olympic Games
Bronze medal – third place	1932 Los Angeles	6 metre
- Updated on 22 March 2015

Philip Tingley Rogers (February 14, 1908 – June 19, 1961) was a sailor from Canada. He represented his country at the 1932 Summer Olympics in Los Angeles and earned a bronze medal in the 6 metre class.

== Sources ==
- "Philip Rogers Bio, Stats, and Results". Olympic Sports. Sports-Reference.com. Archived from the original on 18 April 2020.
