= Jacques Thubé =

French sailor

Medal record

Sailing

Representing France

Olympic Games
Gold medal – first place	1912 Stockholm	6 metre class

Jacques Thubé (22 June 1882 – 14 May 1969) was a French sailor who competed in the 1912 Summer Olympics. He was part of the French boat Mac Miche, which won the gold medal in the 6 metre class.
