= Owen Churchill =

American sailor

Medal record

Men's sailing

Representing the United States

Olympic Games
Gold medal – first place	1932 Los Angeles	8 metre class

Owen Porter Churchill (March 8, 1896 – November 22, 1985) was an American sailor who competed in the 1932 Summer Olympics.

In 1932 he was a crew member of the American boat Angelita which won the gold medal in the 8 metre class. Brother-in-law F. Pierpont Davis finished second to Churchill in tryouts, and Churchill incorporated Davis and his crew into his own during the Olympic events.

== Swim fin ==
In 1940 Churchill designed and patented the swim fin improving it from the earlier version made by Louis de Corlieu in 1935. With skin-diving's low popularity in America, he sold under a thousand pairs. He thought of the idea from seeing Tahitian boys using the same concept. They would use soft rubber and metal bands shaped like a fish tail. Churchill improved the shape and used vulcanized rubber.

The income from his then-patented and now-commonplace device let him pursue his passion of competitive sailing.

Churchill became the primary patron and team captain of the United States Olympic Yachting team at both the 1932 (Los Angeles) and 1936 (Berlin) Olympic Games. Churchill was also a lifetime member of Los Angeles Yacht Club, where memorabilia of his exploits has been on display. He was also a founding director or South Coast Corinthian Yacht Club. During the 1984 Olympic Games in Los Angeles, special recognition was given to Churchill by Peter Ueberroth for his lifelong efforts to promote sailing. Churchill's Star Fleet yacht, The Angelita, was fully restored for the occasion and re-christened at the time in Los Angeles harbor.
