= Robert Carlson (sailor) =

American sailor (1905–1965)

Olympic medal record

Sailing
Silver medal – second place	1932 Los Angeles	6 metre class

Robert Carlson (April 11, 1905 – April 14, 1965) was an American sailor who competed in the 1932 Summer Olympics.

In 1932 he was a crew member of the American boat Gallant which won the silver medal in the 6 metre class.
