= Gardner Boultbee =

Canadian sailor (1907–1980)

Jack Gardner Boultbee
- Born: April 23, 1907; British Columbia, Canada
- Died: August 1, 1980 (aged 73); Barbados
- Spouses: Stephanie Hope Barbara Hespeler (4 Aug 1931–unknown); Mabel H Larsen (1 Aug 1941-1980)
- Children: William Michael Boultbee (deceased); John Jeremy Boultbee (deceased); Elizabeth May Lye; Helen Ann McBride; Thea Janette Rousell; Gertrude Mary Nagurski; Kathleen Patricia Holland (deceased)
- Relatives: William Washington Boultbee (father); Florence Una Boultbee (mother)

Olympic medal record

Sailing
Bronze medal – third place	1932 Los Angeles	6 metre class

Jack Gardner Boultbee (April 23, 1907 – August 1, 1980) was a Canadian sailor who competed in the 1932 Summer Olympics. In 1932 he was a crew member of the Canadian boat Caprice which won the bronze medal in the 6 metre class.
