= Gilbert Laws (sailor) =

British sailor

Olympic medal record

Sailing

Representing Great Britain

Olympic Games
Gold medal – first place	1908 London	6 Metre

Gilbert Umfreville Laws (6 January 1870 – 3 December 1918) was a British sailor who competed in the 1908 Summer Olympics. He was the helmsman of the British boat Dormy, which won the gold medal in the 6 metre class.
