= Charles Van Den Bussche =

Belgian sailor

Medal record

Sailing

Representing Belgium

Olympic Games
Silver medal – second place	1920 Antwerp	6 metre (1919 rating)

Charles Van Den Bussche (18 October 1876 – 9 October 1958) was a Belgian sailor who competed in the 1920 Summer Olympics. He was a crew member of the Belgian boat Tan-Fe-Pah, which won the silver medal in the 6 metre class (1919 rating).
