= Snowbird (sailboat) =

Sailboat class

- S

Development
- Designer: Willis Reid; Edson B. Schock
- Location: United States
- Year: 1921
- No. built: More than 500 (wooden version); 28 (fiberglass version)
- Builders: Tom Broadway; G.Y. Johnson Boat Works; A.E. Hansen; South Coast Boat Works; W. D. Schock Corp
- Role: Racer
- Name: Snowbird

Boat
- Displacement: 130 lb (59 kg)
- Draft: 3.00 ft (0.91 m) with centerboard down

Hull
- Type: monohull
- Construction: fiberglass
- LOA: 11.95 ft (3.64 m)
- Beam: 5.00 ft (1.52 m)

Hull appendages
- Keel: centerboard
- Rudder: transom-mounted rudder

Rig
- Rig type: Bermuda rig

Sails
- Sailplan: catboat
- Mainsail area: 102.00 sq ft (9.476 m^{2})
- Total sail area: 102.00 sq ft (9.476 m^{2})

Racing
- Class association: One design

The Snowbird is an American sailboat that was initially designed by Willis Reid as a one design racer and first built in 1921. The boat was re-designed by Edson B. Schock in the 1940s and it became a popular junior class.

The boat was used as a one design competition class for sailing at the 1932 Summer Olympics.

== Design ==
The Snowbird is a racing sailing dinghy, with early versions built with wooden hulls and later ones with fiberglass hulls, with wood trim. It has a single sail catboat rig, a spooned plumb stem, a vertical transom, a transom-hung rudder controlled by a tiller and a retractable centerboard. The fiberglass version displaces 130 lb (59 kg).

The boat has a draft of 3.00 ft (0.91 m) with the centerboard extended and 4.56 in (11.6 cm) with it retracted, allowing operation in shallow water, beaching or ground transportation on a trailer or car roof.

For the 1932 Olympics boats were borrowed from local owners. The rig was modified, with a taller mast and a shorter boom and a new sail design, which was it thought would be better in the higher winds expected at the Olympic venue, Cabrillo Beach, in the Los Angeles Harbor. In later testing the Olympic rigs were found to be slower than the original design and no more were modified to that configuration after the games.

== Production and operational history ==
Reid's 1921 design was intended to be an inexpensive wooden boat, constructed by amateur builders. Plans for the boat were published in 1923 in The Rudder magazine. The boat originally had a bird for a sail badge, but this was soon changed to a red letter "S".

Considering that it would make a good children's racing boat, Jim Webster of the Newport Harbor Yacht Club, commissioned a local boat builder, Tom Broadway, to build four examples for $200 each. G.Y. Johnson Boat Works, also of Newport, California also built many. The Douglas Boat and Canoe Company started constructing Snowbirds in 1928. All of these wooden versions varied in construction and weight.

The Snowbird was then selected by the Los Angeles Olympic Games Committee for the 1932 Los Angeles Olympics for single-handed sailing with a modified mast and sail. These sails sported an "O" sail badge.

Local businessman C.B. "Bernie" McNally of Balboa Peninsula, Newport Beach commissioned Newport Beach boat builder A.E. Hansen to build ten boats for rental use in 1934 and Roland Vallely also had a fleet of rental Snowbirds built in 1935. South Coast Boat Works also built some Snowbirds in about 1939.

The McNally boats carried a black "Mc" sail badge in place of the normal red "S", while the Vallely boats had a turquoise letter "V".

Both of the 1930s rental fleets had been superseded by newer boats by about 1953, due to the age and condition of the old wooden hulls. Some of the ones in better condition were sold and were still sailing privately as late as 1960.

To bring in all the Snowbird owners, a Flight of the Snowbirds regatta was first organized in 1936. This event had 163 boats entered at its peak, in 1957. As the Snowbird fleet disappeared from service over time it was re-titled Flight of the Lasers.

By 1939, two active racing fleets existed; one at the Newport Harbor Yacht Club and the other at the Balboa Yacht Club. After the Second World War a third fleet was formed at the new Lido Yacht Club and there were inter-club regattas between the three clubs over the summers.

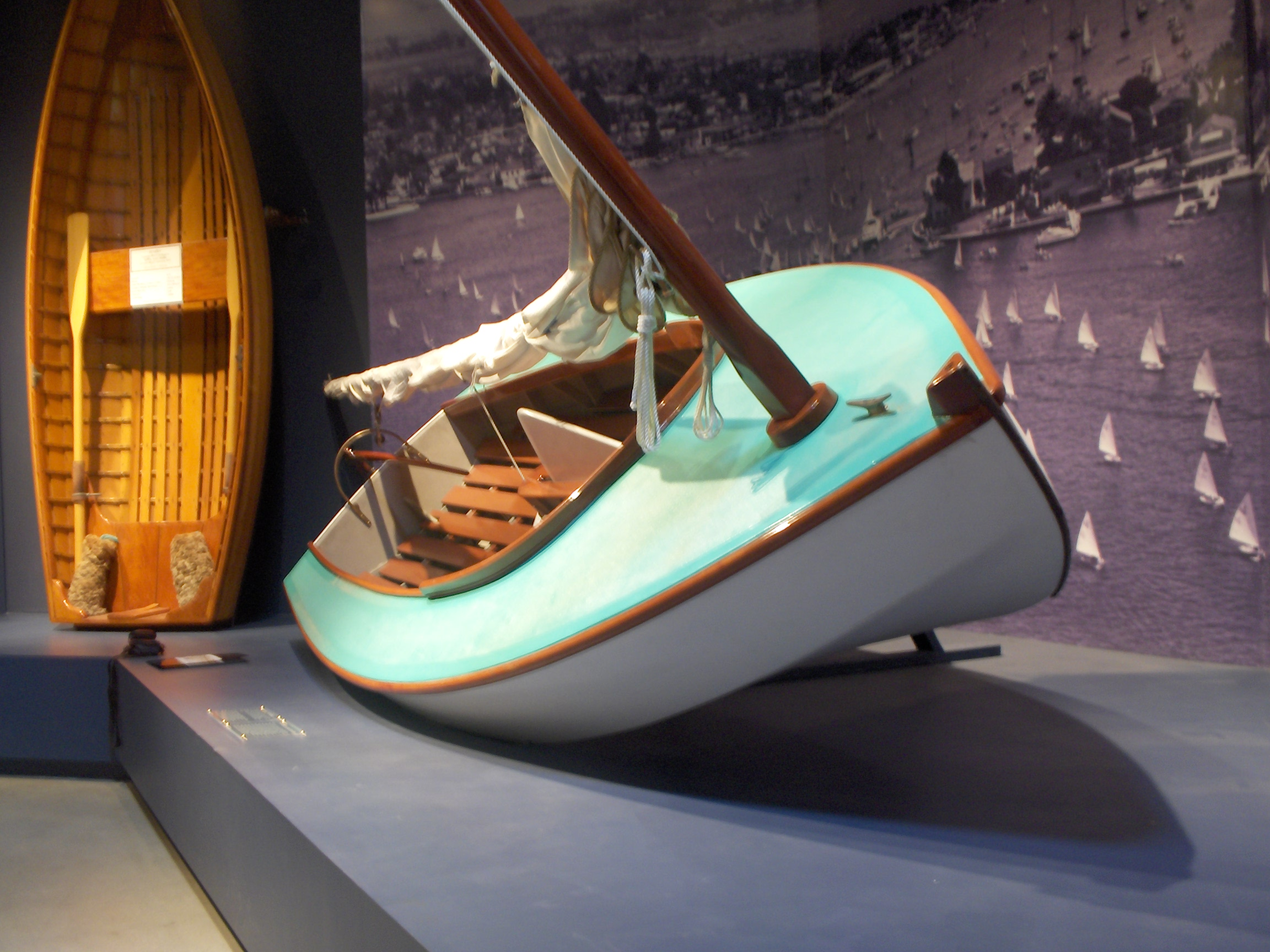
Snowbird number one, that was at one time on display in the Newport Harbor Nautical Museum, in California

Edson B. Schock modified the design in the 1940s and also published the plans in The Rudder magazine, which rekindled interest in the boat and it became popular as a youth sailing class in California with more than 500 wooden boats built in total. Between 1961 and 1966 W. D. Schock Corp built 28 examples with fiberglass hulls.

In a 2001 retrospective article in the Los Angeles Times, John Blaich wrote of the WD Schock fiberglass boats, "these were fast boats and were warmly received. They eliminated the need for sanding and painting the bottom of the wooden snowbirds every spring."

As a children's boat the 130 lb (59 kg) Snowbird proved heavy in service and hard for children to handle on land while launching and recovering and so it was replaced by lighter boats, like the 95 lb (43 kg) Naples Sabot and the 68 lb (31 kg) US Sabot.

By 2001 the wooden Snowbirds were all out of service and only one fiberglass one remained in use.

== Events ==
=== Olympic results ===
Games	Gold	Silver	Bronze
1932 Los Angeles	France (FRA); Jacques Lebrun	Netherlands (NED); Bob Maas	Spain (ESP); Santiago Amat

== See also ==
- List of sailing boat types
