= Norway at the 1924 Summer Olympics =

- IOC code: NOR
- NOC: Norwegian National Federation of Sports

in Paris
- Competitors: 62 (60 men, 2 women) in 10 sports
- Medals Ranked 7th: Gold 5 Silver 2 Bronze 3 Total 10

Summer Olympics appearances (overview)
- 1900; 1904; 1908; 1912; 1920; 1924; 1928; 1932; 1936; 1948; 1952; 1956; 1960; 1964; 1968; 1972; 1976; 1980; 1984; 1988; 1992; 1996; 2000; 2004; 2008; 2012; 2016; 2020; 2024

Other related appearances
- 1906 Intercalated Games

Norway competed at the 1924 Summer Olympics in Paris, France. 62 competitors, 60 men and 2 women, took part in 43 events in 10 sports.

== Medalists ==
Medal	Name	Sport	Event	Date
Gold	Otto von Porat	Boxing	Men's heavyweight	July 20
Gold	Christopher Dahl, Eugen Lunde, Anders Lundgren	Sailing	6 m Class	July 26
Gold	Rick Bockelie, Harald Hagen, Ingar Nielsen, Carl Ringvold, Carl Ringvold, Jr.	Sailing	8 m Class	July 26
Gold	Einar Liberg, Ole Lilloe-Olsen, Harald Natvig, Otto Olsen	Shooting	Men's 100 m team running deer, single shots	July 2
Gold	Ole Lilloe-Olsen	Shooting	Men's 100 m running deer, double shots	July 1
Silver	Henrik Robert	Sailing	Monotype Class	July 13
Silver	Einar Liberg, Ole Lilloe-Olsen, Harald Natvig, Otto Olsen	Shooting	Men's 100 m team running deer, double shots	July 3
Bronze	Sverre Hansen	Athletics	Men's long jump	July 8
Bronze	Sverre Sørsdal	Boxing	Men's light heavyweight	July 20
Bronze	Otto Olsen	Shooting	Men's 100 m running deer, single shots	July 10

== Athletics ==
Ten athletes represented Norway in 1924. It was the nation's fifth appearance in the sport as well as the Games. Hansen took the nation's only athletics medal of the Games, with a bronze in the long jump.

Ranks given are within the heat.

Athlete	Event	Heats		Quarterfinals		Semifinals		Final	
Athlete	Event	Result	Rank	Result	Rank	Result	Rank	Result	Rank
Erling Aastad	Long jump	N/A				6.72	4	Did not advance	
Ketil Askildt	Shot put	N/A				13.09	6	Did not advance	
Ketil Askildt	Discus throw	N/A				43.405	3 Q	43.405	5
Sverre Hansen	Long jump	N/A				7.26	1 Q	7.26	3rd place, bronze medalist(s)
Sverre Helgesen	High jump	N/A				1.83	1 Q	1.83	8
Charles Hoff	400 m	53.0	2 Q	49.2	2 Q	48.8	4	Did not advance	
Charles Hoff	800 m	N/A		2:02.1	3 Q	1:58.4	3 Q	1:56.7	8
Martin Mølster	Pentathlon	N/A						Elim-4	
Nils Andersen; Johan Badendyck; Hans Gundhus; Haakon Jansen	3000 m team	N/A				27	3	Did not advance	

== Boxing ==
Nine boxers represented Norway at the 1924 Games. It was the nation's second appearance in the sport. Von Porat became Norway's first Olympic boxing champion. Sørsdal, who had won a silver medal in 1920 to become Norway's first medalist in the sport, won his second medal (a bronze).

Boxer	Weight class	Round of 32	Round of 16	Quarterfinals	Semifinals	Final / Bronze match	
Boxer	Weight class	Opposition Score	Opposition Score	Opposition Score	Opposition Score	Opposition Score	Rank
Edgar Christensen	Welterweight	Colacicco (ITA); W	Mello (USA); L	Did not advance			9
Haakon Hansen	Lightweight	Eichholzer (AUT); W	Petersen (DEN); W	Nielsen (DEN); L	Did not advance		5
Olaf Hansen	Featherweight	Bye	Fields (USA); L	Did not advance			9
Øivind Jensen	Middleweight	Meeuwessen (NED); W	Henning (CAN); L	Did not advance			9
Kristoffer Nilsen	Lightweight	Beland (RSA); L	Did not advance				17
Alf Pedersen	Welterweight	Cornelisse (NED); L	Did not advance				17
Otto von Porat	Heavyweight	N/A	Jardine (AUS); W	Bertazzolo (ITA); W	Porzio (ARG); W	Petersen (DEN); W	1st place, gold medalist(s)
Sverre Sørsdal	Light heavyweight	Delarge (BEL); W	Kidley (IRL); W	Kirby (USA); W	Petersen (DEN); L	Saraudi (ITA); W	3rd place, bronze medalist(s)
Trygve Stokstad	Middleweight	Mallin (GBR); L	Did not advance				17

Opponent nation	Wins	Losses	Percent
Argentina	1	0	1.000
Australia	1	0	1.000
Austria	1	0	1.000
Belgium	1	0	1.000
Canada	0	1	.000
Denmark	2	2	.500
Great Britain	0	1	.000
Ireland	1	0	1.000
Italy	3	0	1.000
Netherlands	1	1	.500
South Africa	0	1	.000
United States	1	2	.333
Total	12	8	.600

Round	Wins	Losses	Percent
Round of 32	4	3	.571
Round of 16	3	3	.500
Quarterfinals	2	1	.667
Semifinals	1	1	.500
Final	1	0	1.000
Bronze match	1	0	1.000
Total	12	8	.600

== Fencing ==
Four fencers, all men, represented Norway in 1924. It was the nation's third appearance in the sport, and first since 1912. Heide and Lorentzen became the first Norwegian fencers to reach the semifinals.

Men

Ranks given are within the pool.

Fencer	Event	Round 1		Round 2		Quarterfinals		Semifinals		Final	
Fencer	Event	Result	Rank	Result	Rank	Result	Rank	Result	Rank	Result	Rank
Sigurd Akre-Aas	Épée	4–4	2 Q	N/A		4–5	8	Did not advance			
Sigurd Akre-Aas	Foil	1–3	4	Did not advance							
Sigurd Akre-Aas	Sabre	N/A				2–3	5	Did not advance			
Johan Falkenberg	Épée	3–6	9	N/A		Did not advance					
Johan Falkenberg	Foil	2–1	2 Q	2–3	4	Did not advance					
Raoul Heide	Épée	5–4	3 Q	N/A		7–3	1 Q	5–6	7	Did not advance	
Frithjof Lorentzen	Épée	1–8	9	N/A		Did not advance					
Frithjof Lorentzen	Foil	1–2	3 Q	4–1	2 Q	2–3	4 Q	0–5	6	Did not advance	
Sigurd Akre-Aas; Johan Falkenberg; Raoul Heide; Frithjof Lorentzen	Team épée	0.5–1.5	3	N/A		Did not advance					

== Modern pentathlon ==
Two pentathletes represented Norway in 1924. It was the nation's third appearance in the sport. Norway was one of six nations to have competed in each edition of the Olympic modern pentathlon to that point.

Pentathlete	Event	Final	
Pentathlete	Event	Score	Rank
Leif Knudtzon	Individual	99.5	21
Olliver Smith	Individual	87.5	16

== Sailing ==
Nine sailors, the maximum possible, represented Norway in 1924. It was the nation's fourth appearance in the sport. All three Norwegian boats won medals, with two taking gold and one earning silver. It was the second consecutive Games that each Norwegian boat had medalled.

Sailor	Event	Qualifying				Final			
Sailor	Event	Race 1	Race 2	Race 3	Total	Race 1	Race 2	Total	Rank
Henrik Robert	Olympic monotype	1 Q	4	N/A		2	5	7	2nd place, silver medalist(s)
Christopher Dahl; Eugen Lunde; Anders Lundgren	6 metre class	3	1 Q	1 Q	5	1	1	2	1st place, gold medalist(s)
Rick Bockelie; Harald Hagen; Ingar Nielsen; Carl Ringvold; Carl Ringvold, Jr.	8 metre class	2 Q	4	1 Q	7	1	1	2	1st place, gold medalist(s)

== Shooting ==
Shooter	Event	Final	
Shooter	Event	Score	Rank
Halvard Angaard	600 m free rifle	83	19
Eivind Holmsen	Trap	90	19
Olaf Johannessen	50 m rifle, prone	375	45
Olaf Johannessen	600 m free rifle	78	41
Einar Liberg	25 m rapid fire pistol	18	8
Einar Liberg	100 m deer, single shots	36	7
Einar Liberg	100 m deer, double shots	70	5
Ole Lilloe-Olsen	100 m deer, single shots	33	15
Ole Lilloe-Olsen	100 m deer, double shots	76	1st place, gold medalist(s)
Ole Lilloe-Olsen	Trap	94	11
Harald Natvig	100 m deer, single shots	36	7
Harald Natvig	100 m deer, double shots	62	9
Otto Olsen	600 m free rifle	73	51
Otto Olsen	100 m deer, single shots	39	3rd place, bronze medalist(s)
August Onsrud	50 m rifle, prone	385	26
August Onsrud	600 m free rifle	79	35
Willy Røgeberg	50 m rifle, prone	388	18
Olaf Sletten	50 m rifle, prone	385	26
Martin Stenersen	Trap	90	19
Oluf Wesmann-Kjær	100 m deer, double shots	59	13
Oluf Wesmann-Kjær	Trap	92	16
Halvard Angaard; Olaf Johannessen; Ludvig Larsen; Otto Olsen; Willy Røgeberg	Team free rifle	594	8
Einar Liberg; Ole Lilloe-Olsen; Harald Natvig; Otto Olsen	Team deer, single shots	160	1st place, gold medalist(s)
Einar Liberg; Ole Lilloe-Olsen; Harald Natvig; Otto Olsen	Team deer, double shots	262	2nd place, silver medalist(s)
Eivind Holmsen; Ole Lilloe-Olsen; Harald Natvig; Martin Stenersen; Oluf Wesmann-Kjær	Team clay pigeons	336	7

== Swimming ==
Ranks given are within the heat.

Men

Swimmer	Event	Heats		Semifinals		Final	
Swimmer	Event	Result	Rank	Result	Rank	Result	Rank
Sven Thaulow	100 m backstroke	1:24.0	1 Q	1:24.2	5	Did not advance	

== Tennis ==
Men

Athlete	Event	Round of 128	Round of 64	Round of 32	Round of 16	Quarterfinals	Semifinals	Final	
Athlete	Event	Opposition Score	Opposition Score	Opposition Score	Opposition Score	Opposition Score	Opposition Score	Opposition Score	Rank
Conrad Langaard	Singles	Fyzee (IND); L 2–6, 2–6, 3–6	Did not advance						
Jack Nielsen	Singles	Bye	Tegner (DEN); W 5–7, 6–4, 6–4, 9–7	Borotra (FRA); W 6–0, 6–1, 6–2	Did not advance				
Conrad Langaard; Jack Nielsen	Doubles	—N/a	Bye	Muhammad / Rutnam (IND); L 2–6, 3–6, 0–6	Did not advance				

Women

Athlete	Event	Round of 64	Round of 32	Round of 16	Quarterfinals	Semifinals	Final	
Athlete	Event	Opposition Score	Opposition Score	Opposition Score	Opposition Score	Opposition Score	Opposition Score	Rank
Caro Dahl	Singles	Bye	Vlasto (FRA); L 1–6, 0–6	Did not advance				
Molla Mallory	Singles	Bye	Vaussard (FRA); W 6–2, 6–3	Bouman (NED); W 9–7, 6–0	Wills Moody (USA); L 2–6, 3–6	Did not advance		

Mixed

Athlete	Event	Round of 32	Round of 16	Quarterfinals	Semifinals	Final	
Athlete	Event	Opposition Score	Opposition Score	Opposition Score	Opposition Score	Opposition Score	Rank
Caro Dahl; Conrad Langaard	Doubles	Valaoritou-Skaramaga / Zerlentis (GRE); L 6–4, 2–6, 2–6	Did not advance				
Molla Mallory; Jack Nielsen	Doubles	Dupont / Washer (BEL); W 1–6, 6–3, 6–3	Jessup / Richards (USA); L 3–6, 2–6	Did not advance			

== Wrestling ==
=== Greco-Roman ===
Men's

Athlete	Event	First round	Second round	Third round	Fourth round	Fifth round	Sixth round	Seventh round	Eighth round	Rank
Athlete	Event	Opposition Result	Opposition Result	Opposition Result	Opposition Result	Opposition Result	Opposition Result	Opposition Result	Opposition Result	Rank
Martin Egeberg	Featherweight	Bye	Radvány (HUN); L	Řezáč (TCH); W	Svensson (SWE); L	Did not advance				=8
Arne Gaupset	Lightweight	Friman (FIN); L	Bergmann (AUT); W	Beránek (TCH); W	Sesta (AUT); W	Kusnets (EST); L	Did not advance	—N/a		=5
Paul Jahren	Middleweight	Gorgano (ITA); W	Kónyi (HUN); L	Gorletti (ITA); L	Did not advance				—N/a	=15
Sven Martinsen	Bantamweight	Zervinis (GRE); W	Andersen (DEN); W	Dierickx (BEL); L	Ikonen (FIN); L	Did not advance		—N/a		=9
Erling Michelsen	Lightweight	Frisenfeldt (DEN); L	Solé (ESP); L	Did not advance				—N/a		=20
Arthur Nord	Featherweight	Radvány (HUN); W	Řezáč (TCH); W	Väli (EST); W	Naito (JPN); W	Capron (FRA); W	Malmberg (SWE); L	Anttila (FIN); L	Did not advance	4
Ragnvald Olsen	Bantamweight	Ponte (ITA); W	Skopový (TCH); L	Kueny (FRA); W	Dierickx (BEL); W	Ikonen (FIN); L	Did not advance	—N/a		=5
