= Sailing at the 1924 Summer Olympics =

Sailing at the Games of the VIII Olympiad
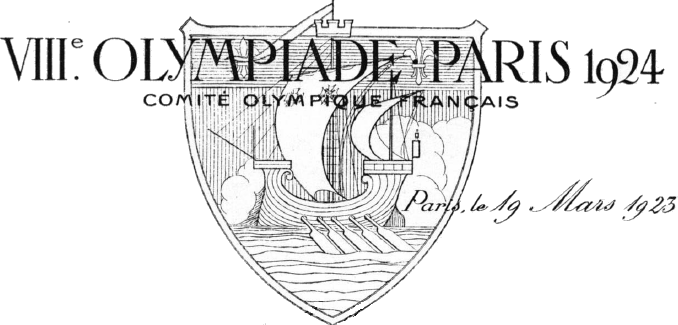
- Letterhead VIIIe Olympiade Paris 1924
- Venues: Meulan; Le Havre
- Dates: First race: 10 July 1924 (Meulan); Last race: 13 July 1924; First race: 21 July 1924 (Le Havre); Last race: 26 July 1924
- Competitors: 62 Male and 1 Female from 19 nations
- Boats: 31

Sailing/Yachting is an Olympic sport starting from the Games of the 1st Olympiad (1896 Olympics in Athens, Greece). With the exception of 1904 and the canceled 1916 Summer Olympics, sailing has always been included on the Olympic schedule. The Sailing program of 1924 consisted of a total of three sailing classes (disciplines). For each of the classes the event an elimination round, semi-finals and finals were scheduled. The French National Monotype 1924 was on the program from 10 to 13 July. The Metre classes (6 and 8) had their races from 21 to 26 July.

== Venue ==
=== Meulan ===
Cercle de la Voile de Paris Bassin Olympique de Meulan Les Mureaux
- Burgee of the Cercle de la Voile de Paris
- Interactive map of the Cercle de la Voile de Paris; Bassin Olympique de Meulan Les Mureaux area

General information
- Status: Completed
- Type: Club House
- Location: 30, quai Albert Glandaz, 78130 Les Mureaux, France
- Coordinates: 49°00′1″N 1°54′54″E
- Elevation: Sealevel
- Completed: 14 May 1894
- Owner: Cercle de la Voile de Paris

Meulan was the venue for the Olympic regatta's in the French National Monotype. The host club for the 1924 Olympic Sailing at Meulan was the Cercle de la Voile de Paris. Like in 1900 the race conditions at Meulan during the Olympic regatta were not ideal. The light breeze during the first elimination series could hardly make the sailing interesting. When the wind picked up in the second series the conditions must have improved. During the first semi-final the wind came from South East. As a result, the yachts could sail most of the course without tacking or jibing, therefore not challenging the capabilities of the sailors. In the second semi-final however the wind shifted to East-North-East so that tacking was needed in the final legs of the laps.

=== Le Havre ===
La Société des Régates du Havre Le Havre
- Burgee of the Société des Régates du Havre

- Interactive map of the La Société des Régates du Havre; Le Havre area

General information
- Status: Destroyed
- Type: Club House
- Location: Le Palais de la Société des Régates au Havre (The clubhouse) was used in 1914 and 1940 as British Army hospital. Bombed in 1940 and finally destroyed in 1942., France
- Coordinates: 49°29′30″N 0°5′45″E
- Elevation: Sealevel
- Owner: La Société des Régates du Havre

Le Havre was the venue for the Olympic regattas for the 6 and 8 Metre. The host club for the 1924 Olympic Sailing at Le Havre was the Société des Régates du Havre. Due to the Easterly winds the courses at Le Havre were mostly reaches. As result sailing a windward leg was not really tested. This however was more or less custom for that time.

=== Course areas ===
1924 Olympic Course Areas

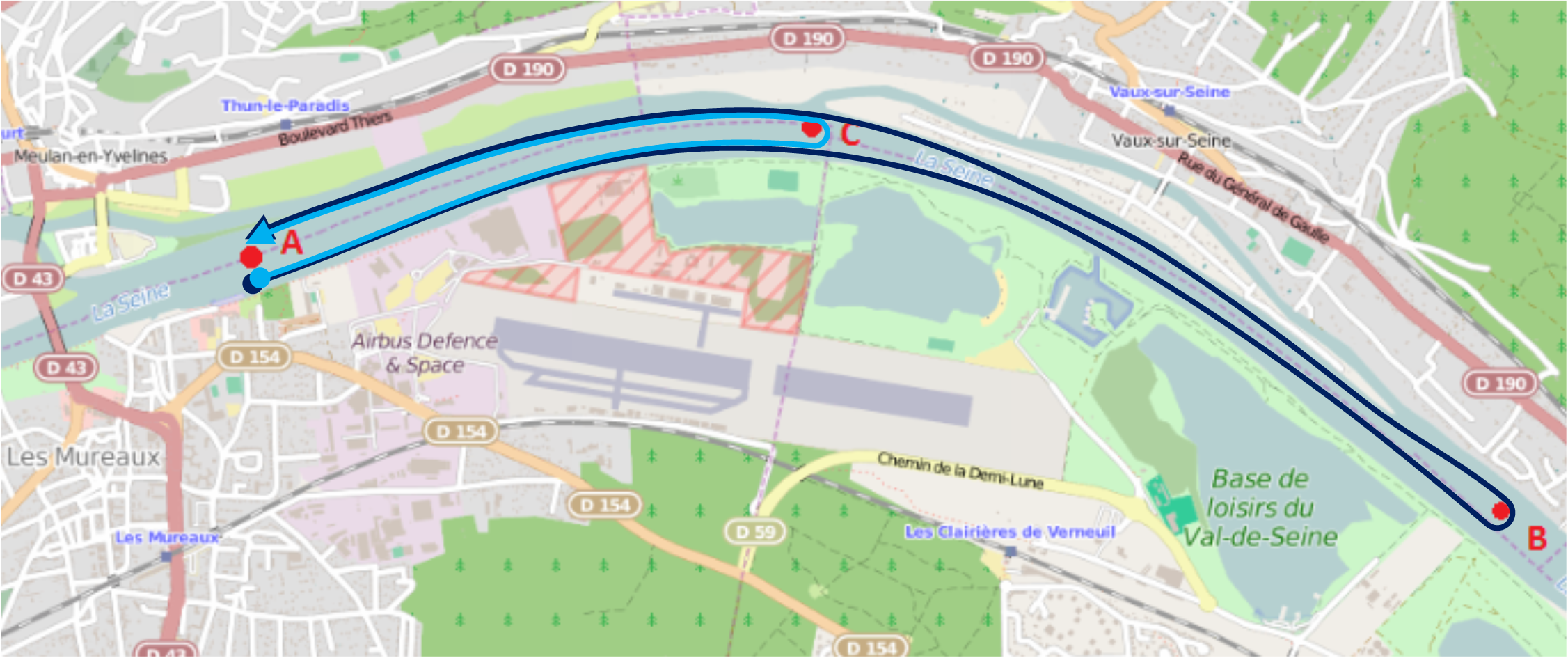
Courses at Plan du Bassin du Meulan les Mureaux
A: Start and Finish
B: Mark large course 4.0 nautical miles (7.4 km)
C: Mark small course 1.6 nautical miles (3.0 km)

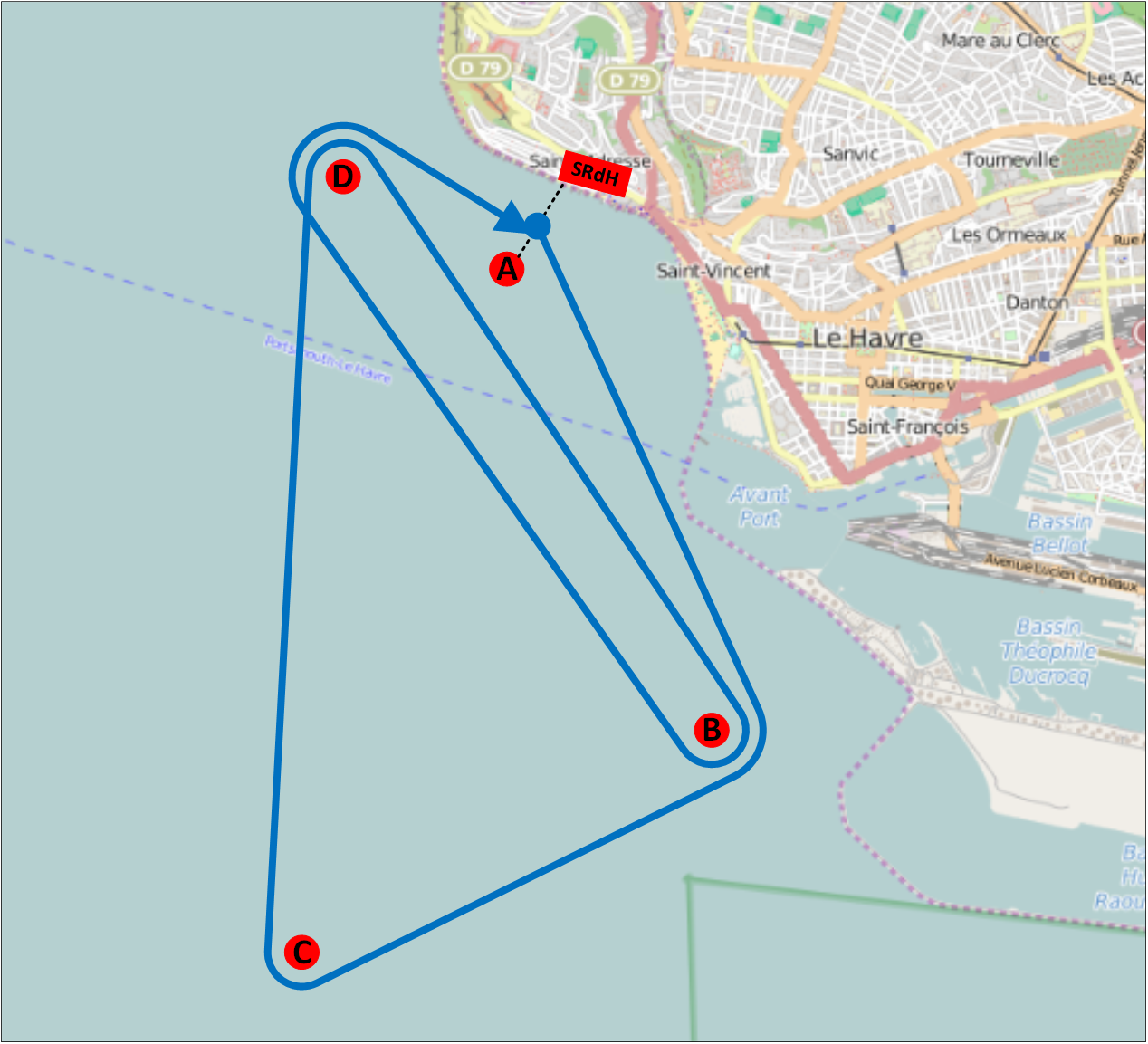
6 Metre Course at Le Havre
SRdH: La Société des Régates du Havre
A: Start and Finish
B, C D: Marks
10 nautical miles (19 km)

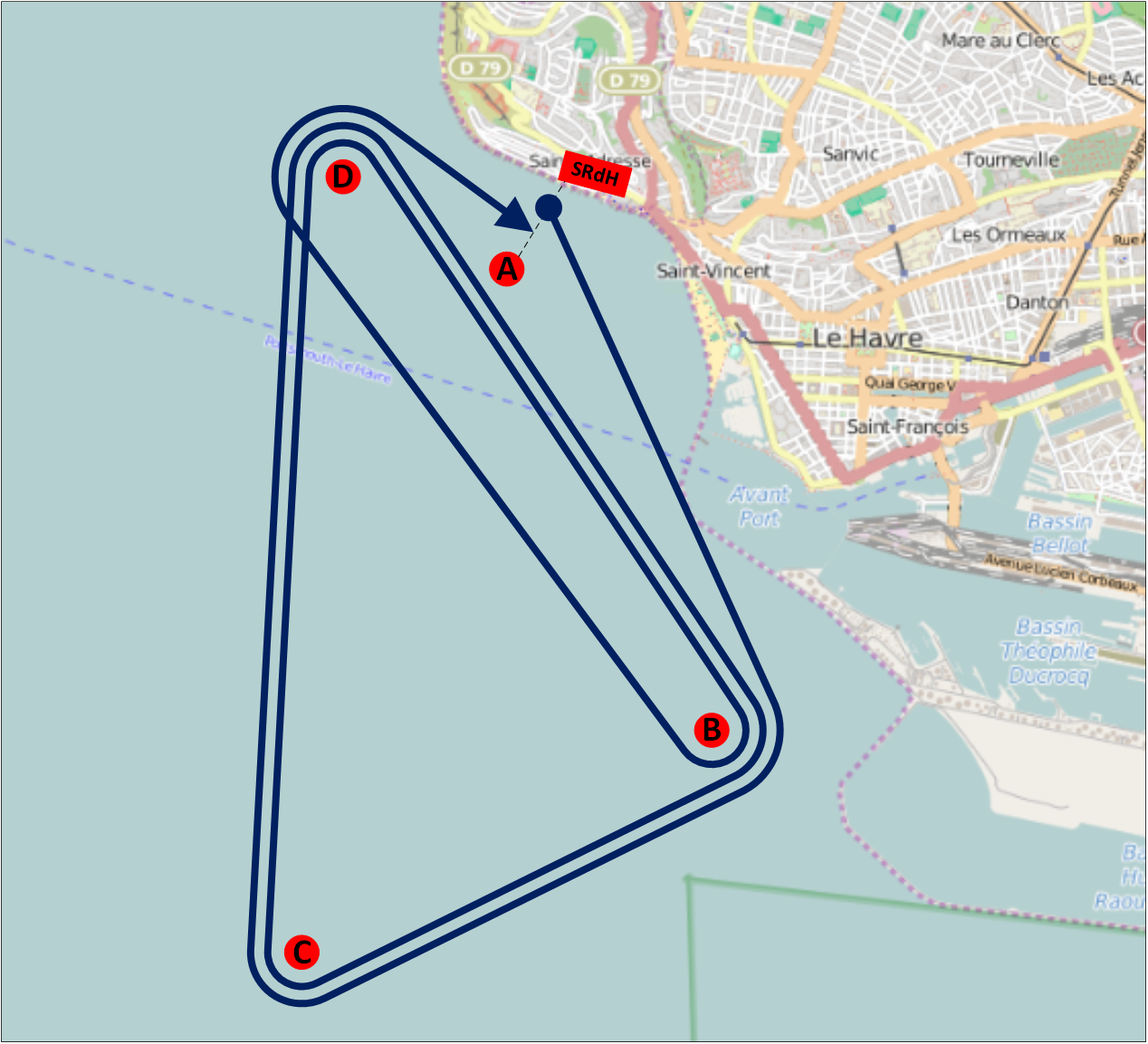
8 Metre Course at Le Havre
SRdH: La Société des Régates du Havre
A: Start and Finish
B, C D: Marks
16 nautical miles (30 km)

== Competition ==
=== Overview ===
Continents	Countries	Classes	Entries	Male	Female
4	19	3	31	62	1

This was the first Olympic where just one boat per country per class was allowed.

=== Continents ===
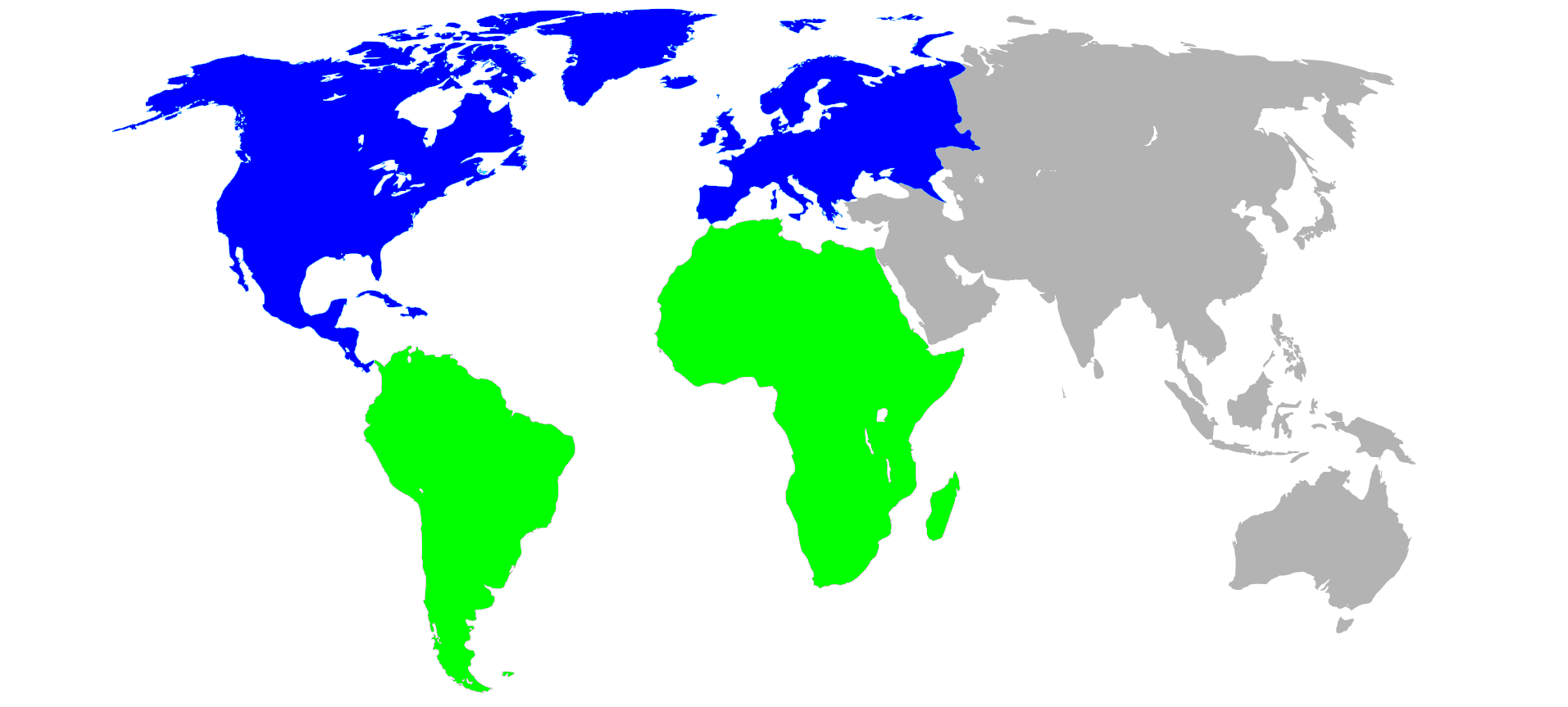
Map of Participating Sailing Continents at the 1924 Summer Olympics ● Green = Participating for the first time ● Blue = Participating ● Light Blue = Have previously participated

● Africa
● Europe
● North America
● South America

=== Countries ===
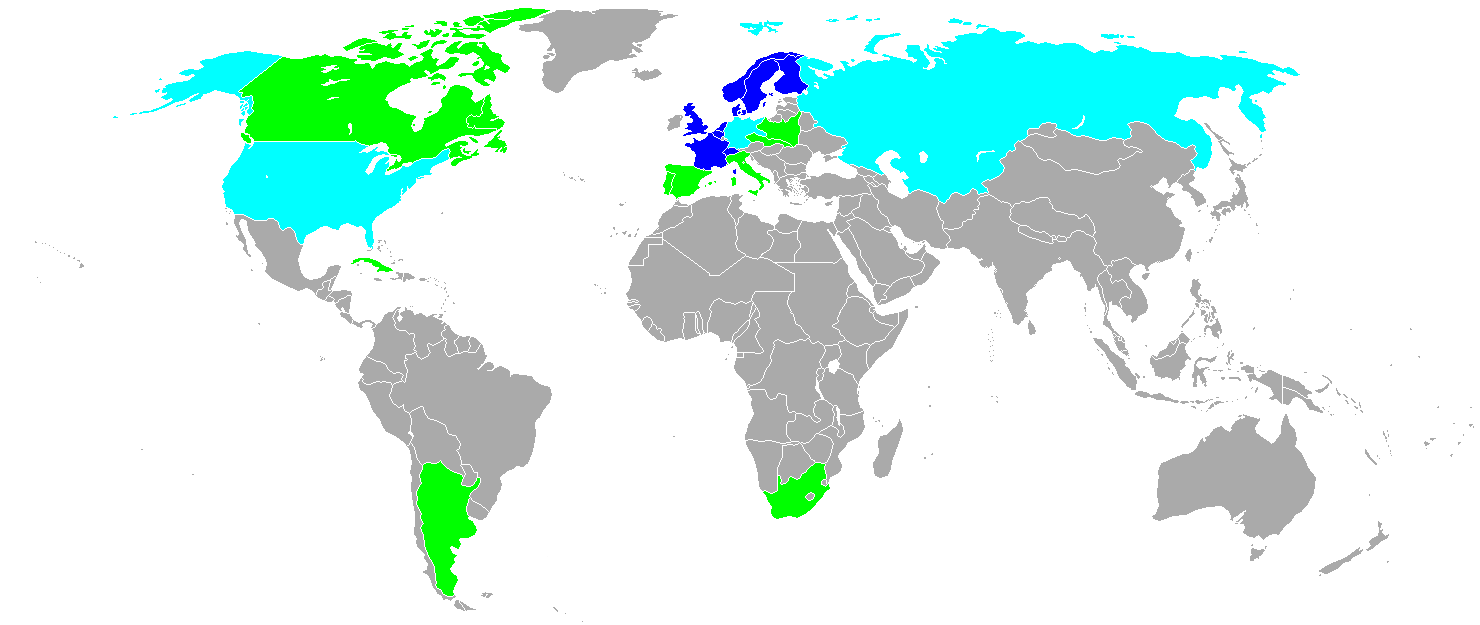
Map of Participating Sailing Countries at the 1924 Summer Olympics ● Green = Participating for the first time ● Blue = Participating ● Light Blue = Have previously participated

- Argentina (5)
- Belgium (8)
- Canada (1)
- Cuba (3)
- Czechoslovakia (1)
- Denmark (4)
- Finland (1)
- France (9)
- Great Britain (5)
- Italy (3)
- Monaco (1)
- Netherlands (4)
- Norway (9)
- Poland (1)
- Portugal (1)
- South Africa (1)
- Spain (3)
- Switzerland (1)
- Sweden (4)

=== Classes (equipment) ===
After the enormous number of classes used during the Olympic sailing event of 1920 the International Yacht Racing Union decided that for 1924 just three classes would be used. The choice was made in favor of two Metre classes (6 and 8) and monotype (One Design) class.

The 1924 Olympic classes
Class	Type	Venue	Event	Sailors	First OG	Olympics so far
French National Monotype	Dinghy	Meulan		1	1924	1
6 Metre	Keelboat	Le Havre		3	1908	4
8 Metre	Keelboat	Le Havre		5	1908	4
Legend: = Mixed gender event
The 1924 Olympic Classes in action French National Monotype 1924 6 Metre 8 Metre

== Race schedule ==
●	Opening ceremony	●	Event competitions	●	Event finals	●	Closing ceremony

Date	July																						
Date	5 Sat	6 Sun	7 Mon	8 Tue	9 Wed	10 Thu	11 Fri	12 Sat	13 Sun	14 Mon	15 Tue	16 Wed	17 Thu	18 Fri	19 Sat	20 Sun	21 Mon	22 Tue	23 Wed	24 Thu	25 Fri	26 Sat	27 Sun
Date						Meulan											Le Havre						
Sailing						●	●	●	●								● ●	● ●	● ●		● ●	● ●	
Total gold medals									1													2	
Ceremonies	●																						●

== Medal summary ==
Event	Gold	Silver	Bronze
1924: Monotype	Belgium (BEL); Léon Huybrechts	Norway (NOR); Henrik Robert	Finland (FIN); Hans Dittmar
1924: 6 Metre	Norway (NOR); Anders Lundgren; Christopher Dahl; Eugen Lunde	Denmark (DEN); Vilhelm Vett; Knud Degn; Christian Nielsen	Netherlands (NED); Johan Carp; Anthonij Guépin; Jan Vreede
1924: 8 Metre	Norway (NOR); Carl Ringvold; Rick Bockelie; Harald Hagen; Ingar Nielsen; Carl Ringvold Jr.	Great Britain (GBR); Ernest Roney; Harold Fowler; Edwin Jacob; Thomas Riggs; Walter Riggs	France (FRA); Louis Breguet; Pierre Gauthier; Robert Girardet; André Guerrier; Georges Mollard

== Medal table ==
Rank	Nation	Gold	Silver	Bronze	Total
1	Norway	2	1	0	3
2	Belgium	1	0	0	1
3	Denmark	0	1	0	1
3	Great Britain	0	1	0	1
5	Finland	0	0	1	1
5	France	0	0	1	1
5	Netherlands	0	0	1	1
Totals (7 entries)		3	3	3	9

The official report used a point system to give participating nations an overall rank in the sport:

Rank	Country	1st place		2nd place		3rd place		4th place		5th place		6th place		Total
Rank	Country	Places	Points	Places	Points	Places	Points	Places	Points	Places	Points	Places	Points	Points
1	Norway	2	20	1	5									25
2	Belgium	1	10					1	3	1	1½			14½
3	Netherlands					1	4			1	2			6
4	France					1	4			1	1½			5½
5	Denmark			1	5									5
5	Great Britain			1	5									5
7	Finland					1	4							4
8	Sweden							1	3			1	1	4
9	Spain							1	3					3
10	Argentina									1	2			2

== Notes ==
The Norwegian Lunde Olympic dynasty
- Eugen Lunde, the first of the Olympic dynasty of Norwegian Lunde sailors:
  - His son and daughter in law, Peder Lunde and Vibeke "Babben" Lunde, sailed together in the 1952 Olympics in the 5.5 Metre.
    - His grandson, Peder Lunde Jr. won the gold in the Flying Dutchman in 1960 and the silver in the Star in 1968
      - His great-granddaughter, Jeanette Lunde picked up Olympic sailing after an Olympic career in Downhill and Super-G. She sailed in the 470 at the 2000 Olympics.

== Other information ==
- Italy was also entered in the 8 Metre. However, they did not participate.
- Germany was not invited.
- This is the first Olympic regatta where only one boat per class per country is allowed.

=== Sailors ===
During the sailing regattas at the 1924 Summer Olympics among others the following persons were competing in the various classes:

- Switzerland, one of the great 20th century's adventurer, travel writer and photographer, as well as a sportswoman, Ella Maillart
- Belgium, three times Olympic medalist, Léon Huybrechts
- France, the famous French aircraft manufacturer and engineer, Louis Breguet
Sailors during the 1924 Olympic Games
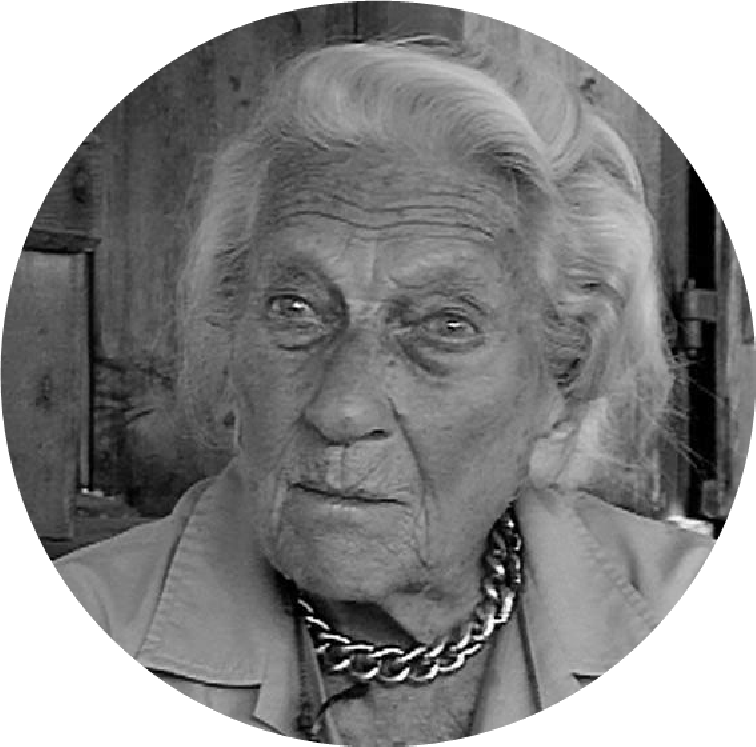
Ella Maillart in 1992

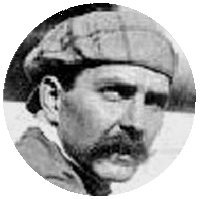
Louis Breguet in 1909

Léon Huybrechts
