= Sailing at the 1924 Summer Olympics – 8 Metre =

8 Metre at the Games of the VIII Olympiad
- Line drawing of the 8 Metre
- Venue: France, Le Havre
- Dates: First race: 21 July 1924; Last race: 26 July 1924
- Competitors: 25 from 5 nations
- Teams: 5

Medalists
1st place, gold medalist(s)		Carl Ringvold; Rick Bockelie; Harald Hagen; Ingar Nielsen; Carl Ringvold Jr.	Norway
2nd place, silver medalist(s)		Ernest Roney; Harold Fowler; Edwin Jacob; Thomas Riggs; Walter Riggs	Great Britain
3rd place, bronze medalist(s)		Louis Bréguet; Pierre Gauthier; Robert Girardet; André Guerrier; Georges Mollard	France

The 8 Metre was a sailing event on the Sailing at the 1924 Summer Olympics program in Le Havre. A program of matches and semi-finals were scheduled. In case of a tie sail-off's could be held. 25 sailors, on 5 boats from 5 nations competed. A sixth entry from Italy did not show.

== Race schedule ==
●	Elimination serie (E)	●	Semi-finals (SF) and Sail-off (SO)

Date	July					
Date	21 Mon	22 Tue	23 Wed	24 Thu	25 Fri	26 Sat
Date	Le Havre					
8 Metre	M1	M2	M3	Spare day	SF1	SF2
Total gold medals						1

== Course area and course configuration ==
1924 Olympic Course Area for the 8 Metre off the coast of Le Havre

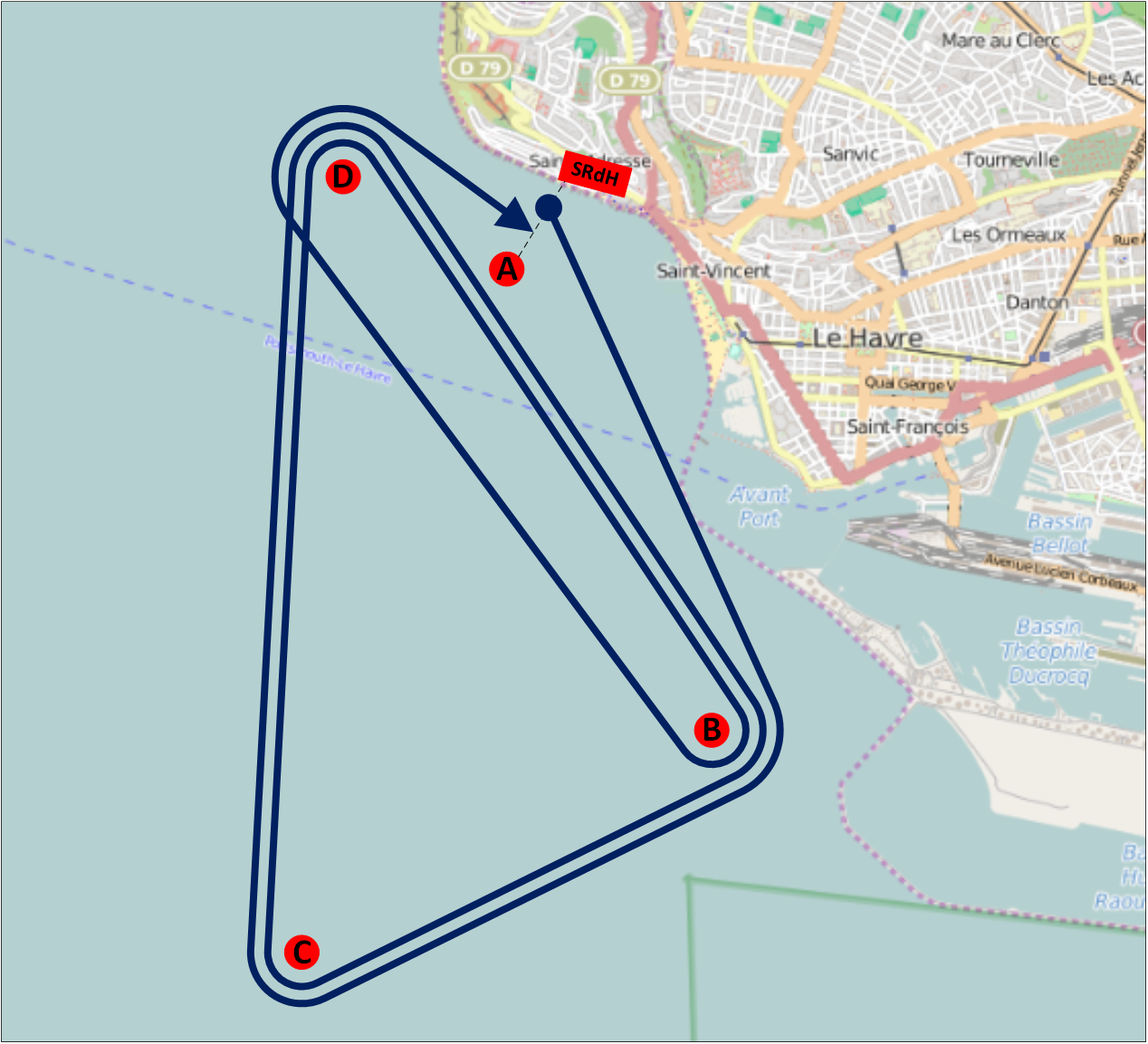
8 Metre Course at Le Havre
SRdH: La Société des Régates du Havre
A: Start and Finish
B, C D: Marks
16 nautical miles (30 km)

== Weather conditions ==
Date	Race	Wind speed	Wind direction	Start
21-JUL-1924	1st Match	1 metre per second (1.9 kn) - 4 metres per second (7.8 kn)		14:00
22-JUL-1924	2nd Match	1 metre per second (1.9 kn) - 4 metres per second (7.8 kn)		14:00
23-JUL-1924	3rd Match	5 metres per second (9.7 kn)		14:45
25-JUL-1924	1st Semi-final	4 metres per second (7.8 kn)		14:45 (shortened course 14 nautical miles (26 km))
26-JUL-1924	2nd Semi-final	5 metres per second (9.7 kn) - 6 metres per second (12 kn)		15:00

== Results ==
=== Final results ===
Competitors who scored a first or a second place in the matches were qualified (Q) for the semi-finals.

Rank	Country	Helmsman	Crew	Sail No.	Boat	Race 1		Race 2		Race 3		Race 4		Race 5		Total
Rank	Country	Helmsman	Crew	Sail No.	Boat	Pos.	Pts.	Pos.	Pts.	Pos.	Pts.	Pos.	Pts.	Pos.	Pts.	Total
1st place, gold medalist(s)	Norway	Carl Ringvold	Rick Bockelie; Harald Hagen; Ingar Nielsen; Carl Ringvold Jr.	N.12	Béra	2	Q	4		1	Q	1	1	1	1	2
2nd place, silver medalist(s)	Great Britain	Ernest Roney	Harold Fowler; Edwin Jacob; Thomas Riggs; Walter Riggs	K.1	Emily	3		1	Q	2		2	2	3	3	5 (Tie breaker=6)
3rd place, bronze medalist(s)	France	Louis Bréguet	Pierre Gauthier; Robert Girardet; André Guerrier; Georges Mollard	F.3	Namousse	1	Q	5		2	Q	3	3	2	2	5 (Tie breaker=8)
4	Belgium	Fernand Carlier	Maurice Passelecq; Emmanuel Pauwels; Paul Van Halteren; Victor Vanderslyen	B.1	Antwerpia V	5		2	Q	RET	5	4	4	4	4	8
5	Argentina	Juan Carlos Milberg	Rolando Aguirre; César Gérico; Bernardo Milhas; Mario Uriburu	A.3	Blue Red	4		3		4						
	Italy	G. Gino	R. Giuseppe; B.B. Marcantonio; S. Mauro; S.F. Riccardo		Sirdhana	DNC		DNC		DNC						

Legend: DNC – Did not come to the starting area; DNS – Did not start; RET – Retired;

=== Daily standings ===
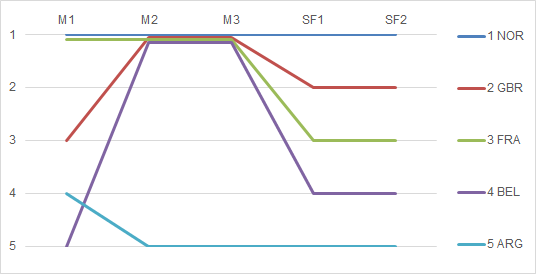
Graph showing the daily standings in the 8 Metre during the 1924 Summer Olympics

== Notes ==
- This is the first Olympic regatta where only one boat per class per country is allowed.
- In the 8 Metre, each boat has a specific design that have to stay within certain formula. The outcome of the formula must be less than 8 Metre. During these Olympic races, boats were used of the following designers:

Country	Sailnumber	Designer
Norway	N.12	Johan Anker
Great Britain	K.1	William Fife
France	F.3	Arbaut
Belgium	A.3	William Fife
Argentina	B.1	Camper & Nicholson
Italy		Costaguta

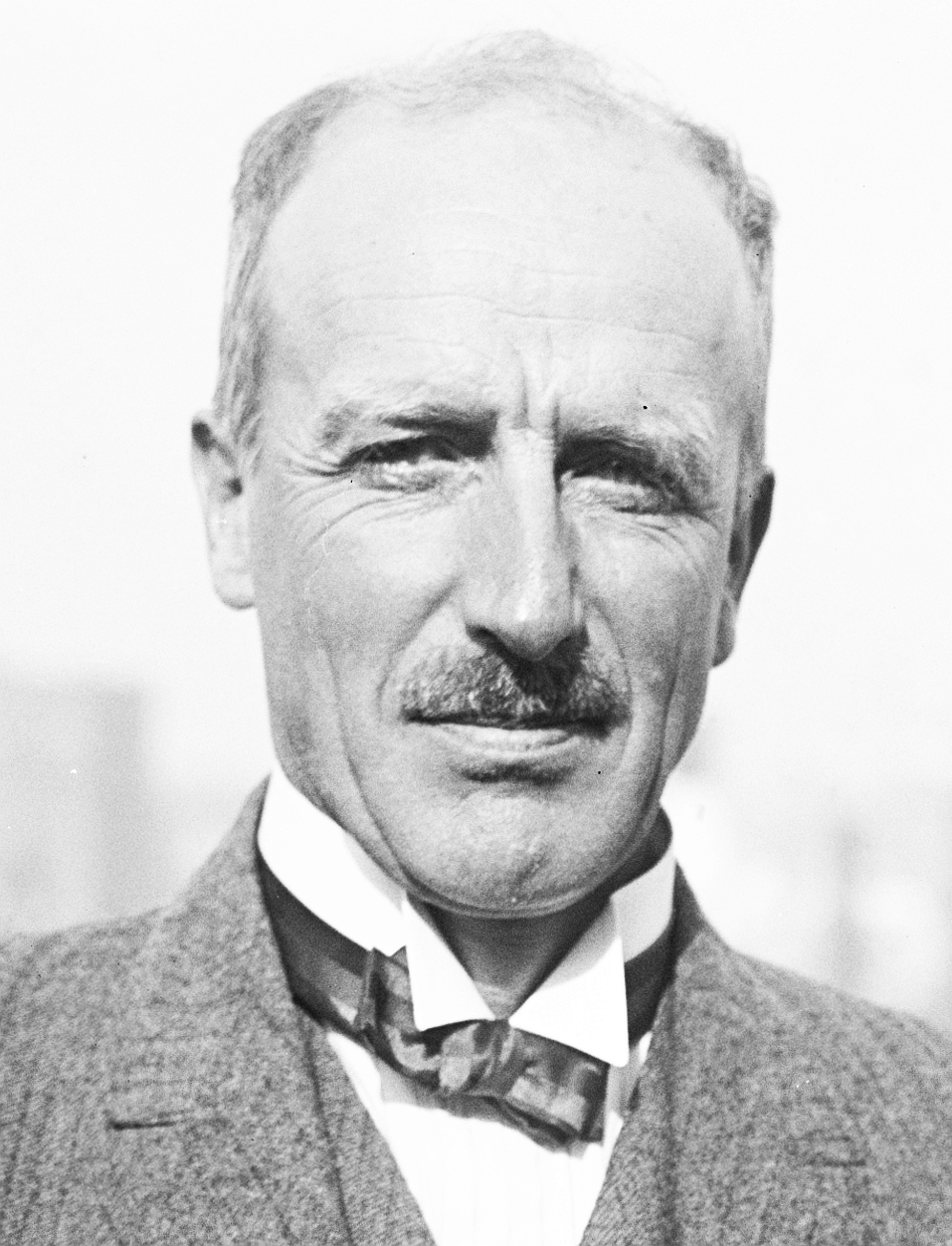
Johan Anker

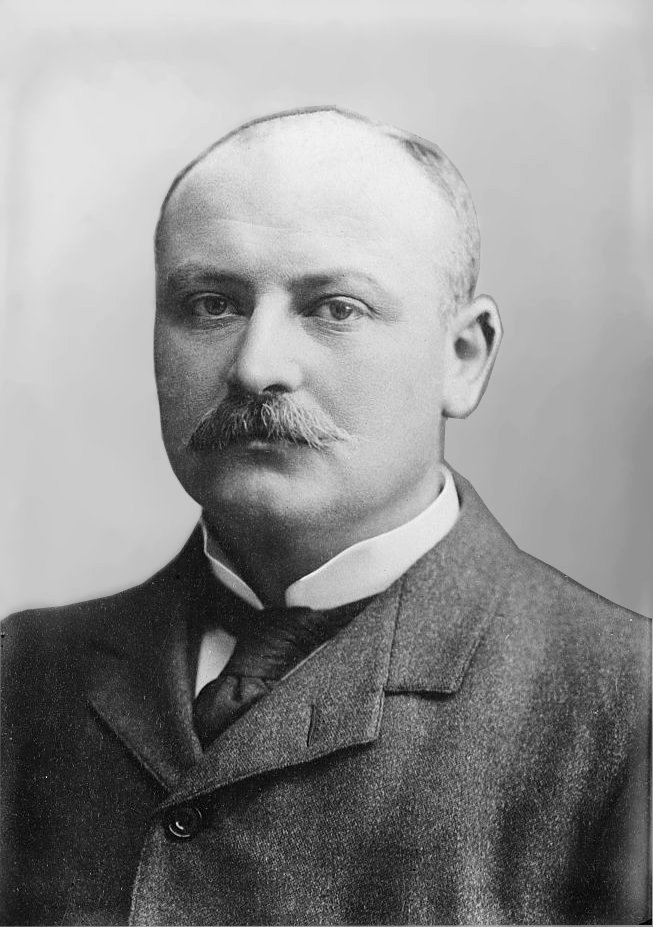
William Fife III

== Other information ==
During the Sailing regattas at the 1924 Summer Olympics, among others, the following persons were competing in the various classes:

8 Metre sailors at the 1924 Olympic Games
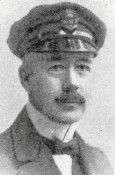
Carl Ringvold (NOR)

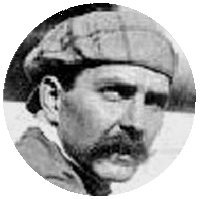
Louis Breguet (FRA) in 1909
