= Wrestling at the 1924 Summer Olympics – Men's Greco-Roman bantamweight =

Wrestling at the Olympics

Men's bantamweight Greco-Roman wrestling at the Games of the VIII Olympiad
- Venue: Vélodrome d'Hiver
- Dates: July 6–10, 1924
- Competitors: 25 from 15 nations

Medalists
1st place, gold medalist(s)		Eduard Pütsep	Estonia
2nd place, silver medalist(s)		Anselm Ahlfors	Finland
3rd place, bronze medalist(s)		Väinö Ikonen	Finland

The men's Greco-Roman bantamweight was a Greco-Roman wrestling event held as part of the Wrestling at the 1924 Summer Olympics programme. It was the first appearance of the event. Bantamweight was the lightest category, including wrestlers weighing up to 58 kilograms.

== Results ==
Source: Official results; Wudarski

The tournament was double-elimination.

=== First round ===
Losses	Winner	Victory Type	Loser	Losses
0	Armand Magyar (HUN)	Decision	Arvid Östman (SWE)	1
0	Johannes van Maaren (NED)	Decision	Alberts Krievs (LAT)	1
0	Sven Martinsen (NOR)	Decision	Georgios Zervinis (GRE)	1
0	Henri Dierickx (BEL)	Decision	Hermann Andersen (DEN)	1
0	Adolf Herschmann (AUT)	Decision	Mazhar Çakin (TUR)	1
0	Georg Gundersen (DEN)	Fall (9:50)	Jan Bozděch (TCH)	1
0	Ragnvald Olsen (NOR)	Decision	Carlo Ponte (ITA)	1
0	Théo Kueny (FRA)	Fall (15:20)	Antonín Skopový (TCH)	1
0	Eduard Pütsep (EST)	Fall (4:00)	Pierre Slock (BEL)	1
0	Väinö Ikonen (FIN)	Decision	Giovanni Gozzi (ITA)	1
0	Anton Koolmann (EST)	Fall (13:10)	Gérardo Apruzzese (FRA)	1
0	Anselm Ahlfors (FIN)	Decision	Sigfrid Hansson (SWE)	1
0	József Tasnádi (HUN)	Bye	N/A	–

=== Second round ===
25 wrestlers began this round. In the 12 matches, 8 wrestlers suffered their second loss in this round and were eliminated. 4 wrestlers suffered their first loss (including Gundersen, who withdrew). 9 wrestlers continued undefeated, while 3 won whilst avoiding elimination and a further one-loss wrestler received a bye.

Losses	Winner	Victory Type	Loser	Losses
0	József Tasnádi (HUN)	Decision	Arvid Östman (SWE)	2
0	Armand Magyar (HUN)	Decision	Alberts Krievs (LAT)	2
0	Johannes van Maaren (NED)	Decision	Georgios Zervinis (GRE)	2
0	Sven Martinsen (NOR)	Decision	Hermann Andersen (DEN)	2
0	Henri Dierickx (BEL)	Fall (11:17)	Mazhar Çakin (TUR)	2
0	Adolf Herschmann (AUT)	withdrew	Georg Gundersen (DEN)	1
1	Jan Bozděch (TCH)	Decision	Carlo Ponte (ITA)	2
1	Antonín Skopový (TCH)	Decision	Ragnvald Olsen (NOR)	1
0	Théo Kueny (FRA)	Decision	Pierre Slock (BEL)	2
0	Eduard Pütsep (EST)	Decision	Väinö Ikonen (FIN)	1
1	Giovanni Gozzi (ITA)	Decision	Anton Koolmann (EST)	1
0	Anselm Ahlfors (FIN)	Fall (8:18)	Gérardo Apruzzese (FRA)	2
1	Sigfrid Hansson (SWE)	Bye	N/A	–

=== Third round ===
9 wrestlers began this round with no losses, 7 with one loss.

4 wrestlers suffered their second loss in this round and were eliminated. 5 wrestlers continued undefeated, 3 won whilst avoiding elimination, and 4 suffered their first loss.

Losses	Winner	Victory Type	Loser	Losses
1	Sigfrid Hansson (SWE)	Decision	Armand Magyar (HUN)	1
0	József Tasnádi (HUN)	Decision	Johannes van Maaren (NED)	1
0	Henri Dierickx (BEL)	Decision	Sven Martinsen (NOR)	1
0	Adolf Herschmann (AUT)	Decision	Jan Bozděch (TCH)	2
1	Ragnvald Olsen (NOR)	Fall (1:00)	T. Kueny (FRA)	1
0	Eduard Pütsep (EST)	Decision	Antonín Skopový (TCH)	2
1	Väinö Ikonen (FIN)	Decision	Anton Koolmann (EST)	2
0	Anselm Ahlfors (FIN)	Decision	Giovanni Gozzi (ITA)	2

=== Fourth round ===
5 wrestlers began this round with no losses, 7 with one loss.

Of the 6 matches, one pitted undefeated wrestlers against each other. Two involved two wrestlers who each had one loss. The remaining three were contested by an undefeated wrestler against one facing elimination, resulting in one elimination and two men receiving their first loss.

This resulted in 2 wrestlers keeping their undefeated status and 3 being eliminated. 3 men received their first loss and 4 won while avoiding elimination.

Losses	Winner	Loser	Losses
1	Sigfrid Hansson (SWE)	József Tasnádi (HUN)	1
1	Armand Magyar (HUN)	Johannes van Maaren (NED)	2
1	Ragnvald Olsen (NOR)	Henri Dierickx (BEL)	1
0	Adolf Herschmann (AUT)	T. Kueny (FRA)	2
1	Väinö Ikonen (FIN)	Sven Martinsen (NOR)	2
0	Eduard Pütsep (EST)	Anselm Ahlfors (FIN)	1

=== Fifth round ===
2 wrestlers began this round with no losses, 7 with one loss (6 after Dierickx withdrew).

Of the four matches, two involved both wrestlers facing elimination and two pitted an undefeated wrestler against a man with one loss. The latter two resulted in one elimination and one wrestler taking his first loss. In all, 4 wrestlers (including Dierickx) were eliminated. One wrestler continued undefeated, one had his first loss, and three survived elimination.

Losses	Winner	Loser	Losses
1	Sigfrid Hansson (SWE)	Adolf Herschmann (AUT)	1
1	Anselm Ahlfors (FIN)	József Tasnádi (HUN)	2
0	Eduard Pütsep (EST)	Armand Magyar (HUN)	2
1	Väinö Ikonen (FIN)	Ragnvald Olsen (NOR)	2
–	Abandoned	Henri Dierickx (BEL)	–

=== Sixth round ===
1 wrestler began this round with no losses, 4 with one loss (3 after Herschmann withdrew).

One match was certain elimination, while the other pitted the undefeated Pütsep against the one-loss Hansson. Pütsep defeated Hansson to remain undefeated, while Ahlfors survived elimination by eliminating Ikonen.

This round was the last. Pütsep, who had defeated Ahlfors already, won the gold. Ahlfors placed second. Ikonen took bronze over Hansson based on number of wins, as Ikonen had advanced without a bye while Hansson had received a bye.

Losses	Winner	Loser	Losses
0	Eduard Pütsep (EST)	Sigfrid Hansson (SWE)	2
1	Anselm Ahlfors (FIN)	Väinö Ikonen (FIN)	2
–	Abandoned	Adolf Herschmann (AUT)	–
