= Anton Koolmann =

Estonia sport wrestler (1899 – 1953)

Personal information
- Born: 11 September 1899 Kasispea, Estonia
- Died: 29 June 1953 (aged 53) Wellington, New Zealand
Medal record
Men's Wrestling
National Championships
Gold medal – first place	1924 Tallinn	Greco-Roman wrestling -57kg

Koolmann

Anton Koolmann (11 September 1899 – 29 June 1953) was a wrestler and coach from Kuusalu Parish, Estonia who took part at the 1924 Summer Olympics in Paris, France.

== Career ==
1924 after winning Estonian Greco-Roman wrestling championships he participated at the 1924 Summer Olympics in Paris, France:

Men's Greco-Roman bantamweight (-58 kg)

- First round– defeated French champion Georges Appruzeze France by fall 13min 10s.
- Second round– lost to 1932 Summer Olympics champion Giovanni Gozzi Italy with points.
- Third round– lost to 1921 world champion and later Bronze medalist Väinö V. Ikonen Finland with points. (→ did not advance, 13.-16. place)

Men's freestyle featherweight (-61 kg)

- 1/8 Final round– lost to later Gold medalist Robin Reed United States
- Tournament to 2nd place – First round– lost to later Silver medalist Chester Newton United States. (→ did not advance, 10. place)

After Olympics he didn't return to home, but arrived, according to The Estonian Archives in Australia (EAA), 16 February 1925 from Campbeltown to Adelaide, Australia on the four-masted Barque "Carthpool" (Sister ship of Lawhill).

In Australia within the first fortnight of his career as a professional wrestler Koolmann won in seven successive championship matches, two state championships, three Victorian and two Australasian amateur championships. He won Australian middleweight championstitle from Hughie Whitman.

15 October 1928 he moved to New Zealand and got citizenship in 1933.

1934 he wrestled against former NWA World Heavyweight Champion Gus "The Goat" Sonnenberg.

In the late 1930s, he trained many New Zealand wrestling champions in his Koolman's Gym in Wellington. Among them Ernie "Kiwi" Kingston and from 1951 Maori professional heavyweight wrestler Keita Meretana of Wairoa.

He died suddenly in his home at age 53 in Wellington, New Zealand.

== Sport achievements ==
Year	Tournament	Venue	Result	Event
1924	Estonian National Championships	Tallinn, Estonia	1st	Greco-Roman wrestling / -57 kg
1924	Olympic Games	Paris, France	10th	Men's freestyle featherweight -61 kg
1924	Olympic Games	Paris, France	13-16th	Men's Greco-Roman bantamweight -58 kg
