= Ringvold =

Ringvold is a Norwegian surname. Notable people with the surname include:

- Carl Ringvold (1876–1960), Norwegian sailor
- Carl Ringvold Jr. (1902–1961), Norwegian sailor
- Ingunn Ringvold (born 1979), Norwegian singer, musician, and songwriter
