= Sailing at the 1924 Summer Olympics – 6 Metre =

6 Metre at the Games of the VIII Olympiad
- Line drawing of the 6 Metre
- Venue: France, Le Havre
- Dates: First race: 21 July 1924; Last race: 26 July 1924
- Competitors: 27 from 9 nations
- Teams: 9

Medalists
1st place, gold medalist(s)		Anders Lundgren; Christopher Dahl; Eugen Lunde	Norway
2nd place, silver medalist(s)		Vilhelm Vett; Knud Degn; Christian Nielsen	Denmark
3rd place, bronze medalist(s)		Johan Carp; Anthonij Guépin; Jan Vreede	Netherlands

The 6 Metre was a sailing event on the Sailing at the 1924 Summer Olympics program in Le Havre. A program of matches and semi-finals were scheduled. In case of a tie sail-off's would be held. 27 sailors, on 9 boats from 9 nations competed.

== Race schedule ==
●	Elimination serie (E)	●	Semi-finals (SF)

Date	July					
Date	21 Mon	22 Tue	23 Wed	24 Thu	25 Fri	26 Sat
Date	Le Havre					
6 Metre	M1	M2	M3	Spare day	SF1	SF2
Total gold medals						1

== Course area and course configuration ==
1924 Olympic Course Area for the 6 Metre off the coast of Le Havre

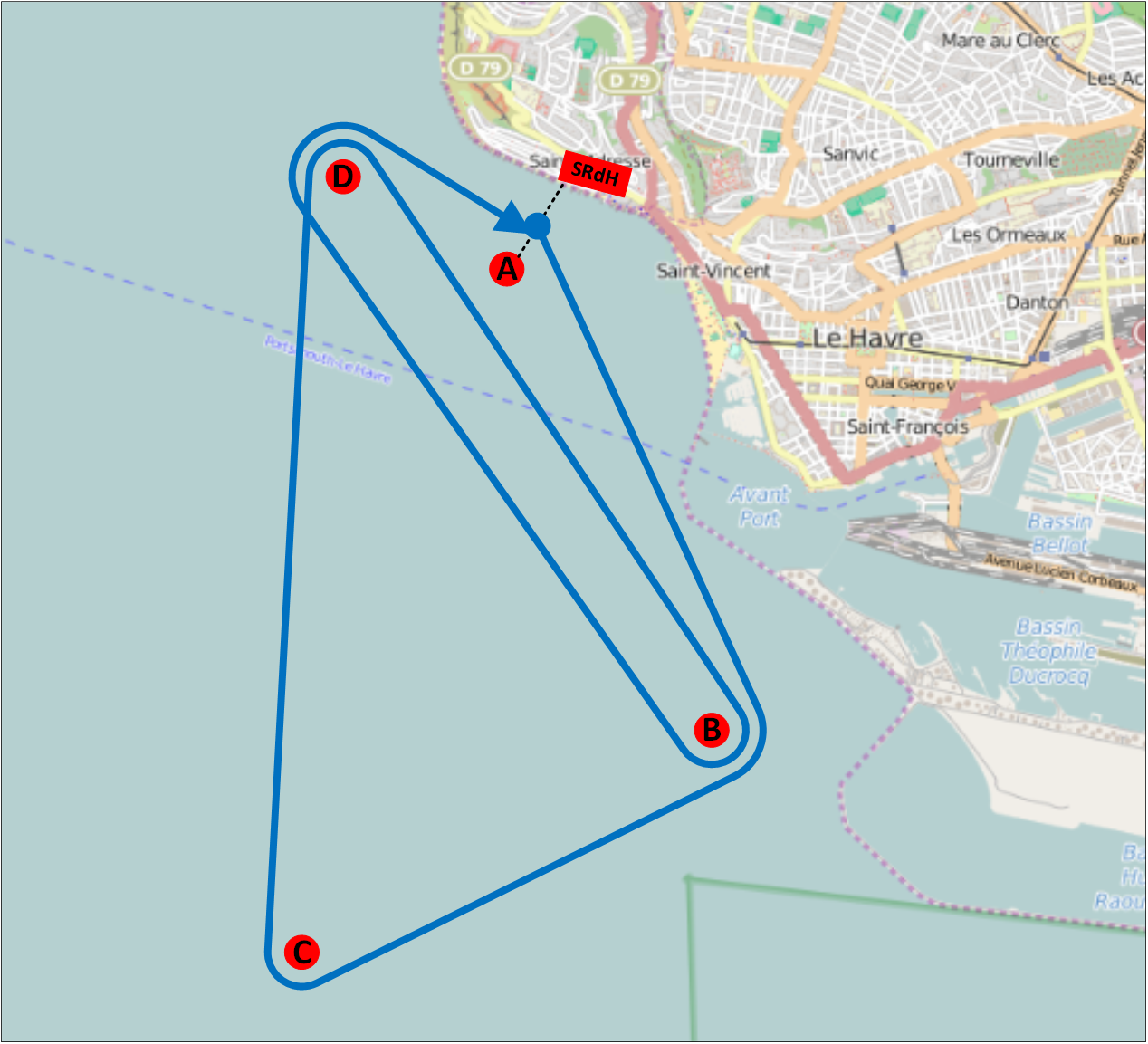
6 Metre Course at Le Havre
SRdH: La Société des Régates du Havre
A: Start and Finish
B, C D: Marks
10 nautical miles (19 km)

== Weather conditions ==
Date	Race	Wind speed	Wind direction	Start
21-JUL-1924	1st Match	1 metre per second (1.9 kn) – 4 metres per second (7.8 kn)		14:14
22-JUL-1924	2nd Match	1 metre per second (1.9 kn) – 4 metres per second (7.8 kn)		14:15
23-JUL-1924	3rd Match	4 metres per second (7.8 kn)		15:00
25-JUL-1924	1st Semi-final	9 metres per second (17 kn)		15:00
26-JUL-1924	2nd Semi-final	5 metres per second (9.7 kn)		15:15

== Results ==
=== Final results ===
Competitors who scored a first or a second place in the matches were qualified (Q) for the semi-finals.

Rank	Country	Helmsman	Crew	Sail No.	Boat	Race 1		Race 2		Race 3		Race 4		Race 5		Total
Rank	Country	Helmsman	Crew	Sail No.	Boat	Pos.	Pts.	Pos.	Pts.	Pos.	Pts.	Pos.	Pts.	Pos.	Pts.	Total
1st place, gold medalist(s)	Norway	Anders Lundgren	Christopher Dahl; Eugen Lunde	N.13	Elisabeth V	3		1	Q	1	Q	1	1	1	1	2
2nd place, silver medalist(s)	Denmark	Vilhelm Vett	Knud Degn; Christian Nielsen	D.22	Bonzo	1	Q	2	Q	RET		3	3	2	2	5
3rd place, bronze medalist(s)	Netherlands	Johan Carp	Anthonij Guépin; Jan Vreede	H.2	Willem-Six	2	Q	RET		2	Q	2	2	3	3	5
4	Sweden	Nils Rinman	Magnus Hellström; Olle Rinman	S.5	Aloha II	4	4	4	4	4	4					12
5	Belgium	Léon Huybrechts	John Klotz; Léopold Standaert	B.3	Ciss	6	6	7	7	3	3					16
5	France	Edmond Moussié	Guy Herpin; Honoré Louit	F.70	Sandra	8	8	3	3	5	5					16
	Italy	Carlo Nasi	Cencio Massola; Roberto Moscatelli	I.30	Mebi	5	5	5	5	RET	8					18
	Spain	Arturo Mas	Santiago Amat; Pedro Pi	E.8	Alnolgavar	7	7	6	6	RET	8					21
	Cuba	Enrique Conill	Pedro Cisneros; Antonio Saavedra	C.4	Hatuey	RET	9	8	4	DNS	9					26

Legend: DNS – Did not start; RET – Retired;

=== Daily standings ===
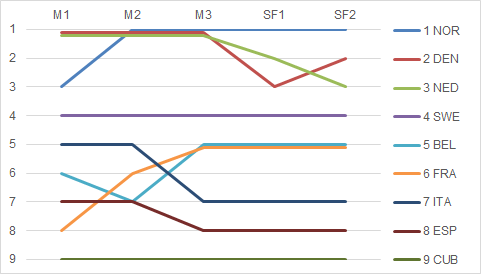
Graph showing the daily standings in the 6 Metre during the 1924 Summer Olympics

== Notes ==
In the 6 Metre class each boat has a specific design that must lie within a certain formula, which uses various parameters specifying the design. The outcome of the formula must be less than 6 Metres. During the 1924 Summer Olympic races, boats were used of the following designers:

Country	Sailnumber	Designer
Norway	N.13	Bjarne Aas
Denmark	D.22	William Fife
Netherlands	H.2	William Fife
Sweden	S.5	Axel Nygren
Belgium	B.3	William Fife
France	F.70	Morgan Morgan-Giles
Italy	I.30	Francesco Giovanelli
Spain	E.8	Anker & Jensen
Cuba	C.4	Arbaut

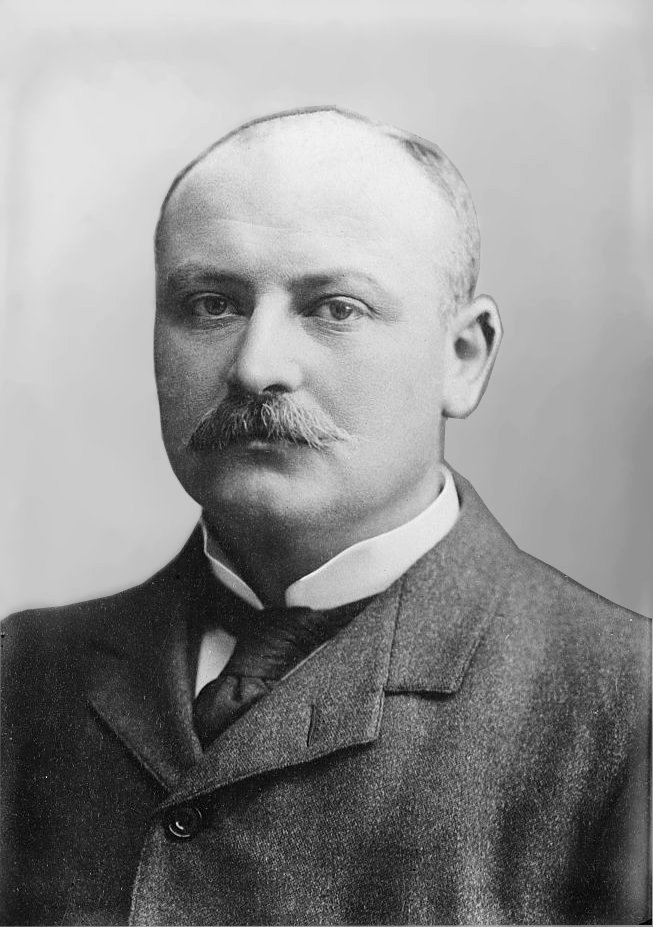
William Fife III

== Other information ==
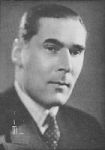
Joop Carp

During the Sailing regattas at the 1924 Summer Olympics among others the following persons were competing in the various classes:

- Eugen Lunde (NOR) – Gold medalist
- Joop Carp (NED)
- Léon Huybrechts (BEL)
