= Arvid Östman =

Swedish wrestler

- Born: 31 August 1902; Kolsva, Sweden
- Died: 2 March 1984 (aged 81); Bålsta, Sweden

Arvid Herman Östman (31 August 1902 – 2 March 1984) was a Swedish wrestler. He competed in the Greco-Roman bantamweight at the 1924 Summer Olympics.

Östman was born in Kolsva and died in Bålsta.

He represented Djurgårdens IF. He won the 1926 Swedish championship in Greco-Roman bantamweight for Djurgårdens IF.
