= Massola =

Massola is a surname. Notable people with the surname include:

- Aldo Massola (1910–1975), Italian-Australian anthropologist and museum curator
- Cencio Massola (1885–1944), Italian sailor
- James Massola, Australian journalist and author
