= Pierre Gauthier (disambiguation) =

Pierre Gauthier (born 1953) is an ice hockey executive.

Pierre Gauthier may also refer to:

- Pierre Gauthier (sailor) (1879–?), French sailor
- Pierre Gauthier (politician) (1894–1972), Liberal party and a Bloc populaire member of the Canadian House of Commons
