= 2022 Women's T20I Nordic Cup =

International cricket tournament

2022 Women's Nordic Cup
- Date: 27–29 May 2022
- Location: Sweden
- Result: Sweden won the series
Teams
Denmark	Norway	Sweden
Captains
Tine Erichsen	Mutaiba Ansar	Gunjan Shukla
Most runs
Tine Erichsen (43)	Ayesha Hasan (66)	Kanchan Rana (110)
Most wickets
Tine Erichsen (3)	Paridhi Agrawal (2); Farial Zia Safdar (2)	Gunjan Shukla (9)

The 2022 Women's T20I Nordic Cup was a Twenty20 International (T20I) cricket tournament that was held in Kolsva, Sweden, from 27 to 29 May 2022. The participants were the hosts Sweden, along with Denmark and Norway- with Denmark playing their first official women's T20I matches. On the penultimate day of the tournament, Sweden won the Nordic Cup, after they beat Denmark by 71 runs and Norway won their match, also against Denmark, by 34 runs.

== Squads ==
Denmark	Norway	Sweden
Tine Erichsen (c); Ane Andersen; Sigrid Buchwaldt; Luise Christensen; Nita Dalgaard; Divya Golechha; Natasha Holmgaard; Maria Karlsen (wk); Annette Lyngby; Kristine Mosumgaard; Ronja Nielsen; Charlotte Pallesen; Sofie Petersen; Anne-Sofie Slebsager	Mutaiba Ansar (c); Pooja Kumari (vc); Paridhi Agrawal; Amna Dastgir; Dulmini Gamage; Anushka Gorad (wk); Ayesha Hasan; Hina Hussain; Misbah Ifzal; Ramya Immadi; Prachi Kumari; Kristina Pirtskhalava; Farima Safi; Farial Zia Safdar	Gunjan Shukla (c); Kanchan Rana (vc); Meghana Alugunoolla (wk); Eman Asim; Sofie Elmesioo; Daisy Holm; Neeha Kayani; Sienna Linden; Signe Lundell (wk); Surya Ravuri; Abhilasha Singh; Rashmi Somashekhar; Anya Vaidya; Tzoulietta Zilfidou

== Points Table ==
Pos	Team	Pld	W	L	NR	Pts	NRR
1	Sweden	5	5	0	0	10	3.341
2	Norway	4	1	3	0	2	−2.594
3	Denmark	3	0	3	0	0	−2.350

Source: ESPNcricinfo

== Fixtures ==
27 May 2022
10:00
Scorecard

Norway; 76/9 (20 overs)	v	Sweden; 77/2 (8.1 overs)
Ayesha Hasan 23 (51); Gunjan Shukla 2/7 (4 overs)		Abhilasha Singh 22* (21); Paridhi Agrawal 1/6 (1 over)

Sweden won by 8 wickets
Guttsta Wicked Cricket Ground, Kolsva
Umpires: Anukool Korde (Swe) and Vinayak Korde (Swe)
Player of the match: Gunjan Shukla (Swe)

- Norway won the toss and elected to bat.
- Daisy Holm, Kanchan Rana, Surya Ravuri, Anya Vaidya (Swe), Paridhi Agrawal and Kristina Pirtskhalava (Nor) all made their T20I debuts.

27 May 2022
14:00
Scorecard

Norway; 64/7 (20 overs)	v	Sweden; 66/1 (9 overs)
Farial Zia Safdar 11 (30); Sofie Elmesioo 2/1 (1 over)		Kanchan Rana 27* (28); Paridhi Agrawal 1/8 (1 over)

Sweden won by 9 wickets
Guttsta Wicked Cricket Ground, Kolsva
Umpires: Anukool Korde (Swe) and Vinayak Korde (Swe)
Player of the match: Gunjan Shukla (Swe)

- Norway won the toss and elected to bat.
- Eman Asim (Swe) and Farima Safi (Nor) both made their T20I debuts.

28 May 2022
10:00
Scorecard

Sweden; 159/5 (20 overs)	v	Denmark; 88 (16.5 overs)
Abhilasha Singh 43 (43); Tine Erichsen 3/41 (4 overs)		Nita Dalgaard 20 (23); Gunjan Shukla 4/20 (3.5 overs)

Sweden won by 71 runs
Guttsta Wicked Cricket Ground, Kolsva
Umpires: Balamurali Moni (Swe) and Suchi Siwach (Swe)
Player of the match: Gunjan Shukla (Swe)

- Sweden won the toss and elected to bat.
- Ane Andersen, Sigrid Buchwaldt, Luise Christensen, Nita Dalgaard, Tine Erichsen, Divya Golechha, Maria Karlsen, Annette Lyngby, Ronja Nielsen, Sofie Petersen and Anne-Sofie Slebsager (Den) all made their T20I debuts.

28 May 2022
14:00
Scorecard

Norway; 112/1 (15 overs)	v	Denmark; 78/4 (15 overs)
Ayesha Hasan 33* (50)		Tine Erichsen 21 (25); Hina Hussain 1/7 (1 over)

Norway won by 34 runs
Guttsta Wicked Cricket Ground, Kolsva
Umpires: Balamurali Moni (Swe) and Suchi Siwach (Swe)
Player of the match: Ayesha Hasan (Nor)

- Denmark won the toss and elected to field.
- The match was reduced to 15 overs per side due to rain.
- Natasha Holmgaard, Kristine Mosumgaard, Charlotte Pallesen (Den) and Misbah Ifzal (Nor) all made their T20I debuts.

29 May 2022
09:00
Scorecard

Denmark; 88/9 (20 overs)	v	Sweden; 89/5 (16.4 overs)
Tine Erichsen 12 (16); Sofie Elmesioo 4/20 (4 overs)		Tzoulietta Zilfidou 24* (27); Luise Christensen 2/25 (4 overs)

Sweden won by 5 wickets
Guttsta Wicked Cricket Ground, Kolsva
Umpires: Bharnidar Kasthurirangan (Swe) and Balamurali Moni (Swe)
Player of the match: Sofie Elmesioo (Swe)

- Denmark won the toss and elected to bat.

29 May 2022
13:00
Scorecard

Norway; 77/9 (20 overs)	v	Sweden; 78/1 (10.4 overs)
Ramya Immadi 15* (51); Rashmi Somashekhar 2/9 (3 overs)		Kanchan Rana 34* (30)

Sweden won by 9 wickets
Guttsta Wicked Cricket Ground, Kolsva
Umpires: Bharnidar Kasthurirangan (Swe) and Balamurali Moni (Swe)
Player of the match: Rashmi Somashekhar (Swe)

- Norway won the toss and elected to bat.
