= Pierre Slock =

Belgian wrestler

- Born: 1903

Pierre Slock (9 November 1896 – 28 January 1943) was a Belgian wrestler. He competed in the Greco-Roman bantamweight at the 1924 Summer Olympics.
