= Keita Meretana =

New Zealand professional wrestler (born 1933)

Keith Meretana
Personal information
- Born: Keith Mildon; 1933 (age 92–93) New Zealand

Professional wrestling career
- Trained by: Anton Koolmann
- Debut: 1951
- Retired: unknown

Keith Mildon (born 1933), also known by his ring name Keita Meretana, is a former professional wrestler and heavyweight wrestling champion of New Zealand from Wairoa, New Zealand.

== Professional wrestling career ==
Mildon, third son of L. W. Mildon and C. Mildon of Wairoa and nephew of Ike Robin, the first professional wrestling champion of New Zealand, began wrestling in 1951. He studying wrestling with Anton Koolmann in Wellington and for eight years wrestled mainly in the East Coast, Bay of Plenty, Hawke's Bay and Wellington areas. In 1952, he was awarded the trophy for the most scientific wrestler in Gisborne.

In May 1959, at the age 26 with weights 16 stone 6 lbs, he turned professional and made his debut with two bouts against the Australian, Ricky Wallace, wrestling a draw with him at Hāwera on 30 May and defeated him on Queen's Birthday weekend in Auckland. Afterwards, he met the team which visited New Zealand, led by Jack Bence (United States), André Drapp (France), Braka Cortez (Brazil) and several others.

On 3 October 1959, he defeated Lofty Binnie and won the NWA New Zealand Heavyweight Championship.

== Championships and accomplishments ==
- NWA New Zealand
  - NWA New Zealand Heavyweight Championship (1 time)
