= Jan Bozděch =

Czech wrestler

- Born: 10 March 1905; Prague, Austria-Hungary

Jan Bozděch (born 10 March 1905, date of death unknown) was a Czech wrestler. He competed in the Greco-Roman bantamweight at the 1924 Summer Olympics.
