= Magnus Hellström =

Swedish sailor

Personal information
- Nationality: Swedish
- Born: 3 November 1900; Gothenburg
- Died: 29 April 1980 (aged 79); Stockholm

Sailing career
- Class: 6 Metre
- Club: Royal Swedish Yacht Club
- Updated on 6 March 2015

Magnus Hellström (3 November 1900 – 29 April 1980) was a sailor from Sweden, who represented his country at the 1924 Summer Olympics in Le Havre, France.

== Bibliography ==
- "Magnus Hellström Bio, Stats, and Results". Olympic Sports. Sports Reference. Archived from the original on 17 December 2012.
- Les Jeux de la VIIIe Olympiade Paris 1924:rapport official (PDF) (in French). Paris: Librairie de France: Comité Olympique Français. 1924. Archived from the original (PDF) on 21 April 2013.
