= Rolando Aguirre =

Argentine sailor

Personal information
- Full name: Rolando Julián Aguirre Barreyro
- Born: 28 January 1904 Buenos Aires, Argentina
- Died: 16 August 1994 (aged 90)

Sport

Sailing career
- Class: 8 Metre
- Updated on 8 March 2015

Rolando Julián Aguirre Barreyro (28 January 1904 – 16 August 1994) was a sailor from Argentina, who represented his country at the 1924 Summer Olympics in Le Havre, France.

== Sources ==
- "Rolando Aguirre Bio, Stats, and Results". Olympic Sports. Sports-Reference.com. Archived from the original on 18 April 2020.
- Les Jeux de la VIIIe Olympiade Paris 1924:rapport official (PDF) (in French). Paris: Librairie de France: Comité Olympique Français. 1924.
