= Mazhar Çakin =

Turkish wrestler

- Born: 1907

Mazhar Çakin (born 1907, date of death unknown) was a Turkish wrestler. He competed in the Greco-Roman bantamweight at the 1924 Summer Olympics.
