= Victor Vanderslyen =

Belgian sailor

Personal information
- Nationality: Antrwerpen, Belgian
- Born: 7 March 1904 Anvers
- Died: 16 July 1937 (aged 33) Quijorna, Spain

Sailing career
- Sport: Sailing
- Class: 8 Metre
Competition record
Sailing
Representing Belgium
Olympic Games
4th	1924 Le Havre	8 Metre
- Updated on 8 March 2015

Victor Vanderslyen (7 March 1904 – 16 July 1937) was a sailor from Belgium, who represented his country at the 1924 Summer Olympics in Le Havre, France.

== Sources ==
- "Victor Vandersleyen Bio, Stats, and Results". Olympic Sports. Sports-Reference.com. Archived from the original on 18 April 2020.
- Les Jeux de la VIIIe Olympiade Paris 1924:rapport official (PDF) (in French). Paris: Librairie de France: Comité Olympique Français. 1924. Archived from the original (PDF) on 21 April 2013.
