= Vilhelm Vett =

Danish sailor

Personal information
- Nickname: William
- Nationality: Danish
- Born: 31 December 1879 Copenhagen, Denmark
- Died: 3 December 1962 (aged 82) Palma de Mallorca, Spain

Sailing career
- Sport: Sailing
- Club: Royal Danish Yacht Club
- Class: 6 Metre
Medal record
Sailing
Representing Denmark
Olympic Games
Silver medal – second place	1924 Paris	6 metre class
Silver medal – second place	1928 Amsterdam	6 metre class

Vilhelm Vett (31 December 1879 – 3 December 1962) was a Danish sailor who competed in the 1924 Summer Olympics and in the 1928 Summer Olympics. In 1924 he won the silver medal as crew member of the Danish boat Bonzo in the 6 metre class event. Four years later he won his second silver medal, this time as part of the Danish boat Hi-Hi in the 6 metre class competition.
