= Paul Van Halteren =

Belgian sailor

Personal information
- Nationality: Belgian
- Born: 23 July 1898
- Died: 4 January 1949

Sailing career
- Class: 8 Metre
- Updated on 8 March 2015

Paul Van Halteren (23 July 1898 – 4 January 1949) was a sailor from Belgium, who represented his country at the 1924 Summer Olympics in Le Havre, France.

== Sources ==
- "Paul Van Halteren Bio, Stats, and Results". Olympic Sports. Sports-Reference.com. Archived from the original on 18 April 2020.
- Les Jeux de la VIIIe Olympiade Paris 1924:rapport official (PDF) (in French). Paris: Librairie de France: Comité Olympique Français. 1924. Archived from the original (PDF) on 21 April 2013.
