= Georg Gundersen =

Danish wrestler

- Born: 28 March 1897; Aalborg, Denmark
- Died: 31 December 1970 (aged 73); Aalborg, Denmark

Georg Gundersen (28 March 1897 – 31 December 1970) was a Danish wrestler. He competed in the Greco-Roman bantamweight at the 1924 Summer Olympics.
