= Guy Herpin =

French sailor

Personal information
- Nationality: French
- Born: 20 April 1899
- Died: 23 March 1968 (aged 68)

Sailing career
- Class: 6 Metre
- Club: Cercle de la Voile d'Arcachon, Arcachon (FRA)

Guy Herpin (20 April 1899 – 23 March 1968) was a sailor from France, who represented his country at the 1924 Summer Olympics in Le Havre, France.

== Sources ==
- Evans, Hilary; Gjerde, Arild; Heijmans, Jeroen; Mallon, Bill; et al. "Georges Herpin Bio, Stats, and Results". Olympics at Sports-Reference.com. Sports Reference LLC. Archived from the original on 2 April 2015.
- Les Jeux de la VIIIe Olympiade Paris 1924:rapport official (PDF) (in French). Paris: Librairie de France: Comité Olympique Français. 1924. Archived from the original (PDF) on 21 April 2013.
