= Einar Pettersen =

Norwegian wrestler

Personal information
- Born: 23 June 1897 Sarpsborg, Norway
- Died: 23 March 1966 (aged 68) Sarpsborg

Sport
- Sport: Wrestling
- Club: TIL National
Medal record
Men's wrestling
Representing Norway
World Championships
Bronze medal – third place	1922 Stockholm	Middleweight 75 kg

Einar Pettersen (23 June 1897 – 23 March 1966) was a Norwegian sport wrestler.

Born in Sarpsborg on 23 June 1897, Pettersen represented the club TIL National. He won a silver medal at the 1922 World Wrestling Championships. He was awarded the King's Cup at the national championships in 1927.

Pettersen died in Sarpsborg on 23 March 1966, aged 68.
