= Gordon Fowler =

British sailor

Personal information
- Full name: Harold Gordon Fowler
- Nationality: British
- Born: 4 January 1899 Donington
- Died: 30 June 1975 (aged 76) Aldershot

Sport

Sailing career
- Class(es): 12' Dinghy; French National Monotype 1924; 8 Metre
Medal record
Sailing
Representing United Kingdom
Olympic Games
Silver medal – second place	1924 Le Havre	8 Metre

Harold Gordon Fowler (4 January 1899 – 30 June 1975) was a sailor from Great Britain, who represented his country at the 1924 Summer Olympics in Meulan and Le Havre, France. Fowler took the silver in the 8 Metre and 7th in the Monotype. He also competed at the 1928 Summer Olympics in Amsterdam, Netherlands, where he became 8th in the 1928 competition.

== Sources ==
- "Gordon Fowler Bio, Stats, and Results". Olympic Sports. Sports-Reference.com. Archived from the original on 2 April 2015.
