= TIL National =

Norwegian sports club

Logo.

Turn- og Idrettslaget National is a Norwegian sports club from Sarpsborg, Østfold. It has sections for figure skating, sport wrestling and weightlifting.

The club was founded on 30 November 1905. As the name indicates, gymnastics and athletics were among its first sports, together with boxing, wrestling, skating and later team handball.

Skilled wrestlers include world championship runner-up Einar Pettersen, European champion Sven Martinsen and Nordic champion Walfred Solberg. Well-known athletes include Olympians Rolf Hansen and Reidar Sørlie. Olympic medalists in gymnastics include Jørgen Andersen, Arthur Rydstrøm, Oscar Olstad, Petter Martinsen, and Asbjørn Bodahl.
