= Rolf Hansen (athlete) =

Norwegian long-distance runner

Personal information
- Nationality: Norwegian
- Born: 9 October 1906 Sarpsborg
- Died: 9 May 1980 (aged 73) Sarpsborg

Sport
- Sport: Track and field
- Event: 5,000 metres

Achievements and titles
- Personal best: 14.48,0 (1936)

Rolf Hansen (9 October 1906 – 9 May 1980) was a Norwegian long-distance runner who specialized in the 5000 metres.

At the 1936 Summer Olympics he finished ninth in the 5000 metres final in 14:48.0 minutes. This was his career best time. He became Norwegian 5000 metres champion in 1935 and 1936, and 10,000 metres champion in 1936. In the 5000 metres he also won the bronze in 1933 and silver in 1937. He represented the club TIL National. His personal best in the 10,000 metres was 31:22.8 minutes (1936), and his 3000 metres best was 8:35.4 minutes (1935).
