= Roberto Moscatelli =

Italian sailor

Personal information
- Nationality: Italian
- Born: 30 May 1895 Genoa, Italy
- Died: 15 September 1980 (aged 85)

Sailing career
- Sport: Sailing
- Club: Yacht Club Italiano, Genova (ITA)
- Class: 6 Metre
Competition record
Sailing
Representing Sweden
Olympic Games
1924 Le Havre	6 Metre
- Updated on 6 March 2015

Roberto Moscatelli (30 May 1895 – 15 September 1980) was a sailor from Italy, who represented his country at the 1924 Summer Olympics in Le Havre, France.

== Sources ==
- "Roberto Moscatelli Bio, Stats, and Results". Olympic Sports. Sports-Reference.com. Archived from the original on 18 April 2020.
- Les Jeux de la VIIIe Olympiade Paris 1924:rapport official (PDF) (in French). Paris: Librairie de France: Comité Olympique Français. 1924. Archived from the original (PDF) on 21 April 2013.
