= Mario Uriburu =

Argentine sailor

Mario Roberto Uriburu Peró (Bobby Uriburu)
Personal information
- Full name: Mario Roberto Uriburu Peró
- Nationality: Argentine
- Born: 8 August 1901
- Died: 9 August 1984 (aged 83) San Francisco, California

Sailing career
- Sport: Sailing
- Class: 8 Metre
Competition record
Sailing
Representing Argentina
Olympic Games
| 5th | 1924 Le Havre | 8 Metre |
- Updated on 8 March 2015

Mario Roberto Uriburu Peró was a sailor from Argentina, known as "Bobby", who represented his country at the 1924 Summer Olympics in Le Havre, France.

== Sources ==
- "Roberto Uriburu - Bio, Stats, and Results". Olympic Sports. Sports-Reference.com. Archived from the original on 18 April 2020.
- Les Jeux de la VIIIe Olympiade Paris 1924:rapport official (PDF) (in French). Paris: Librairie de France: Comité Olympique Français. 1924. Archived from the original (PDF) on 21 April 2013.
- "Mario Roberto Bobby Uriburu - Bio, Stats, and Results". Sailing. 1947 Blue Water Medal.
- "Mario Roberto "Bobby" Uriburu". Sailing. El Gaucho.
- "Yacht Club Argentino (YCA) Gaucho". Sailing. El Gaucho.
