= Knud Degn =

Danish sailor (1880–1965)

Personal information
- Full name: Knud Oluf Jessen Degn
- Nationality: Danish
- Born: 11 May 1880 Esbønderup, Gribskov, Denmark
- Died: 16 May 1965 (aged 85) Copenhagen, Denmark

Sailing career
- Sport: Sailing
- Club: Royal Danish Yacht Club
- Class: 6 Metre
Medal record
Sailing
Representing Denmark
Olympic Games
Silver medal – second place	1924 Paris	6 metre class

Knud Oluf Jessen Degn (11 May 1880 – 16 May 1965) was a Danish sailor who competed in the 1924 Summer Olympics. In 1924 he won the silver medal as crew member of the Danish boat Bonzo in the 6 metre class event.
