= Adolf Herschmann =

Austrian wrestler

- Born: 6 April 1895

Adolf Herschmann (born 6 April 1895, date of death unknown) was an Austrian wrestler. He competed in the Greco-Roman bantamweight at the 1924 Summer Olympics.
