= Nils Rinman =

Swedish sailor

Personal information
- Full name: Nils Fredrik Rinman
- Nationality: Swedish
- Born: 28 November 1880 Stockholm
- Died: 19 October 1939 (aged 58) Stockholm

Sailing career
- Sport: Sailing
- Club: Royal Swedish Yacht Club
- Class: 6 Metre
- Updated on 6 March 2015

Nils Fredrik Rinman (28 November 1880 – 19 October 1939) was a sailor from Sweden, who represented his country at the 1924 Summer Olympics in Le Havre, France.

== Sources ==
- "Nils Rinman Bio, Stats, and Results". Olympic Sports. Sports-Reference.com. Archived from the original on 17 April 2020.
- Les Jeux de la VIIIe Olympiade Paris 1924:rapport official (PDF) (in French). Paris: Librairie de France: Comité Olympique Français. 1924. Archived from the original (PDF) on 21 April 2013.
