= József Tasnádi =

Hungarian wrestler (1903–1977)

- Born: 10 October 1903; Tolna, Hungary
- Died: 6 July 1977 (aged 73); Bogotá, Colombia

József Tasnádi (10 October 1903 – 6 July 1977) was a Hungarian wrestler. He competed in the Greco-Roman bantamweight at the 1924 Summer Olympics. Four years later, he won a gold medal at the 1930 European Wrestling Championships.
