= Pedro Pi =

Spanish sailor

Personal information
- Full name: Pere Pi i Castelló
- Nationality: Spanish
- Born: Pedro Pi Castelló; 14 September 1899 Barcelona, Spain
- Died: 3 January 1970 (aged 70) Barcelona, Spain

Sailing career
- Sport: Sailing
- Club: Real Club Marítimo de Barcelona
- Class: 6 Metre

Pedro Pi (14 September 1899 – 3 January 1970) was a sailor from Spain, who represented his country at the 1924 Summer Olympics in Le Havre, France.

== Sources ==
- "Pedro Pi Bio, Stats, and Results". Olympic Sports. Sports-Reference.com. Archived from the original on 18 April 2020.
- Les Jeux de la VIIIe Olympiade Paris 1924:rapport official (PDF) (in French). Paris: Librairie de France: Comité Olympique Français. 1924. Archived from the original (PDF) on 21 April 2013.
