= César Gérico =

Argentine sailor

Personal information
- Full name: César Jorge Gérico
- Nationality: Argentine
- Born: 1901
- Died: unknown

Sport

Sailing career
- Class: 8 Metre
Competition record
Sailing
Representing Argentina
Olympic Games
5th	1924 Le Havre	8 Metre
- Updated on 8 March 2015

César Jorge Gérico (1901 – unknown) was a sailor from Argentina, who represented his country at the 1924 Summer Olympics in Le Havre, France.

== Sources ==
- "César Gérico Bio, Stats, and Results". Olympic Sports. Sports-Reference.com. Archived from the original on 18 April 2020.
- Les Jeux de la VIIIe Olympiade Paris 1924:rapport official (PDF) (in French). Paris: Librairie de France: Comité Olympique Français. 1924. Archived from the original (PDF) on 21 April 2013.
