= Christian Nielsen (Danish sailor) =

Danish sailor

Personal information
- Full name: Christian Søren Nielsen
- Nationality: Danish
- Born: 7 April 1873 Copenhagen, Denmark
- Died: 7 November 1952 (aged 79) Copenhagen, Denmark

Sailing career
- Sport: Sailing
- Club: Royal Danish Yacht Club
- Class: 6 Metre
Medal record
Sailing
Representing Denmark
Olympic Games
Silver medal – second place	1924 Paris	6 metre class

Christian Søren Nielsen (7 April 1873 – 7 November 1952) was a Danish sailor who competed in the 1924 Summer Olympics. In 1924 he won the silver medal as crew member of the Danish boat Bonzo in the 6 metre class event.
