= Honoré Louit =

French sailor

Personal information
- Nationality: French
- Born: 16 January 1900
- Died: 29 April 1981 (aged 81)

Sailing career
- Class: 6 Metre
- Club: Cercle de la Voile d'Arcachon, Arcachon (FRA)

Honoré Louit (16 January 1900 – 29 April 1981) was a sailor from France, who represented his country at the 1924 Summer Olympics in Le Havre, France.

== Sources ==
- "Henri Louit Bio, Stats, and Results". Olympic Sports. Sports-Reference.com. Archived from the original on 1 October 2015.
- Les Jeux de la VIIIe Olympiade Paris 1924:rapport official (PDF) (in French). Paris: Librairie de France: Comité Olympique Français. 1924. Archived from the original (PDF) on 21 April 2013.
