= Ivar Widner =

Swedish military music composer (1891–1973)

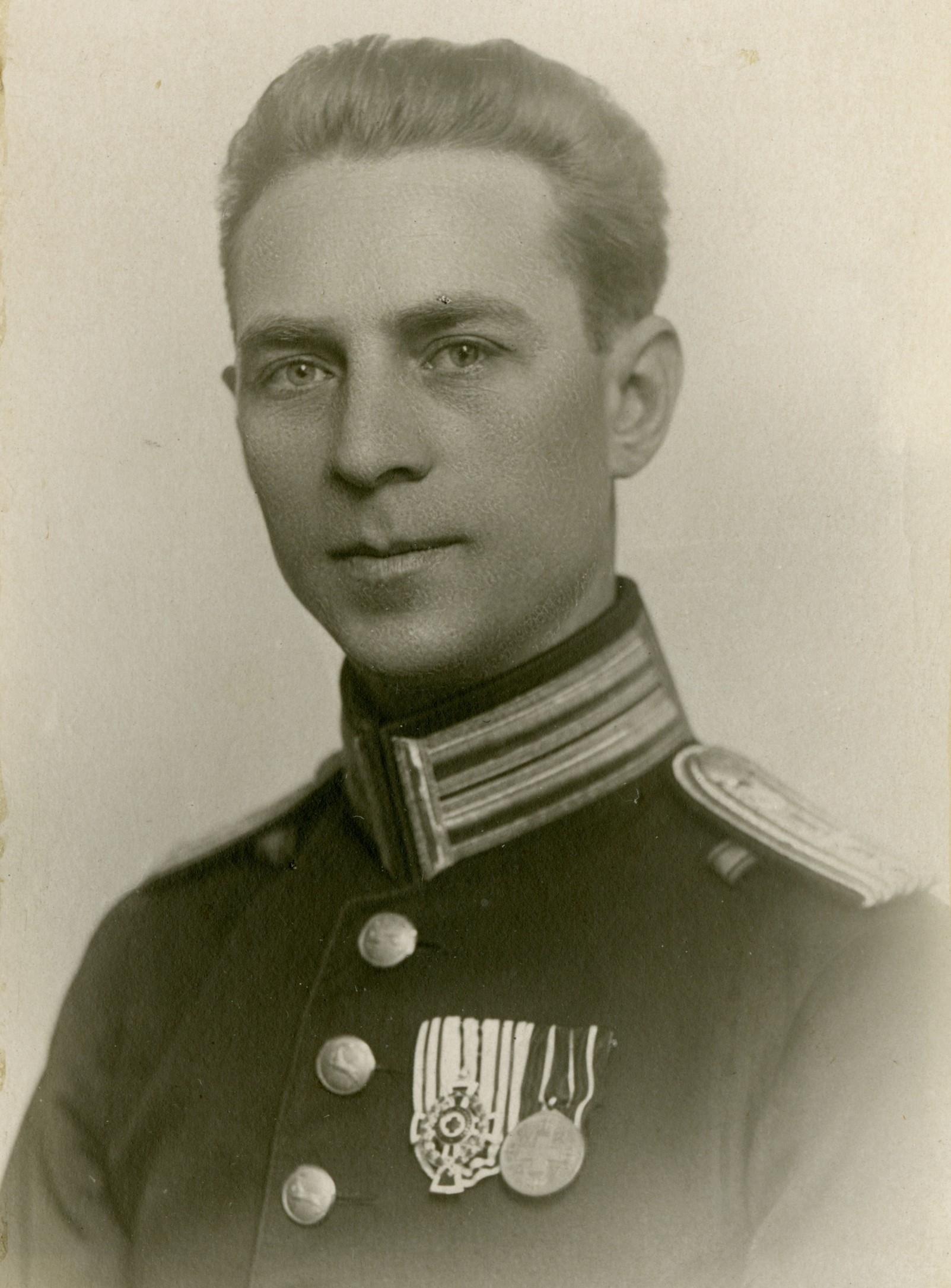
Ivar Widner

Ivar Widner (born Pettersson; 29 December 1891 – 26 August 1973) was a Swedish composer, mainly of military music.

Widner was born in Kolsva in Västmanland County. He entered the Västmanland Regiment in 1905 as a drummer, and would stay in the regiment until 1916. While still employed by the regiment, he studied music at the Royal College of Music in Stockholm 1909–1915. In 1916 he was transferred to the Norrbotten Regiment and took up position as its musical director. He stayed there until 1923, when he was transferred to the Hälsinge Regiment and took up the position of musical director of his new regiment. He was promoted to the rank of Captain in 1931. In 1932 he moved to Stockholm and served as head of the naval band of the Stockholm station (later merged with the naval band of Karlskrona station to form the Royal Swedish Navy Band). He retired in 1947. Aside from his professional career, he was also engaged in volunteer orchestras and choral societies. He composed around 135 works, including about 30 military marches. He was a member of the Royal Swedish Academy of Music.

Compositions

- Arosmarch - Västerås Stads marsch antagen 1997
- Med Landstormen
- Vår Flotta (Militärmarsch)
- Svensk Signalmarsch Nr 1
- Svensk Signalmarsch Nr 2
- Narviksgutten
- 11. Infanteribrigaden - Till Överste Gösta Lilliehöök
- Infanterimarsch
- Flygarmarsch
- Käcka gossar
- Festspel
- Överste Stålhane - Till Överste Henning Stålhane, Överste Hälsinge Regement 1923-1932
- Hälsingen
- Födelsedagsmarsch
- Pionjärmarsch
- Stockholmpojkarnas Marsch
- Efter drabbningen
- Tappra grenadjärer
- Subalternen
- Kronfänriken
- Bröllopsmarsch (Kronprinsessan Ingrids Bröllopsmarsch)
- Kämpavisa
- Örlogsmarsch
- Hälsingefärger
- Festfanfar för Harmonieorkester
- Under Tretungad Flagg
- Bergensgutterne
- Skansenpojkarna
- Marche Boulouge
- Sedvanliga Fanfaren
- Citymarsch till Farsta
- Tre Kronor
- Klubb 19
- Kungamarschen
- Drotthornet
- Malärdrottningen
- Flaggmarsch (Militärmusiksamfundets Paradmarsch)
