= Olle Rinman =

Swedish sailor

Personal information
- Full name: Olle Fredrik Alexander Rinman
- Nationality: Swedish
- Born: 30 March 1908 Stockholm, Sweden
- Died: 28 May 1985 (aged 77) Lidingö, Sweden

Sailing career
- Sport: Sailing
- Club: Royal Swedish Yacht Club
- Class: 6 Metre
- Updated on 6 March 2015

Olle Fredrik Alexander Rinman (30 March 1908 – 28 May 1985) was a sailor from Sweden, who represented his country at the 1924 Summer Olympics in Le Havre, France.

== Sources ==
- "Olle Rinman Bio, Stats, and Results". Olympic Sports. Sports-Reference.com. Archived from the original on 17 April 2020.
- Les Jeux de la VIIIe Olympiade Paris 1924:rapport official (PDF) (in French). Paris: Librairie de France: Comité Olympique Français. 1924. Archived from the original (PDF) on 21 April 2013.
