= Edmond Moussié =

French sailor

Personal information
- Full name: Michel Edmond Moussié
- Born: 26 March 1888 Bordeaux, France
- Died: 8 October 1933 (aged 45) Paris, France

Sport

Sailing career
- Class: 6 Metre
- Club: Cercle de la Voile d'Arcachon, Arcachon (FRA)

Michel Edmond Moussié (26 March 1888 – 8 October 1933) was a sailor from France, who represented his country at the 1924 Summer Olympics in Le Havre, France.

== Sources ==
- "Edmond Moussié Bio, Stats, and Results". Olympic Sports. Sports-Reference.com. Archived from the original on 17 April 2020.
- Les Jeux de la VIIIe Olympiade Paris 1924:rapport official (PDF) (in French). Paris: Librairie de France: Comité Olympique Français. 1924. Archived from the original (PDF) on 21 April 2013.
