= Antonín Skopový =

Czech wrestler

- Born: 20 June 1903

Antonín Skopový (born 20 June 1903, date of death unknown) was a Czech wrestler. He competed in the Greco-Roman bantamweight at the 1924 Summer Olympics.
