= Carlo Ponte =

Italian wrestler (1890–1960)

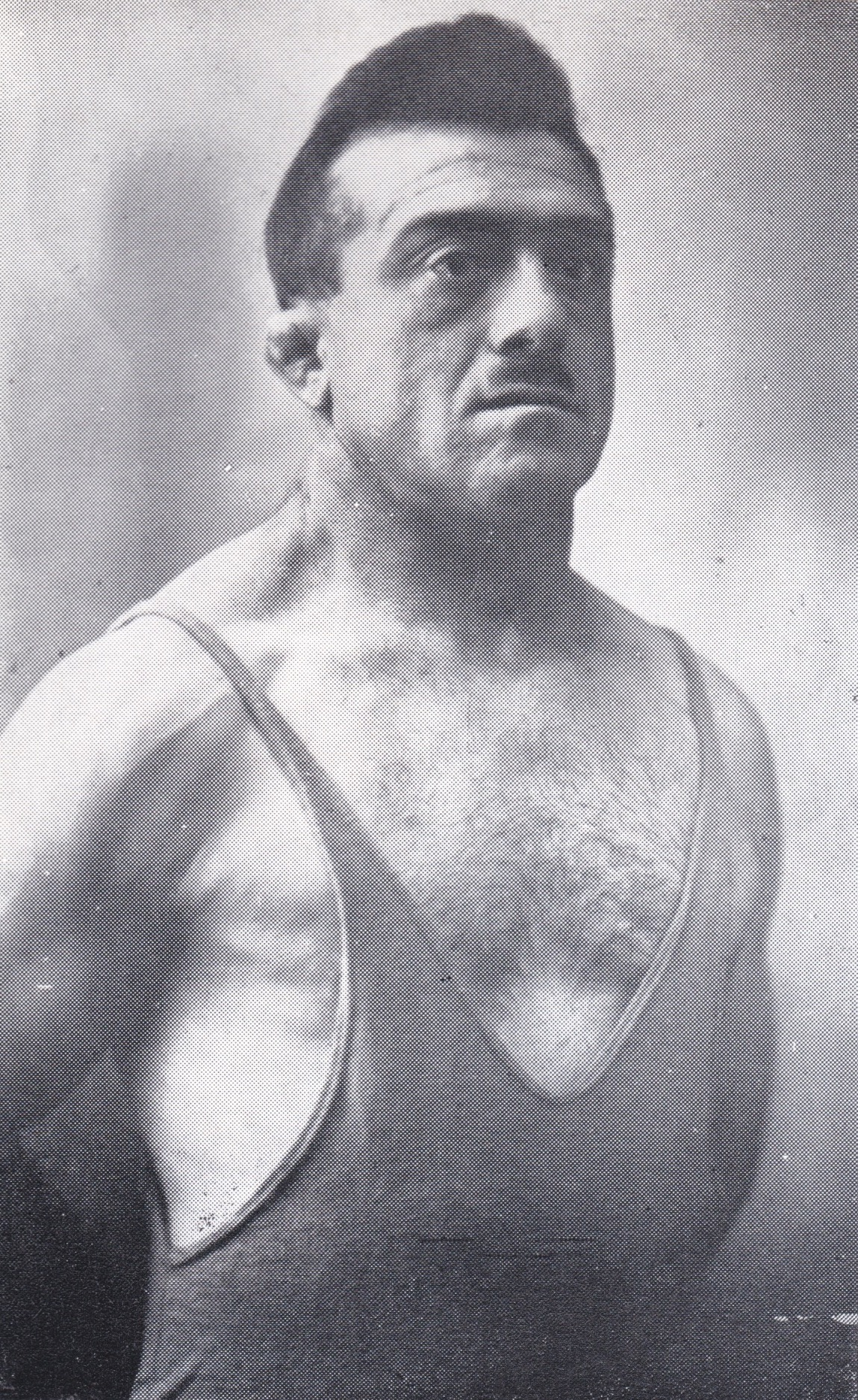
- Born: 3 May 1890; Genoa, Italy
- Died: 28 February 1960 (aged 69)

Carlo Ponte (3 May 1890 – 28 February 1960) was an Italian wrestler. He competed in the Greco-Roman bantamweight at the 1924 Summer Olympics.
