= Ludvig Larsen =

Norwegian sports shooter (1883–1948)

Personal information
- Born: 10 March 1883 Hamar, Hedmark, Norway
- Died: 31 January 1948 (aged 64) Oslo, Norway

Sport
- Sport: Sports shooting

Ludvig Olav Larsen (10 March 1883 – 31 January 1948) was a Norwegian rifle shooter who competed at the 1924 Summer Olympics in Paris.
