= Georges Mollard =

French sailor

Personal information
- Full name: Georges Henri Joseph Mollard
- Nationality: French
- Born: 25 April 1902 Cannes, France
- Died: 2 November 1986 (aged 84) Cannes, France

Sailing career
- Sport: Sailing
- Club: Société des Régates de Cannes, Cannes (FRA)
- Class: 8 Metre
Medal record
Sailing
Representing France
Olympic Games
Bronze medal – third place	1924 Le Havre	8 Metre
- Updated on 2 March 2015

Georges Henri Joseph Mollard (25 April 1902 – 2 November 1986) was a sailor from France, who represented his country at the 1924 Summer Olympics in Le Havre, France. Mollard took the bronze in the 8 Metre.

== Sources ==
- "Georges Mollard Bio, Stats, and Results". Olympic Sports. Sports-Reference.com. Archived from the original on 2 April 2015.
