= Walter Riggs (sailor) =

British sailor

Personal information
- Nationality: British
- Born: 1 January 1877 Leiston, Suffolk, Great Britain
- Died: 10 November 1951 (aged 74) Blyth, Suffolk, Great Britain

Sailing career
- Sport: Sailing
- Class: 8 Metre
Competition record
Sailing
Representing United Kingdom
Olympic Games
Silver medal – second place	1924 Le Havre	8 Metre
- Updated on 2 March 2015

Walter Riggs (1 January 1877 – 10 November 1951) was a sailor from Great Britain, who represented his country at the 1924 Summer Olympics in Le Havre, France. Riggs took the silver in the 8 Metre.

== Sources ==
- Evans, Hilary; Gjerde, Arild; Heijmans, Jeroen; Mallon, Bill; et al. "Walter Riggs Bio, Stats, and Results". Olympics at Sports-Reference.com. Sports Reference LLC. Archived from the original on 18 April 2020.
