= Robert Girardet =

French sailor

Personal information
- Full name: Robert William Girardet
- Nationality: French
- Born: 11 March 1893 Paris, France
- Died: 1 March 1977 (aged 83) Neuilly-sur-Seine, France

Sport

Sailing career
- Class: 8 Metre
Medal record
Sailing
Representing France
Olympic Games
Bronze medal – third place	1924 Le Havre	8 Metre
- Updated on 2 March 2015

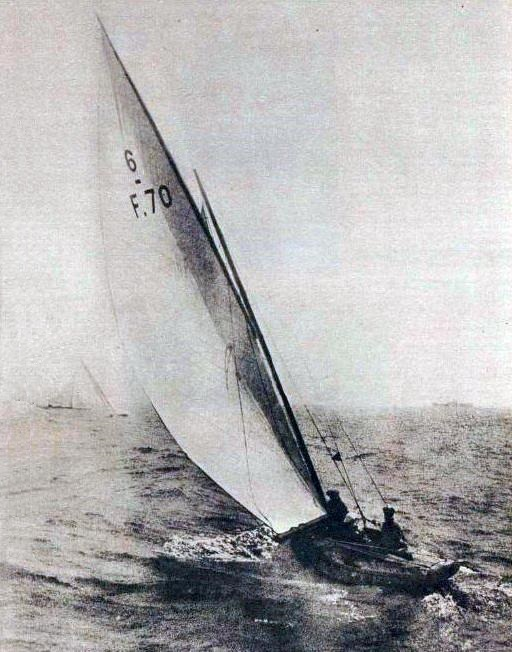
France third of the eight-metre yachts, on 'Namouça', at the 1924 Olympics (Le Havre).

Robert William Girardet (11 March 1893 – 1 March 1977) was a sailor from France, who represented his country at the 1924 Summer Olympics in Le Havre, France. Girardet took the bronze in the 8 Metre.

== Sources ==
- "Robert Girardet Bio, Stats, and Results". Olympic Sports. Sports-Reference.com. Archived from the original on 17 April 2020.
