= Kasispea =

Village in Estonia

Coordinates: 59°36′N 25°46′E

- Village
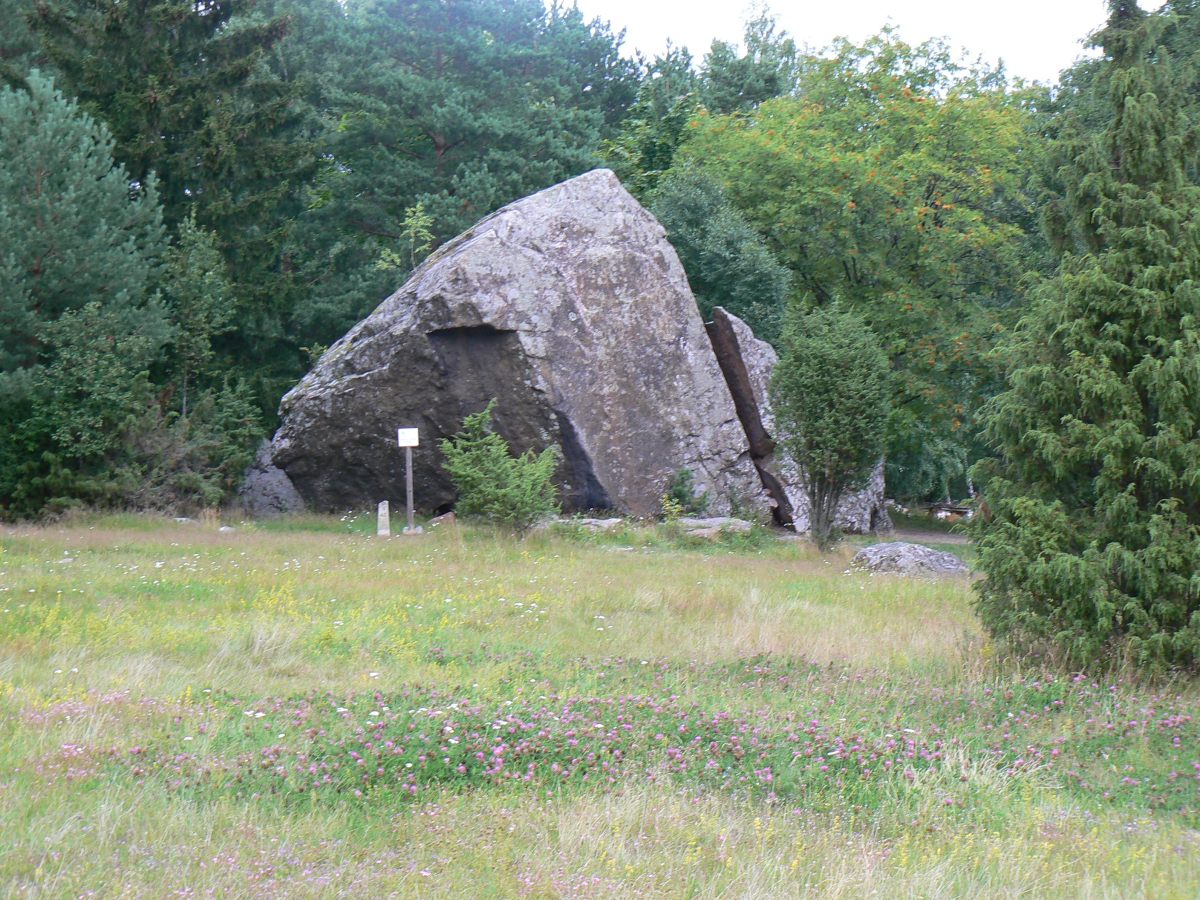
- The Jaani-Tooma suurkivi in Kasispea
- Interactive map of Kasispea
- Country: Estonia
- County: Harju County
- Parish: Kuusalu Parish
- Time zone: UTC+2 (EET)
  - Summer (DST): UTC+3 (EEST)

Kasispea is a village in Kuusalu Parish, Harju County in northern Estonia, on the territory of Lahemaa National Park. It's located on the Pärispea Peninsula.
