= André Guerrier =

French sailor

Personal information
- Full name: André Onésime Gaston Guerrier
- Nationality: French
- Born: 18 December 1874 Le Havre, France

Sport

Sailing career
- Class: 8 Metre
- Club: SNPH, Le Havre (FRA)
Medal record
Sailing
Representing France
Olympic Games
| Bronze medal – third place | 1924 Le Havre | 8 Metre |
- Updated on 2 March 2015

André Onésime Gaston Guerrier (22 October 1874 – 8 December 1948) was a sailor from France, who represented his country at the 1924 Summer Olympics in Le Havre, France. Guerrier took the bronze in the 8 Metre.

== Sources ==
- "André Guerrier Bio, Stats, and Results". Olympic Sports. Sports-Reference.com. Archived from the original on 17 April 2020.
