= Thomas Riggs (sailor) =

British sailor

Personal information
- Full name: Thomas Cooper Riggs
- Nationality: British
- Born: 22 May 1903 Hendon, Greater London, Great Britain
- Died: 5 February 1976 (aged 72) Blyth, Suffolk, Great Britain

Sailing career
- Sport: Sailing
- Class: 8 Metre
Medal record
Sailing
Representing United Kingdom
Olympic Games
| Silver medal – second place | 1924 Le Havre | 8 Metre |

Thomas Cooper Riggs (22 May 1903 – 5 February 1976) was a sailor from Great Britain, who represented his country at the 1924 Summer Olympics in Le Havre, France. Riggs took the silver in the 8 Metre. In the 1928 competition we became 7th.

== Sources ==
- Evans, Hilary; Gjerde, Arild; Heijmans, Jeroen; Mallon, Bill; et al. "Thomas Riggs Bio, Stats, and Results". Olympics at Sports-Reference.com. Sports Reference LLC. Archived from the original on 18 April 2020.
