= Théo Kueny =

French wrestler

- Born: 12 December 1894; Brunstatt, Alsace-Lorraine, France
- Died: 20 May 1978 (aged 83); Sierentz, France

Théo Kueny (12 December 1894 – 20 May 1978) was a French wrestler. He competed in the Greco-Roman bantamweight at the 1924 Summer Olympics.
