= Edwin Jacob =

British sailor

Olympic medal record

Sailing
Silver medal – second place	1924 Paris	8 metre class

Edwin Ellis Jacob (10 April 1878 – 3 December 1964) was a British sailor who competed in the 1924 Summer Olympics. He was born in Kensington. In 1924 he won the silver medal as crew member of the British boat Emily in the 8 metre class event.
