= Cencio Massola =

Italian sailor

Personal information
- Nationality: Italian
- Born: 24 November 1885 Genoa, Italy
- Died: 2 January 1944 (aged 58)

Sailing career
- Sport: Sailing
- Class: 6 Metre
Competition record
Sailing
Representing Italy
Olympic Games
1924 Le Havre	6 Metre
- Updated on 6 March 2015

Cencio Massola (24 November 1885 – 2 January 1944) was a sailor from Italy, who represented his country at the 1924 Summer Olympics in Le Havre, France.

== Sources ==
- "Cencio Massola Bio, Stats, and Results". Olympic Sports. Sports-Reference.com. Archived from the original on 18 April 2020.
- Les Jeux de la VIIIe Olympiade Paris 1924:rapport official (PDF) (in French). Paris: Librairie de France: Comité Olympique Français. 1924. Archived from the original (PDF) on 21 April 2013.
