= Anthonij Guépin =

Dutch sailor (1897–1964)

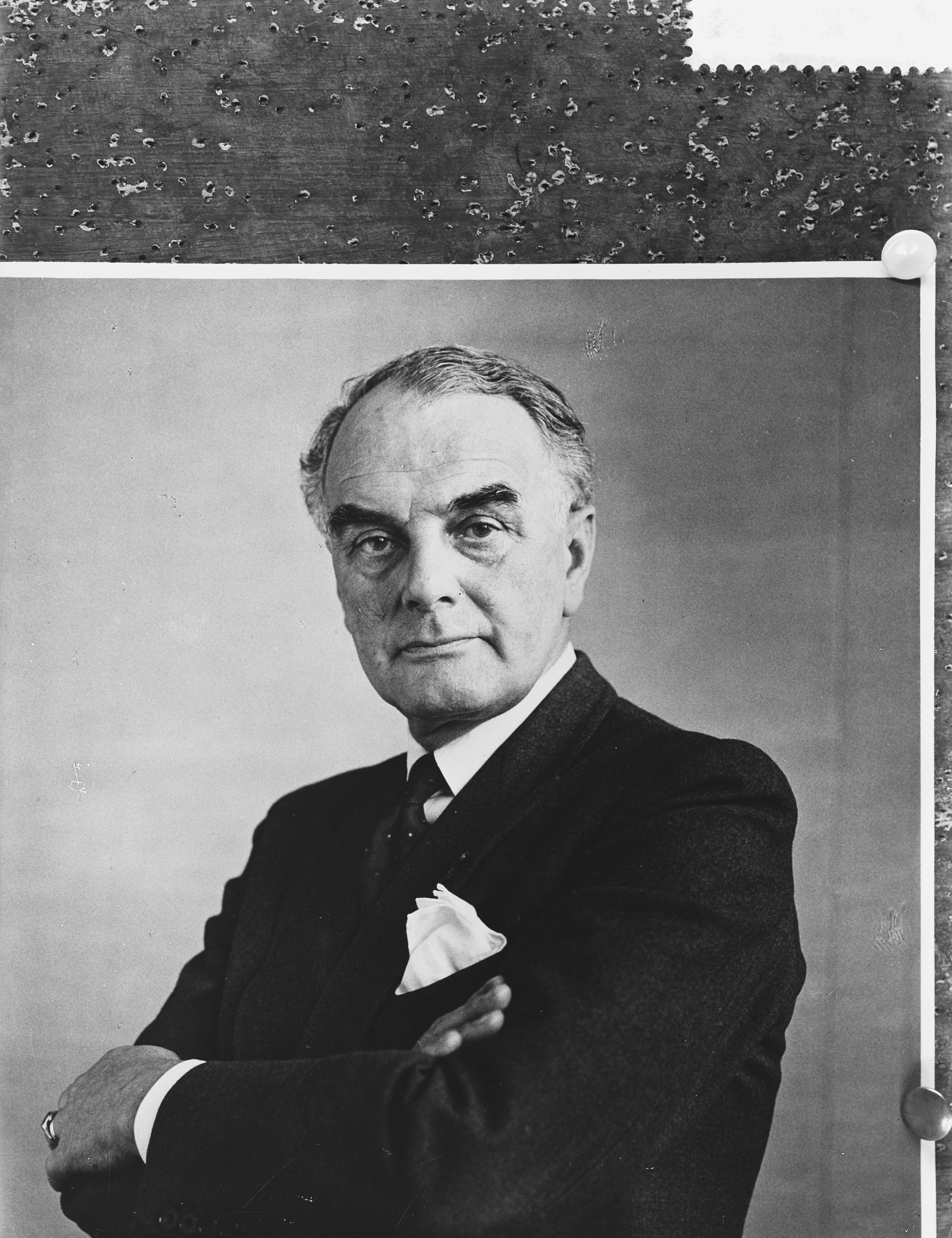

Personal information
- Full name: Anthonij Johannes Guépin
- Nationality: Dutch
- Born: 2 May 1897 Den Helder, Netherlands
- Died: 16 August 1964 (aged 67) Sint-Truiden, Belgium

Sport

Sailing career
- Class: 6 Metre
Medal record
Sailing
Representing Netherlands
Olympic Games
Bronze medal – third place	1924 Paris	6 Metre
- Updated on 2013-12-31

Anthonij Johannes Guépin (2 May 1897 – 16 August 1964) was a sailor from the Netherlands, who represented his native country at the 1924 Summer Olympics in Paris, France. With helmsman Joop Carp and fellow crew member Jan Vreede, crewing the Dutch boat Willem Six, Guépin took the Bronze in the 6 Metre.

== Professional life ==
Anthony Guépin followed Gymnasium and studied law at the Leiden University He became a top manager within Koninklijke Philips N.V. due to his people skills tact and diplomacy.

Guépin started his career by Philips on 15 May 1925 as lawyer in Amsterdam. He was promoted on 19 juni 1939 to secretary of the company and was in charge of the patent department. In 1958 he became vice president.

Even after his retirement Guépin stayed involved by Phillips as member of the board.

== Sources ==
- Evans, Hilary; Gjerde, Arild; Heijmans, Jeroen; Mallon, Bill; et al. "Anthony Guépin". Olympics at Sports-Reference.com. Sports Reference LLC. Archived from the original on 18 April 2020.
- "Economisch-Historisch Jaarboek(1965)" (PDF). Economisch-Historisch Jaarboek (1965). www.iisg.nl/ondernemers.
- "Anthony Guépin Dutch biography". www.ontdekdenhelder.com. Archived from the original on 1 January 2014.
- "Les Jeux de la VIIIe Olympiade Paris 1924:rapport official" (PDF) (in French). Paris: Librairie de France: Comité Olympique Français. 1924. Archived from the original (PDF) on 21 April 2013.
