= Gérardo Apruzzese =

French wrestler

Personal information
- Born: 24 December 1902 Paris, France
- Died: 11 May 1990 (aged 87) Detroit, U.S.

Gérardo Apruzzese (24 December 1902 – 11 May 1990) was a French wrestler. He competed in the Greco-Roman bantamweight at the 1924 Summer Olympics.
