= Jan Vreede =

Dutch sailor

Personal information
- Full name: Jan Johannes Anthony Arnoldus Vreede
- Nationality: Dutch
- Born: 19 January 1900 Zaandam, Netherlands
- Died: 17 February 1989 (aged 89) Amsterdam, Netherlands

Sport

Sailing career
- Class: 6 Metre
Medal record
Sailing
Representing Netherlands
Olympic Games
Bronze medal – third place	1924 Paris	6 Metre
- Updated on 31 December 2013

Jan Johannes Anthony Arnoldus Vreede (19 January, 1900 – 17 February, 1989) was a sailor from the Netherlands, who represented his native country at the 1924 Summer Olympics in Paris, France. With helmsman Joop Carp and fellow crew member Anthonij Guépin, crewing the Dutch boat Willem Six, Vreede took the Bronze in the 6 Metre.
