= Kolsva =

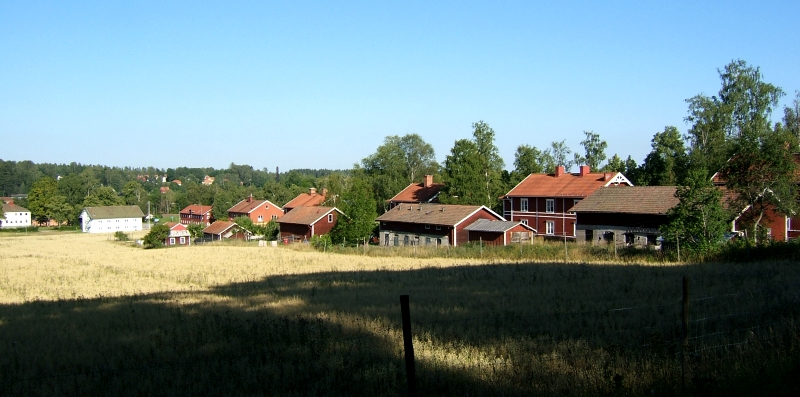

- Location within Västmanland Location within Sweden
- Coordinates: 59°36′N 15°50′E
- Country: Sweden
- Province: Västmanland
- County: Västmanland County
- Municipality: Köping Municipality

Area
  - Total: 3.25 km^{2} (1.25 sq mi)

Population (31 December 2010)
  - Total: 2,453
  - Density: 754/km^{2} (1,950/sq mi)
- Time zone: UTC+1 (CET)
  - Summer (DST): UTC+2 (CEST)

Kolsva (Swedish pronunciation: [ˈkôːlsva]) is a locality situated in Köping Municipality, Västmanland County, Sweden with 2,453 inhabitants in 2010.

Composer Ivar Widner was born in Kolsva.

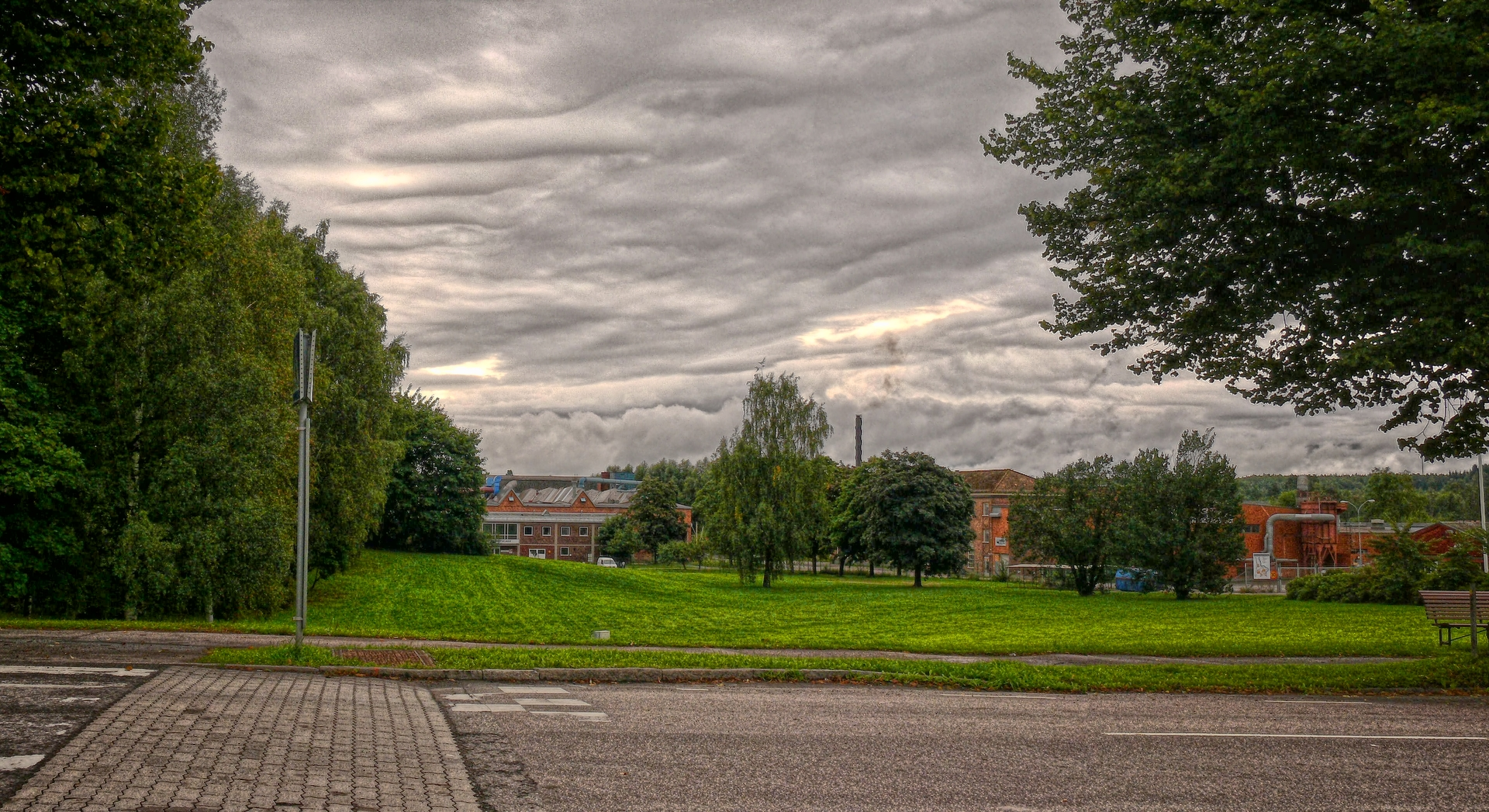
