= Harald Hagen =

Norwegian sailor

Olympic medal record

Men's sailing

Representing Norway
Gold medal – first place	1924 Paris	8 metre class

Harald Hagen Jr. (15 March 1902 – 24 May 1970) was a Norwegian sailor who competed in the 1924 Summer Olympics. In 1924 he won the gold medal as crew member of the Norwegian boat Bera in the 8 metre class event.
