= Sven Martinsen =

Norwegian wrestler

- Born: 28 September 1900; Porvoo, Finland
- Died: 9 September 1968 (aged 67); Østfold, Norway

Sven Martinsen (28 September 1900 – 9 September 1968) was a Norwegian sport wrestler.

He was born in Porvoo, Finland, and represented the Sarpsborg club TIL National. He won a gold medal in Greco-Roman wrestling at the 1929 European Wrestling Championships, a silver medal in 1930 and a bronze medal in 1933. He competed at the 1924 and 1928 Summer Olympics.
