= Henri Dierickx =

Belgian wrestler

- Born: 13 December 1893

Henri Dierickx (born 13 December 1893, date of death unknown) was a Belgian wrestler. He competed at the 1920 and 1924 Summer Olympics.
