= Anders Lundgren =

Norwegian sailor (1898–1964)

Olympic medal record

Men's sailing

Representing Norway
Gold medal – first place	1924 Paris	6 metre class

Anders Lundgren (25 June 1898 – 28 August 1964) was a Norwegian sailor who competed in the 1924 Summer Olympics. In 1924, he won the gold medal as crew member of the Norwegian boat Elisabeth V in the 6 metre class event.
