= Ragnvald Olsen =

Norwegian wrestler

- Born: 27 August 1897; Kristiania, Norway
- Died: 1 September 1948 (aged 51); Oslo, Norway

Ragnvald Olsen (27 August 1897 – 1 September 1948) was a Norwegian sport wrestler.

He was born in Kristiania and represented the club Fagforeningens IL. He competed at the 1924 Summer Olympics, when he placed tied fifth in Greco-Roman wrestling, the bantamweight class.
