= Rick Bockelie =

Norwegian sailor (1902–1966)

Olympic medal record

Men's sailing

Representing Norway
Gold medal – first place	1924 Paris	8 metre class

Rick Marlow Bockelie (28 May 1902 in Oslo – 18 February 1966 in Oslo) was a Norwegian sailor who competed in the 1924 Summer Olympics. In 1924 he won the gold medal as crew member of the Norwegian boat Bera in the 8 metre class event.
