= Christopher Dahl (sailor) =

Norwegian sailor

Olympic medal record

Men's sailing

Representing Norway
Gold medal – first place	1924 Paris	6 metre class

Christopher John Dahl (8 December 1898, Oslo – 26 December 1966, Oslo) was a Norwegian sailor who competed in the 1924 Summer Olympics. In 1924, he won the gold medal as a crew member of the Norwegian boat Elisabeth V in the 6 metre class event.
