= Pierre Gauthier (sailor) =

French sailor

Personal information
- Nationality: French
- Born: 21 January 1879 Paris, France
- Died: unknown

Sailing career
- Sport: Sailing
- Club: CVP, Les Mureaux (FRA)
- Class: 8 Metre
Medal record
Sailing
Representing France
Olympic Games
Bronze medal – third place	1924 Le Havre	8 Metre
- Updated on 2 March 2015

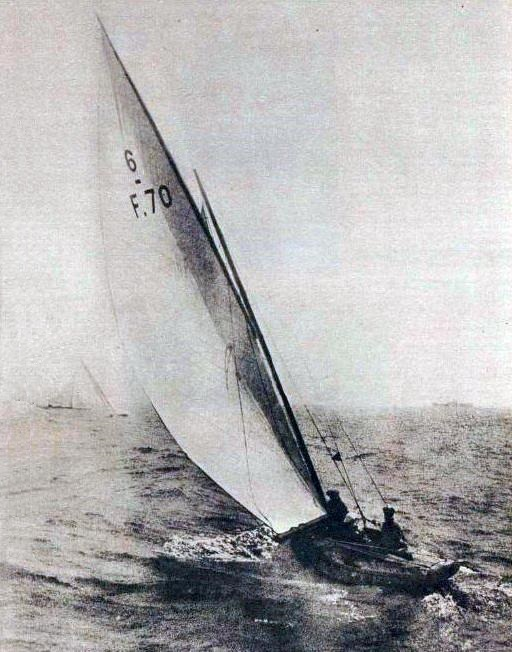
France third of the eight-metre yachts, on 'Namouça', at the 1924 Olympics (Le Havre).

Pierre Gauthier (27 June 1879 – 25 June 1944) was a sailor from France, who represented his country at the 1924 Summer Olympics in Le Havre, France. Gauthier took the bronze in the 8 Metre.

== Sources ==
- Evans, Hilary; Gjerde, Arild; Heijmans, Jeroen; Mallon, Bill; et al. "Pierre Gauthier Bio, Stats, and Results". Olympics at Sports-Reference.com. Sports Reference LLC. Archived from the original on 17 April 2020.
