= Väinö Ikonen =

Finnish wrestler (1895–1954)

- Born: 5 October 1895; Tuusniemi, Finland
- Died: 10 February 1954 (aged 58); Helsinki, Finland

Väinö Ikonen
Medal record

Men's Greco-Roman wrestling

Representing Finland

Olympic Games
Bronze medal – third place	1924 Paris	Bantamweight

Väinö Ikonen (5 October 1895 – 10 February 1954) was a Finnish wrestler. He was born in Tuusniemi. He won an Olympic bronze medal in Greco-Roman wrestling in 1924. He won a gold medal at the 1921 World Wrestling Championships.
