= Carl Ringvold =

Norwegian sailor

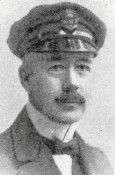

Personal information
- Full name: Carl August Ringvold
- Nationality: Norwegian
- Born: 3 March 1876 Oslo
- Died: 22 January 1960 (aged 83) Oslo

Sport

Sailing career
- Class: 8 Metre
- Club: Royal Norwegian Yacht Club
Medal record
sailing
Representing Norway
Olympic Games
Gold medal – first place	1920 Antwerp	8 metre class (1907 rating)
Gold medal – first place	1924 Paris	8 metre class
- Updated on 2 January 2014

Carl August Ringvold (3 April 1876 – 22 February 1960) was a Norwegian sailor who competed in the 1920 Summer Olympics and in the 1924 Summer Olympics. In 1920, he was a crew member of the Norwegian boat Irene, which won the gold medal in the 8 Metre (1907 rating). Four years later, he won his second gold medal in the 8 metre class together with his son Carl Ringvold Jr.
