= Sailing at the 1924 Summer Olympics – Monotype =

French National Monotype 1924 at the Games of the VIII Olympiad
- Line drawing of the French National Monotype 1924
- Venue: France, Meulan
- Dates: First race: 10 July 1924; Last race: 13 July 1924
- Competitors: 17 from 17 nations
- Teams: 17

Medalists
1st place, gold medalist(s)		Léon Huybrechts	Belgium
2nd place, silver medalist(s)		Henrik Robert	Norway
3rd place, bronze medalist(s)		Hans Dittmar	Finland

The French National Monotype was a sailing event on the Sailing at the 1924 Summer Olympics program in Meulan. A program of elimination and semi-finals and, where needed, sail-offs were scheduled. 17 sailors from 17 nation competed using eight boats The eight boats were provided by the French Olympic Committee. A rotation scheme was used to accommodate all 17 sailors. The sails were swapped so that every sailor used the same sail number every time. The windvane on top of the mast was in the colors of the sailor's national flag.

== Race schedule ==
In this class a total of 17 competitors participated. The France Olympic Committee had made available a total of 8 mostly identical boats. So here the fleet was divided in two flights of eight. In each elimination series one country was exempt and was automatically qualified for the semi-final. Per flight the best two boats earned a place in the semi-final. Finally a sail off was held for the places 2–4.

●	Elimination serie (E)	●	Semi-finals (SF) and Sail-off (SO)

Date	July			
Date	10th Thu	11th Fri	12th Sat	13th Sun
Date	Meulan			
French National Monotype 1924	E1	E2	SF1	SF2; SO
Total gold medals				1

== Course area and course configuration ==
1924 Olympic Course Area Meulan

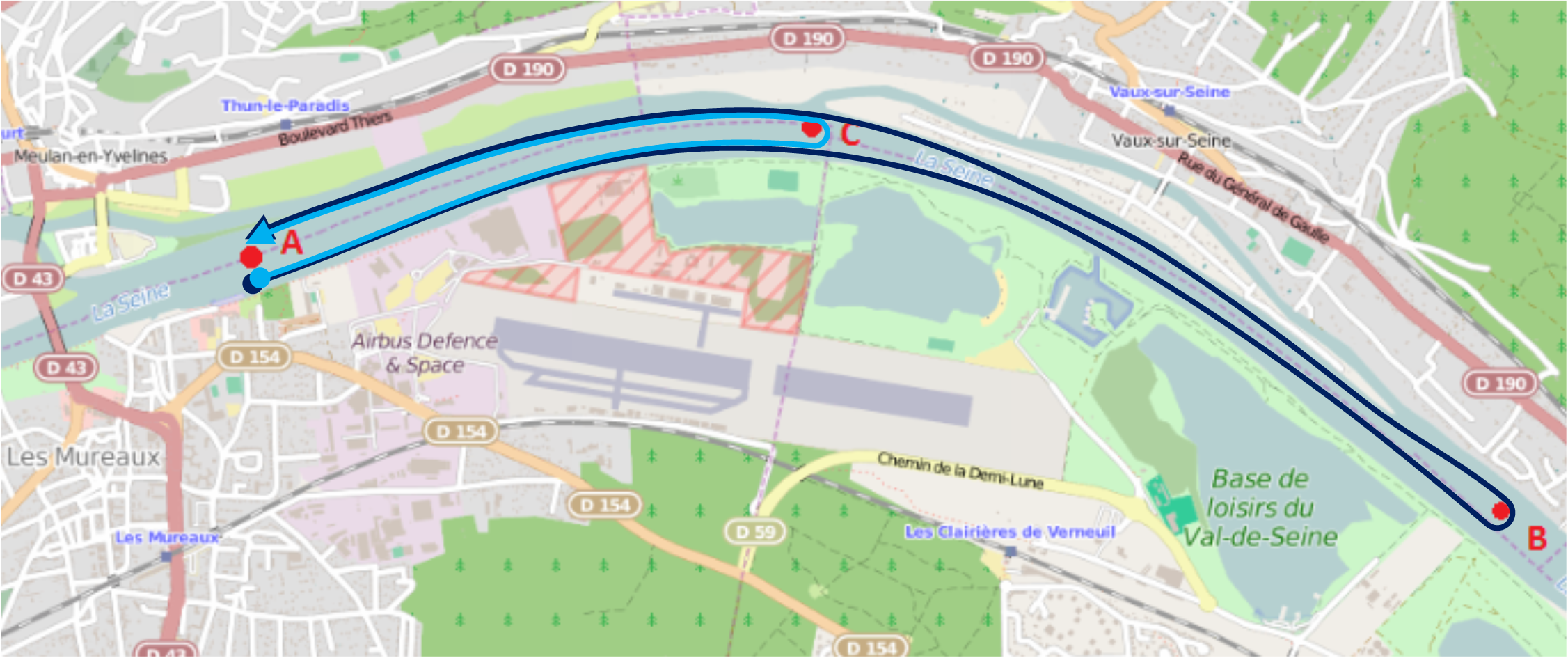
Courses at Plan du Bassin du Meulan les Mureaux
A: Start and Finish
B: Mark long course 4.0 nautical miles (7.4 km)
C: Mark short course 1.6 nautical miles (3.0 km)

== Weather conditions ==
Date	Race	Course	Wind speed	Wind direction	Start
10-JUL-1924	1st Elimination series	Short 2x	Light breeze		14:30 and 14:45
11-JUL-1924	2nd Elimination series	Short 2x	Light breeze		15:40 and 15:55
12-JUL-1924	1st Semi-final	Short 3x	Gentle breeze		14:30
13-JUL-1924	2nd Semi-final	Short 3x	Moderate breeze		14:00
13-JUL-1924	Sail-off	Short 2x	Moderate breeze		16:30

== Results ==
=== Poules ===
For the elimination series four poules were formed:

A	B	C	D
Argentina	France	Denmark	Canada
Belgium	Monaco	Spain	Finland
Great Britain	Norway	South Africa	Poland
Netherlands	Switzerland	Czechoslovakia	Portugal
			Sweden

=== Elimination series ===
Series	Red	Blue	Exempt
1st	A – B	C – D	Portugal
2nd	A – C	B – D	Sweden

=== Final results ===
Competitors who scored a first or a second place in the elimination series or were exempt in one of the races were qualified (Q) for the semi-finals.

Pos	Sail No.	Sailor	Nationality	Qual. Race AA		Qual. Race AB		Qual. Race BA		Qual. Race BB		Final Race 1			Final Race 2			Total
Pos	Sail No.	Sailor	Nationality	Pos.	hr:mm:sec	Pos.	hr:mm:sec	Pos.	hr:mm:sec	Pos.	hr:mm:sec	Pos.	hr:mm:sec	Pts	Pos.	hr:mm:sec	Pts	Total
1	5	Léon Huybrechts	Belgium	Q2	1:58:26		::	DSQ (C)	1:01:32		::	1	1:32:4	1	1	1:45:47	1	2
2	10	Henrik Robert	Norway		::	Q1	1:55:56		::	4	2:12:39	2	1:35:3	2	4	1:49:52	5	7
3	28	Hans Erik Dittmar	Finland	Q1	1:58:35		::		::	Q2	2:05:27	5	1:44:58	5	3	1:47:39	3	8
4	22	Santiago Amat Cansino	Spain		::	Q2	1:57:4	4	2:19:54		::	4	1:41:27	4	4	1:48:20	4	8
5	36	Johan Hin	Netherlands	RET (M)	::		::	Q1	1:58:39		::	DSQ (M)	1:42:13	8	2	1:45:51	2	10
6	21	Clarence Hammar	Sweden	E3	2:01:12		::		::		::	3	1:36:32	3	8	1:48:36	8	11
7	16	Gordon Fowler	Great Britain	4	2:02:40		::	Q2	2:08:15		::	6	1:48:9	6	6	1:52:30	6	12
8	7	Frederico Burnay	Portugal		::		::		::	Q1	2:02:03	ABN	::	8	7	2:05:42	7	15
9	3	Bernardo Milhas	Argentina	5	2:3:15		::	3	2:19:1		::		::		::			
9	26	Rupert Ellis-Brown	South Africa		::	3	1:57:25	5	2:22:14		::		::		::			
9	8	Ella Maillart	Switzerland		::	5	1:59:50		::	3	2:10:30		::		::			
9	11	André Michelet	France		::	4	1:59:10		::	5	2:13:34		::		::			
9	21	Edward Bryzemejster	Poland	6	2:5:10		::		::	6	2:16:37		::		::			
9	4	Eduard Bürgmeister	Czechoslovakia		::	7	2:02:26	6	2:31:35		::		::		::			
9	12	Norm Robertson	Canada	7	2:05:30		::		::	7	2:17:30		::		::			
9	34	Émile Barral	Monaco		::	6	2:01:31		::	ABN	::-		::		::			
9	1	Aage Høy Pedersen	Denmark		::	ABN	::-	7	2:31:44		::		::		::			

RET (M) Hit Mark
DSQ (M) Hit Mark
DSQ (C) Collision
ABN Abandonend

=== Daily standings ===
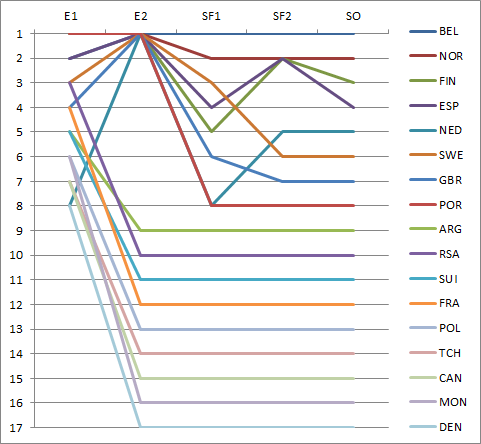
Graph showing the daily standings in the French National Monotype during the 1924 Summer Olympics

== Notes ==
Since Norway won from Finland and Finland from Spain in the first semi final and since Finland won from Spain and Spain from Norway in the second semi final there was a tie between those countries. This tie was broken by a Sail-off (Race 5).

== Other information ==
=== Sailors ===
During the Sailing regattas at the 1924 Summer Olympics among others the following persons were competing in the various classes:

French National Monotype sailors at the 1924 Olympic Games
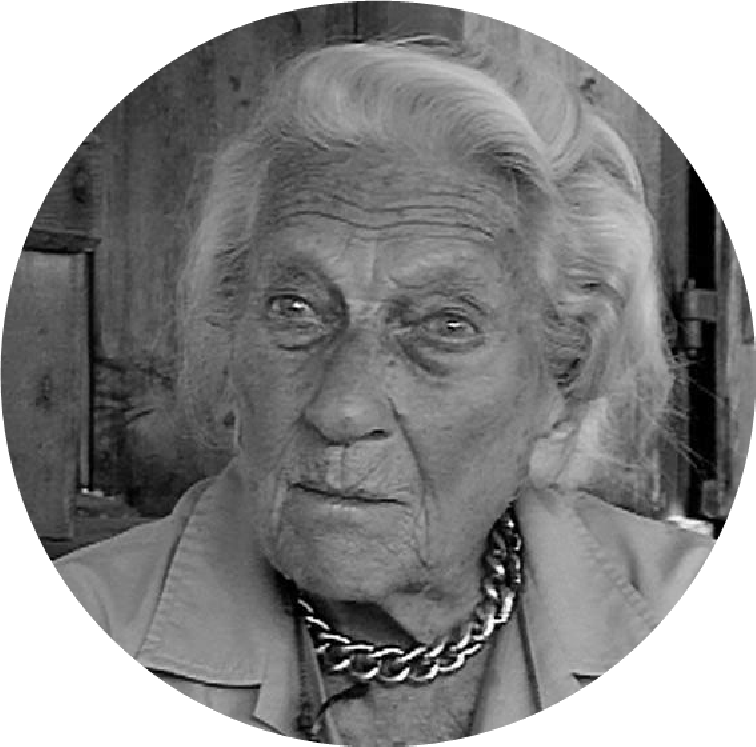
Ella Maillart (SUI)
Only woman entered in 1924

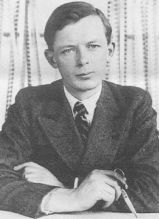
Johan Hin (NED)

Léon Huybrechts (BEL)
Gold medalist
