= Fred Morris =

Fred Morris may refer to:

- Fred Morris (bishop) (1884–1965), Anglican bishop in North Africa
- Fred Morris (footballer, born 1893) (1893–1962), English football player for West Bromwich Albion
- Fred Morris (footballer, born 1929) (1929–1998), English football player for Walsall and Liverpool
- Freddie Morris (1920–1973), English football player for Barnsley and Southend United

== See also ==
- Frederick Morris, former Irish High Court judge
- Frederick Morris (sailor) (1905–1971), American sailor
- Frederick Maurice (disambiguation)
