= Frits Mulder =

Belgian sailor

Personal information
- Nationality: Belgian

Sailing career
- Class: 6 Metre
- Updated on 18 March 2015

Frits Mulder was a sailor from Belgium, who represented his country at the 1928 Summer Olympics in Amsterdam, Netherlands. Mulder, as crew member on the Belgian 6 Metre Ubu, took 5th place with helmsman A. J. J. Fridt and fellow crew members Ludovic Franck, Willy Van Rompaey and Arthur Sneyers.

== Sources ==
- "Frits Mulder Bio, Stats, and Results". Olympic Sports. Sports-Reference.com. Archived from the original on 2 April 2015.
