= Royal Hamilton Yacht Club =

Yacht club in Hamilton, Ontario, Canada

Coordinates: 43°16′27″N 79°51′52″W

- Coat of arms

- Burgee

- Heraldic badge

- Ensign
- Short name: RHYC
- Founded: 1888; 138 years ago
- Location: MacNab Street North, Hamilton, Ontario, Canada, L8L 1H1
- Website: www.rhyc.ca

The Royal Hamilton Yacht Club (RHYC) is located in Hamilton, Ontario, Canada, at the west end of Lake Ontario, and has been in existence since 1888. When the yacht club first opened, it was located on the Burlington Canal (near the light station), along the beach strip that separates Burlington Bay from Lake Ontario. It later moved to the foot of Bay Street. Since its founding in 1888, RHYC has promoted local and international yacht racing.

The original Letters Patent, dated 30 May 1891, identifies the purpose of the club's founding:

"To establish and maintain a Club as a Corporation having for its objects the encouragement of Yacht building and Yacht sailing and racing on Ontario waters by the name of "The Royal Hamilton Yacht Club" the said club have been permitted by Us to assume the Style of 'Royal'..."

The unique climatic, geographic, and hydrographic qualities provided by Hamilton Harbour give The Club one of the longest sailing seasons in central Canada. The club has won several Ontario Sailing Association awards in recent years, including Regatta of the Year (2002, 2007) and several Youth Performance Ranking Trophies.

== History ==
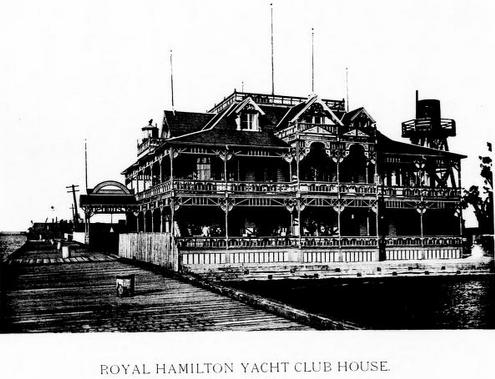
Royal Hamilton Yacht Club, c. 1894

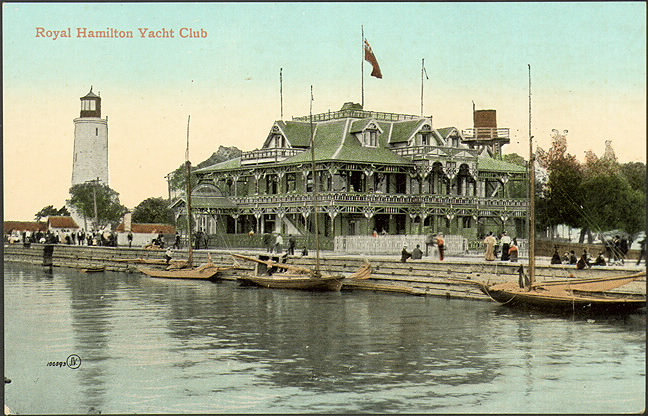
The clubhouse, c. 1910

The Royal Hamilton Yacht Club was founded in 1890. Aemilius Jarvis organized the establishment of the club two years prior, in 1888. It received permission for use of the prefix Royal. It also received permission from the British Admiralty to use the Blue Ensign.

In 1891, William Stewart designed the Royal Hamilton Yacht Club's clubhouse at Burlington Beach. The clubhouse had its grand opening on October 3, 1891. The maritime features included a swing bridge and a lighthouse.

The Department of the Interior and Department of Marine and Fisheries leased a water lot to the Hamilton Yacht Club 1891–1915.

In 1895, Alfred W. Peene designed the Victoria Yacht Club, at the foot of Wellington Street North, in Hamilton.

In 1907, the Royal Hamilton Yacht Club was featured in a Hamilton Souvenir Calendar Published by Stanley Mills & Cl. Ltd., Hamilton, Canada.

In 1915, the Royal Hamilton Yacht Club's clubhouse burned.

In 1924, RHYC's Norman Robertson earned the right to represent Canada and he became this country's first Olympic sailor when he competed at the Paris Olympiad that year. In the years since, RHYC has been home to champions at the local, national, and international levels.

In 1940–41, the Royal Canadian Navy Reserves scheme for training yacht club members developed the first central registry system.

Many of the young sailors who have represented Canada in international competition have been members of, or trained by, the Royal Hamilton Yacht Club. For nearly half a century, RHYC's Youth Sailing Program, and, more recently, its Graduate Program, have helped these young men and women develop the skills and attitudes they need to excel in international competition. The success of these is due largely to the work of dedicated volunteers from the RHYC sailing community. Recent awards won by young Hamilton sailors include the E. Aileen Clarke Youth Performance Ranking Trophy awarded to the highest-ranking Club in the 13 and Under Provincial Youth Regatta Series (2005, 2001), and the Unistrut Central Youth Performance Ranking Trophy for winning the 16 and under series in 1998.

The club has also figured prominently in international match racing. In 1978, RHYC's Don Green and his crew took Evergreen to the Bayview Yacht Club in Detroit to recapture the Canada's Cup for Canada. Evergreen's feats are commemorated in The club's Evergreen lounge. RHYC sailors defended the cup successfully in 1981 and 1984.

In 2008, RHYC celebrates the 120th anniversary of its founding, the 50th anniversary of its Youth Sailing program, and the 30th anniversary of RHYC yacht Evergreen's victory in the Canada Cup.

=== Notable events ===
- 1895: Lake Yacht Racing Association (LYRA)
- 1924: RHYC member Norm Robertson competes as Canada's first Olympic sailor
- 1930: Sailing venue for the first British Empire Games
- 1978: Don Green (Evergreen) recaptures the Canada's Cup from the Bayview Yacht Club
- 1981, 1984: RHYC sailors successfully defend the Canada's Cup
- 2002: RHYC hosts the International Europe Class World Championships, a qualifier for the 2004 Athens Olympics
- 2003: RHYC hosts the LYRA annual regatta.
- 2018: Former NHL Goaltender Ray Emery found dead by drowning after a diving accident on July 15, 2018
