= Rupert Ellis-Brown =

South African sailor and mayor of Durban

Personal information
- Nationality: South African
- Born: 26 October 1880 Durban, Natal Colony
- Died: 28 June 1969 (aged 88) Durban, South Africa

Sailing career
- Sport: Sailing
- Club: Royal Natal Yacht Club, Durban (RSA)
- Class: French National Monotype 1924
- Updated on 6 March 2015

Rupert Ellis-Brown (26 October 1880 – 28 June 1969) was a sailor from South Africa, who represented his country at the 1924 Summer Olympics in Meulan, France. He served as mayor of Durban during the 1940s.

== Life and career ==
Brown was born to father Joseph Ellis-Brown, he also had a brother, Cecil Ellis-Brown. He retired from politics at the age of 70, serving as a councillor from 1935 to 1950, the mayor of Durban from 1939 to 1945 and again from 1946 to 1947.

== Sources ==
- "Rupert Ellis-Brown Bio, Stats, and Results". Olympic Sports. Sports Reference. Archived from the original on 18 April 2020.
- Les Jeux de la VIIIe Olympiade Paris 1924:rapport official (PDF) (in French). Paris: Librairie de France: Comité Olympique Français. 1924.
