= Edward Bryzemejster =

Polish sailor

Personal information
- Nationality: Polish
- Born: 3 April 1877
- Died: unknown

Sailing career
- Sport: Sailing
- Club: WKW Warszawa
- Class: French National Monotype 1924
Competition record
Sailing
Representing Poland
Olympic Games
1924 Meulan	Monotype class
- Updated on 6 March 2015

Edward Bryzemejster (born 3 April 1877, date of death unknown) was a sailor from Poland, who represented his country at the 1924 Summer Olympics in Meulan, France.

== Sources ==
- "Edward Bryzemejster Bio, Stats, and Results". Olympic Sports. Sports-Reference.com. Archived from the original on 18 April 2020.
- Les Jeux de la VIIIe Olympiade Paris 1924:rapport official (PDF) (in French). Paris: Librairie de France: Comité Olympique Français. 1924. Archived from the original (PDF) on 21 April 2013.
