= Willy Van Rompaey =

Belgian sailor

Personal information
- Nationality: Belgian
- Born: 24 March 1911 Antwerp

Sport

Sailing career
- Class: 6 Metre
- Updated on 18 March 2015

Willy Van Rompaey (24 March 1911 – 22 January 1997) was a sailor from Belgium, who represented his country at the 1928 Summer Olympics in Amsterdam, Netherlands. Van Rompaey, as crew member on the Belgian 6 Metre Ubu, took 5th place with helmsman A. J. J. Fridt and fellow crew members Ludovic Franck, Frits Mulder and Arthur Sneyers. He also competed in the 6 Metre event at the 1948 Summer Olympics.

== Sources ==
- "Willy Van Rompaey Bio, Stats, and Results". Olympic Sports. Sports-Reference.com. Archived from the original on 18 April 2020.
