= Sebők =

Sebők is a Hungarian surname.

== People ==
- Balázs Sebők (born 1994), Hungarian ice hockey player
- György Sebők (1922-1999), Hungarian-born American pianist and academic
- Joe Sebok (born 1977), American poker player
- József Sebők (born 1975), Hungarian football player
- Lilly Dubowitz (1930-2016), Hungarian-born British paediatrician, born Lilly Sebők
- Margit Sebők (1939–2000), Hungarian painter and educator
- Sándor Sebők, Hungarian sailor
- Thomas Sebeok (1920-2001), Hungarian-born American semiotician and linguist, born Sebők
- Vilmos Sebők (born 1973), Hungarian football player
- Zsolt Sebők (born 1979), Hungarian football player
