= Tarsis =

Tarsis is both a given name and a surname. Notable people with the name include:

- Tarsis Bonga (born 1997), German footballer
- Tarsis Humphreys (born 1983), Brazilian jiu-jitsu practitioner
- Tarsis Orogot (born 2002), Ugandan sprinter
- Giacomo Tarsis (1906–1978), Italian sailor
- Valery Tarsis (1906–1983), Ukrainian writer
- Felipe Tarsis de Acuña (1548–1620), Roman Catholic prelate
- Allan Tarsis Munaaba (born 1989), Ugandan footballer
