= Bernardo Milhas =

Argentine sailor

Personal information
- Full name: Bernardo E. Milhas
- Nationality: Argentine
- Born: 1890

Sport

Sailing career
- Class(es): French National Monotype 1924; 8 Metre
Competition record
Sailing
Representing Argentina
Olympic Games
	1924 Meulan	Monotype class
4th	1924 Le Havre	8 Metre
- Updated on 6 March 2015

Bernardo E. Milhas (born 1890, date of death unknown) was a sailor from Argentina, who represented his country at the 1924 Summer Olympics in Meulan, France.

== Sources ==
- "Bernardo Milhas Bio, Stats, and Results". Olympic Sports. Sports-Reference.com. Archived from the original on 18 April 2020.
- Les Jeux de la VIIIe Olympiade Paris 1924:rapport official (PDF) (in French). Paris: Librairie de France: Comité Olympique Français. 1924. Archived from the original (PDF) on 21 April 2013.
