= Frederico Burnay =

Portuguese sailor

Personal information
- Full name: Frederico Guilherme Duff Burnay de Mendonça
- Nationality: Portuguese
- Born: 15 August 1888 Coruche, Portugal
- Died: 10 February 1964 (aged 75) Lisbon, Portugal

Sailing career
- Sport: Sailing
- Class: French National Monotype 1924
Competition record
Sailing
Representing Portugal
Olympic Games
1924 Meulan	Monotype class
1928 Zuiderzee	6 Metre
- Updated on 18 March 2015

Frederico Guilherme Duff Burnay de Mendonça (15 August 1888 – 10 February 1964) was a sailor from Portugal, who represented his country at the 1924 Summer Olympics in Meulan, France and at the 1928 Summer Olympics in the Zuiderzee, Netherlands.

== Sources ==
- "Frederico Burnay Bio, Stats, and Results". Olympic Sports. Sports-Reference.com. Archived from the original on 7 October 2014.
- Les Jeux de la VIIIe Olympiade Paris 1924:rapport official (PDF) (in French). Paris: Librairie de France: Comité Olympique Français. 1924. Archived from the original (PDF) on 21 April 2013.
