= Ludovic Franck =

Belgian sailor

Personal information
- Nationality: Belgian
- Born: 28 December 1907
- Died: 15 September 1988 (aged 80)

Sailing career
- Class: 6 Metre
- Updated on 17 November 2015

Ludovic Franck (28 December 1907 – 15 September 1988) was a sailor from Belgium, who represented his country at the 1928 Summer Olympics in Amsterdam, Netherlands. Franck, as crew member on the Belgian 6 Metre Ubu, took 5th place with helmsman A. J. J. Fridt and fellow crew members Frits Mulder, Willy Van Rompaey and Arthur Sneyers. He also competed in the 6 Metre event at the 1948 Summer Olympics.

== Sources ==
- "Ludovic Franck Bio, Stats, and Results". Olympic Sports. Sports-Reference.com. Archived from the original on 18 April 2020.
