= Arthur Sneyers =

Belgian sailor

Personal information
- Nationality: Belgian

Sailing career
- Class: 6 Metre

Arthur Sneyers was a Belgian sailor, who represented his country at the 1928 Summer Olympics in Amsterdam, Netherlands. Sneyers, as crew member on the Belgian 6 Metre Ubu, took 5th place with helmsman A. J. J. Fridt and fellow crew members Ludovic Franck, Frits Mulder and Willy Van Rompaey. Sneyers is deceased.

== Sources ==
- "Arthur Sneyers Bio, Stats, and Results". Olympic Sports. Sports-Reference.com. Archived from the original on 18 April 2020.
