= Albert Michelet =

French sailor

Personal information
- Full name: Albert Charles Marie Michelet
- Nationality: French
- Born: 19 June 1869 Paris, France
- Died: 30 July 1928 (aged 59)

Sport

Sailing career
- Class: French National Monotype 1924
- Club: CVP, Les Mureaux (FRA)
- Updated on 6 March 2015

Albert Charles Marie Michelet (19 June 1869 – 30 July 1928) was a sailor from France, who represented his country at the 1924 Summer Olympics in Meulan, France.

== Sources ==
- "Albert Michelet Bio, Stats, and Results". Olympic Sports. Sports-Reference.com. Archived from the original on 17 April 2020.
- Les Jeux de la VIIIe Olympiade Paris 1924:rapport official (PDF) (in French). Paris: Librairie de France: Comité Olympique Français. 1924. Archived from the original (PDF) on 21 April 2013.
