= Carl Wentzel (sailor) =

German sailor

Personal information
- Full name: Carl Hermann Wentzel
- Nationality: German
- Born: 5 December 1895
- Died: 29 September 1952 (aged 56)

Sport

Sailing career
- Class: 6 Metre
- Club: Bayerischer Yacht-Club, Starnberg (GER)

Carl Hermann Wentzel (5 December 1895 – 29 September 1952) was a sailor from Germany, who represented his country at the 1928 Summer Olympics in Amsterdam, Netherlands.

== Sources ==
- "Carl Wentzel Bio, Stats, and Results". Olympic Sports. Sports-Reference.com. Archived from the original on 17 April 2020.
