= Francesco Cameli =

Personal information
- Nationality: Italian
- Born: 25 May 1899 Genoa
- Died: 21 December 1957 (aged 58)

Sailing career
- Sport: Sailing
- Club: Yacht Club Italiano, Genova (ITA)
- Class: 6 Metre
Competition record
Sailing
Representing Italy
Olympic Games
10th	1928 Amsterdam	6 Metre
- Updated on 18 March 2015

Francesco Cameli (25 May 1899 – 21 December 1957) was a sailor from Italy, who represented his country at the 1928 Summer Olympics in Amsterdam, Netherlands.
