= Georg Faehlmann =

Estonian sailor

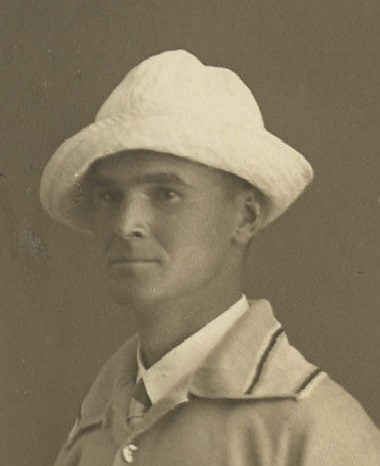
- Faehlmann in 1928

Personal information
- Born: 1895
Medal record
Men's Sailing
Bronze medal – third place	1928 Amsterdam	6 metre class

Georg R. Faehlmann (17 September 1895–8 March 1975) was an Imperial Russian Navy officer, Master Mariner and yachtsman.

== Biography ==
Georg Faehlmann was born in Vladivostok, Imperial Russia, as son to Rudolf Faehlmann and Seraphine Sakin. The family returned to Europe in 1900 and eventually settled in Reval, Estonia, his father’s hometown, in 1905. 1910-1913 Domschule, 1914-1915 St Petersburg University (mathematics 2 semesters), 1915-1917 Garde Marine St. Petersburg, 1918 sub-lieutenant on board the cruiser ”Bogatyr”, 1918-1922 Baltic Submarine Flotilla.

Discharged and repatriated to Estonia after the Dorpat peace treaty, 1922. 1923 first mate in the Estonian Merchant Navy, from 1933 Master Mariner. Partner of the shipping company Kaesmu Laeva Omanikud (KLO). Married to Linda Rootsmann 1935 and had two children, George (1936) and Marianne-Dorothy (1938).

He was master of the s/s ”Linda” on time charter from Blyth to Gothenburg with the load of coal when she was sunk by a German submarine on 11 February 1940, 100 miles South of Utsira (Norway). Master (his right foot seriously injured) and crew (except one) were saved by the Swedish ship ”Birgitta” and landed at Kopervik (Norway).

1941 The family migrated to Poland. 1941-1945 Kriegsmarine. 1945-1947 Schleswig Port Control, interpreter (English, German and Russian), 1947-1968 serving on board ships belonging to the British Ministry of Transport and on ex-Estonian ships.

Georg Faehlmann was together with his brother Andreas Faehlmann onboard the Estonian 6-metre yacht ”Tutti V” which won the Olympic bronze medal in Amsterdam 1928.

He died in Bad Schwartau, Federal Republic of Germany, 8 March 1975.

His great granduncle was the distinguished Estonian philologist and physician Friedrich Robert Faehlmann.
