= Hans Fokker =

Dutch sailor

Personal information
- Full name: Hendrik Gustaaf Fokker
- Nationality: Dutch
- Born: February 18, 1900 Rotterdam
- Died: July 2, 1943 (aged 43) Thanbyuzayat

Sport

Sailing career
- Class: 6 Metre
- Updated on 18 March 2015

Hendrik Gustaaf "Hans" Fokker (February 18, 1900, in Rotterdam – July 2, 1943, in Thanbyuzayat) was a sailor from the Netherlands, who represented his native country at the 1928 Summer Olympics in Amsterdam. Fokker as crew member on the Dutch 6 Metre Kemphaan took the 4th place with helmsman Hans Pluijgers and fellow crew members: Carl Huisken, Wim Schouten and Roeffie Vermeulen.

Hans died of a tropical disease in 1943 in Thanbyuzayat during internment in Burma.

== Sources ==
- "Hans Fokker Bio, Stats, and Results". Olympic Sports. Sports-Reference.com. Archived from the original on 2020-04-18.
- "Zeilen, een bij uitstek Nederlandsche sport. De Olympische wedstrijden ditmaal zeer goed bezet. — Wat zal de wind doen ?" (in Dutch) (Morning ed.). Het volk : dagblad voor de arbeiderspartĳ. 1928-08-02.
- "The Ninth Olympiad Amsterdam 1928:Officiel Report" (PDF). Amsterdam: The Netherlands Olympic Committee. 1928. Archived from the original (PDF) on 2008-04-08.
