= Sándor Burger =

Hungarian sailor

Personal information
- Nationality: Hungarian
- Born: 7 February 1899 Budapest
- Died: April 1978 (aged 79)

Sailing career
- Sport: Sailing
- Club: KMYC, (HUN)
- Class: 6 Metre
Competition record
Sailing
Representing Hungary
Olympic Games
1928 Amsterdam	6 Metre
- Updated on 18 March 2015

Sándor Burger (7 February 1899 – April 1978) was a sailor from Hungary, who represented his country at the 1928 Summer Olympics in Amsterdam, Netherlands.

== Sources ==
- "Sándor Burger Bio, Stats, and Results". Olympic Sports. Sports-Reference.com. Archived from the original on 18 April 2020.
