= Carlos Eduardo Bleck =

Portuguese sailor

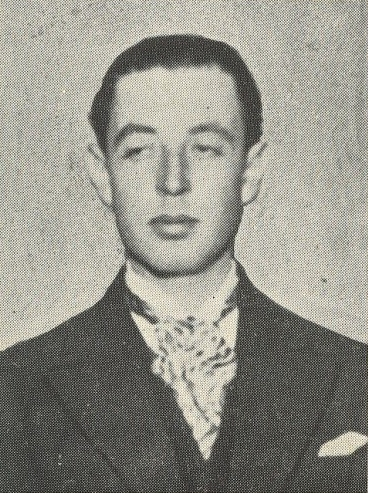

Personal information
- Nationality: Portuguese
- Born: 23 May 1903 Oeiras, Portugal
- Died: 2 December 1975 (aged 72)

Sailing career
- Sport: Sailing
- Class: 6 Metre
Competition record
Sailing
Representing Portugal
Olympic Games
1928 Amsterdam	6 Metre
- Updated on 18 March 2015

Carlos Eduardo Bleck was a sailor from Portugal, who represented his country at the 1928 Summer Olympics in Amsterdam, Netherlands.

== Sources ==
- "Carlos Eduardo Bleck Bio, Stats, and Results". Olympic Sports. Sports-Reference.com. Archived from the original on 18 April 2020.
