= Léon Huybrechts =

Belgian sailor (1876–1956)

Personal information
- Nationality: Belgian
- Born: 11 February 1876
- Died: 9 February 1956 (aged 79)

Sailing career
- Sport: Sailing
Medal record
Sailing
Representing Belgium
Olympic Games
Silver medal – second place	1908 London	6 Metre
Silver medal – second place	1920 Antwerp	6 Metre
Gold medal – first place	1924 Paris	Monotype
- Updated on 8 May 2015

Léon Huybrechts (11 February 1876 – 9 February 1956) was a Belgian sailor and Olympic champion. He competed at the 1924 Summer Olympics in Paris, where he won a gold medal in the French National Monotype 1924. He won silver medals in the 6 m class in 1908 and 1920.
