= Harry Hanson (sailor) =

Swedish sailor

Personal information
- Full name: Harry Vilgot Hanson
- Nationality: Swedish
- Born: 23 September 1900 Gothenburg
- Died: 12 July 1986 (aged 85) Västra Frölunda

Sailing career
- Sport: Sailing
- Club: GKSS
- Class: 6 Metre
- Updated on 18 March 2015

Harry Vilgot Hanson (23 September 1900 – 12 June 1986) was a sailor from Sweden, who represented his country at the 1928 Summer Olympics in Amsterdam, Netherlands.

== Sources ==
- "Harry Hanson Bio, Stats, and Results". Olympic Sports. Sports-Reference.com. Archived from the original on 17 April 2020.
