= Georg Lindahl =

Swedish sailor

Personal information
- Full name: Georg Fredrik Lindahl
- Nationality: Swedish
- Born: 24 November 1899 Gothenburg
- Died: 21 May 1970 (aged 70) Gothenburg

Sailing career
- Sport: Sailing
- Club: GKSS
- Class: 6 Metre
- Updated on 18 March 2015

Georg Fredrik Lindahl was a sailor from Sweden, who represented his country at the 1928 Summer Olympics in Amsterdam, Netherlands.

== Sources ==
- "Georg Lindahl Bio, Stats, and Results". Olympic Sports. Sports-Reference.com. Archived from the original on 2 April 2015.
