= Hakon Reuter =

Swedish sailor

Personal information
- Full name: Hakon Alexander Reuter
- Nationality: Swedish
- Born: 4 January 1899 Gothenburg
- Died: 2 December 1969 (aged 70) Mallorca

Sport

Sailing career
- Class: 6 Metre
- Club: GKSS
- Updated on 18 March 2015

Hakon Alexander Reuter was a sailor from Sweden, who represented his country at the 1928 Summer Olympics in Amsterdam, Netherlands.

== Sources ==
- "Hakon Reuter Bio, Stats, and Results". Olympic Sports. Sports-Reference.com. Archived from the original on 17 April 2020.
