= János Mihálkovics =

Hungarian sailor

Personal information
- Nationality: Hungarian
- Born: 3 June 1889
- Died: 6 February 1958 (aged 68)

Sailing career
- Sport: Sailing
- Club: KMYC, (HUN)
- Class: 6 Metre
Competition record
Sailing
Representing Hungary
Olympic Games
1928 Amsterdam	6 Metre
- Updated on 18 March 2015

János Mihálkovics (3 June 1889 – 6 February 1958) was a sailor from Hungary who represented his country in the 6 Metre sailing event at the 1928 Summer Olympics program in Amsterdam, Netherlands.
