= Frederick Maurice =

Frederick Maurice may refer to:

- Frederick Maurice (British Army officer, born 1841) (1841–1912), English general, son of the theologian
- Frederick Maurice (military historian) (1871–1951), English general, son of the general born in 1841
- F. D. Maurice (Frederick Denison Maurice, 1805–1872), English theologian

== See also ==
- Fred Morris (disambiguation)
