= Henry Allard (sailor) =

French sailor

Personal information
- Full name: Henry Aurélien Charles Allard
- Nationality: French
- Born: 13 May 1885 Bordeaux
- Died: 20 March 1953 (aged 67) Bordeaux

Sailing career
- Sport: Sailing
- Club: Cercle de la Voile d'Arcachon
- Class: 6 Metre

Henry Aurélien Charles Allard (1885–1953) was a sailor from France, who represented his country at the 1928 Summer Olympics in Amsterdam, Netherlands.

== Sources ==
- "Henry Allard Bio, Stats, and Results". Olympic Sports. Sports Reference. Archived from the original on 2 April 2015.
