= Roeffie Vermeulen =

Dutch sailor

Personal information
- Full name: Roelof Jan Vermeulen
- Nationality: Dutch
- Born: 26 February 1906 Leeuwarden
- Died: 28 June 1963 (aged 57) Leeuwarden

Sport

Sailing career
- Class: 6 Metre
- Updated on 18 March 2015

Roelof Jan "Roeffie" Vermeulen (26 February 1906 in Leeuwarden – 28 June 1963, Leeuwarden) was a sailor from the Netherlands, who represented his native country at the 1928 Summer Olympics in Amsterdam. Vermeulen, as crew member on the Dutch 6 Metre Kemphaan, took the 4th place with helmsman Hans Pluijgers and fellow crew members: Hans Fokker, Wim Schouten and Carl Huisken.

== Sources ==
- "Roeffie Vermeulen Bio, Stats, and Results". Olympic Sports. Sports-Reference.com. Archived from the original on 2020-04-18.
- "Zeilen, een bij uitstek Nederlandsche sport. De Olympische wedstrijden ditmaal zeer goed bezet. — Wat zal de wind doen ?" (in Dutch) (Morning ed.). Het volk : dagblad voor de arbeiderspartĳ. 1928-08-02.
- "The Ninth Olympiad Amsterdam 1928:Officiel Report" (PDF). Amsterdam: The Netherlands Olympic Committee. 1928. Archived from the original (PDF) on 2008-04-08.
