= Yngve Lindqvist =

Swedish sailor

Personal information
- Full name: Oskar Yngve Ludvig Lindqvist
- Nationality: Swedish
- Born: 24 June 1897 Gothenburg
- Died: 15 July 1937 (aged 40) Gothenburg

Sailing career
- Sport: Sailing
- Club: GKSS
- Class: 6 Metre
- Updated on 18 March 2015

Oskar Yngve Ludvig Lindqvist (1897–1937) was a sailor from Sweden, who represented his country at the 1928 Summer Olympics in Amsterdam, Netherlands.

== Sources ==
- "Yngve Lindqvist Bio, Stats, and Results". Olympic Sports. Sports Reference. Archived from the original on 17 April 2020.
