= Norm Robertson =

Canadian sailor

Personal information
- Full name: Norman McGregor Robertson
- Born: August 26, 1897 Hamilton, Ontario, Canada
- Died: November 14, 1975 (aged 78)

Sailing career
- Sport: Sailing
- Class: French National Monotype 1924
Competition record
Sailing
Representing Canada
Olympic Games
1924 Meulan	Monotype class
- Updated on 6 March 2015

Norman McGregor Robertson (August 26, 1897 – November 14, 1975) was a sailor from Canada, who represented his country at the 1924 Summer Olympics in Meulan, France.

== Sources ==
- "Norm Robertson Bio, Stats, and Results". Olympic Sports. Sports-Reference.com. Archived from the original on 18 April 2020.
- Les Jeux de la VIIIe Olympiade Paris 1924:rapport official (PDF) (in French). Paris: Librairie de France: Comité Olympique Français. 1924. Archived from the original (PDF) on 21 April 2013.
