= Sailing at the 1928 Summer Olympics – 6 Metre =

6 Metre at the Games of the IX Olympiad
- Line drawing of the 6 Metre
- Venue: Zuiderzee
- Dates: First race: 2 August 1928; Last race: 9 August 1928
- Competitors: 61 Male from 13 nations
- Teams: 13

Medalists
1st place, gold medalist(s)		Johan Anker, Erik Anker, Håkon Bryhn, Crown Prince Olav	Norway
2nd place, silver medalist(s)		Vilhelm Vett, Niels Otto Møller, Aage Høy-Petersen, Peter Schlütter	Denmark
3rd place, bronze medalist(s)		Nikolai Vekšin, William von Wirén, Eberhard Vogdt, Georg Faehlmann, Andreas Faehlmann	Estonia

The 6 Metre was a sailing event on the Sailing at the 1928 Summer Olympics program in Amsterdam. Seven races were scheduled. 61 sailors, on 13 boats, from 13 nations competed.

== Race schedule ==
●	Event competitions	●	Event finals

Date	August							
Date	2nd Thu	3rd Fri	4th Sat	5th Sun	6th Mon	7th Tue	8th Wed	9th
6 Metre	●	●	●	●	Spare day	●	●	●
Total gold medals								1

== Course area and course configuration ==
For the 6 Metre the used courses were about 5 nm out of the locks, East of the Isle of Marken on the Zuiderzee.

At that time the Zuiderzee had an open connection with the North Sea. The sea water was salt or at best brackish. Waves could be steep and short due to the shallow waters.

1928 Olympic Course Areas

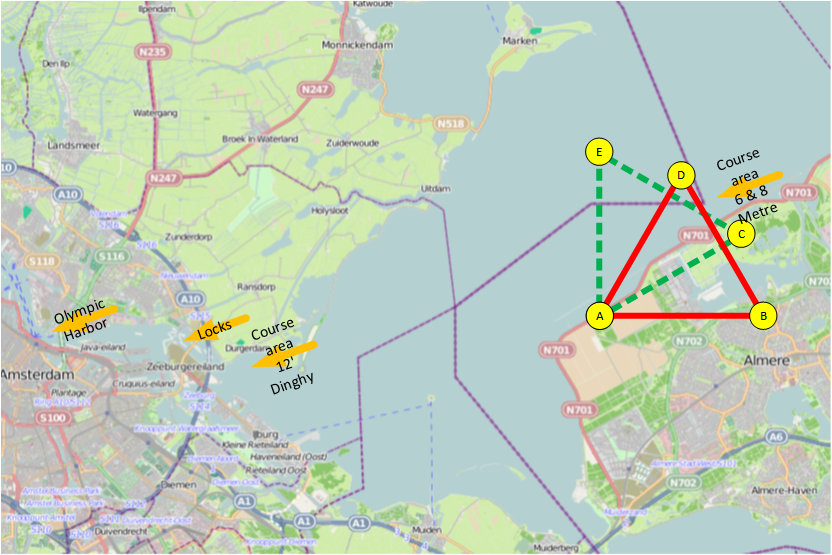
Course area and courses for the 6 Metre

== Weather conditions ==
Date	Race	Wind speed	Wind direction
2-AUG-1928	1st Race	7 knots (3.6 m/s) - 10 knots (5.1 m/s)	
3-AUG-1928	2nd Race	8 knots (4.1 m/s) - 11 knots (5.7 m/s)	
4-AUG-1928	3rd Race	11 knots (5.7 m/s) - 17 knots (8.7 m/s)	
5-AUG-1928	4th Race	13 knots (6.7 m/s) - 21 knots (11 m/s)	
7-AUG-1928	5th Race	8 knots (4.1 m/s) - 11 knots (5.7 m/s)	
8-AUG-1928	6th Race	10 knots (5.1 m/s) - 13 knots (6.7 m/s)	
9-AUG-1928	7th Race	10 knots (5.1 m/s) - 15 knots (7.7 m/s)	

== Results ==
The 1928 Olympic scoring system was used.

=== Final results ===
Rank	Country	Helmsman	Crew	Sail No.	Boat	Race 1		Race 2		Race 3		Race 4		Race 5		Race 6		Race 7		Total
Rank	Country	Helmsman	Crew	Sail No.	Boat	Pos.	Pts.	Pos.	Pts.	Pos.	Pts.	Pos.	Pts.	Pos.	Pts.	Pos.	Pts.	Pos.	Pts.	Total
1st place, gold medalist(s)	Norway	Johan Anker	Erik Anker; Håkon Bryhn; Crown Prince Olav	N 31	Norna	1	Q	1	Q	12	RET	1	Q	2		2		7	DNS	3 x 1st
2nd place, silver medalist(s)	Denmark	Vilhelm Vett	Aage Høy-Petersen; Niels Otto Møller; Peter Schlütter	D	Hi-Hi	11		3	Q	12	DSQ	6		6		1		1		2 x 1st
3rd place, bronze medalist(s)	Estonia	Nikolai Vekšin	William von Wirén; Eberhard Vogdt; Georg Faehlmann; Andreas Faehlmann	C 10	Tutti V	6		6		2	Q	3	Q	1		3		3		1 x 1st 1 x 2nd
4	Netherlands	Hans Pluijgers	Hans Fokker; Carl Huisken; Wim Schouten; Roeffie Vermeulen	H 11	Kemphaan	8		5		1	Q	4		7		7		5		1 x 1st
5	Belgium	Armand Fridt	Ludovic Franck; Frits Mulder; Willy Van Rompaey; Arthur Sneyers	B 7	Ubu	9		2	Q	3	Q	2	Q	4		4		4		2 x 2nd
6	United States	Herman Whiton	Frederick Morris; Conway Olmstead; Willets Outerbridge; Jim Thompson	US	Frieda	3	Q	4		12	RET	5		5		5		2		1 x 2nd 1 x 3rd 1 x 4th
7	Sweden	Hakon Reuter	Harry Hanson; Georg Lindahl; Yngve Lindqvist	S 35	Ingegerd	2	Q	8		5		7		3		6		6		1 x 2nd 1 x 3rd
8	France	Philippe de Rothschild	Henry Allard; Robert Gufflet; Pierre Moussié; Jean Pierre Rouanet	F 13	Cupidon Viking	4		9		4		11								2 x 4th
9	Germany	Ernst Laeisz	Anton Huber; Hans Paschen; Oswald Thomsen; Carl Wentzel	G	Pan	5		11		7		10								1 x 5th
10	Italy	Giovanni Leone Reggio	Francesco Cameli; Giuliano Oberti; Massimo Oberti; Giacomo Tarsis	I	Twins II	7		13	RET	6		9								1 x 6th
11	Hungary	János Mihálkovics	Sándor Burger; Tibor Heinrich von Omorovicza; Sándor Sebők; Miklós Tuss	M	Hungaria	10		7		12	RET	8								1 x 7th
12	Portugal	Frederico Burnay	Carlos Eduardo Bleck; António de Herédia; Ernesto Mendonça	P 1	Camelia	13		12		8		12								1 x 8th
13	Spain	Pedro José de Galíndez	José María, Count de Arteche; Álvaro de Arana; Javier de Arana; Luis de Arana	E	Fruits	12		10		13	DNS	13	DNS							1 x 10th

Legend: DNS – Did not start; DSQ – Disqualified; Q – Qualifying race; RET – Retired;

=== Daily standings ===
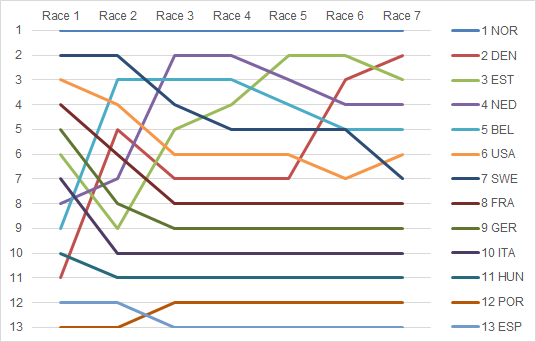
Graph showing the daily standings in the 6 Metre during the 1928 Summer Olympics

== Notes ==
- For this event one yacht from each country, manned by 5 amateurs maximum (maximum number of substitutes 5) was allowed.
- This event was a gender independent event. However it turned out to be a man's only event.

== Other information ==
During the Sailing regattas at the 1928 Summer Olympics among others the following persons were competing in the various classes:

6 Metre sailors at the 1928 Olympic Games
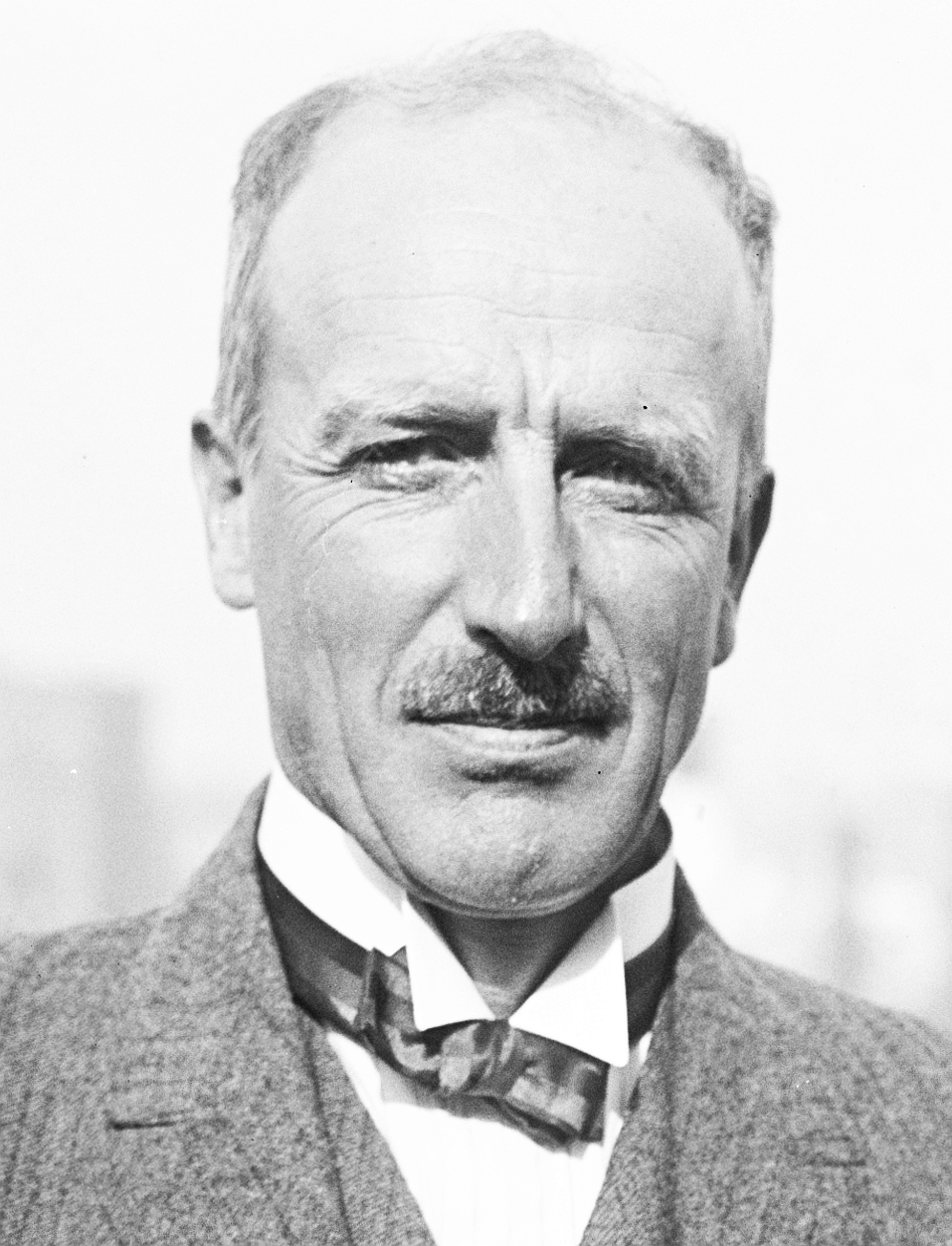
Johan Anker (NOR)

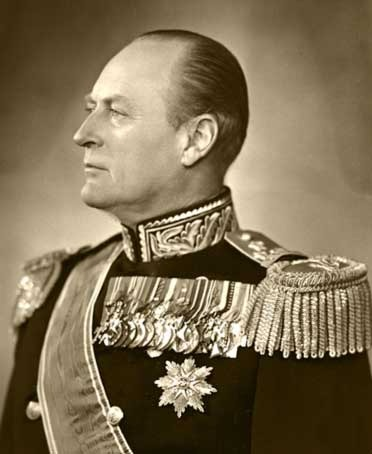
Olav V of Norway (NOR)

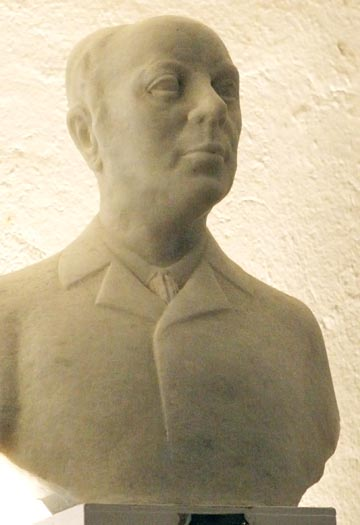
Philippe de Rothschild (FRA)

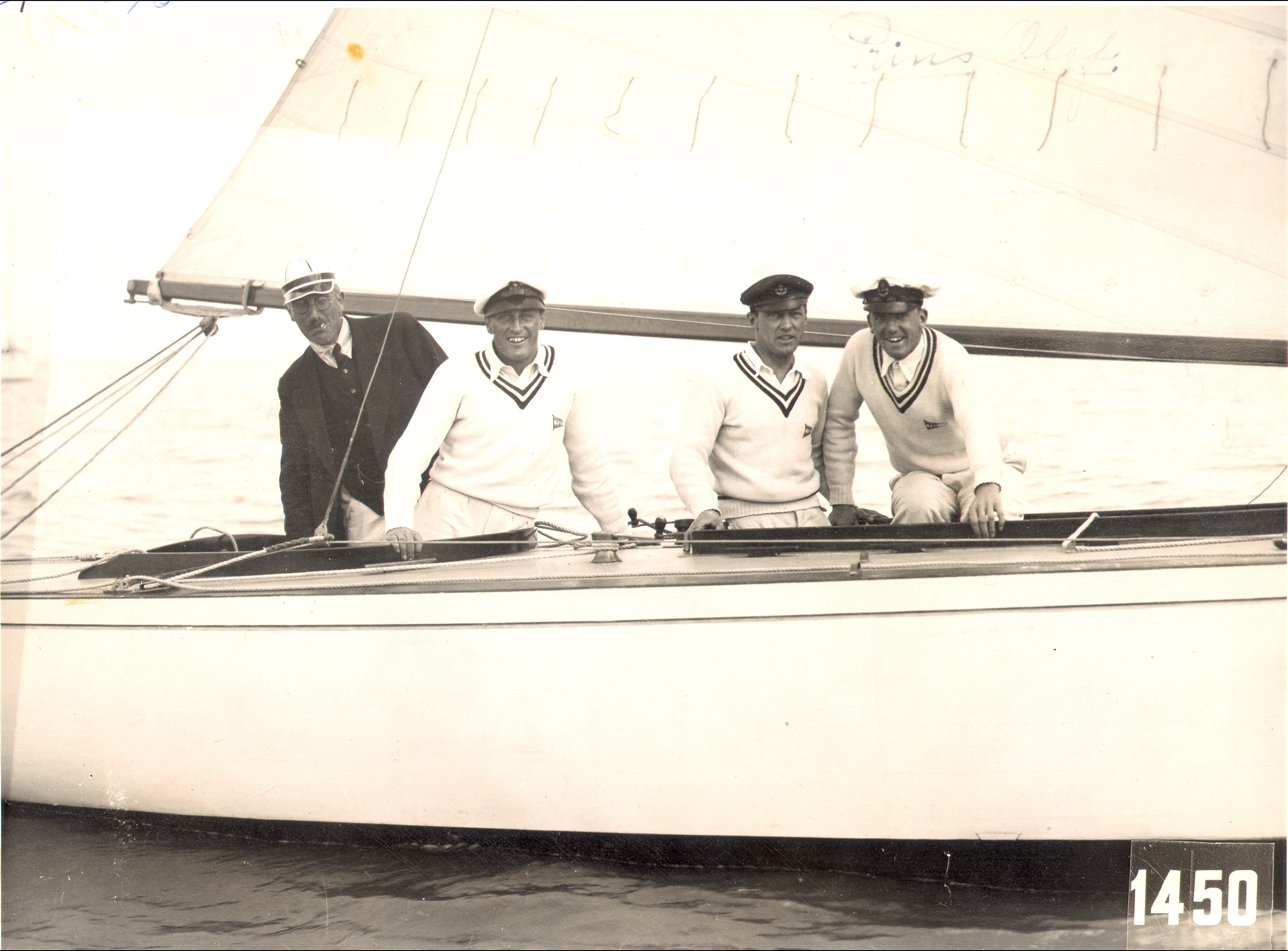
The Victors: Team Norna (NOR)
