= Ernst Laeisz =

German sailor

Personal information
- Full name: Ernst F. Laeisz
- Nationality: German
- Born: 25 December 1888
- Died: 17 January 1958 (aged 69) Feldafing

Sport

Sailing career
- Class: 6 Metre
- Club: Norddeutscher Regatta Verein
- Updated on 18 March 2015

Ernst F. Laeisz was a sailor from Germany, who represented his country at the 1928 Summer Olympics in Amsterdam, Netherlands.

== Sources ==
- "Ernst Laeisz Bio, Stats, and Results". Olympic Sports. Sports-Reference.com. Archived from the original on 2 April 2015.
