= Conway Olmstead =

American sailor

Personal information
- Full name: Conway H. Olmstead
- Nationality: American
- Born: 28 October 1907
- Died: 20 June 1989 (aged 81) Lake Forest

Sport

Sailing career
- Class: 6 Metre
Competition record
Sailing
Representing United States
Olympic Games
6th	1928 Amsterdam	6 Metre
- Updated on 18 March 2015

Conway H. Olmstead (1907–1989) was a sailor from the United States, who represented his country at the 1928 Summer Olympics in Amsterdam, Netherlands.

== Sources ==
- "Conway Olmstead Bio, Stats, and Results". Olympic Sports. Sports-Reference.com. Archived from the original on 4 July 2017.
