= Peter Schlütter =

Danish sailor (1893–1959)

Personal information
- Nationality: Danish
- Born: 25 November 1893 Copenhagen, Denmark
- Died: 6 April 1959 (aged 65) Copenhagen, Denmark

Sailing career
- Sport: Sailing
- Club: Royal Danish Yacht Club
- Class: 6 Metre
Medal record
Sailing
Representing Denmark
Olympic Games
Silver medal – second place	1928 Amsterdam	6 metre class

Peter Schlütter (25 November 1893 – 6 April 1959) was a Danish sailor who competed in the 1928 Summer Olympics.

In 1928 he won the silver medal as crew member of the Danish boat Hi-Hi in the 6 metre class competition.
