= Ernesto Mendonça =

Portuguese sailor

Personal information
- Full name: Ernesto Vieira de Mendonça
- Nationality: Portuguese
- Born: 27 October 1901
- Died: 27 February 1976 (aged 74)

Sport

Sailing career
- Class: 6 Metre
Competition record
Sailing
Representing Portugal
Olympic Games
1928 Amsterdam	6 Metre
- Updated on 18 March 2015

Ernesto Vieira de Mendonça (27 October 1901 – 27 February 1976) was a sailor from Portugal, who represented his country at the 1928 Summer Olympics in Amsterdam, Netherlands and in the O-Jolle event at the 1936 Summer Olympics.

== Sources ==
- "Ernesto Mendonça Bio, Stats, and Results". Olympic Sports. Sports-Reference.com. Archived from the original on 2 April 2015.
