= Oswald Thomsen =

Personal information
- Full name: Oswald Heinrich Thomsen
- Nationality: German
- Born: 20 May 1897
- Died: 1 January 1986 (aged 88)

Sailing career
- Sport: Sailing
- Club: Norddeutscher Regatta Verein
- Class: 6 Metre

Oswald Heinrich Thomsen was a sailor from Germany, who represented his country at the 1928 Summer Olympics in Amsterdam, Netherlands.

== Sources ==
- "Oswald Thomsen Bio, Stats, and Results". Olympic Sports. Sports-Reference.com. Archived from the original on 17 April 2020.
