= Aage Høy-Petersen =

Danish sailor

Personal information
- Nationality: Danish
- Born: 4 November 1898 Ordrup, Denmark
- Died: 29 December 1967 (aged 69) Gentofte, Denmark

Sailing career
- Sport: Sailing
- Club: Royal Danish Yacht Club
- Class(es): Monotype; 6 Metre
Medal record
Sailing
Representing Denmark
Olympic Games
Silver medal – second place	1928 Amsterdam	6 metre
- Updated on 18 March 2015

Aage Høy-Petersen (4 November 1898 – 29 December 1967) was a Danish sailor who competed in the 1924 Summer Olympics and in the 1928 Summer Olympics.

In 1924 he competed in the Olympic Monotype event, but he was not advance to the final. Four years later he won the silver medal as crew member of the Danish boat Hi-Hi in the 6 metre class competition.
