= Álvaro de Arana =

Spanish sailor

Personal information
- Full name: Álvaro de Arana Churruca
- Nationality: Spanish
- Born: 22 June 1887 Bilbao, Spain
- Died: 16 July 1937 (aged 50) Bilbao, Spain

Sport

Sailing career
- Class: 6 Metre

Álvaro de Arana Churruca (22 June 1887 – 16 July 1937) was a Spanish sailor who competed in the 1928 Summer Olympics in Amsterdam, Netherlands. He was killed in action during the Spanish Civil War.
