= Pierre Moussié =

French Olympic sailor (1894–1941)

Personal information
- Nationality: French
- Born: 28 February 1894; Bordeaux, France
- Died: 3 March 1941 (aged 47); Bordeaux, France

Sailing career
- Class: 6 Metre
- Club: Cercle de la Voile d'Arcachon

Pierre Moussié (28 February 1894 – 3 March 1941) was a French sailor who represented his country at the 1928 Summer Olympics in Amsterdam, Netherlands.

== Sources ==
- "Pierre Moussié Bio, Stats, and Results". Olympic Sports. Sports-Reference.com. Archived from the original on 17 April 2020.
