= Niels Otto Møller =

Danish sailor

Niels Møller
Personal information
- Full name: Niels Otto Møller
- Nationality: Danish
- Born: 7 November 1897 Frederiksberg, Denmark
- Died: 14 April 1966 (aged 68) Stevns, Denmark

Sailing career
- Sport: Sailing
- Club: Royal Danish Yacht Club
- Class: 6 Metre
Medal record
Sailing
Representing Denmark
Olympic Games
Silver medal – second place	1928 Amsterdam	6 metre class

Niels Otto Møller (7 November 1897 – 14 April 1966) was a Danish sailor who competed in the 1928 Summer Olympics.

In 1928 he won the silver medal as crew member of the Danish boat Hi-Hi in the 6 metre class competition.
