= Carl Huisken =

Dutch sailor (1902–1987)

Personal information
- Full name: Carl Huisken
- Nationality: Dutch
- Born: 30 July 1902 Amsterdam
- Died: 25 June 1987 (aged 84) Putten

Sport

Sailing career
- Class: 6 Metre
- Updated on 18 March 2015

Carl Huisken (30 July 1902, in Amsterdam – 25 June 1987, in Putten) was a sailor from the Netherlands, who represented his native country at the 1928 Summer Olympics in Amsterdam. Huisken, as crew member on the Dutch 6 Metre Kemphaan, took the 4th place with helmsman Hans Pluijgers and fellow crew members: Hans Fokker, Wim Schouten and Roeffie Vermeulen.

== Sources ==
- "Carl Huisken Bio, Stats, and Results". Olympic Sports. Sports-Reference.com. Archived from the original on 2020-04-18.
- "Zeilen, een bij uitstek Nederlandsche sport. De Olympische wedstrijden ditmaal zeer goed bezet. — Wat zal de wind doen ?" (in Dutch) (Morning ed.). Het volk : dagblad voor de arbeiderspartĳ. 1928-08-02.
- "The Ninth Olympiad Amsterdam 1928:Officiel Report" (PDF). Amsterdam: The Netherlands Olympic Committee. 1928. Archived from the original (PDF) on 2008-04-08.
