= Andreas Faehlmann =

Estonian sailor and aviation engineer

Personal information
- Born: 27 June 1898 Vladivostok, Russian Empire
- Died: 10 April 1943 (aged 44) Bremen, Germany
Medal record
Men's Sailing
Olympic Games
Bronze medal – third place	1928 Amsterdam	6 metre class

Andreas R. Faehlmann (27 June 1898 – 10 April 1943) was an Estonian aviation engineer and yachtsman who competed in the 1928 Summer Olympics.

Andreas Faehlmann was born in Vladivostok, Imperial Russia, as son to Rudolf Faehlmann and Seraphine Sakin. The family returned to Europe in 1900 and settled eventually in Reval, Estonia, his father’s home town, in 1905. Domschule 1912-1915, Garde Marin St Petersburg 1915-1918, Vladivostok 1919-1920.

1922-1923 compulsory Estonian military service. Married Alice Indermitte in 1923 and emigrated to Germany. He began to study aircraft engineering in Frankenhausen, finished the three-year course in two years and was employed by Arado Flugzeugwerke.

In 1933 he joined the Focke-Wulf group as assistant to Kurt Tank as head of their design office. He was, before the war, primarily involved in the design of large passenger aircraft, as the FW 200 for Lufthansa, flying intercontinentally Berlin-New York.

During the war he was responsible for the design of FW ”Stoesser”, FW ”Weihe”, the heavy fighter FW 187, the reconnaissance aircraft FW 189 and the fighter FW 190.

He was, according to his brother Georg Faehlmann, at som time working at Peenemünde (V-1?). A visit to Peenemünde confirms that the Luftwaffe also had a branch for gliders there.

In the 1928 Olympic Games, in Amsterdam, he was a crew member of the Estonian yacht Tutti V, which won the bronze medal in the 6 metre class. His older brother Georg was also a crew member.

Andreas Faehlmann died in Bremen April 10, 1943.

His great granduncle was the distinguished Estonian philologist and physician Friedrich Robert Faehlmann.
