= Tibor Heinrich von Omorovicza =

Hungarian sportsman

Personal information
- Nationality: Hungarian
- Born: 3 November 1898 Budapest, Hungary
- Died: 24 November 1953 (aged 55) Lienz, Austria

Sailing career
- Sport: Sailing
- Club: BKE, Budapest (HUN) / KMYC, (HUN)
- Class: 6 Metre
Competition record
Sailing
Representing Hungary
Olympic Games
1928 Amsterdam	6 Metre
- Updated on 18 March 2015

Tibor Heinrich von Omorovicza (Hungarian: Omoroviczai Heinrich Tibor; 3 November 1898 – 24 November 1953) was a sailor and ice hockey player from Hungary, who represented his country at the 1928 Summer Olympics in Amsterdam, Netherlands and the 1928 Winter Olympics in St. Moritz, Switzerland. He also competed in the O-Jolle event at the 1936 Summer Olympics.
