= Willets Outerbridge =

Personal information
- Full name: Joseph Willets Outerbridge
- Nationality: American
- Born: 22 August 1907 Skaneateles
- Died: 25 December 1978 (aged 71) Oyster Bay

Sailing career
- Sport: Sailing
- Class: 6 Metre
Competition record
Sailing
Representing United States
Olympic Games
6th	1928 Amsterdam	6 Metre
- Updated on 18 March 2015

Joseph Willets Outerbridge (1907–1978) was a sailor from the United States, who represented his country at the 1928 Summer Olympics in Amsterdam, Netherlands.

== Sources ==
- "Willets Outerbridge Bio, Stats, and Results". Olympic Sports. Sports Reference. Archived from the original on 18 April 2020.
