= Hans Paschen =

German sailor

Personal information
- Full name: Hans R. Paschen
- Nationality: German
- Born: 5 February 1896
- Died: 28 May 1960 (aged 64)

Sport

Sailing career
- Class: 6 Metre
- Club: Norddeutscher Regatta Verein

Hans R. Paschen (5 February 1896 – 28 May 1960) was a sailor from Germany, who represented his country at the 1928 Summer Olympics in Amsterdam, Netherlands.

== Sources ==
- "Hans Paschen Bio, Stats, and Results". Olympic Sports. Sports-Reference.com. Archived from the original on 17 April 2020.
