= Hans Pluijgers =

Dutch sailor

Personal information
- Full name: Hendrik Jan Pluijgers
- Nationality: Dutch
- Born: 13 October 1886 Rotterdam
- Died: 7 December 1974 (aged 88) Wassenaar

Sailing career
- Sport: Sailing
- Class: 6 Metre
- Updated on 18 March 2015

Hendrik Jan "Hans" Pluijgers (13 October 1886 in Rotterdam – 7 December 1974 in Wassenaar) was a sailor from the Netherlands, who represented his native country at the 1928 Summer Olympics in Amsterdam. Pluijgers as helmsman on the Dutch 6 Metre Kemphaan took the 4th place with crew members: Hans Fokker, Carl Huisken, Wim Schouten and Roeffie Vermeulen.

== Sources ==
- "Hans Pluijgers Bio, Stats, and Results". Olympic Sports. Sports-Reference.com. Archived from the original on 2020-04-18.
- "Zeilen, een bij uitstek Nederlandsche sport. De Olympische wedstrijden ditmaal zeer goed bezet. — Wat zal de wind doen ?" (in Dutch) (Morning ed.). Het volk : dagblad voor de arbeiderspartĳ. 1928-08-02.
- "The Ninth Olympiad Amsterdam 1928:Officiel Report" (PDF). Amsterdam: The Netherlands Olympic Committee. 1928. Archived from the original (PDF) on 2008-04-08.
