= Freddie Morris =

English footballer

Personal information
- Full name: Frederick Alfred Morris
- Date of birth: 11 March 1920
- Place of birth: Sheffield, England
- Date of death: 1973 (aged 52–53)
- Place of death: Sheffield, England
- Position: Inside forward

Senior career*
Years	Team	Apps	(Gls)
1946–1949	Barnsley	23	(9)
1949–1950	Southend United	38	(16)
1950–1951	Chelmsford City	35	(10)
1951–1954	Worksop Town		
1954–1955	Gainsborough Trinity		

Managerial career
- Worksop Town
- * Club domestic league appearances and goals

Frederick Alfred Morris (11 March 1920 – 1973) was an English footballer who played as an inside forward.

== Career ==
Morris began his professional career at Barnsley. In three years at the club, Morris made 23 league appearances, scoring nine times. In 1949, Morris signed for Southend United, where he scoring 16 times in 38 league games. During his career, Morris made 67 Football League appearances, scoring 25 times.

In 1950, Morris signed for Chelmsford City, where he played at outside left. Following 12 goals in 42 appearances in all competitions for Chelmsford, Morris joined Worksop Town as player-manager in 1951. On 10 August 1954, Morris signed for Gainsborough Trinity. In December 1955, Morris retired from football on medical advice, after suffering from concussion in an FA Cup tie against Skegness Town.
