= Henrik Robert =

Norwegian sailor

Personal information
- Nationality: Norwegian
- Born: 20 March 1887 Hurum, Buskerud, Norway
- Died: 2 September 1971 (aged 84) Asker, Akershus, Norway

Sailing career
- Sport: Sailing
Medal record
Sailing
Representing Norway
Olympic Games
Silver medal – second place	1924 Paris	Monotype class
Silver medal – second place	1928 Amsterdam	12 foot dinghy

Henrik Robert (20 March 1887 – 2 September 1971) was a Norwegian sailor who competed in the 1924 Summer Olympics and in the 1928 Summer Olympics.

In 1924 he won the silver medal in the Olympic monotype event. Four years later he won his second silver medal, this time in the 12 foot dinghy event.
