= Hans Dittmar =

Finnish sailor

Personal information
- Full name: Hans Erik Dittmar
- Nationality: Finnish
- Born: 14 November 1902 Helsinki, Finland
- Died: 20 June 1967 (aged 64) Helsinki, Finland
Medal record
Sailing
Representing Finland
Olympic Games
Bronze medal – third place	1924 Paris	Monotype class

Hans Erik Dittmar (14 November 1902 – 20 June 1967) was a Finnish sailor and olympic medalist. He was born and died in Helsinki.

Dittmar competed at the 1924 Summer Olympics in Paris, where he received a bronze medal in the monotype class. In 1952 he was the helmsman of the Finnish boat Teresita which finished eighth in the 5.5 metre class competition.
