= Sándor Sebők =

Hungarian sailor

Personal information
- Nationality: Hungarian
- Born: 29 April 1898
- Died: August 1952 (aged 54)

Sailing career
- Sport: Sailing
- Club: KMYC, (HUN)
- Class: 6 Metre
Competition record
Sailing
Representing Hungary
Olympic Games
1928 Amsterdam	6 Metre
- Updated on 18 March 2015

Sándor Sebők (29 April 1898 – August 1952) was a sailor from Hungary, who represented his country at the 1928 Summer Olympics in Amsterdam, Netherlands.
