= Giacomo Tarsis =

Olympic sailor (1906–1978)

Personal information
- Nationality: Italian
- Born: Giacomo Edoardo Tarsis di Castel d'Agogna; 9 December 1906 Milan
- Died: 25 October 1978 (aged 71)

Sailing career
- Sport: Sailing
- Class: 6 Metre
Competition record
Sailing
Representing Italy
Olympic Games
10th	1928 Amsterdam	6 Metre
- Updated on 18 March 2015

Giacomo Edoardo Tarsis di Castel d'Agogna (9 December 1906 – 25 October 1978) was a sailor from Italy who represented his country at the 1928 Summer Olympics in Amsterdam, Netherlands.
