= Frederick Morris (sailor) =

Personal information
- Full name: Frederick Wistar Morris, III
- Nationality: American
- Born: August 11, 1905 Wyncote
- Died: November 10, 1971 (aged 66) Plymouth Meeting

Sailing career
- Sport: Sailing
- Class: 6 Metre
Competition record
Sailing
Representing United States
Olympic Games
| 6th | 1928 Amsterdam | 6 Metre |
- Updated on 18 March 2015

Frederick Wistar Morris, III (August 11, 1905 – November 10, 1971) was a sailor from the United States, who represented his country at the 1928 Summer Olympics in Amsterdam, Netherlands.

== Sources ==
- "Frederick Morris Bio, Stats, and Results". Olympic Sports. Sports-Reference.com. Archived from the original on April 2, 2015.
