= A. J. J. Fridt =

Belgian sailor (1899–1969)

Armand Fridt
Personal information
- Nationality: Belgian
- Born: 10 March 1899
- Died: 20 January 1969 (aged 69)

Sport
- Sport: Sailing

Armand Fridt (10 March 1899 – 20 January 1969) was a Belgian rower who competed in the 6 Metre event at the 1928 Summer Olympics. He died on 20 January 1969, at the age of 69.
