= French National Monotype 1924 =

Class of dinghy

Development
- Designer: Gaston Grenier
- Year: 1921

Boat
- Crew: 1
- Draft: 0.31 m (1 ft 0 in), 1.1 m (3 ft 7 in)

Hull
- Type: centerboard 42 kg (93 lb)
- Hull weight: 408 kg (899 lb)
- LOA: 5 m (16 ft)
- Beam: 2 m (6 ft 7 in)

Rig
- Rig type: houari (or Gunter) rig

Sails
- Mainsail area: 15.77 m^{2} (169.7 sq ft)
- Jib/genoa area: 4.4 m^{2} (47 sq ft)
- Spinnaker area: Yes, of unknown size
- Upwind sail area: 20.17 m^{2} (217.1 sq ft)

For the 1924 Olympic Monotype sailing a National Dinghy Class from France was used. Some documents refer to this class as the Meulan and in France as Monotype national. It might originate (or vice versa) as the Scheldejol a Class originated in Antwerp, Belgium and also used in The Netherlands but is a little different at certain measurements. At least more sail area, including a spinnaker and a 10 cm more beam.

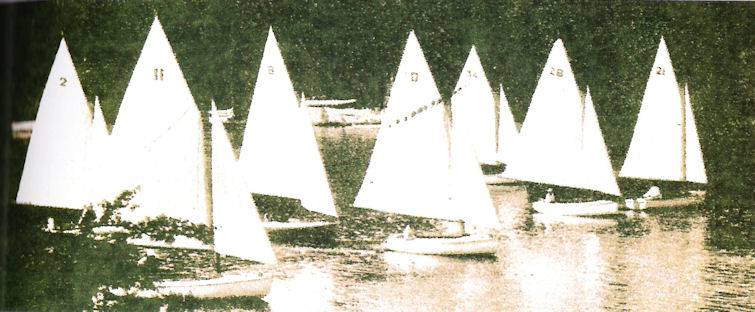

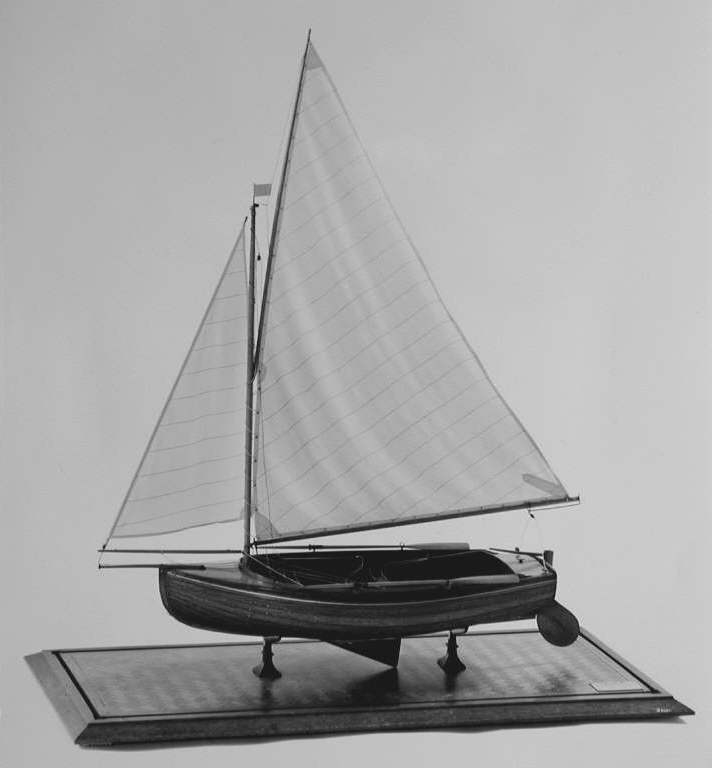
Model of the Scheldejol: Collection Nederlands Scheepvaartmuseum Amsterdam

== Olympic history ==
The competitors at the 1924 Olympics held their regattas at two places:

- One, in the English Channel, of the coast of Le Havre for the 3 persons 6 Metre and the 5 persons 8 Metre and
- Two, at the river Seine near Meulan-en-Yvelines for the single-handed monotype centerboard.

The Olympic International Congress made on December 7, 1921, the decision that the host country would make the choice for the Monotype class. L'Union des sociétés nautiques française (USNF), chooses the French national Monotype of the naval architect Gaston Grenier, especially designed with the Olympic Games of 1924 in mind. A class which emphasizes the qualities of the sailor, whose sailrobe would include a spinnaker, and was adapted to the expected light air conditions.

For the Olympic races 16 Meulans were made available for the 17 sailors. So a rotation scheme had to be used. Ten of the yachts where identical, but the others were little different. It might be worth investigating if these six boats were Scheldejollen and that they were used to accommodate the unexpectedly high number of competitors. The Dutch Wikipedia stated that the Scheldejol was used at the Olympics.

=== Olympic results ===
Games	Gold	Silver	Bronze
1924 Paris	Belgium (BEL); Léon Huybrechts	Norway (NOR); Henrik Robert	Finland (FIN); Hans Dittmar
