= Sailing at the 1952 Summer Olympics =

Sailing at the Games of the XV Olympiad
- Official pin of the 1952 Summer Olympics
- Venues: Harmaja
- Dates: First race: 20 July 1952; Last race: 28 July 1952
- Competitors: 227 from 29 nations
- Boats: 93

Sailing/Yachting is an Olympic sport starting from the Games of the 1st Olympiad (1896 Olympics in Athens, Greece). With the exception of 1904 and the canceled 1916 Summer Olympics, sailing has always been included on the Olympic schedule. The Sailing program of the 1952 Summer Olympics consisted of a total of five sailing classes (disciplines). For each class seven races were scheduled from 20 to 28 July 1952 of the coast of Harmaja.

The sailing was done on the triangular type Olympic courses. The start was made in the center of a set of 8 numbered marks that were places in a circle. During the starting procedure the sequence of the marks was communicated to the sailors. By picking the mark that was most upwind the start could always be made upwind. This system is, at least in certain German lakes, still in use.

== Venue ==
Island Lighthouse Harmaja
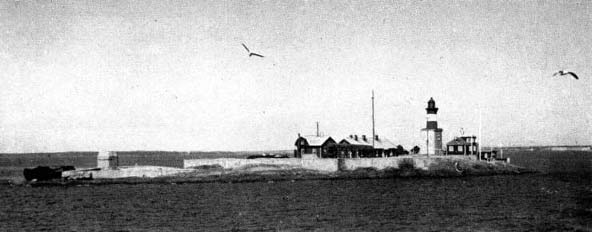
- Interactive map of Island Lighthouse Harmaja
- Coordinates: 60°6′16.88″N 24°58′26.93″E

Liuskasaari Olympic Harbor
- Interactive map of Liuskasaari Olympic Harbor
- Coordinates: 60°9′6″N 24°56′52″E

Two course areas were created in front of Helsinki. One for the Finn just outside the island Liuskasaari. The Finn course was 5.4 nm long and triangular in shape. For the keelboats a course area near the Harmaja lighthouse was used. A 13.1 nm course was set for Star, Dragon, 5.5 & 6 Metre just over one nm South of the lighthouse. Specially the keelboat course was situated in an area of fair sailing conditions. No currents or tidal movements, and no obstacles around the course that could create wind shadows. On the other hand, the Finn course was set near sheltered islands and thus safe for this type of sailing. This course give the spectators also a nice view of the races.

The races were held from 20 to 23 and 26–28 July. In between the sailors could recover or made boat repairs.

Three yacht clubs were involved:

- Nyländska Jaktklubben
- Helsingfors Segelsällskap
- Merenkävijät Yachting Club (also for the prize giving ceremony)

== Competition ==
=== Overview ===
Continents	Countries	Classes	Boats	Male	Female
5	29	5	93	227	3

=== Continents ===
- Africa
- Asia
- Oceania
- Europe
- Americas

== Participating nations ==
- Argentina (14)
- Australia (6)
- Austria (3)
- Bahamas (7)
- Belgium (4)
- Brazil (6)
- Canada (11)
- Cuba (3)
- Denmark (7)
- Finland (14)
- France (9)
- Germany (14)
- Great Britain (14)
- Greece (3)
- Ireland (1)
- Italy (14)
- Japan (1)
- Monaco (2)
- Netherlands (9)
- Norway (11)
- Portugal (9)
- South Africa (4)
- Soviet Union (14)
- Spain (1)
- Sweden (14)
- Switzerland (11)
- United States (18)
- Uruguay (1)
- Yugoslavia (3)

=== Classes (equipment) ===
The 1952 Olympic classes
Class	Type	Event	Sailors	Trapeze	Mainsail	Jib/Genoa	Spinnaker	First OG	Olympics so far
Finn	Dinghy		1	0	+	–	–	1952	1
Star	Keelboat		2	0	+	+	–	1932	4
Dragon	Keelboat		3	0	+	+	+	1948	2
5.5 Metre	Keelboat		3	0	+	+	+	1952	1
6 Metre	Keelboat		5	0	+	+	+	1908	9
Legend: = Male, = Female, = Open
The 1952 Olympic Classes in action Finn Star 5.5 Metre 6 Metre

== Medal summary ==
Event	Gold	Silver	Bronze
1952: Finn	Denmark (DEN); Paul Elvstrøm	Great Britain (GBR); Charles Currey	Sweden (SWE); Rickard Sarby
1952: Star	Italy (ITA); Agostino Straulino; Nicolò Rode	United States (USA); John Price; John Reid	Portugal (POR); Joaquim Fiúza; Francisco de Andrade
1952: Dragon	Norway (NOR); Thor Thorvaldsen; Haakon Barfod; Sigve Lie	Sweden (SWE); Per Gedda; Erland Almqvist; Sidney Boldt-Christmas	Germany (GER); Theodor Thomsen; Erich Natusch; Georg Nowka
1952: 5.5 Metre	United States (USA); Britton Chance; Michael Schoettle; Edgar White; Sumner White	Norway (NOR); Peder Lunde; Vibeke Lunde; Børre Falkum-Hansen	Sweden (SWE); Folke Wassén; Carl-Erik Ohlson; Magnus Wassén
1952: 6 Metre	United States (USA); Herman Whiton; Everard Endt; John Morgan; Eric Ridder; Julian Roosevelt; Emelyn Whiton	Norway (NOR); Finn Ferner; Tor Arneberg; Johan Ferner; Erik Heiberg; Carl Mortensen	Finland (FIN); Ernst Westerlund; Ragnar Jansson; Jonas Konto; Rolf Turkka; Paul Sjöberg

== Medal table ==
Rank	Nation	Gold	Silver	Bronze	Total
1	United States	2	1	0	3
2	Norway	1	2	0	3
3	Denmark	1	0	0	1
3	Italy	1	0	0	1
5	Sweden	0	1	2	3
6	Great Britain	0	1	0	1
7	Finland	0	0	1	1
7	Germany	0	0	1	1
7	Portugal	0	0	1	1
Totals (9 entries)		5	5	5	15

== Remarks ==
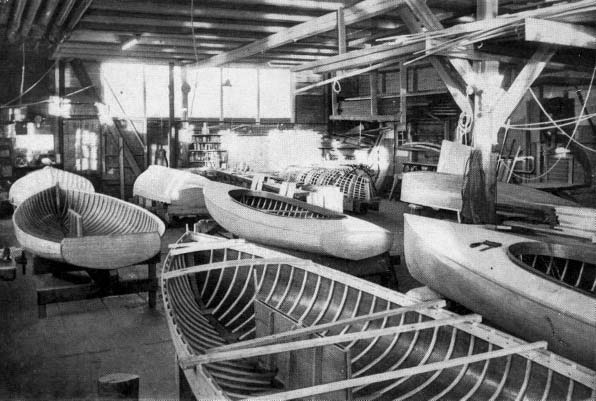
Finn dinghies under construction by Borresens Baadebygger, Denmark

- Sailors from abroad were housed in the homes of Finnish yachtsmen
- Two motor launches accommodated pressmen on the yacht race courses
- Only the Yachting officials wore a different official uniform, blue coat and grey trousers
- The Danish shipyard of Borresens Baadebygger was the builder of all Finn dinghies, since then till the beginning of the 21st century closely committed to Olympic Sailing.

=== Sailors ===
During the sailing regattas at the 1952 Summer Olympics among others the following persons were competing in the various classes:

- Denmark, Paul Elvstrøm in the Finn won his second consecutive Gold medal
- Sweden, Finn sailor Rickard Sarby, also designer of the Finn, injured his right hand during however he took the third place
- Australia, Jock Sturrock in the Dragon. Later skipper of "Gretel" and "Dame Pattie", the first two Australian challenges for the America's Cup.
At the 1952 Olympic Games
Crownprince Olav of Norway, member of the Jury in Helsinki, with Norwegian Dragon sailor Thor Thorvaldsen (right).
