= Sailing at the 1948 Summer Olympics – 6 Metre =

Sailing at the Olympics

6 Metre at the Games of the XIV Olympiad
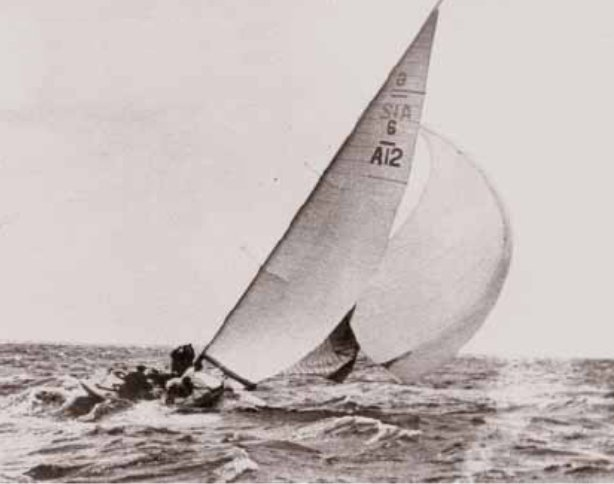
- Silver medalist
- Venue: Torbay
- Dates: 3–12 August
- Competitors: 64 from 11 nations
- Teams: 11

Medalists
1st place, gold medalist(s)		Herman Whiton; Alfred Loomis; James Weekes; James Smith; Michael Mooney	United States
2nd place, silver medalist(s)		Enrique Sieburger, Sr. Emilio Homps; Rufino Rodríguez de la Torre; Rodolfo Rivademar; Enrique Sieburger, Jr. Julio Sieburger	Argentina
3rd place, bronze medalist(s)		Tore Holm; Torsten Lord; Martin Hindorff; Carl-Robert Ameln; Gösta Salén	Sweden

The 6 Metre was a sailing event on the Sailing at the 1948 Summer Olympics program in Torbay. Seven races were scheduled. 64 sailors, on 11 boats, from 11 nations competed.

== Results ==
Rank	Helmsman (Country)	Crew	Yachtname	Race I		Race II		Race III		Race IV		Race V		Race VI		Race VII		Total Points	Total -1
Rank	Helmsman (Country)	Crew	Yachtname	Rank	Points	Rank	Points	Rank	Points	Rank	Points	Rank	Points	Rank	Points	Rank	Points	Total Points	Total -1
1st place, gold medalist(s)	Herman Whiton (USA)	Alfred Loomis; James Weekes; James Smith; Michael Mooney	Llanoria	4	540	1	1142	1	1142	3	665	~~8~~	~~239~~	1	1142	2	841	5711	5472
2nd place, silver medalist(s)	Enrique Sieburger, Sr. (ARG)	Emilio Homps; Rodolfo Rivademar; Rufino Rodríguez de la Torre; Enrique Sieburger, Jr. Julio Sieburger	Djinn	3	665	3	665	3	665	2	841	1	1142	~~4~~	~~540~~	1	1142	5660	5120
3rd place, bronze medalist(s)	Tore Holm (SWE)	Carl-Robert Ameln; Martin Hindorff; Torsten Lord; Gösta Salén	Ali baba II	5	443	2	841	2	841	1	1142	3	665	~~DSQ~~	~~0~~	11	101	4033	4033
4	Magnus Konow (NOR)	Anders Evensen; Lars Skage Musæus; Håkon Solem; Ragnar Hargreaves	Apache	8	239	~~DNS~~	~~0~~	9	188	5	443	2	841	2	841	3	665	3217	3217
5	Howden Hume (GBR)	Douglas Hume; Bonar Hardie; Hamish Hardie; Harry Hunter	Johan	7	297	4	540	~~8~~	~~239~~	7	297	4	540	3	665	4	540	3118	2879
6	Louis Franck (BEL)	Émile Hayoit; Willy Huybrechts; Henri Van Riel; Willy Van Rompaey	Lalage	1	1142	8	239	~~11~~	~~101~~	9	188	5	443	7	297	5	443	2853	2752
7	Henri Copponex (SUI)	André Firmenich; Émile Lachapelle; Charles Stern; Marcel Stern; P. Bonnet; R. Fehlmann; Louis Noverraz	Ylliam VII	2	841	6	364	7	297	4	540	9	188	6	364	~~10~~	~~142~~	2736	2594
8	Giovanni Reggio (ITA)	Renato Costentino; Beppe Croce; Luigi Poggi; Enrico Poggi; Federico De Luca; Giorgio Audizio	Ciocca II	6	364	~~DNS~~	~~0~~	5	443	6	364	7	297	5	443	9	188	2099	2099
9	Ernst Westerlund (FIN)	Rote Hellström; Ragnar Jansson; Adolf Konto; Rolf Turkka; Valo Urho	Raili	9	188	7	297	~~10~~	~~142~~	8	239	6	364	8	239	6	364	1833	1691
10	Troels la Cour (DEN)	Bruno Clausen; Svend Iversen; René la Cour; Hans Sørensen; A. Eiermann; Eyvin Schiøttz	Morena	10	142	5	443	4	540	~~11~~	~~101~~	10	142	10	142	8	239	1749	1648
11	Albert Cadot (FRA)	Jean Castel; Claude Desouches; Robert Lacarrière; François Laverne	La bandera	~~11~~	~~101~~	9	188	6	364	10	142	11	101	9	188	7	297	1381	1280

DNF = Did Not Finish, DNS= Did Not Start, DSQ = Disqualified
= Male, = Female

=== Daily standings ===
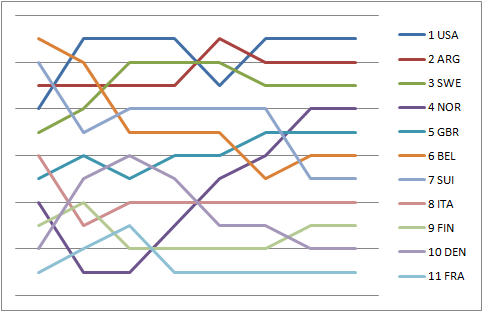
Graph showing the daily standings in the 6 Metre Class during the 1948 Summer Olympics

== Courses at Torbay ==
A total of three race area's was positioned by the Royal Navy in Torbay. Each of the classes was using the same kind of course and the same scoring system.

Race area's at Torbay

Courses at Torbay
