= Sailing at the 1948 Summer Olympics =

Coordinates: 50.4574°N 3.5303°W

Sailing at the Games of the XIV Olympiad
- Sailing symbol of the 1948 Summer Olympics
- Venues: Torbay
- Dates: First race: 3 August 1948; Last race: 12 August 1948
- Competitors: 217 from 23 nations
- Boats: 75

Sailing at the 1948 Summer Olympics in London consisted of a total of five sailing classes (disciplines). For each class, seven races were scheduled from 3‍–‍12 August 1948 Torquay/Torbay, on England's south coast.

The sailing was done on the triangular type Olympic courses. The start was made in the center of a set of 8 numbered marks that were placed in a circle. During the starting procedure, the sequence of the marks was communicated to the sailors. By picking the mark that was most upwind, the start could always be made upwind. This system is, at least in certain German lakes, still in use.

Great Britain's last surviving Gold Medal Champion from the 1948 Summer Olympics was David Bond, who sailed for Great Britain in the Swallow Class.

== Venue ==
As quoted from the official report, "Torquay was, perhaps, an inevitable choice as the venue. It is exposed only to easterly winds, which are rare in summer. Moreover, it is remarkably free from strong tides and currents and other navigational hazards, and thus there is nothing or next to nothing to be gained from the " local knowledge " which is so profitable in difficult waters."

The sailing event a separate opening ceremony which took place in Torquay, due to its distance from London. The opening was made by IOC chairman J. Sigfrid Edström.

A 14 nmi (26 km; 16 mi) course was created for the Dragon and 6 Metre. The Star and Swallow sailed a little more inshore on a 10 nmi (19 km; 12 mi) course, while a 6 nmi (11 km; 6.9 mi) course was set close to the coast for the Firefly.

The closing ceremony was observed by 10,000 spectators. The medals were handed by Sir Ralph Gore, President of the International Yacht Racing Union.

== Competition ==
=== Overview ===
Continents	Countries	Classes	Boats	Male	Female	Reserves
4	23	5	75	221	0	37

=== Continents ===
- Africa
- Oceania
- Europe
- Americas

=== Countries ===
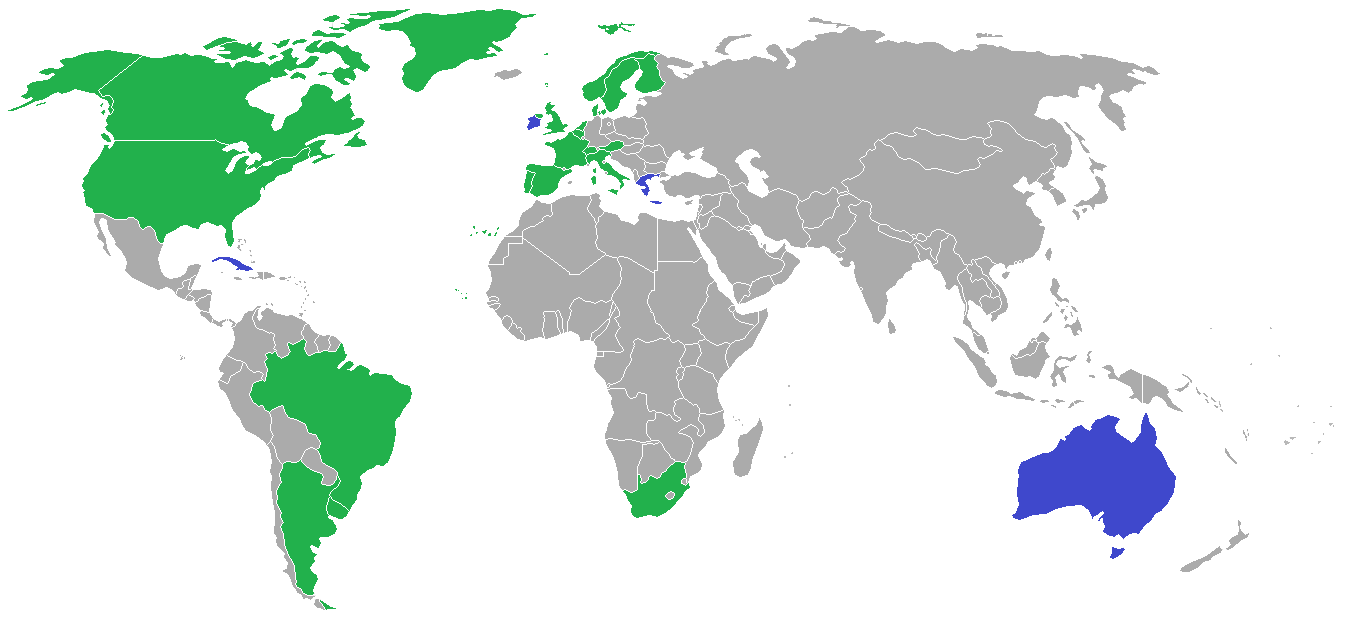
Countries that participated in the Sailing event of the 1948 Olympic Games. Blue: Water Gray: Never participated in OG Dark Gray: Participated in earlier OG Green: Country participated for the first time Dark Blue: Country participated also on previous games Red: Country boycotted the sailing event of the OG

- Argentina (18)
- Australia (3)
- Austria (5)
- Belgium (12)
- Brazil (7)
- Canada (5)
- Cuba (2)
- Denmark (13)
- Finland (12)
- France (16)
- Great Britain (13)
- Greece (4)
- Ireland (5)
- Italy (15)
- Netherlands (8)
- Norway (13)
- Portugal (9)
- South Africa (1)
- Spain (4)
- Sweden (15)
- Switzerland (13)
- Uruguay (4)
- United States (16)

=== Classes (equipment) ===
Prior to 1948, sailing had been a gender-neutral sport where male and female competitors competed together. For the 1948 Games, the IOC decided the events should only be open to male sailors. This was the only time this happened until separate male and female events were introduced in some classes in the 1988 Summer Olympics.

Class	Type	Event	Sailors	Trapeze	Mainsail	Jib/Genoa	Spinnaker	First OG	Olympics so far
Firefly	Dinghy		1	0	+	+	–	1948	1
Star	Keelboat		2	0	+	+	–	1932	3
Swallow (Golondrina)	Keelboat		2	0	+	+	+	1948	1
Dragon	Keelboat		3	0	+	+	+	1948	1
6 Metre	Keelboat		5	0	+	+	+	1908	8

= Male, = Female, = Open

1948 Olympic Classes designs

== Medal summary ==
Event	Gold	Silver	Bronze
1948: Firefly	Denmark (DEN); Paul Elvstrøm	United States (USA); Ralph Evans	Netherlands (NED); Koos de Jong
1948: Star	United States (USA); Hilary Smart; Paul Smart	Cuba (CUB); Carlos de Cárdenas; Carlos de Cárdenas Jr.	Netherlands (NED); Adriaan Maas; Edward Stutterheim
1948: Swallow	Great Britain (GBR); Stewart Morris; David Bond	Portugal (POR); Duarte de Almeida Bello; Fernando Pinto Coelho Bello	United States (USA); Lockwood Pirie; Owen Torrey
1948: Dragon	Norway (NOR); Thor Thorvaldsen; Haakon Barfod; Sigve Lie	Sweden (SWE); Folke Bohlin; Gösta Brodin; Hugo Johnson	Denmark (DEN); William Berntsen; Klaus Baess; Ole Berntsen
1948: 6 Metre	United States (USA); Herman Whiton; Alfred Loomis; Michael Mooney; James Smith; James Weekes	Argentina (ARG); Enrique Sieburger Sr. Emilio Homps; Rodolfo Rivademar; Rufino Rodríguez de la Torre; Enrique Sieburger Jr. Julio Sieburger	Sweden (SWE); Tore Holm; Karl-Robert Ameln; Martin Hindorff; Torsten Lord; Gösta Salén

== Medal table ==
Rank	Nation	Gold	Silver	Bronze	Total
1	United States	2	1	1	4
2	Denmark	1	0	1	2
3	Great Britain	1	0	0	1
3	Norway	1	0	0	1
5	Sweden	0	1	1	2
6	Argentina	0	1	0	1
6	Cuba	0	1	0	1
6	Portugal	0	1	0	1
9	Netherlands	0	0	2	2
Totals (9 entries)		5	5	5	15

== Remarks ==
=== Sailing ===
- Modern techniques like hot-molded plywood in an autoclave, aluminum mast, booms and decks made their entrance in the Firefly.
- The series was scheduled over the two Olympic weeks. Races 1–4 in each class were sailed from 3–6 August. Races 5–7 took place from 10 to 12 August. This was done so that boats could be overhauled after the first set of races.
- Regarding the scoring system, per the official report, "[t]he number of points awarded to each other competitor diminishes under a given formula, according to the placing of his boat at the finish." Advantages of this system are:
  - Winning races is well-awarded, so sailors are likely to fight till the end of the race for each place.
  - Fewer ties than with the point-for-place system.
  - The score of the winner reflects the number of entries.
- Together with the scoring system, it was introduced that each team could discard its worst result.
- The courses were laid and patrolled by vessels of the Royal Navy.

=== Sailors ===
During the Sailing regattas at the 1948 Summer Olympics, the following people (among others) competed in the various classes:

- Rickard Sarby (SWE), the future designer of the Finn.
- Jean-Jacques Herbulot (FRA), the future designer of the Vaurien and the Herbulot spinnaker.
- Agostino Straulino (ITA), who won eight consecutive European championships in the starboat class between 1949 and 1956.
- Enrique Sieburger Sr. (ARG), the oldest of the Sieburger-Salas "clan", a family that had 20 total entries in Olympic Sailing competitions.
- Tore Holm (SWE), a two-time gold and silver medalist in the 6 Metre.
- Magnus Konow (NOR), spanned the longest period in Olympic sailing (1908–1948), in the 6 Metre.
- Paul Elvstrøm (DEN), who, although he did not finish the first race, won his first of four consecutive gold medals in the Firefly.
- Jock Sturrock (AUS), who became the first Australian to sail in the Olympic Games.
