= Sailing at the 1948 Summer Olympics – Swallow =

Sailing at the Olympics

Swallow at the Games of the XIV Olympiad
- Gold medalist
- Venue: Torbay
- Dates: 3–12 August
- Competitors: 38 from 12 nations
- Teams: 12

Medalists
1st place, gold medalist(s)		Stewart Morris; David Bond	Great Britain
2nd place, silver medalist(s)		Duarte de Almeida Bello; Fernando Pinto Coelho Bello	Portugal
3rd place, bronze medalist(s)		Lockwood Pirie; Owen Torrey	United States

The Swallow was a sailing event on the Sailing at the 1948 Summer Olympics program in Torbay. Seven races were scheduled. 38 sailors, on 14 boats, from 14 nations competed.

== Results ==
Rank	Helmsman (Country)	Crew	Yachtname	Race I		Race II		Race III		Race IV		Race V		Race VI		Race VII		Total Points	Total -1
Rank	Helmsman (Country)	Crew	Yachtname	Rank	Points	Rank	Points	Rank	Points	Rank	Points	Rank	Points	Rank	Points	Rank	Points	Total Points	Total -1
1st place, gold medalist(s)	Stewart Morris (GBR)	David Bond	Swift	3	770	1	1247	3	770	1	1247	2	946	~~DSQ~~	~~0~~	4	645	5625	5625
2nd place, silver medalist(s)	Duarte de Almeida Bello (POR)	Fernando Pinto Coelho Bello	Symphony	1	1247	4	645	4	645	~~5~~	~~548~~	1	1247	5	548	1	1247	6129	5579
3rd place, bronze medalist(s)	Lockwood Pirie (USA)	Owen Torrey	Margaret	5	548	9	293	5	548	3	770	~~11~~	~~206~~	1	1247	2	946	4558	4352
4	Stig Hedberg (SWE)	Lars Matton	Change	2	946	3	770	~~14~~	~~101~~	8	344	4	645	12	168	6	469	3443	3342
5	Johan Rathje (DEN)	Naalli Petersen	NN	8	344	7	402	1	1247	9	293	10	247	7	402	~~12~~	~~168~~	3103	2935
6	Dario Salata (ITA)	Achille Roncoroni	Entoria	~~12~~	~~168~~	6	469	10	247	2	946	9	293	4	645	9	293	3061	2893
7	John Robertson (CAN)	Dick Townsend	Scaup	7	402	2	946	2	946	11	206	14	101	~~DSQ~~	~~0~~	11	206	2807	2807
8	Øivind Christensen (NOR)	Knut Bengtson; K. Heje; Oivind Thommessen	Nora	4	645	10	247	12	168	6	469	6	469	3	770	~~13~~	~~133~~	2901	2768
9	Jacques Lebrun (FRA)	Henri Perrissol; Jean Peytel	Red Indian	6	469	5	548	~~11~~	~~206~~	10	247	3	770	9	293	7	402	2935	2729
10	Victorio Walter Dos Reis Ferraz (BRA)	Carlos Borchers	Andorinha	9	293	11	206	9	293	~~12~~	~~168~~	8	344	2	946	5	548	2798	2630
11	Wim de Vries Lentsch (NED)	Flip Keegstra	St. Margrite	DNF	0	~~13~~	^{133}	6	469	4	645	13	133	8	344	3	770	2494	2494
12	Carlos Sáez (URU)	Juan Bidegaray; J. Gamenara	Nortazo	10	247	8	344	7	402	7	402	~~12~~	~~168~~	6	469	8	344	2376	2208
13	Alf Delany (IRL)	Hugh Allen; E. Macnally; David Sullivan	The Cloud	DNF	0	12	168	8	344	13	133	5	548	11	206	~~14~~	~~101~~	1500	1500
14	Gastón Cibert (ARG)	M. Lawrence; Silvio Merlo; Horacio Monti	Antares	11	206	14	101	13	133	~~DNF~~	~~0~~	7	402	10	247	10	247	1336	1336

DNF = Did not finish, DNS= Did not start, DSQ = Disqualified
= Male, = Female

=== Daily standings ===
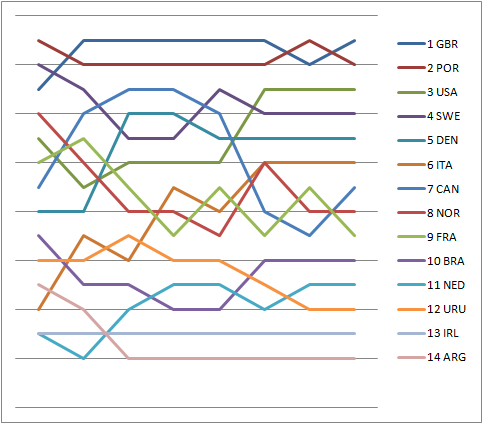
Graph showing the daily standings in the Swallow during the 1948 Summer Olympics

== Courses at Torbay ==
A total of three race area's was positioned by the Royal Navy in Torbay. Each of the classes was using the same kind of course and the same scoring system.
