= Lars Matton =

Swedish sailor

Personal information
- Nationality: Swedish
- Born: 25 December 1924; Gävle, Sweden
- Died: 16 September 2004 (aged 79); Stockholm, Sweden

Sport
- Sport: Sailing

Sailing career
- Class: Swallow
- Club: Gefle SS

Lars Andreas Bertilsson Matton (25 December 1924 – 16 September 2004) was a Swedish sailor. He competed in the Swallow event at the 1948 Summer Olympics together with Stig Hedberg and finished fourth.

Matton was born in Gävle, represented Gefle SS and died in Enskede, Stockholm.
