= Cambridge University Cruising Club =

The Cambridge University Cruising Club (CUCrC) is an early university sailing club founded on 20 May 1893 - some 9 years after the formation of the Oxford University Yacht Club in 1884. A good short history of the CUCrC is available on the club's website. Members' successes in and contribution to sailing are detailed in the Oxford & Cambridge Sailing Society and team racing articles on this site.

In addition, member George Cockshott designed the 'International' 12 Foot Dinghy, which is still raced competitively. Geoffrey Taylor (later Sir Geoffrey) invented the CQR anchor. Stewart Morris founded the Oxford & Cambridge Sailing Society in 1934, and the Society was instrumental in promoting team racing in the UK and internationally. Peter Scott (later Sir Peter) added to his sailing successes by becoming a champion of wildfowl preservation and painting – and also found time to be President of the IYRU (now World Sailing) for 1955–69. Air Commodore Charles Nance (some biographical details are available on the web) played a role in the investigation of rotor ships in the 1980s (see the publication 'Windship Technology'). Ian Walker led the winning team in the 2014/15 Volvo Ocean Race amongst other successes, and now heads yachting development at the UK Royal Yachting Association.

The CUCrC remains a major force in UK team racing, winning the British Universities team racing championships 3 times in 2014-16 and finishing runner-up 3 times in 2017–19.
