= Sailing at the 1952 Summer Olympics – 6 Metre =

6 Metre at the Games of the XV Olympiad
- Medalists
- Venue: Harmaja
- Dates: 20–28 July
- Competitors: 56 from 11 nations
- Teams: 11

Medalists
1st place, gold medalist(s)		Herman Whiton; Eric Ridder; Julian Roosevelt; John Morgan; Emelyn Whiton? (Note: The crew and alternates are from the U.S. Olympic Committee's report, which includes a photograph of "Messrs. Whiton, Ridder, Gubelmann, Roosevelt, and Morgan" at the medal ceremony, and omits Emelyn Whiton from its list of U.S. medalists. The Helsinki Organizing Committee's report lists Emelyn Whiton as a participant, omitting Gubelmann and Merle-Smith altogether.); Everard Endt	United States
2nd place, silver medalist(s)		Finn Ferner; Johan Ferner; Erik Heiberg; Carl Mortensen; Tor Arneberg	Norway
3rd place, bronze medalist(s)		Ernst Westerlund; Paul Sjöberg; Ragnar Jansson; Jonas Konto; Rolf Turkka	Finland

The 6 Metre was a sailing event on the Sailing at the 1952 Summer Olympics program in Harmaja. Seven races were scheduled. 56 sailors, on 11 boats, from 11 nations competed.

== Results ==
Rank	Helmsman (Country)	Crew	Yachtname	Race I		Race II		Race III		Race IV		Race V		Race VI		Race VII		Total Points (Note: The 1952 Olympic scoring system was used.)	Total -1 (Note: Total after applying discard.)
Rank	Helmsman (Country)	Crew	Yachtname	Rank	Points	Rank	Points	Rank	Points	Rank	Points	Rank	Points	Rank	Points	Rank	Points	Total Points	Total -1
1st place, gold medalist(s)	Herman Whiton (USA)	Julian Roosevelt; Everard Endt; John Morgan; Eric Ridder; Alternates: Emelyn Whiton; W. Gubelmann; F. Merle-Smith	Llanoria	4	540	~~9~~	~~188~~	1	1142	1	1142	8	239	3	665	1	1142	5058	4870
2nd place, silver medalist(s)	Finn Ferner (NOR)	Tor Arneberg; Johan Ferner; Erik Heiberg; Carl Mortensen	Elisabeth X	1	1142	4	540	2	841	4	540	~~10~~	~~142~~	1	1142	5	443	4790	4648
3rd place, bronze medalist(s)	Ernst Westerlund (FIN)	Paul Sjöberg; Ragnar Jansson; Jonas Konto; Rolf Turkka	Ralia (Note: The Finnish boat Ralia is the former Swedish boat Ali Baba.)	3	665	6	364	3	665	5	443	1	1142	~~DNS~~	~~0~~	3	665	3944	3944
4	Sven Salén (SWE)	Martin Hindorff; Torsten Lord; Lars Lundström; Carl Robert Ameln	May Be VII	2	841	~~DSQ~~	~~0~~	5	443	3	665	2	841	5	443	4	540	3773	3773
5	Enrique Sieburger, Sr. (ARG)	Rufino Rodríguez de la Torre; Werner von Foerster; Horacio Monti; Hércules Morini	Djinn	6	364	2	841	4	540	6	364	5	443	2	841	~~8~~	~~239~~	3632	3393
6	Louis Noverraz (SUI)	André Firmenich; Charles Stern; François Chapot; Marcel Stern	Ylliam VIII	9	188	1	1142	~~DNF~~	~~0~~	9	188	7	297	6	364	2	841	3020	3020
7	Bill Gooderham (CAN)	Ken Bradfield; Bill Copeland; Bill MacIntosh; Donald Tytler	Trickson VI	8	239	3	665	~~DNF~~	~~0~~	2	841	3	665	8	239	6	364	3013	3013
8	Enrico Poggi (ITA)	Antonio Cosentino; Pietro Reggio; Giusto Spigno; Andrea Ferrari	Ciocca	5	443	5	443	~~7~~	~~297~~	7	297	4	540	4	540	7	297	2857	2560
9	Kenneth Preston (GBR)	Robert Steele; Frank Murdoch; Franklin Woodroffe; Martin Sharp	Titia	7	297	8	239	6	364	8	239	6	364	7	297	~~11~~	~~101~~	1901	1800
10	Wolfgang Elsner (GER)	Hans Kadelbach; Paul-Heinrich Lange; Götz von Mirbach; Andreas Howaldt	Nirwana	~~10~~	~~142~~	7	297	9	188	10	142	9	188	9	188	9	188	1333	1191
11	Nikolay Yermakov (URS)	Kirill Kozhevnikov; Boris Lobashkov; Nikolay Matveyev; Fyodor Shutkov	Circe	~~11~~	~~101~~	10	142	8	239	11	101	11	101	10	142	10	142	968	867

DNF = Did Not Finish, DNS= Did Not Start, DSQ = Disqualified
= Male, = Female

=== Daily standings ===
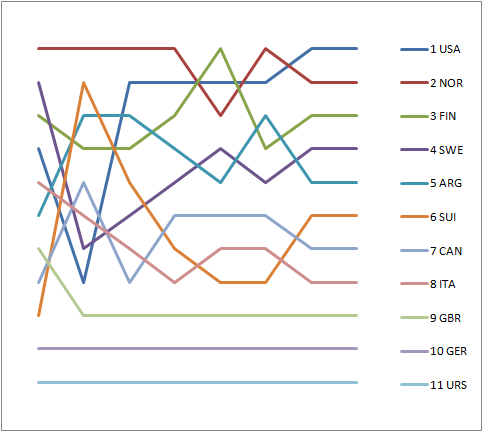
Graph showing the daily standings in the 6 Metre during the 1952 Summer Olympics

== Conditions at Harmaja ==
Of the total of three race area's only two were needed during the Olympics in Harmaja. Each of the classes was using the same scoring system.

Date	Race	Sky	Wind direction	Wind speed (m/s)
20 July 1952	I	Grand yachting weather	SW	6-7
21 July 1952	II	Calm sea, later rain	SW	1-2 later 6-7
22 July 1952	III	Magnificent seas	SW	10
23 July 1952	IV		Shifty	3-4
26 July 1952	V	Rainy	SW	3-6
27 July 1952	VI		SW	4-6
28 July 1952	VII	Fine and sunny	Shifty	Light
