= Michael Mooney (sailor) =

American sailor

Mike Mooney
Personal information
- Full name: Michael Macdonald Mooney
- Nationality: American
- Born: May 14, 1930 New York City, New York, U.S.
- Died: November 18, 1985 (aged 55) Washington, D.C., U.S.

Sailing career
- Sport: Sailing
- Club: Seawanhaka Corinthian YC
- Class: 6 Metre
Medal record
Men's sailing
Representing the United States
Olympic Games
Gold medal – first place	1948 London	6m class

Michael Macdonald "Mike" Mooney (May 14, 1930 – November 18, 1985) was an American sailor and Olympic champion. He was born in New York City, New York and died in Washington, D.C.

He competed at the 1948 Summer Olympics in London, where he won a gold medal in the 6 metre class with the boat Uanoria, together with Herman Whiton, James Smith, Alfred Loomis and James Weekes.
