= Carlos Sáez =

Carlos Sáez may refer to:

- Carlos Sáez Morales (1881–1941), Chilean politician, minister of war
- Carlos Sáez (runner) (Carlos Sáez Sadornil, born 1999), Spanish middle-distance runner
- Carlos Sáez (sailor) (Carlos Alberto Sáez Rossi, 1917–1993), Uruguayan sports sailor
