= Alfred Loomis (sailor) =

American investment banker and sailor (1913–1994)

Lee Loomis
Personal information
- Full name: Alfred Lee Loomis Jr.
- Born: April 15, 1913 Tuxedo Park, New York, U.S.
- Died: September 7, 1994 (aged 81) New York, New York, U.S.

Sailing career
- Sport: Sailing
Medal record
Men's sailing
Representing the United States
Olympic Games
Gold medal – first place	1948 London	6 metre class

Alfred Lee Loomis Jr. (April 15, 1913 – September 7, 1994) was an American investment banker and Olympic sailing champion who won the Bermuda race twice. In 1977, he was manager of the Independence-Courageous syndicate, the yachting team that successfully defended the America's Cup that year.

He competed at the 1948 Summer Olympics in London, where he won a gold medal in the 6 metre class with the boat Llanoria, together with Herman Whiton, James Smith, Michael Mooney, who later married his daughter, Nancy, and James Weekes.

He graduated from Harvard University in 1935 and from Harvard Law School in 1939.

He was the son of Alfred Lee Loomis and Elizabeth Ellen Farnsworth. He was married to the late Virginia Davis and had three daughters, Candace, Nancy, Sabra and a son, Alfred, III.
