= Karen McRae =

Karen McRae was inducted into the Canadian Fourteen Foot Dinghy Hall of Fame by the Canadian Dinghy Association at Royal Canadian Yacht Club Toronto 2013.

McRae participated with the Canadian team in the Sailing World Championships in 1983. She placed Top-5 in the individual competition and was the first woman to skip an International 14 at a World Championship. "My God, she Skips," said Prince Philip, who was in attendance at the 1983 contest held in the UK.

In 1985, McRae helped the Canadian team win the Team Racing World Championship. She also raced in Kingston at the individual World Championship in 1985. Additionally, she was an International 14 CDA Champion (1982, '84 and '86).
