= Hans Sørensen =

Hans Sørensen may refer to:

- Hans Laurids Sørensen (1901–1974), Danish gymnast at the 1920 Summer Olympics
- Hans Christian Sørensen (1900–1984), Danish gymnast at the 1920 Summer Olympics
- Hans Olav Sørensen (born 1942), Norwegian ski jumper
- Hans Peter Sørensen (1886–1962), second Lord Mayor of Copenhagen
- Hans Sørensen (sailor) (1900–1984), Danish Olympic sailor
