= Team racing =

Popular form of dinghy racing and yacht racing

- Highest governing body: World Sailing
- First played: 1913

Characteristics
- Contact: No
- Team members: 2-4 boats
- Mixed-sex: Yes
- Type: Outdoor
- Equipment: Dinghy, Sportsboat
- Venue: Inland or flat inshore waters

Presence
- Olympic: No
- World Championships: 1995
- Paralympic: No

Team racing, also known as team sailing, is a popular form of dinghy racing and yacht racing. Two teams compete in a race, each sailing two to four boats of the same class. The winning team is decided by combining the results of each team's boats. This differs from an inter-club fleet race where boats from three or more clubs compete, with the results of each club's boats combined to determine its overall position.

Team racing uses the low-points scoring system, in which the boat finishing 1st scores 1 point, 2nd scores 2 points, and so on. The scores of all boats on each team are then added together, and the team scoring fewest points wins. Additional rules applied to decide ties in the 2 and 4-boat formats.

Short 6 to 10 minute courses are used for team races. One course form is a digital 'S' on its side, sometimes called a digital 'N'. This gives a beat from start and mark to starboard; a short reach and mark to starboard; a run and mark to port; a short reach and mark to port; and a beat to finish. The other form is a starboard hand 'box'. This gives a beat from start/finish; a short reach, a run; a short reach; and a beat to start/finish. These course formats put a premium on racing tactics so that the outcome is not decided by boat speed alone.

On-the-water umpiring has become the standard since its first introduction in 1987. After an infringement, a boat voluntarily perform one penalty turn. However, if it continues sailing and is subsequently penalised by an umpire, it must complete two penalty turns instead.

== History of Team Racing in the US, UK, and Ireland - First Events ==
Inter-club fleet racing and team racing of a kind has existed as long as yacht racing itself. The earliest recorded regular 'modern' team racing event, with just two teams of two, three, or four boats battling it out over several races, is the Oxford-Cambridge Varsity Match. between the Cambridge University Cruising Club (CUCrC) and the Oxford University Yacht Club (OUYC). The match was first sailed as a two-a-side team race in 1913 and again in 1914 (1913 at Oxford - they won, 1914 at Ely - Cambridge won). The first sailing contest between the two Universities actually took place in 1912 - as three match races at Ely (Cambridge won 2-1). After World War I team racing recommenced (two boats a side) in 1920 on the neutral waters of Oulton Broad in Norfolk, when Oxford won. It has continued annually at locations around the UK, usually on the coast and three boats a side since the mid 1930s.

In addition, an annual team racing contest (two boats a side) between the colleges of Cambridge has been held since 1924, and a similar competition has been held at Oxford since 1926. The first recorded international team racing event was the British-American Cup series in Six-Metres (4 boats a side). It was first sailed in 1921 at Cowes, as a result of a UK challenge, and the UK won 4-3. The series was hotly contested every two years, particularly pre-World War II. It ceased in 1955, when the US won 4-0 yet again, because costs escalated and interest declined due to the class losing Olympic status in 1952.

== American Universities ==
In the US what is now the US Inter-Collegiate Sailing Association (ICSA) was established in 1930 as the ICYRA. Collegiate dinghy sailing in the US blossomed in 1934–36 with initiatives taken by Princeton with its 'Tiger' dinghies (1934), MIT (the famous Pavilion was founded and built in 1935 at the instigation of Walter C. 'Jack' Wood), and Brown (1936). The initial emphasis of the ICSA was very much on fleet racing (see Inter-Collegiate Sailing Association for historical details), but during the 1930s, team racing between individual colleges started to emerge - with 2 to 4 colleges meeting up, each fielding 2 to 5 boats.

After World War II collegiate sailing spread across the US and parts of Canada, with ICSA membership rapidly growing to modern numbers. George O’Day (Harvard), Harry Anderson (Yale) and Bill Cox Sr. (Princeton) all helped develop the ICYRA team race rules in the 1940s, and these were the forerunners of the NAYRU (now US Sailing) and International Yacht Racing Union (later International Sailing Federation or ISAF, now World Sailing) team race rules. (International harmonisation of the Racing Rules of Sailing did not take place until 1960.)

A regional team racing championship, four-a-side format, first took place in 1950 in the New England District (now 'Conference') for the Leonard M. Fowle Trophy - a separate trophy from the new Fowle Trophy that is awarded to the best college across all 6 national ICSA championships. National team racing for the Walter C. Wood Trophy, four-a-side format, commenced in 1960 between teams formed from colleges within a particular ICSA district or 'conference', and results from 1970 are available online From 1977 competing teams have been limited to sailors from one college, and Rhode Island University was the first (1977) winner of the current 'individual college' team racing championship for the Wood Trophy. The Wood Trophy now runs on a three-a-side format because of the greater ease of accommodating 6 sailors in the one car! Across the border in Canada, intercollegiate sailing has also grown strong since the late 1990s. Courses evolved to current formats in the 2000s.

== British Universities ==
The first recorded UK team race between universities, other that Oxford vs Cambridge, was a match between Cambridge and United Hospitals in 1935, which United Hospitals (UH) won. Cambridge medics had to do their clinical training in London until 1976, so there were several ex-Cambridge sailors on the UH team. The first recorded team races against other colleges were in 1947 (University College, London), 1948 (Imperial College, London), 1949 (Trinity College, Dublin), and 1950 (London University) - all won by Cambridge. In 1956 the Association of Northern Universities Sailing Clubs (ANUSC) had been in existence for a few years and was already running its own (Northern) team racing championship. London was invited to the 1956 event, providing further impetus to the founding of BUSA (see next paragraph), in which London played a major role.

The UK equivalent of the ICSA, the British Universities Sailing Association (BUSA), was founded in 1957, partly at the suggestion (in a 'Longshoreman' article) by Michael Ford of the Oxford University YC team that had toured the US in 1954, initiating what is now the biennial ICSA - BUSA team racing tour, which alternates between the two countries. BUSA focused solely on team racing in its early years, fostering international student team racing, and later widened its interest to dinghy fleet racing, 'big boat' yachting (currently in Sunsail F40s), and keel boat match racing.

The first UK universities team racing championships was held in 1957 and has taken place annually since then, three-a-side format. The 1957 knock-out event for what is now the Thompson Trophy took place on the Welsh Harp (Brent Reservoir in London) and was won by London University from an entry of 14 teams. Partly because of the influence of Oxford and Cambridge team racing, universities in the UK had sailed individual team racing matches up until that time, or had participated in local contests of three or four teams. There was no fleet racing comparable to North American practice.

Dinghy racing at Oxford started in the 1880s, at Cambridge in the 1890s, and has continued at both universities without interruption to the present day. Cambridge also held a one-week coastal 'Marine Meeting' event for dinghies, and for larger craft in pre-WWII years. It ran from 1903 to 1966, interrupted only by the two World Wars. Oxford held a similar event for dinghies between 1946 and the 1970s. London University colleges were active in sailing from the late 1920s onwards, along with United Hospitals. Furthermore, London was a major force in UK university team racing in the 1950s and 60s - winning 5 of the first 8 championships.

In part, Oxford-Cambridge team racing rivalry resulted in the formation of the Oxford & Cambridge Sailing Society (O&CSS) by Stewart Morris in 1934 to promote team racing in the UK. Other influences were concern at the 'thrashing' (4-0) of the British Six-Metre team in the 1932 British-American Cup series, and the interest in team racing being generated by the International 14 Dinghy Class (and its Canadian variants) from 1926 onwards. The O&CSS was successful in its aims, later helping West Kirby SC (near Liverpool) to arrange a single-class open team racing championship in 1949, under the title 'North West Firefly Championship'. The event, for what was then a very large entry of 17 teams (three-a-side format), used Firefly dinghies conveniently available after the 1948 London and Torquay Olympics. Itchenor SC from Chichester Harbour won this first knock-out event by beating the O&CSS in the final.

== Wilson Trophy / North West of England Firefly Championship / Irish Team Racing ==
So began, as mentioned in the last paragraph of the preceding section, what became the famous Wilson Trophy, which remains a leading international team racing event.

The West Kirby initiative was triggered by the results of a joint Irish Dinghy Racing Association (IDRA) and Royal St George YC team racing event held in Dun Laoghaire, Ireland in 1948 (three-a-side format). This was the first team racing event in Britain and Ireland to have national rather than very local entry, but it still made use of several dinghy classes, including the Firefly, because of the shortage of dinghies of one particular class. Royal St. George YC won the event in September 1948, but was almost defeated by the relatively unknown West Kirby team in the final. One of the West Kirby team, (Sir) Cyril Clarke, was a member of the Oxford & Cambridge Sailing Society, and he and the other two helmsmen (Harry Dennis and Glyn Evans) resolved to run a similar event at West Kirby the following year.

After the 1948 Irish event, Dun Laoghaire and its three yacht clubs (Royal St George YC, Royal Irish YC, National YC) became hosts to an Irish equivalent of the Wilson Trophy, known as the Sean Hooper Trophy, which facilitated considerable British-Irish university and club team racing. Since the 1980s the event has been hosted by the Royal St. George YC alone.

== International 14 Class Team Racing ==
As mentioned earlier, the International 14 Class has always had a great interest in team racing. The first recorded team race took place in 1926 when Trent SC challenged the Royal Norfolk & Suffolk YC to a three-a-side match in National 14s (international status was not granted until 1928), so initiating the Trent Inland Waters Challenge Cup. The first international team racing event (three-a-side format), between Canada, the US (two teams from Long Island and Rochester), and the UK took place in 1933 at Seawanhaka Corinthian YC, Oyster Bay, New York and was won (narrowly) by the UK. This, which seems to have been the first recorded international dinghy team racing event, was followed up in 1934 by a second event (four-a-side format from now on) at the Royal Canadian YC, Toronto, when the UK lost just one race - to Canada. After 1934, an international team racing event was held every two years, interrupted by World War II from 1940 to 1958.

In the 1934 event, three of the four UK helmsmen were members of the O&CSS (Stewart Morris - founder of the O&CSS, Peter Scott, John Winter), and the very close relationship between the 14's, the O&CSS, and team racing continues. Four-times World Champion, Archie Massey, is a member of the O&CSS, and the Class still holds an international team racing event before its biennial World Championships.

== Other International Class Team Racing ==
In 1983 the International Optimist Class (for juniors under 16) introduced team racing at its World Championships, and four-a-side team racing takes place at its national, regional and world championships. At the 2022 World Championship 48 national teams participated with the U.S.A team winning over Ukraine in the final. Since 2008 a separate European Team Racing Championship is held in Ledro for the top sixteen European national teams.

In 2015, after two early events in 2005 and 2006, the International 420 Class initiated a youth (under 21) international team racing championship, separate from its other championships, in three-a-side format.

== National UK Team Racing ==
The Wilson Trophy at West Kirby SC has remained the annual pinnacle of team racing in the UK and, to some extent, the world - with teams coming from the United States, Germany, and other countries as team racing interest spread internationally. Team racing interest grew in the UK in the 1970s and early 1980s when the Royal Yachting Association (RYA) organised an inter-club team racing championship. This first National Team Racing competition in Britain and Ireland in 1969 had 260 teams entered, with West Kirby winning the Prince Philip Trophy at Farmoor Reservoir (hosted by Oxford SC). By the next year, 1970, the number of entries increased to 352 clubs. The event divided the country into various zones, with 2 teams from each zone qualifying for a National Final. The competition was sponsored at different times by Little Ship (later British) Paints and Dunhill/Rothmans, and was encouraged by HRH Prince Philip, Duke of Edinburgh, who attended some of the National Finals.

After the event lost its sponsorship in 1982 it ceased for a time, and there was some decline in club interest in team racing in the UK, though not in universities, where it continued to be strong - nor at West Kirby, where the Wilson Trophy continued with unabated enthusiasm. On-the-water umpiring for team racing was pioneered by West Kirby at the 1987 Wilson Trophy, with the first 'On The Water Adjudicators' being Tony Cross, Ian Berry and Peter Price (West Kirby), Mike Bailey and John Anstey (Wembley), and Brian Heron (Hollingworth Lake). Peter Price went on to write and present the first codified instructions for "On The Water Adjudication for Team Racing" to the RYA in late 1987, and after many years as an Umpire and Chief Umpire was awarded the status of RYA Umpire Emeritus in 2013.

HRH Prince Philip said of the UK Team Racing Championship in 1969: "I very much hope that this new Team Racing Competition will give a lot of enthusiastic clubs and club members many happy hours of sailing. Team racing demands rather a different approach and different techniques, so this event may well discover new talent. It has the further advantage that teams will be able to travel to other clubs and so experience different conditions and new scenery, if only the clubhouse bar. The races are the important thing of course, but I dare say there will be much to discuss afterwards, and I am sure everyone will enjoy the social side of these encounters."

== National US Team Racing ==
In the US, team racing at a national level, outside inter-collegiate competition, was a little slower to develop. The first national team racing championship for the George R. Hinman Trophy was held in 1981 at Fort Worth, Texas and organised by US Sailing. The winning team was from the Great Lakes region (US Sailing Area E): Terry McLaughlin and Carolyn Brodsky, Jeff Boyd and Peter Jones, Tam Matthews and Jay Cross. The event grew out of a regatta initiated by Sailing World magazine that became so popular it was adopted by US Sailing, and the winner of the event is encouraged to enter the Wilson Trophy in the UK.

The early winners tended to be collegiate teams but, through the influence of Gary Brodie who became Chairman of the Team Racing Championship Committee in 1992, and Brad Dellenbaugh who followed him in 1996, the event now attracts a wide entry, though the presence of post-collegiate sailors remains strong - as it does in UK competitions. The first umpired US Team Racing Championship took place in 1990 at Alameda, California.

== International Championships ==
In 1995, as a result of widespread international interest, the IYRU - later the ISAF and now World Sailing - introduced the Team Racing World Championships. This made team racing (three-a-side format) a firmly established form of dinghy and yacht racing, though dinghy team racing remains strongest in the English-speaking world. Both Australia and New Zealand have active team racing associations, with local and national competitions. The first (1995) ISAF World Championship was held at West Kirby and won by the UK. Since 2005 the biennial ISAF championship has included a youth (under 19) event, first won by the UK.

== UK Team Racing Championships ==
The initiation of the ISAF World Team Racing Championships in 1995 generated greatly increased interest in team racing at the general club level in the UK. The old Prince Philip Trophy from the 1980s was awarded to Spinnaker SC, who won the trials held to select the UK team and went on to win the first World Championship. The trials, the Wilson, and the Worlds were all held at West Kirby that year, with 'world' teams barred from entering the Wilson. The following year the UK Team Racing Association (UKTRA) was formed. Then, in 1997 the RYA and the UKTRA restarted the UK National Team Racing Championship for the Prince Philip Trophy that had ceased in the early 1980s. The RYA also organises the very popular UK annual Eric Twiname junior (under 16) and youth (under 19) team racing championships. In addition, during almost every week-end of the UK university autumn and winter terms, there are university-organised team racing events, involving between 8 and 16 or more teams.

== UK Schools Team Racing ==
UK schools are also active through the British Schools Dinghy Racing Association. The association caters especially for UK private independent schools, organising annual regional and national team racing championships since 1989. The BSDRA was founded by Nick Prosser of Tonbridge, Crispin Reed Wilson of Bradfield, and Bruce Hebbert of Sevenoaks School - who was also a member of the Oxford & Cambridge Sailing Society. Its competitions are open to state schools and internationally. In 1989 Winchester College won the first BSDRA event for the Whitstable Trophy, and Tabor Academy was the first international winner in 1990. This Tabor success was followed by several USA victors, plus Schull Community College from Ireland. The UK National Schools Sailing Association, which caters especially for the state school sector, runs a national single-handed team racing event in Toppers, and a national double-handed team racing event.

The RYA also runs its own Youth team racing nationals known as the Eric Twiname (ETs). The double handed event has two categories. Junior 'two boat' team racing, which takes place in the RS Feva, and Youth '3 boat' team racing which happens in Fireflies. The event normally takes place at Farmoor reservoir, in Oxford. The event has become increasingly popular, with well over 200 participants and 48 team applicants for the two boat team slots. The 2021 nationals, won by RHS (two boat) and Rutland (three boat), had a limit of 24 teams in each of its categories.

== US Team Racing ==
There are a good many keel boat and other team racing events in the US, such as the Kirby Cup organised by the Sonar Class Association, and the extensive programme of team racing organised by the New York YC. The CJ Buckley Memorial Regatta is a very popular US annual junior (under 19) Club 420 team racing event, held at East Greenwich. The Inter-Collegiate Sailing Association (ICSA) is active in team racing at the district or 'conference' level as well as nationally. The Interscholastic Sailing Association (ISSA) has organised an annual national team racing event, for the Baker Trophy since 1989, when Tabor Academy was the winner. The Baker Trophy also involves regional qualifiers.

The US Sailing Team Racing Committee helps promote team racing in the United States. US Sailing also maintains a master schedule of team racing events in the United States.

== European Keel Boat Team Racing ==
In 2011 Bruce Hebbert, a member of the Oxford & Cambridge Sailing Society, conceived and launched (with help from a number of sailors in the Netherlands, Germany, Monaco, Italy and Spain) a European series of team racing in keel boats (two-a-side format) called '2K'. The series is hotly contested and now takes place in over eight locations across Europe in varying keel boat classes.

== Team Racing Boats ==
Because team racing must be conducted in equal boats the most popular boats for team racing are one-design dinghies or keel boats. The 420, Vanguard 15, Firefly, and Flying Junior are the dinghies most frequently used for team racing. The Sonar, J/24, Maxfun 24, and J/80 are popular team racing keel boats.

In the UK the Firefly, a 12-foot dinghy designed by Uffa Fox, is the most commonly used boat. The Firefly is ideal for team racing because it lacks high-performance features such as spinnaker and trapeze that hinder team racing tactics. It also has good acceleration, is highly manoeuvrable, and is easily handled by women and juniors.

== Team Racing Event Formats and Courses ==
Early team racing events were generally run on a knock-out basis, with a 'first round losers' knock-out competition being introduced later. Most current competitions involve either a 'round robin' or a 'Swiss league' system to arrive at quarter finalists or semi finalists. The Wilson Trophy preliminary rounds run on a Swiss league basis.

When first introduced, team racing followed the then-current patterns of fleet racing courses, often a large triangle with the same start and finish line. Over time the triangle became smaller to encourage more inter boat action. Later, more inter-boat action was achieved by setting starboard hand courses.

Then the so-called 'S' (or 'N') and the 'box' course formats evolved. They are explained in the Introduction at the start of this page. The 'S' format is currently most actively used in Europe.

There is a rumour that the 'S' course exists due to team racing at Spinnaker sailing club, where race officials had to use their course setting abilities creatively in order to avoid the two islands in the middle of the small lake.

== Team Racing Tactics ==
Team racing is a tactical branch of dinghy racing and yacht racing, requiring not only strong boat speed but also precise boat handling, effective teamwork, and a sound understanding of strategies for turning a losing position into a winning one.

Consider the following situation in a 3-boat team race - the most common format. If one boat is in 1st place and its team-mates are in 4th and 6th then the team's points are 1 + 4 + 6 = 11 points, whereas the opposition has 2 + 3 + 5 = 10 points and so is ahead. For its team to win the race, the boat in 4th place will have to slow the 5th boat so that its 6th place team-mate moves up to 5th - it would be dangerous for the boat in 1st place to do anything because of the two opposition boats behind. The 4th boat can make its move, called a 'pass back' conversion, by using the Racing Rules of Sailing (RRS), including the special team racing rules of Appendix D, to position itself in such a way that the opposition has to sail extra distance to keep clear or sail in reduced wind and so lose ground.

There are two main 'moves' in team racing; the 'pass back' and the 'mark trap.' The goal of the pass back, involving three boats sailing upwind, is for the leading boat to slow the next (opposing team's) boat in order for the third boat (of the leading boat's team) to either tack away from the intermediate covering boat, or sail ahead faster than the covering boat. The mark trap is more complicated. It involves one boat stopping at a mark in a position where it can use the RRS to hinder opposing boats rounding the mark, so allowing team-mates to catch up and then sail ahead. Another tactic is for one boat to gybe onto (right of way) starboard tack when close to a downwind mark, forcing boats just behind to do the same and sail considerable extra distance, and so allow team-mates to catch up.

If one boat feels that another has breached the Racing Rules of Sailing in any situation, she may hail "protest". If the protested boat does not exonerate herself with a one-turn penalty the protesting boat may hail "umpire" or, more commonly in the UK, show a red flag. An on-the-water umpire will then make a decision, almost instantly, and impose a two-turn penalty on any boat judged to have broken a rule in the incident.

== Winning and Losing Combinations ==
An experienced team racer will know whether his team is winning or losing at any point in the race. The most common combinations of results are given below. A good crew will be able to tell the helmsman whether the team is winning or losing and advise which position to attack in order to win.

=== 2-boat team racing ===
The team with the last boat loses.

=== 3-boat team racing ===
The rule for winning is 10 points or fewer, which translates to the following detailed rules

- 1-2-anything
- 1-3-anything
- 2-3-4
- 2-3-5
- 1-4-5

=== 4-boat team racing ===
The rule for definitely winning is 17 points or fewer. In the case of a tie with each team scoring 18 points (e.g., 1,2,7,8 vs 3,4,5,6), the team with first place loses. This reflects the fact that the first (and second) place skippers showed poor strategy by finishing when their team was not winning.
