= Bidegaray =

Bidegaray is a surname. Notable people with the surname include:

- Juan Bidegaray (1919–2010), Uruguayan Olympic sailor
- Katherine M. Bidegaray (born 1960), justice of the Montana Supreme Court
- Marcel Bidegaray (fl. 1910s–1920s), general secretary of the Railway Workers' Federation of France
- Pauline Bidegaray (born 1981), French actress
