= Emilio Homps =

Argentine sailor

Medal record

Sailing

Representing Argentina

Olympic Games
Silver medal – second place	1948 London	6 metre class

Emilio Carlos Homps Mulet (September 28, 1914 – November 2, 2012) was an Argentine Olympic sailor who competed at the 1948 Summer Olympics in London. He won a silver medal in the 6 metre class event, alongside teammates Enrique Sieburger, Sr., Rufino Rodríguez de la Torre, Rodolfo Rivademar, Julio Sieburger, and Enrique Sieburger, Jr. Born in San Pedro, Argentina, he was a member of the Yacht Club Olivos and received his Olympic ship, the Djinn, from the Argentine Navy. As a youth, he also swam, rowed, and played rugby union at the national level. In 2006 he was awarded an honorary diploma from the city of Vicente López for his lifelong successes in sport.
