= George Cockshott =

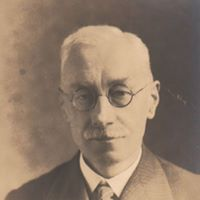
- Born: 7 May 1875; Preston, Lancashire, UK
- Died: 1953 (aged 77–78); Hampshire, UK
- Education: Uppingham and King's College, Cambridge
- Occupation: Solicitor
- Known for: Design of the 'International' 12 Foot Dinghy
- Board member of: Vice-Commodore of Southport Corinthian Yacht Club
- Spouse(s): Mary Eileen Beatrice Kent (b 28 Nov 1985, Wicklow, Ireland)
- Children: John (b 20 Sep 1907), Mason (b 30 May 1910)

Notes
- Member of: Royal Mersey Yacht Club, Southport Corinthian Yacht Club, West Lancashire Yacht Club, and Cambridge University Cruising Club

George Cockshott (7 May 1875 in Preston, Lancashire – 1953 in Hampshire) was born into a legal and sporting family in Southport, where he practised as a solicitor in the family firm of Bucks, Cockshott and Cockshott. His brother Francis was an Athletics Blue in each of his three years at Cambridge as well as working for a time in the family firm. George served as a justice of the peace and was also an active and gifted amateur yacht designer. His claim to fame comes through his design of the 'International' 12 Foot Dinghy. Although the international status of the class was revoked by the IYRU (now World Sailing) in 1964, it is still raced actively across the world. George retired to Hampshire in later years, dying there in 1953.

== Early life ==
George was educated at Uppingham School and King's College, Cambridge. As a boy he took a keen delight in building and sailing model yachts, and while at school built for himself a rowing and sailing boat. He joined the Cambridge University Cruising Club shortly after its formation in 1893. On coming down from Cambridge and commencing practice as a solicitor in the family firm, he spent several seasons as ‘forward hand’ racing in the Southport ¾-rating class and the Menai Straits 1-rating class. In 1906 he married Mary Eileen Beatrice Kent of Wicklow, Ireland (b 28 Nov 1985) and they had two sons.

== Sailing and Yacht Design Activities ==
George owned the Unona, a half decked centre board boat, and designed and sailed for two seasons a boat in a ‘restricted class’ of 12-foot dinghies with a fair measure of success. In 1901 he became owner of the 12 ton cutter Eurynome, a boat long famous as a cruiser-racer in Irish, Clyde and Welsh waters. Although Cockshott preferred cruising to racing and considerably reduced her spars and canvas, she was successfully raced under his flag for several seasons in a strong handicap class. In 1903 he won a "fine silver" trophy, engraved with the name of his boat - Eurynome. The trophy was subsequently renamed the George Cockshott Cup (or Eurynome Bowl) and Cockshott himself presented it to Cambridge University Cruising Club in 1950 so that it could be presented to subsequent winners. The cup remains a perpetual club award.

In 1904, he again entered the ¾-rating class as part owner of Imp. He also owned the yacht Sthoreen, an able and comfortable cruising yawl of 16 tons, built from his own designs, and launched in the spring of 1906. In addition to his own yacht Sthoreen, Cockshott designed one 20 tonner, several smaller yachts and motor launches, and a tender to the Southport lifeboat, all of which were built to his designs. He also designed a new racing class for the West Lancashire Yacht Club in 1906 from which nine boats were built and are now known as the West Kirby Star Class. The five remaining Stars transferred to West Kirby SC in 1922, and the class there has been added to over the years.

== 'International' 12 Foot Dinghy ==
In 1912 Cockshott won a design competition for a small sailing and rowing dinghy. The requirements for this dinghy were:

- an overall length of 12 feet,
- a beam of 4 feet 6 inches and
- a single sail of 100 square feet.

The hull was to be clinker, planked in spruce on bent timbers. Cockshott's design became known worldwide as the 'International' 12 Foot Dinghy. The design was granted informal international status in 1914 and full international status was confirmed by the IYRU (now World Sailing) in 1919. In 1920 the 12 foot dinghy was used in the Summer Olympics as the first one design class. The dinghy was also used as an Olympic class in 1928, Amsterdam. The International status of the class was revoked in 1964 by the IYRU, but the dinghy is still raced widely across the world.
