= Kirill Kozhevnikov (sailor) =

Soviet sailor

Personal information
- Nationality: Soviet
- Born: 1926 (age 99–100)

Sport
- Sport: Sailing

Kirill Kozhevnikov (born 1926) was a Soviet sailor. He competed in the 6 Metre event at the 1952 Summer Olympics in Helsinki, Finland.
