= Håkon Solem =

Norwegian sailor

Personal information
- Nationality: Norwegian
- Born: 10 July 1908; Kristiania
- Died: 7 December 1993 (aged 85)

Sport
- Sport: Sailing

Håkon Solem (10 July 1908 – 7 December 1993) was a Norwegian sailor. He was born in Kristiania. He competed at the 1948 Summer Olympics in London, where he placed fourth in the 6 metre class, together with Magnus Konow, Ragnar Hargreaves, Anders Evensen and Lars Musæus.
