= Carlos Borchers =

Brazilian sailor (1907–1973)

Personal information
- Full name: Carlos Rudolfo Borchers
- Nationality: Brazilian
- Born: 13 November 1907 Rio de Janeiro, Brazil
- Died: 10 June 1973 (aged 65) São Paulo, Brazil

Sport
- Sport: Sailing

Carlos Rudolfo Borchers (13 November 1907 – 10 June 1973) was a Brazilian sailor. He competed in the Swallow event at the 1948 Summer Olympics. Borchers died in São Paulo on 10 June 1973, at the age of 65.
