= Martin Sharp (sailor) =

British sailor (1917–1991)

Personal information
- Nationality: British
- Born: 26 June 1917; London, England
- Died: 24 February 1991 (aged 73)

Sport
- Sport: Sailing

Martin Sharp (26 June 1917 – 24 February 1991) was a British sailor. He competed in the 6 Metre event at the 1952 Summer Olympics.
