= Ragnar Hargreaves =

Norwegian sailor (1907–1965)

Personal information
- Born: 22 March 1907 Kristiania, Norway
- Died: 18 February 1965 (aged 57)

Sailing career
- Country: Norway
- Sport: Sailing
- Club: Royal Norwegian Yacht Club

Ragnar Hargreaves (22 March 1907 – 18 February 1965) was a Norwegian sailor.

== Biography ==
He was born in Kristiania and represented the Royal Norwegian Yacht Club in that city. He competed at the 1948 Summer Olympics in London, where he placed fourth in the 6 metre class, together with Magnus Konow, Anders Evensen, Håkon Solem and Lars Musæus.

Musæus was also his brother-in-law, whereas Hargreaves also was a son-in-law of Magnus Konow and brother-in-law of Karsten Konow.
