= Nikolay Yermakov =

Soviet sailor

Personal information
- Nationality: Soviet
- Born: 3 January 1910; Saint Petersburg, Russian Empire
- Died: 1982 (aged 71–72)

Sport
- Sport: Sailing

Nikolay Yermakov (3 January 1910 – 1982) was a Soviet sailor. He competed in the 6 Metre event at the 1952 Summer Olympics.
