= Anders Evensen =

Norwegian sailor

Personal information
- Nationality: Norwegian
- Born: 2 March 1915; Kristiania, Norway
- Died: 24 March 1988 (aged 73)

Sport
- Sport: Sailing

Anders Evensen (2 March 1915 – 24 March 1988) was a Norwegian sailor. He was born in Kristiania. He competed at the 1948 Summer Olympics in London, where he placed fourth in the 6 metre class, together with Magnus Konow, Ragnar Hargreaves, Håkon Solem and Lars Musæus.
