= Bonar Hardie =

British sailor

Personal information
- Born: 25 July 1925 Glasgow, Scotland
- Died: 4 August 2014 (aged 89) Killearn, Scotland

Sport
- Sport: Sailing

Bonar Hardie (25 July 1925 – 4 August 2014) was a British sailor. He competed in the 6 Metre event at the 1948 Summer Olympics.
