= Bruno Clausen =

Danish sailor (1912–1957)

Personal information
- Nationality: Danish
- Born: 7 March 1912 Aarhus, Denmark
- Died: 7 January 1957 (aged 44) Aarhus, Denmark

Sport
- Sport: Sailing

Bruno Clausen (7 March 1912 – 7 January 1957) was a Danish sailor. He competed in the 6 Metre event at the 1948 Summer Olympics.
