= René la Cour =

Danish sailor

Personal information
- Nationality: Danish
- Born: 12 May 1927; Aarhus, Denmark
- Died: 29 December 2008 (aged 81); Hjørring, Denmark

Sport
- Sport: Sailing

René Marstrand la Cour (12 May 1927 – 29 December 2008) was a Danish sailor. He competed in the 6 Metre event at the 1948 Summer Olympics.
