= Naalli Petersen =

Danish sailor

Personal information
- Nationality: Danish
- Born: 15 March 1919; Dråby, Denmark
- Died: 7 March 1997 (aged 77); Jægerspris, Denmark

Sport
- Sport: Sailing

Naalli Petersen (15 March 1919 – 7 March 1997) was a Danish sailor. He competed in the Swallow event at the 1948 Summer Olympics.
