= Nikolay Matveyev (sailor) =

Soviet sailor

Personal information
- Nationality: Soviet
- Born: 1912

Sport
- Sport: Sailing

Nikolay Matveyev (born 1912, date of death unknown) was a Soviet sailor. He competed in the 6 Metre event at the 1952 Summer Olympics.
