= Troels la Cour =

Danish sailor

Personal information
- Nationality: Danish
- Born: 19 May 1889; Aarhus, Denmark
- Died: 10 May 1973 (aged 83); Aarhus, Denmark

Sport
- Sport: Sailing

Troels la Cour (19 May 1889 – 10 May 1973) was a Danish sailor. He competed in the 6 Metre event at the 1948 Summer Olympics.
