= Robert Lacarrière =

French sailor

Personal information
- Full name: Henri Roger Lacarrière
- Nationality: French
- Born: 22 November 1898; Paris, France
- Died: 8 August 1970 (aged 71); Paris, France

Sport
- Sport: Sailing

Robert Lacarrière (22 November 1898 – 8 August 1970) was a French sailor. He competed in the 6 Metre event at the 1948 Summer Olympics.
