= Lars Musæus =

Norwegian sailor

Personal information
- Nationality: Norwegian
- Born: 9 August 1908 Ålesund, Norway
- Died: 7 May 1975 (aged 66)

Sport
- Sport: Sailing

Lars Musæus (9 August 1908 – 7 June 1975) was a Norwegian sailor.

== Biography ==
Born in Ålesund on 9 August 1908, Musæus competed at the 1948 Summer Olympics in London, where he placed fourth in the 6 metre class, together with Magnus Konow, Ragnar Hargreaves, Anders Evensen and Håkon Solem.
