= Boris Lobashkov =

Soviet sailor

Personal information
- Nationality: Soviet
- Born: 3 April 1921; Moscow, USSR

Sport
- Sport: Sailing

Boris Lobashkov (Russian: Борис Лобашков; born 3 April 1921) was a Soviet sailor. He competed in the 6 Metre event at the 1952 Summer Olympics.
