= Svend Iversen =

Danish sailor

Svend Valdemar Iversen
Personal information
- Nationality: Danish
- Born: 17 October 1913; Aarhus, Denmark
- Died: 17 December 1985 (aged 72); Aarhus, Denmark

Sport
- Sport: Sailing

Svend Valdemar Iversen (17 October 1913 – 17 December 1985) was a Danish sailor. He competed in the 6 Metre event at the 1948 Summer Olympics.
