= Jean Castel =

French sailor

Personal information
- Nationality: French
- Born: 4 June 1916
- Died: 23 September 1999 (aged 83)

Sport
- Sport: Sailing

Jean Castel (4 June 1916 – 23 September 1999) was a French sailor. He competed in the 6 Metre event at the 1948 Summer Olympics.
