= Willy Huybrechts =

Belgian sailor (1921–1980)

Personal information
- Nationality: Belgian
- Born: 6 April 1921; Antwerp, Belgium
- Died: 26 January 1980 (aged 58) 's-Gravenwezel, Belgium

Sport
- Sport: Sailing

Willy Huybrechts (6 April 1921 – 26 January 1980) was a Belgian sailor. He competed in the 6-Metre event at the 1948 Summer Olympics.
