= Eyvin Schiøttz =

Danish sailor

Personal information
- Full name: Eyvin Seward Schiøttz
- Nationality: Danish
- Born: 28 April 1910
- Died: 10 April 1978 (aged 67) Copenhagen

Sport

Sailing career
- Class(es): Soling, 6 Metre
- Updated on 4 November 2019

Eyvin Seward Schiøttz (28 April 1910 in Copenhagen – 10 April 1978 in Copenhagen) was a sailor from Denmark, who was one of the reserve team members for the Danish 6 Metre at the 1948 Summer Olympics at Torbay, Great Britain.

Since the beginning of the activities of the International Soling Association Eyvin played an important role for the Soling class. The annual Soling Guides from 1970 until the 1977 edition was mainly his work. From 1967 till his death, after a long illness, in 1978 Eyvin was secretary and treasurer of the International Soling Association.

Eyvin was author of many books. Some of them are listed below:

- Practical yacht racing : a hand book on the 1959 racing rules, racing technique and tactics
- Jeg er sejler
- 1913-1963 : Sejlernes håndbog
- International Yacht Racing Union's kapsejladsregler : 1. jan. 1961 med kommentarer : tillæg til "Kapsejlads" og "Den lille kapsejlads"
- Kongelig Dansk Yachtklub
- Danske både : Dansk Sejlunions fartøjsfortegnelse 1962

Eyvin was the father of Nina Schiøttz

Other offices
Preceded by New office	Secretary International Soling Association; 1967 - 1979	Succeeded by (Netherlands) Arnold van Altena
