= Achille Roncoroni =

Italian sailor (1923–2005)

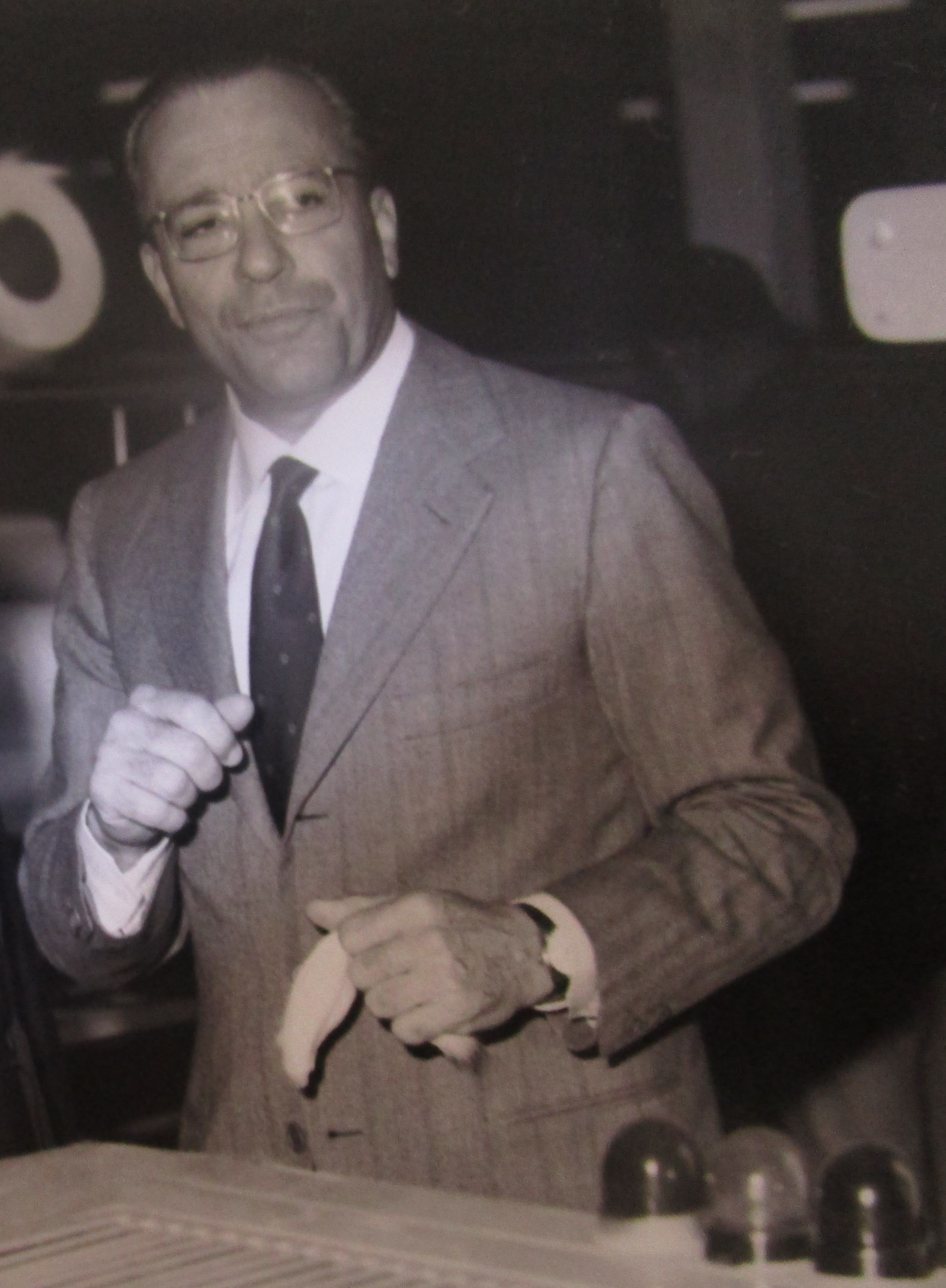

Personal information
- Nationality: Italian
- Born: 21 April 1923; Milan, Italy
- Died: 23 April 2005 (aged 82); Tremezzo, Italy

Sport
- Sport: Sailing

Achille Roncoroni (21 April 1923 – 23 April 2005) was an Italian industrial and sailor. He competed in the Swallow event at the 1948 Summer Olympics.
