= Werner von Foerster =

Argentine sailor

Personal information
- Nationality: Argentine
- Born: 10 February 1897

Sport
- Sport: Sailing

Werner von Foerster (born 10 February 1897, date of death unknown) was an Argentine sailor. He competed in the 6 Metre event at the 1952 Summer Olympics.
