= James Weekes =

American sailor

Medal record

Sailing

Representing the United States

Olympic Games
Gold medal – first place	1948 London	6 m class

James Higginson Weekes (September 11, 1911 – June 13, 1977) was an American sailor and Olympic champion.

He competed at the 1948 Summer Olympics in London, where he won a gold medal in the 6 metre class with the boat Uanoria, together with Herman Whiton, James Smith, Alfred Loomis and Michael Mooney. He graduated from Harvard University.
