= Émile Hayoit =

Belgian sailor

Émile Leon Hayoit
Personal information
- Nationality: Belgian
- Born: 6 September 1898; Koekelberg, Belgium

Sport
- Sport: Sailing

Émile Leon Hayoit (born 6 September 1898, date of death unknown) was a Belgian sailor. He competed in the 6 Metre event at the 1948 Summer Olympics.
