= Hércules Morini =

Argentine sailor

Personal information
- Nationality: Argentine
- Born: 17 May 1910

Sport
- Sport: Sailing

Hércules Morini (born 17 May 1910, date of death unknown) was an Argentine sailor. He competed in the 6 Metre event at the 1952 Summer Olympics.
