= Douglas Hume =

British sailor

Personal information
- Nationality: British
- Born: 4 May 1928 Melbourne, Australia
- Died: 26 April 2009 (aged 80) Helensburgh, Scotland

Sport
- Sport: Sailing

Douglas Hume (4 May 1928 – 26 April 2009) was a British sailor. He competed in the 6 Metre event at the 1948 Summer Olympics.
