= François Laverne =

French sailor

Personal information
- Nationality: French
- Born: 23 May 1907; Paris, France
- Died: 28 December 1988 (aged 81); Boulogne-Billancourt, France

Sport
- Sport: Sailing

François Laverne (23 May 1907 – 28 December 1988) was a French sailor. He competed in the 6 Metre event at the 1948 Summer Olympics.
