= Harry Hunter (sailor) =

British sailor

Personal information
- Nationality: British
- Born: 30 March 1924 East Dunbartonshire, Scotland
- Died: 15 December 1988 (aged 64) Helensburgh, Scotland

Sport
- Sport: Sailing

James Henry Arrol Hunter (30 March 1924 – 15 December 1988) was a British sailor. He competed in the 6 Metre event at the 1948 Summer Olympics representing Great Britain.

According to Olympedia, Hunter was born in Bearsden and served in the Royal Navy during World War II. He was a member of the Royal Clyde Yacht Club. At the 1948 Games, he was part of a four-man crew with Douglas Hume, and brothers Bonar and Hamish Hardie. They finished fifth overall. In the late 1950s, Hunter relocated to Rhodesia and worked in a copper mine. He was involved in an accident at the mine which resulted in amputation of a leg. He returned to Scotland, and worked in the paper and printing business.
