= Rote Hellström =

Finnish sailor

Personal information
- Nationality: Finnish
- Born: 1 April 1908; Uusikaupunki, Finland
- Died: 13 November 1995 (aged 87); Helsinki, Finland

Sport
- Sport: Sailing

Rote Hellström (1 April 1908 – 13 November 1995) was a Finnish sailor. He competed in the 6 Metre event at the 1948 Summer Olympics.
