= Johan Ferner =

Norwegian businessman and sailor (1927–2015)

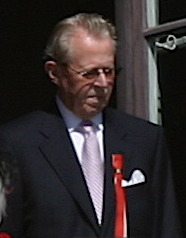
- Ferner in 2007
- Born: Johan Martin Jacobsen; 22 July 1927; Oslo, Norway
- Died: 24 January 2015 (aged 87); The National Hospital, Oslo, Norway
- Burial place: Ris Church Cemetery, Oslo, Norway
- Spouses: Ingeborg Hesselberg-Meyer (m. 1953; div. 1956); Princess Astrid of Norway (m. 1961)
- Children: 5
- Relatives: Finn Ferner (brother)
- Sports career
- Sport: Sailing
Medal record
Sailing
Representing Norway
Olympic Games
Silver medal – second place	1952 Helsinki	6 metre class

Johan Martin Ferner (né Jacobsen; 22 July 1927 – 24 January 2015) was a Norwegian sailor and Olympic medalist. He won a silver medal in sailing at the 1952 Summer Olympics in Helsinki. He was married to Princess Astrid of Norway.

== Early life and career ==
Johan Martin Jacobsen was born on 22 July 1927 in Oslo, the son of master tailor Ferner Jacobsen (1884–1964) and his wife, Ragnhild Olsen (1889–1966). His grandfather was maritime pilot Johan Martin Jacobsen (1850–1907) from Tjøme Municipality, son of blacksmith Jacob Andreas Knudsen (1819–1868). His family adopted their father's given name, Ferner, as their family name.

He studied business in Norway, at the London Polytechnic Institution and Bradford Technical College in England and at the University of Lyon in France. At his father's death in 1964, he and his brother, Finn Ferner, took over the management of the family clothing company, Ferner Jacobsen.

== Olympic sailing ==
At the 1952 Summer Olympics in Helsinki, Ferner won the silver medal in sailing in the 6 metre class with the boat Elisabeth X, together with his brother Finn Ferner, Erik Heiberg, Tor Arneberg and Carl Mortensen.

== Personal life and death ==
Firstly, on 20 January 1953, Johan Ferner married artist Ingeborg 'Bitte' Hesselberg-Meyer (later Rostad; 1931–1997). They divorced in 1956. He then remarried at Asker Church on 12 January 1961 to Princess Astrid of Norway (1932–2026), the second daughter of King Olav V of Norway and Princess Märtha of Sweden.

Ferner died on 24 January 2015 at the National Hospital in Oslo, at the age of 87.

The couple had five children:

- Cathrine Ferner (b. 22 July 1962)
- Benedikte Ferner (b. 27 September 1963)
- Alexander Ferner (b. 15 March 1965)
- Elisabeth Ferner (b. 30 March 1969)
- Carl-Christian Ferner (b. 22 October 1972)

== Honours ==
=== National honours ===
- Norway: Knight Commander of the Order of St. Olav
- Norway: Recipient of the Medal of the 100th Anniversary of the Birth of King Haakon VII
- Norway: Recipient of the King Olav V Silver Jubilee Medal
- Norway: Recipient of the King Olav V Commemorative Medal
- Norway: Recipient of the Medal of the 100th Anniversary of the Birth of King Olav V
- Norway: Recipient of the Royal House Centenary Medal

=== Foreign honours ===
- Belgium: Knight Grand Officer of the Order of Leopold II
- France: Grand Cross of the Order of Merit
- Germany: Commander of the Order of Merit of the Federal Republic of Germany
- Jordan: Knight Grand Cordon of the Order of Independence
- Luxembourg: Knight Commander of the Order of Adolphe of Nassau, Special Class
- Netherlands: Knight Commander of the Order of the Crown
- Spain: Knight Grand Officer of the Order of Isabella the Catholic
- Sweden: Recipient of 50th Birthday Medal of King Carl XVI
