= Lars Lundström =

Swedish sailor

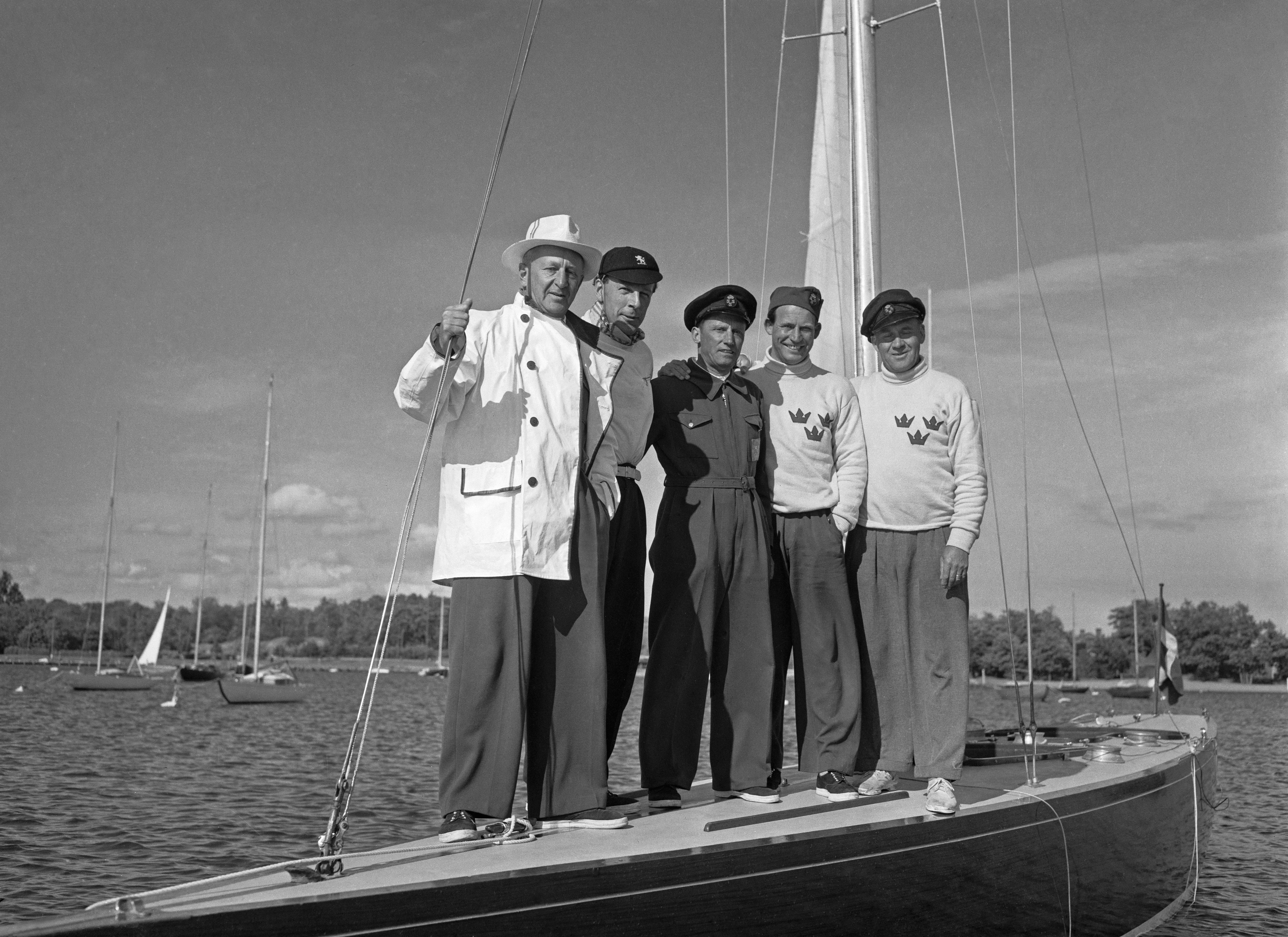
- Lars Lundström in 1952 Summer Olympics as part of the crew of the Swedish MayBe VII

Personal information
- Nationality: Swedish
- Born: 23 August 1914 Solna, Sweden
- Died: 30 June 1982 (aged 67) Djursholm, Sweden

Sport
- Sport: Sailing

Lars Lundström (23 August 1914 – 30 June 1982) was a Swedish sailor. He competed in the 6 Metre event at the 1952 Summer Olympics.
