= François Chapot =

Swiss sailor

Personal information
- Nationality: Swiss
- Born: 13 September 1926
- Died: February 1997

Sport
- Sport: Sailing

François Chapot (13 September 1926 – February 1997) was a Swiss sailor. He competed in the 6 Metre event at the 1952 Summer Olympics.
