= Hamish Hardie =

British sailor (1928–2023)

- Hardie in 2012

Personal information
- Born: 22 September 1928; Glasgow, Scotland
- Died: 1 December 2023 (aged 95); Edinburgh, Scotland

Sport
- Sport: Sailing

Hamish Graeme Hardie (22 September 1928 – 1 December 2023) was a British sailor. He competed in the 6 Metre event at the 1948 Summer Olympics. Hardie died in Edinburgh on 1 December 2023, at the age of 95.
