= Johan Rathje =

Danish sailor

Personal information
- Nationality: Danish
- Born: 26 September 1915; Svendborg, Denmark
- Died: 21 August 1996 (aged 80); Århus, Denmark

Sport
- Sport: Sailing

Johan Rathje (26 September 1915 – 21 August 1996) was a Danish sailor. He competed in the Swallow event at the 1948 Summer Olympics.
