= Richard Townsend (sailor) =

Canadian sailor

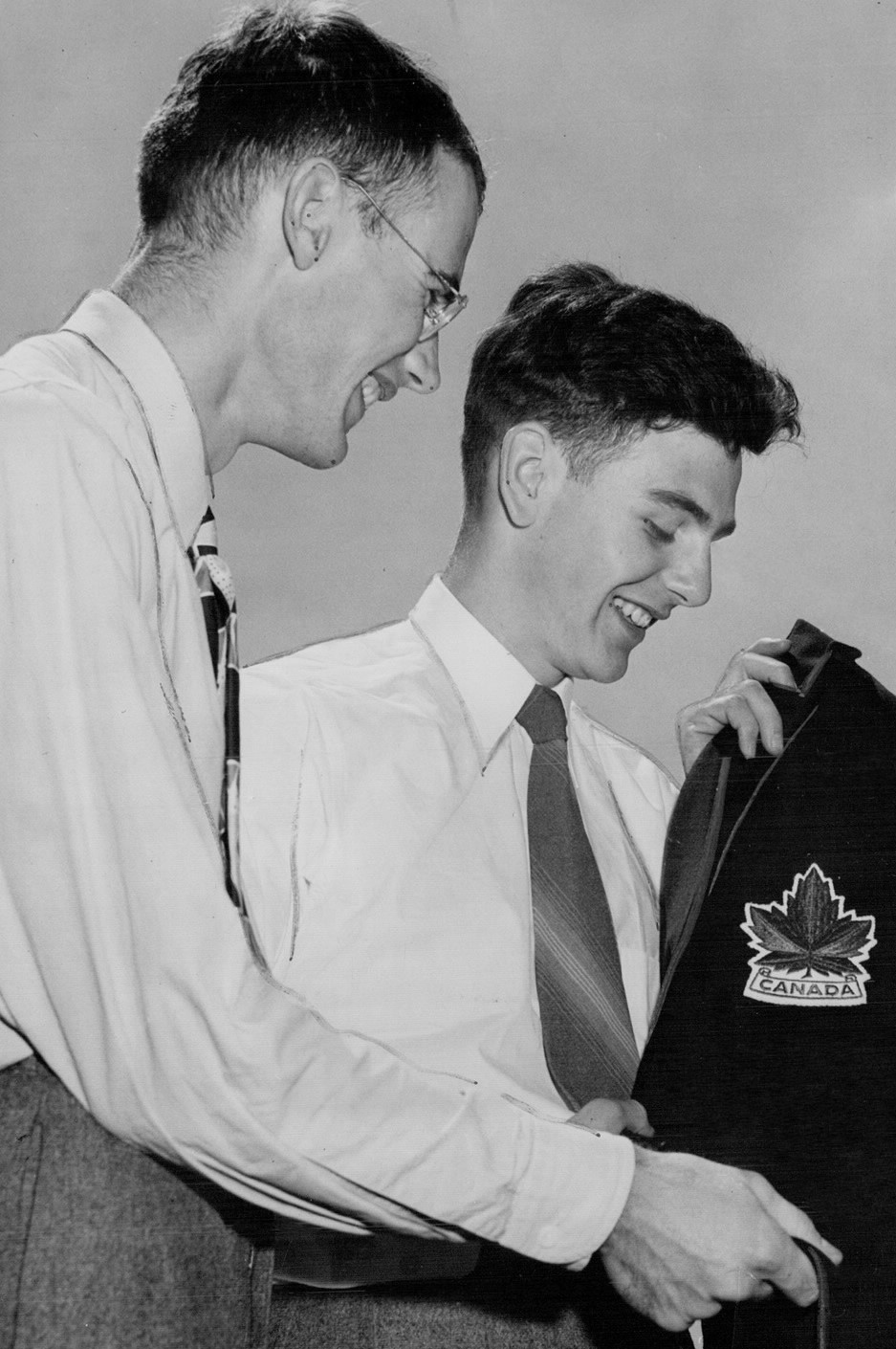
- Townsend (right) in 1948

Personal information
- Born: 29 April 1928 Hamilton, Ontario, Canada
- Died: 22 November 1982 (aged 54) Burlington, Ontario, Canada

Sport
- Sport: Sailing

Richard Layton "Dick" Townsend (29 April 1928 – 22 November 1982) was a Canadian sailor. He placed eighth in the Swallow class at the 1948 Summer Olympics.
