= West Kirby Star =

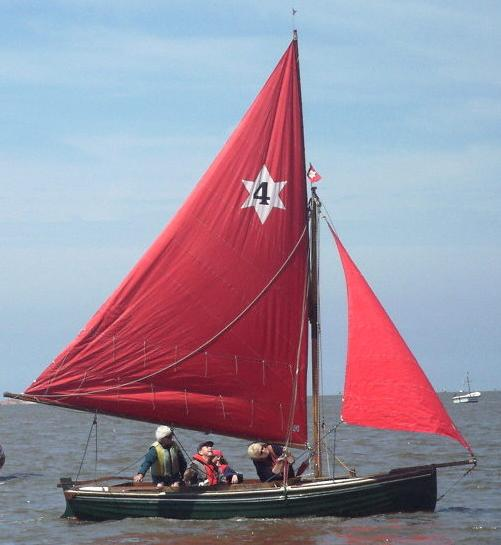
Carina rounding a mark in West Kirby's Regatta

In 1906 the Star class was designed by George Cockshott for the West Lancashire Yacht Club, as a 'Suitable craft for the young and inexperienced sailor' to be used on Southport marine lake in the winter months. The original boats were built by Lathoms of Hesketh Bank at a cost of £32 each. The first race was won by Carina who completed the course in just over 30 minutes. They raced successfully at Southport for 16 years, with one major exception: the death of three West Lancs YC members after their star, Cygnet, capsized on the return from a day trip to Lytham in 1913, but following World War I there was no effort made to revive the winter racing in Stars on the marine lake. Having previously raced on the Dee numerous times in West Kirby Regattas since 1909 the secretary of the Star class wrote to West Kirby Sailing Club in December 1921 to ask if the club was interested in buying the West Lancashire Yacht Club fleet following problems with silting up of the channel at Southport and a lack of support for the class with most of the junior members moving on to sail in the Seabird Half Rater fleet. A special committee was formed in January 1922 of West Kirby members to consider buying the fleet, after a visit to Southport on 25 February it was agreed to purchase the fleet consisting of: Carina, Capella, Vega, Mars and Venus as a nucleus for a club class, it is not known what happened to the original Stars 1, 2, 3 and 5, other than Iris was sold out of the club for the sum of £30 in 1920 and Cygnet was rebuilt following her accident but never sailed at Southport again. On 24 March a meeting was held at West Kirby for prospective owners for the new Star fleet, as there were 14 prospective owners and only 5 boats available a ballot was held with the winning owners required to pay a 20% deposit of the £40 price tag and sign an agreement that the boat would not be sold outside of the club.

In 1924 the club decided to expand the class and had a new boat Jupiter built by S. Bond in Rock Ferry for £78 15s 6p and she was auctioned off at a club hot pot later that year. By the time Stella was built in 1927 the cost had risen to £90 not including sails. Following the success of Jupiter it was decided to have a detailed specification so that any new stars that were built would be as near to Jupiter as possible, this specification included "the deck to be of yellow pine, Planking to be of larch - all through planks without any scarfs or butt joints, boat to be built to the approved specification but workmanship material and design to be modelled on Jupiter which is open for inspection, the committee were to inspect during the construction."

In 1948 it was again agreed to increase the size of the fleet following the loss of Capella without a trace from her mooring at West Kirby, and it was agreed to purchase a new boat from Rutherfords, unfortunately the government would not grant them a licence to build a new boat. Instead the committee turned to Williams & Nixon with a contract to build four new Stars, numbers 6, 8, 10 and 11 for a price of £147 each, there was a delay in building but all four boats were eventually delivered in 1949.

In 1956 with new methods of construction being used to build boats, a sub committee formed to examine the possibility of expanding the fleet and altering the rigging was unanimous that there should be no major modifications to the design and the only changes have been to allow the use of man made fibres for sails and rigging. At the time there was a majority view of star owners that the fleet should not be expanded (11 in favour, 1 against, 2 abstentions) at the current time but instead a new boat somewhat larger than the 16 ft Star should be developed with "a more modern design and a more solid construction than the Liverpool Bay Falcons" This proposal became the Hilbre One Design.

Two more boats were added to the fleet in 1981 by then price had risen to £4000.

Their clinker constructions and seaworthy qualities make them ideal for the conditions in the Dee Estuary. Class rules dictate that each boat must have red sails, main and jib, with a white star containing the boats number on the main.

They can be sailed single handed but three is the normal racing crew.

== Dimensions ==
- Length overall: 16'9 ft.
- Length on load water line:
- Beam at deck:
- Beam at load water line:
- Draft: 1 ft. 6in. (4 ft 2in. with plate down)
- Sail area: 160sq. ft.

== Current fleet ==
Number	Name	Year built	Boat Builder	Current Status
1	Bellatrix	1906	R. Latham & Co., Crossens	West Lancs Prior to 1922
1	Juno	1933	A. Rutherford	WKSC
2		1906	R. Latham & Co., Crossens	West Lancs Prior to 1922
2	Stella	1927	Dickies Of Bangor	WKSC
3		1906	R. Latham & Co., Crossens	West Lancs Prior to 1922
3	Aquila	1930		
4	Carina	1906	R. Latham & Co., Crossens	WKSC
5		1906	R. Latham & Co., Crossens	West Lancs Prior to 1922
5	Jupiter	1924	S. Bond, Rock Ferry	Lost 1980
5	Jupiter	1981	Conway River Boat Company	WKSC
6	Capella	1907	R. Latham & Co., Crossens	Lost off West Kirby 1945
6	Capella	1949	Williams & Nixon	WKSC
7	Vega	1907	R. Latham & Co., Crossens	WKSC
8	Mars	1907	R. Latham & Co., Crossens	Lost 1926
8	Sirius	1949	Williams & Nixon	WKSC
9	Venus	1907	R. Latham & Co., Crossens	
9	Aquila	1922		
10	Cygnus	1949	Williams & Nixon	WKSC
11	Mars (formerly Milky Way)	1949	Williams & Nixon	WKSC
12	Mercury	1951	A. Rutherford	WKSC
13	Orion	1981	Conway River Boat Company	WKSC
	Iris	1906	R. Latham & Co., Crossens	West Lancs Prior to 1920
	Cygnet	1906	R. Latham & Co., Crossens	West Lancs Prior to 1914
