= Gastón Cibert =

Argentine sailor (1917–1989)

Personal information
- Full name: Gastón Juan Cibert Lanne
- Born: 20 October 1917 Buenos Aires, Argentina
- Died: 4 September 1989 (aged 71) Buenos Aires, Argentina

Sport
- Sport: Sailing

Gastón Juan Cibert Lanne (20 October 1917 – 4 September 1989) was an Argentine sailor. He competed in the Swallow event at the 1948 Summer Olympics. Cibert died in Buenos Aires on 4 September 1989, at the age of 71.
