= Valo Urho =

Finnish sailor

Personal information
- Nationality: Finnish
- Born: 30 January 1916; Helsinki, Finland
- Died: 5 December 2001 (aged 85); Helsinki, Finland

Sport
- Sport: Sailing

Valo Urho (30 January 1916 – 5 December 2001) was a Finnish sailor. He competed in the 6 Metre event at the 1948 Summer Olympics.
