= Henri Perrissol =

French sailor (1909–1964)

Personal information
- Nationality: French
- Born: 16 December 1909; Cannes, France
- Died: 4 April 1964 (aged 54); Paris, France

Sport
- Sport: Sailing

Henri Barthélemy Marius Perrissol (16 December 1909 – 4 April 1964) was a French sailor. He competed in the Swallow event at the 1948 Summer Olympics.
