= Henri Van Riel =

Belgian sailor

Personal information
- Nationality: Belgian
- Born: 31 March 1908; Antwerp, Belgium

Sport
- Sport: Sailing

Henri Van Riel (born 31 March 1908, date of death unknown) was a Belgian sailor. He competed in the 6 Metre event at the 1948 Summer Olympics.
