= Oxford & Cambridge Sailing Society =

The Oxford & Cambridge Sailing Society is a group of Oxford and Cambridge sailing Blues and Half Blues. Their influence on UK and international sailing, particularly team racing, has been quite disproportionate to their small numbers of just over 300 people. Since the founding of the Oxford & Cambridge Sailing Society (O&CSS) in 1934, members have competed in 13 Sailing Olympics and won eight medals (three gold, three silver, and two bronze).

The society (O&CSS) was formed in 1934 by Cambridge Half Blue Stewart Morris, along with three of his contemporaries; Morris was later to win a gold medal at the 1948 Olympics. The aim of the society was "to keep members of the two clubs together after coming down from the university, and encourage team racing throughout the country, at the same time maintaining a high standard of helmsmanship". The two clubs referred to are the Oxford University Yacht Club (founded in 1884) and the Cambridge University Cruising Club (founded in 1893).

The society has always limited its membership; 24 sailors were elected in the first year and since then four to ten of the best sailors from Oxford and Cambridge have been elected each year as they graduate. Occasionally non-blues are elected because of their later achievements in either competitive sailing or sailing administration. Good histories exist of the society and of the Oxford University Yacht Club (1884–1994 and 1994–2009) – available in some libraries and from their author. A brief history of the Cambridge University Cruising Club is maintained on that club's website.

== International honours ==
Like many sports in the 1930s, Oxford and Cambridge students and alumni competed at the highest sailing levels. In the 1936 Olympic yachting trials, half of the recently formed society's membership took part. Since then, society members, usually after their student days, have continued to compete with success at the highest levels in sailing. In 2011 the top three sailors in the International 14 Dinghy World Championships were all members of the society, as was the OK dinghy World Champion and Yachtsman of the Year, Nick Craig. The skipper of the winning Abu Dhabi Ocean Racing entry in the 2014/15 Volvo (round-the-world) Ocean Race and two-times Olympic silver medallist, Ian Walker, is a member. Five-times winner of the International 14 World Championships, Archie Massey, is also a member, as is Nick Craig, five-times winner of the OK Dinghy World Championships.

It is unlikely that any UK sailing club, particularly one that has had such a small membership, can boast of such a record. Details of the society's Olympic involvement are tabled below.

1936 – Berlin/Kiel		
Chris Boardman, Miles Bellville, Charles Leaf	6 Metre	Gold
Peter Scott	Single hander (O-Jolle)	Bronze
Stewart Morris	Team Manager	
Kenneth Preston, Francis Preston	8 Metre	
1948 – London/Weymouth		
Stewart Morris	Swallow	Gold
Peter Scott, John Winter	Olympic Committee	
Kenneth Preston	International Jury	
1952 – Helsinki		
Kenneth Preston	6 Metre	
1956 – Melbourne		
Jonathan Janson	Dragon	Bronze
Tom Paxton	Reserve	
Richard Creagh-Osborne	Finn	
1960 – Rome/Naples		
Jonathan Janson	Dragon	
Sir Kenneth Preston	Team Captain	
Richard Creagh-Osborne	Reserve	
Peter Scott	Chairman, International Jury	
1964 – Tokyo/Sagami Bay		
No participation – but see footnote re Jonathan Janson		
1968 – Mexico/Acapulco		
Iain MacDonald-Smith	Flying Dutchman	Gold
1972 – Munich/Kiel		
Simon Tait	Dragon	
David Wilkins (IRL)	Tempest	
Iain Macdonald-Smith	Reserve	
1976 – Montreal/Kingston		
Phil Crebbin	470	
Iain Macdonald-Smith	Soling	
David Wilkins (IRL)	Tempest	
1980 – Moscow/Tallinn		
David Wilkins (IRL)	Flying Dutchman	Silver
1984 – Los Angeles		
No participation – but see footnote re Jonathan Janson		
1988 – Seoul/Pusan		
Roger Yeoman	Flying Dutchman	
David Wilkins, Peter Kennedy (IRL)	Flying Dutchman	
1992 – Barcelona		
David Wilkins, Peter Kennedy (IRL)	Flying Dutchman	
Iain Macdonald-Smith	Selector	
1996 – Atlanta/Savannah		
Ian Walker	470	Silver
Barry Parkin	Soling	
2000 – Sydney		
Ian Walker	Star	Silver
Barry Parkin	Soling	
2004 – Athens		
Ian Walker	Yngling Coach	
Barry Parkin	Selector	
2008 – Beijing/Qingdao		
Chris Atkins	Chairman, Selectors	
2012 – London/Weymouth		
Annie Lush	Women's Match Racing	
Chris Atkins	Chairman, Selectors	
David Wilkins, Jo Lucas	Race Team	

Jonathan Janson, having competed in 1956 and 1960, was also involved in most of the subsequent Olympic regattas up to 1992 as a Vice President of the International Yacht Racing Union (IYRU) – now World Sailing. His duties including overseeing the pre-Olympic regattas, International Jury service, and other roles.

The following sailors have represented the UK in the biennial World Team Racing Championships.

Name	Team Championship	Result
Amanda Best (now Hampson)	1995 – West Kirby, UK	Gold
Ed Smith	1998 – Miami, USA	Silver
Dan Quinn	1998 – Miami, USA	Silver
Chris Lynham (Killed in a motorcycle accident that same year)	1998 – Miami, USA	Silver
Rob Sherrington	2001 – Lake Brno, Czech Republic	5th
Rob Sherrington	2003 – Auckland, New Zealand	Silver
Rob Sherrington	2005 – Newport, USA	Bronze
Richard Guy	2001 – Lake Brno, Czech Republic	5th
Richard Guy	2003 – Auckland, New Zealand	Silver
Tom Hebbert	2001 – Lake Brno, Czech Republic	5th
Tom Hebbert	2007 – Gandia, Spain	Silver

== Team racing ==
The society is known for its involvement with the Olympics, having competed in every Summer Olympic game since 1936.

Founder Stewart Morris had experienced the occasional team race in his youth on the Norfolk Broads, where the professional skippers raced against their amateur owners from time to time. When he went up to Cambridge in October 1927, he sailed in three Varsity Match against Oxford (1928–1930), and experienced intense team racing competition, fuelled by traditional Light Blue–Dark Blue rivalry. The sailing Varsity Match was first held in 1912, but was interrupted between 1915 and 1919 by the First World War and in 1940 by the Second World War. Over the years, the standard and tactics of the team racing improved considerably, and great rivalry existed between the University teams. A fuller history of the match will be found on the O&CSS website.

Stewart's desire to bring together members of both teams to continue team racing, and to promote this aspect of the sport, was the reason for forming the society. By organising matches against other sailing clubs, the society began to promote team racing and, in time, facilitated the development of events such as the West Kirby Sailing Club Wilson Trophy. That event is now the single most prestigious open team racing event in the UK, with an international entry and reputation. The society's vital role is referred to in the record of West Kirby's initial planning meeting: "Support would have to be gained from the Oxford & Cambridge Sailing Society, which was the most important body sponsoring team racing.", and (Sir) Cyril Clarke, one of the three West Kirby helmsmen who provided the stimulus for the first 'Wilson' event, was a member.

Since then, team racing has grown both in popularity and skill levels, with the sport becoming international and a Team Racing World Championships starting in 1995. The UK Royal Yachting Association and UK Team Racing Association (UKTRA) actively promotes team racing and holds an annual UK Championship and Ladies Championship. There is also an annual British Universities Sailing Association Team Racing Championship, contested after several rounds of regional qualifiers. UK schools are also active with annual championships organised via the British Schools Dinghy Racing Association, and the National Schools Sailing Association. Society members play a leading role in the organisation of all these events, and the society's ladies team won the UK National Ladies Championships four times during the five years 2004—2008, and again in 2013. Furthermore, Bruce Hebbert, the instigator of the European 2K Keel Boat Team Racing Series, is a member.

== Vintage port ==
One less serious aspect of the club is also worth commenting on. In 1936, a member donated 48 bottles of vintage port for consumption at the annual dinner. Grateful members subsequently elected him president for a term, and in 1946 the society started investing its own funds in vintage port. This ‘liquid’ investment strategy has proved most successful. Excellent port is available at annual dinners at extremely low cost, the society's reserves have steadily appreciated, and bottles of port are occasionally sold to provide funds to buy newer vintages for future generations to enjoy.
