= Torsten Lord =

Swedish sailor

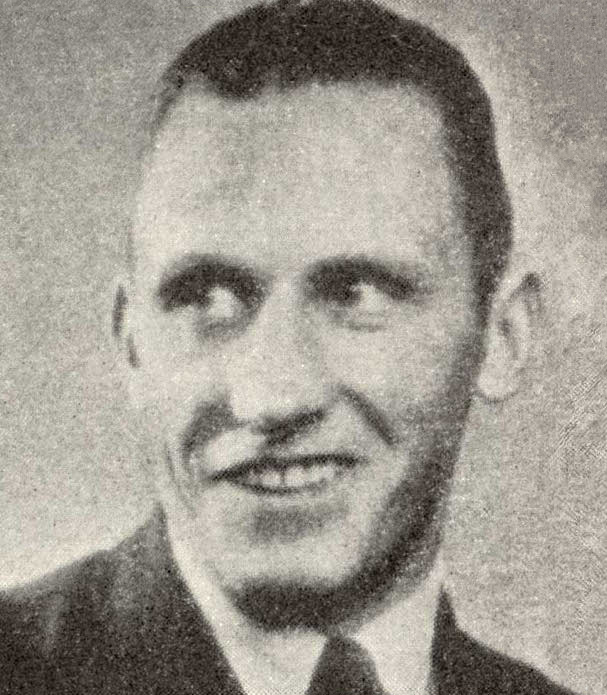

Personal information
- Full name: Torsten Hjalmar Lord
- Born: 2 March 1904 Nacka, Stockholm, Sweden
- Died: 4 February 1970 (aged 65) Lidingö, Stockholm, Sweden

Sailing career
- Sport: Sailing
- Club: Royal Swedish Yacht Club
- Class: 6 Metre
Medal record
Sailing
Representing Sweden
Olympic Games
Bronze medal – third place	1936 Berlin	6 metre class
Bronze medal – third place	1948 London	6 metre class

Torsten Hjalmar Lord (2 March 1904 – 4 February 1970) was a Swedish sailor who competed at the 1936, 1948 and 1952 Summer Olympics. In 1936 he won the bronze medal as crew member of the Swedish boat May Be in the 6 metre class. Twelve years later he won his second bronze medal. This time as crew member of the Swedish boat Ali Baba II in the 6 metre class. In 1952 he finished fourth as a crew member of the Swedish boat May Be II in the 6 metre class event.
