= Carlos Sáez (sailor) =

Uruguayan sailor (1917–1993)

Personal information
- Full name: Carlos Alberto Sáez Rossi
- Born: 17 December 1917 Montevideo, Uruguay
- Died: 16 May 1993 (aged 75) Montevideo, Uruguay

Sport
- Sport: Sailing

Carlos Alberto Sáez Rossi (Note: In this Hispanic American name, the first or paternal surname is Sáez and the second or maternal family name is Rossi.) (17 December 1917 – 16 May 1993) was a Uruguayan sailor. He competed in the Swallow event at the 1948 Summer Olympics. Sáez died in Montevideo on 16 May 1993, at the age of 75.
