= Emelyn Whiton =

American sailor (1916–1962)

Personal information
- Born: March 1, 1916 New York City, United States
- Died: March 1, 1962 (aged 46) New York City, United States

Sport
- Sport: sailing

Emelyn Thatcher Whiton (née Leonard, later Righter, March 1, 1916 – March 1, 1962) was an American sailor.

Emelyn Leonard was born in New York City. In 1939, she married Herman Whiton, who was helmsman of the American boat Llanoria which won the 6 metre class at the 1948 Olympics. Herman repeated the feat at the 1952 Olympics with the same boat and a different crew, including his wife as an alternate. Since she had not participated in the Olympic regatta, she did not receive a medal.

Emelyn divorced Herman Whiton in 1957 and married Brewster Righter in 1958. She died in the plane crash of American Airlines Flight 1 in Jamaica Bay, on her 46th birthday.
