= Stig Hedberg =

Swedish sailor

Personal information
- Nationality: Swedish
- Born: 19 September 1915 Stockholm, Sweden
- Died: 1 August 1996 (aged 80) Stockholm, Sweden

Sport
- Sport: Sailing

Stig Hedberg (19 September 1915 – 1 August 1996) was a Swedish sailor. He competed in the Swallow event at the 1948 Summer Olympics.
