= Gösta Salén =

Swedish sailor

Medal record

Sailing

Representing Sweden

Olympic Games
Bronze medal – third place	1948 London	6 metre class

Gösta Antenor Salén (January 4, 1922 – February 2002) was a Swedish sailor who competed in the 1948 Summer Olympics.

In 1948 he won the bronze medal as a crew member of the Swedish boat Ali Baba II in the 6 metre class.
