= Adolf Konto =

Finnish sailor

Medal record

Men's sailing

Representing Finland

Olympic Games
Bronze medal – third place	1952 Helsinki	6 metre class

Jonas Leo Adolf Konto (30 March 1911 – 20 November 1965) was a Finnish sailor who competed in the 1948 Summer Olympics and in the 1952 Summer Olympics.
