= Carl Mortensen =

Norwegian sailor

Medal record

Sailing

Representing Norway

Olympic Games
Silver medal – second place	1952 Helsinki	6 metre class

Carl Lauritz Mortensen (2 March 1919 – 1 November 2005) was a Norwegian sailor and Olympic medalist. He was born and died in Oslo. He received a silver medal in the 6 metre class with the boat Elisabeth X at the 1952 Summer Olympics in Helsinki, together with Johan Ferner, Erik Heiberg, Tor Arneberg and Finn Ferner.
