= Swallow (keelboat) =

Type of keelboat

Development
- Designer: Tom Thornycroft
- Year: 1946

Boat
- Crew: 3 (current); 2 (Olympics)
- Draft: 1.04 m (3 ft 5 in)

Hull
- Hull weight: 1,022 kg (2,253 lb); 358 kg (789 lb) (hull); 608 kg (1,340 lb) (keel)
- LOA: 7.77 m (25 ft)
- LWL: 5.8 m (19 ft)
- Beam: 1.7 m (5 ft 7 in)

Sails
- Spinnaker area: 26.0 m^{2} (280 sq ft)
- Upwind sail area: 20.32 m^{2} (218.7 sq ft)

The Swallow (also known as the National Swallow) is a type of one-design classic keelboat that was used as a two-man Olympic class for the 1948 Olympics. It is now sailed with three crew. Now a thoroughly modern classic, the main fleet is at Itchenor in Chichester Harbour, West Sussex, with a smaller fleet at Aldeburgh, Suffolk. There are around 40 active boats. As a National Class, the rules and affairs of the Class are regulated by the Royal Yachting Association. Many of these boats are named after birds and, in particular, sea birds.

Major changes to the National Swallow Class Rules in the 1970s enabled the move to grp construction, the addition of self-bailers (4) and, in 2010, the modernisation of the fore and aft rig, with a higher aspect ratio mainsail and lower footed jib. The latest rule change in 2014 allows electric bilge pumps.

The Swallow was designed by Tom Thornycroft as a potential replacement for the Star class still in use. The design was entered in a 1946 competition sponsored by Yachting magazine but never became significantly popular outside the United Kingdom.

The design has a 3/4 keel with an attached raked rudder. It has dinghy-like characteristics and is capable of planing in strong breezes. It was designed both "to go fast and look beautiful". Many Swallow sailors have moved to the Class from dinghy classes, including the International 14.

Sail numbers have now reached 95 and the current builder is Composite Craft of the Isle of Wight, Hampshire, England www.compositecraft.co.uk . The first new Swallow for some years, commissioned for build over the winter of 2017/18, has now been completed and allocated Number 95 and given the name "Osprey". As at September 2017, the National Class Secretary is Charles Prescot and the National Class Chairman is George Miller, with the Itchenor Class Captain being Tony Glover. The National Championships 2018 were held on 07 and 8 July 2018 under the flag of Itchenor Sailing Club in Hayling Bay. The winners were Mike Wigmore, Mark Struckett and Charles Hyatt in S 93 'Gwaihir'.

They went on to win the National Swallow Class in Cowes Classics Week 2018, which was held in Cowes between 23 and 27 July 2018. S 3, 'Skua', Harry Roome, Prue Roome and Charles Roome, was second in both the National Championships and Cowes Classics Week 2018.

A brand new boat, S95 'Osprey', was launched in 2019.

Further details, including contacts, are on the Itchenor Sailing Club website www.itchenorsc.co.uk at the Swallow Class page.

Further information and the Class history can also be found in 'The Swallows', by Brian Russell, published in 2001.

== Olympic results ==
Games	Gold	Silver	Bronze
1948 London	Great Britain (GBR); Stewart Morris; David Bond	Portugal (POR); Duarte de Almeida Bello; Fernando Pinto Coelho Bello	United States (USA); Lockwood Pirie; Owen Torrey
