= David Bond (sailor) =

British sailor (1922–2013)

Personal information
- Full name: David John Were Bond
- Nickname: Dinghy
- Nationality: British
- Born: 27 March 1922 Falmouth, Cornwall, England
- Died: 23 March 2013 (aged 90) Falmouth, Cornwall, England

Sailing career
- Sport: Sailing
Medal record
Olympic Games
Gold medal – first place	1948 London	Swallow

David John Were Bond (27 March 1922 – 23 March 2013) was a British Olympic gold medallist in sailing. He competed at the 1948 Summer Olympics in London and won a gold medal in the Swallow class with Stewart Morris. He was involved in the promotion of elements related to the 2012 Summer Olympics and was the last surviving British gold medallist from the 1948 Games.

== Biography ==
Bond attended Harrow School as a child.

In March 1948 Bond was informed that he would be competing at the 1948 Summer Olympics in London. To take part, he had to take eight weeks of unpaid leave from his job in the aircraft industry. Along with Stewart Morris, they competed in the Swallow class, which would be the only time it was included in an Olympic Games. The duo went on to win the gold medal in the event, and afterwards celebrated at the Imperial Hotel in Torquay.

When Bond returned to work he was confronted by a boss who asked sarcastically, "I suppose you won the bloody thing, did you?", to which Bond responded, "Yes, we did actually." Bond and Morris' gold medal victory was the only one for the British team at the 1948 Games in sailing, and one of three won by the team overall.

In February 2010 Bert Bushnell was initially thought to be the final surviving gold medallist from the British team at the 1948 Summer Olympics; however, Bond wrote into The Guardian to inform the newspaper that he was very much alive. In the run up to the 2012 Summer Olympics, Bond teamed up with fellow sailing medallist Ben Ainslie to promote "Sail for Gold", an exhibition about the history of sailing at the Olympics. He was involved in the promotion of Royal Mail's range of Olympic stamps. Author Clive Ellis had been proposing that Bond's Olympic achievement should be recognised by the British honours system.
