= Lockwood Pirie =

American sailor

Personal information
- Full name: Lockwood Masters Pirie
- Nickname: Woody
- Born: April 25, 1904 Brooklyn, New York City; New York, U.S.
- Died: May 4, 1965 (aged 61) Miami, Florida, U.S.

Sailing career
- Sport: Sailing
- Class: Star
Medal record
Sailing
Representing United States
Olympic Games
Bronze medal – third place	1948 London	Swallow class
World Championships
Gold medal – first place	1948 Cascais	Star class
Silver medal – second place	1950 Chicago	Star class
Bronze medal – third place	1940 San Diego	Star class

Lockwood Masters "Woody" Pirie (April 25, 1904 – May 4, 1965) was an American competitive sailor and Olympic medalist. He won a bronze medal in the Swallow class at the 1948 Summer Olympics in London, together with Owen Torrey.

== Biography ==
He was born on April 25, 1904. He died on May 4, 1965, in Miami, Florida.
