= World Sailing Open Team Racing World Championships =

Sailing event

- Logo for the 2026 World Sailing Open Team Racing World Championships
- Formerly: ISAF Team Racing World Championship
- First held: 1995
- Organizer: World Sailing
- Website: trwc2026.com

The World Sailing Open Team Racing World Championships (formerly ISAF Team Racing World Championship) is an international team racing competition initiated by World Sailing.

== History ==
The championships were originally held every two years with the first edition held in West Kirby, Great Britain in 1995. Great Britain won and so became the first nation to record its name on the ISAF Team Racing World Trophy, donated to ISAF by the West Kirby Sailing Club. The appearance of West Kirby as the first championship host club reflects the club's pivotal role in promoting team racing – fostered by the activities of the Oxford & Cambridge Sailing Society.

The championships were run every two years from 1995 until the 2011 edition in Schull, after which there was a four year hiatus. The next championships were run in 2015 in Rutland. This was the last championship to be run using the 3v3 format.

In 2024 World Sailing announced that the Team Racing World Championship would return with a new 2v2 format in keelboats. The 2025 event took place 28 May to 1 June at the New York Yacht Club in Newport, RI, United States, supported by US Sailing. The 2026 event was held 12 to 16 August at the Gamla Stan’s Yacht Sällskap, Stockholm, Sweden, and supported by the City of Stockholm and the Swedish Sailing Federation. The bidding process for the 2027 and 2028 championships was announced in 2025 with a deadline of 1 February 2026 and a decision to be made in March 2026.

=== Youth Championship ===
A youth championship (under 21) began running in parallel with the main event in 2005 and was last held in 2015.

== Results ==
Year	Location	Hosted by	Winning Nation	Youth Winners	Boat Used	Ref.
1995	(United Kingdom) West Kirby, GBR	West Kirby Sailing Club	(United Kingdom) GBR 1 Steve Tylecote; Mel Hughes; Greg Eaton; Tasha Hughes; Roger Morris; Damian Boreham	N/A	Firefly	
1998	(United States) Miami, USA	Strictly Sail Miami	(United States) USA 2 Mark Mendelblatt; Nick Trotman; Josh Adams; Brett Davis; Victoria Wadsworth; Blair Largay	N/A	Vanguard 15	
1999	(Republic of Ireland) Dún Laoghaire, Ireland	Royal St. George Yacht Club	(New Zealand) NZL; Andrew Murdoch; Rebecca Murdoch; Hamish Murdoch; Andrew Ardern; Karen Lambert; Alesha Thorpe	N/A	Firefly	
2001	Lake Brno, Brno, Czech Republic	Yacht Club Lodní sporty Brno	(New Zealand) NZL 1 Andrew Murdoch; Karen Lambert; Hamish Murdoch; Josh Galbraith; Andrew Arden; Jeffery Clark	N/A	420	
2003	Auckland, New Zealand	No host club. Organised by NZTRA and sailed out of the America's Cup Village	(United States) USA 2 Timothy Fallon; Karen Renzulli; Graeme Woodworth; Leigh Woodworth; Ery Largay; Brian Doyle	N/A	420	
2005	(United States) Newport, Rhode Island, USA	New York Yacht Club	(United States) USA 1 Timothy Fallon; Karen Renzulli; Mark Ivey; Matt Lindblad; Tim Wadlow; Ery Largay	(United States) USA 1 Colin Merrick; Amanda Callahan; Patrick Hogan; Carlos Lebz; Pete Levesque; Liz Hall	Vanguard 15	
2007	Gandia, Spain	Real Club Náutico de Gandia	(United States) USA 1 Clay Bischoff; Lisa Keith; Peter Levesque; Elizabeth Hall; Colin Merrick; Amanda Callahan	(United Kingdom) GBR 3 Elizabeth Stanley; Ian Robertson; James Goss; Oliver Mulcahy; Elliott Parsons; Stephen Videlo	420	
2009	Perth, Australia	Royal Freshwater Bay Yacht Club; South of Perth Yacht Club	(United States) USA; Clay Bischoff; Lisa Keith; Colin Merrick; Amanda Callahan; Peter Levesque; Liz Hall	(Australia) AUS; Jasper Warren; Jamie Turner; David Gilmour; Aimee Negri; Luke Parkinson; Patrick Vos	Pacer	
2011	(Republic of Ireland) Schull, Ireland	Fastnet Marine and Outdoor Education Centre	(United Kingdom) GBR; Andrew Cornah; Ben Field; Dom Johnson; Hamish Walker; Tom Foster; Deborah Steele	(United Kingdom) GBR; Cameron Douglas; Ben Robinson; Sophie Shepherd; Sarah Lombard; Charlie Fitzgerald; Freddy Williams	TR 3.6	
2015	(United Kingdom) Rutland, UK	Rutland Sailing Club	(United States) USA 1 Michael Menninger; Justin Law; Adrienne Kamiler; Haley Kirk; Lucy Wallace; Tyler Sinks	(United States) USA; Eli Burnes; Henry Burnes; Charlie Hibben; Paige Dunleavy; Ginny Alex; Peter Barron	Firefly	
2025	(United States) Newport, Rhode Island, USA	New York Yacht Club	(United States) USA; Will Bailey; Doug Sabin; Allison Ferraris; Langdon Mitchell; Tim Wadlow; Forbes Barber; Christina Pandapas; Peter Fleming	N/A	Sonar	
2026	(Sweden) Stockholm, SWE	Gamla Stans Yacht Sällskap	(United States) USA 1 Alex Curtiss; Colin Voigt; Davis Hanscom; Walker Banks; Sean Segerblom; Daniel Segerblom; Madison Bashaw; Marley Mais	N/A	J/80	

== Class Team Racing World Championships ==
Team racing world championships are held for the Optimist and International 14 classes as part of their respective class world championships. The International 420 class previously held two editions of a standalone team racing world championship, in 2015 and 2016.
