= Erik Heiberg =

Norwegian sailor

Personal information
- Nationality: Norwegian
- Born: 24 January 1916 Oslo
- Died: 30 December 1996 (aged 80)

Sport
- Sport: Sailing
Medal record
Sailing
Representing Norway
Olympic Games
Silver medal – second place	1952 Helsinki	6 metre class

Erik Heiberg (24 January 1916 – 30 December 1996) was a Norwegian sailor and Olympic medalist. He was born and died in Oslo. He received a silver medal in the 6 metre class with the boat Elisabeth X at the 1952 Summer Olympics in Helsinki, together with Johan Ferner, Finn Ferner, Tor Arneberg and Carl Mortensen.
