= Juan Bidegaray =

Uruguayan sailor (1919–2010)

Personal information
- Born: 31 December 1919; Montevideo, Uruguay
- Died: 9 January 2010 (aged 90)

Sport
- Sport: Sailing

Juan Bidegaray (31 December 1919 – 9 January 2010) was a Uruguayan sailor. He competed in the Swallow event at the 1948 Summer Olympics.
