= Hans Sørensen (sailor) =

Danish sailor

Personal information
- Nationality: Danish
- Born: 1 June 1900; Aarhus, Denmark
- Died: 28 March 1984 (aged 83); Aarhus, Denmark

Sport
- Sport: Sailing

Hans Sørensen (1 June 1900 – 28 March 1984) was a Danish sailor. He competed in the 6 Metre event at the 1948 Summer Olympics.
