= Paul Sjöberg =

Finnish sailor

Medal record

Sailing

Representing Finland

Olympic Games
Bronze medal – third place	1952 Helsinki	6 metre class

Paul Sjöberg (14 July 1897 – 16 March 1978) was a Finnish sailor who competed in the 1952 Summer Olympics.
