= Tor Arneberg =

Norwegian sailor (1928–2015)

Medal record

Sailing

Representing Norway

Olympic Games
Silver medal – second place	1952 Helsinki	6 metre class

Tor Birger Arneberg (4 September 1928 – 23 September 2015) was a Norwegian sailor and Olympic medalist. He was born in Oslo. He received a silver medal in the 6 metre class with the boat Elisabeth X at the 1952 Summer Olympics in Helsinki, together with Johan Ferner, Erik Heiberg, Finn Ferner and Carl Mortensen. He was an all-American ski jumper at Dartmouth College. He has been married to wife Jean for more than 50 years, and they have three daughters, Elisabeth, Marianne and Karin. He is a graduate of Harvard Business School. He was on the board of directors of Royal Caribbean International.
