= Finn Ferner =

Norwegian sailor

- Born: 10 March 1920; Oslo, Norway
- Died: 11 March 2001 (aged 81); Asker, Norway
- Relatives: Johan Ferner (brother)
- Sports career
- Sport: Sailing
Medal record
Sailing
Representing Norway
Olympic Games
Silver medal – second place	1952 Helsinki	6 metre class

Finn Ferner (10 March 1920 – 11 March 2001) was a Norwegian sailor and Olympic medalist.

He was born in Oslo and died in Nesøya. He received a silver medal in the 6 metre class with the boat Elisabeth X at the 1952 Summer Olympics in Helsinki, together with Johan Ferner (his brother), Erik Heiberg, Tor Arneberg and Carl Mortensen.
