= Rickard Sarby =

Swedish sailor

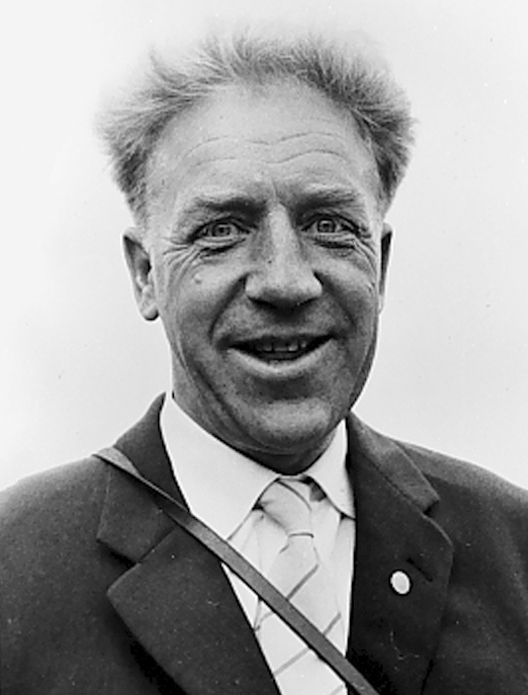

Personal information
- Full name: Erik Rickard Sarby
- Born: 19 September 1912 Dannemora, Sweden
- Died: 10 February 1977 (aged 64) Uppsala, Sweden

Sport
- Sport: Sailing

Sailing career
- Club: Uppsala KF
Medal record
Sailing
Representing Sweden
Olympic Games
Bronze medal – third place	1952 Helsinki	Finn class

Erik Rickard Sarby (19 September 1912 – 10 February 1977) was a Swedish sailor. He competed in the mixed one-person dinghy event at the 1948, 1952 and 1956 Olympics and finished in fourth, third and fifth place, respectively.

Born in a village near Uppsala, Sarby moved to the main city in the 1930s. There he worked as a hairdresser and sailed in free time. He later became a boat designer.

== Boat designer ==
Having taken up the design of sailing canoes (his success with C-class designs is noted in the Swedish Wikipedia), Rickard Sarby submitted an entry, named 'FIN', to a 1948 competition for the design of a single-handed dinghy suitable for both local and Olympic use. The design was based on an earlier open class E double-ended sailing canoe. The success of the subsequent prototype 'FINT' dinghy in sailing trials was sufficient to reverse its rejection in earlier rounds of selection. Further renamed Finn, it remained an Olympic class from Helsinki 1952 to Tokyo 2020, thus being the longest-running class in the Olympic fleet.
