= Everard Endt =

American sailor

Personal information
- Nationality: American
- Born: April 7, 1893 Zaandam, Netherlands
- Died: September 16, 1980 Baden-Baden, Germany

Sport
- Sport: Sailing
Medal record
Men's sailing
Representing the United States
Olympic Games
Gold medal – first place	1952 Helsinki	6 metre class

Everard Coenraad "Ducky" Endt (April 7, 1893, in Zaandam, Netherlands, to mother Johanna E Dekker and father Hendrik Endt – September 16, 1980, in Baden-Baden, Germany) was an American sailor and Olympic champion. He competed at the 1952 Summer Olympics in Helsinki, where he won a gold medal in the 6 metre class with the boat Llanoria. Endt was the oldest American to win a gold medal in yachting (aged 59). Endt was part of the crew of the yacht "Dorade" that raced in the Fastnet Yacht race in 1933.

Endt became a US citizen in October 1933. Endt divorced his second wife, Whitney, in March 1936 in Reno, Nevada, after five years of marriage.

Endt served in the US Navy Reserves as an officer, reaching the rank of commander in 1945. In 1944, while participating in the D-Day landings at Normandy, he assisted in the building of the Mulberry Docks. Endt retired from the US Navy Reserves in May 1953.
