= Karl-Robert Ameln =

Swedish sailor (1919–2016)

Olympic medal record

Sailing

Representing Sweden
Bronze medal – third place	1948 London	6 metre class

Karl-Robert Ameln (4 September 1919 – 1 April 2016) was a Swedish sailor who competed in the 1948 Summer Olympics and in the 1952 Summer Olympics. He was born in Stockholm. In 1948 he won the bronze medal as a crew member of the Swedish boat Ali Baba II in the 6 metre class. Four years later he finished fourth as a crew member of the Swedish boat May Be II in the 6 metre class event.

Ameln died in Stockholm.
