= Ernst Westerlund =

Finnish sailer

Olympic medal record

Men's Sailing
Bronze medal – third place	1952 Helsinki	6 metre class

Ernst Westerlund (18 March 1893 – 13 October 1961) was a Finnish sailor who competed in the 1948 Summer Olympics and in the 1952 Summer Olympics.
