= Rolf Turkka =

Finnish sailor

Olympic medal record

Men's Sailing
Bronze medal – third place	1952 Helsinki	6 metre class

Rolf Turkka (original surname Durchman; 30 August 1915 – 29 November 1989) was a Finnish sailor who was born in Lahti and died in Espoo. He competed in the 1948 Summer Olympics and in the 1952 Summer Olympics.
