= Ragnar Jansson =

Finnish sailor (1908–1977)

Olympic medal record

Men's Sailing
Bronze medal – third place	1952 Helsinki	6 metre class

Ragnar Jansson (1 October 1908 – 9 September 1977) was a Finnish sailor who competed in the 1948 Summer Olympics and in the 1952 Summer Olympics.
