= Owen Torrey =

American sailor

Owen Cates Torrey, Jr. (October 31, 1925 – February 13, 2001) was an American competitive sailor and Olympic medalist. He won a bronze medal in the Swallow class at the 1948 Summer Olympics in London, together with Lockwood Pirie. Among the many accomplishments of Mr. Torrey, in the 1988 Vineyard Race, he navigated the IOR one-tonner Ragtime, along with skipper John Georges, John Logue, Andrew Vare and Scott Stone, to first in class and first overall.

He graduated from Harvard University and Columbia Law School.
