= Rodolfo Rivademar =

Argentine sailor

Medal record

Sailing

Representing Argentina

Olympic Games
| Silver medal – second place | 1948 London | 6m class |

Rodolfo Rivademar (October 27, 1919 – October 15, 2013) was an Argentine sailor and Olympic medalist. He was a member of the Argentine crew on Djinn that received a silver medal in the 6 metre class at the 1948 Summer Olympics in London.
