= Rufino Rodríguez de la Torre =

Argentine sailor

Medal record

Sailing

Representing Argentina

Olympic Games
Silver medal – second place	1948 London	6 metre class

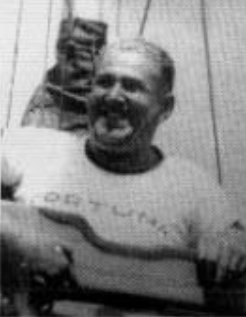
Rufino Rodríguez de la Torre

Rufino Rodríguez de la Torre (born 2 December 1902, date of death unknown) was an Argentine sailor. He won a silver medal in the 6 metre class at the 1948 Summer Olympics.
