= James H. Smith Jr. =

American sailor

James Smith

Director of the International Cooperation Administration
- In office October 8, 1957 – January 31, 1959
- President: Dwight Eisenhower
- Preceded by: John Hollister
- Succeeded by: James Riddleberger

Assistant Secretary of the Navy for Air
- In office July 23, 1953 – June 20, 1956
- President: Dwight Eisenhower
- Preceded by: John F. Floberg
- Succeeded by: Garrison Norton

Personal details
- Born: James Hopkins Smith Jr. December 15, 1909 New York City, New York, U.S.
- Died: November 24, 1982 (aged 72) San Diego, California, U.S.
- Party: Republican
- Education: Harvard University (BA); Columbia University (LLB)
- Sports career
Medal record
Sailing
Representing the United States
Olympic Games
Gold medal – first place	1948 London	6 Metre

James Hopkins Smith Jr. (December 15, 1909 – November 24, 1982) was United States Assistant Secretary of the Navy (AIR) from 1953 to 1956 and then was head of the United States Agency for International Development from 1957 to 1959.

== Biography ==
Smith was born in New York City on December 15, 1909. His mother was the first female member of the Republican National Committee. He was educated at the Groton School and then at Harvard University, receiving a bachelor's degree in 1931. In December 1927, Smith learned how to fly a Curtiss JN-4 under the instruction of Charles Lindbergh, recently returned from his transatlantic flight. Upon graduating from college, Smith enrolled in the United States Navy Reserve, and the next year attended Columbia Law School, receiving a law degree in 1932, although he never went on to practice law.

In 1933, Smith enlisted in the United States Navy and was a naval aviator from 1933 to 1941. In 1941, he joined Pan American World Airways as manager of PanAm's operations in Africa. In 1943, he returned to active service; he served in the Navy for another ten years, retiring in 1953, having attained the rank of captain. During this period, Smith acquired the North Star Ranch outside Aspen, Colorado.

He competed at the 1948 Summer Olympics in London in the sailing competitions, where he won a gold medal in the 6 metre class with the boat Llanoria.

In 1953, President of the United States Dwight D. Eisenhower named Smith Assistant Secretary of the Navy (AIR) and Smith held this office from July 23, 1953, until June 20, 1956. In 1954, Smith publicly admitted that the Navy had wrongly suspended Abraham Chasanow as a security risk in July 1953 and issued Chasanow a public apology for the "grave injustice" perpetrated on Chasanow, and vowing to overhaul security procedures.

After resigning in 1956, Smith moved to his ranch in Colorado to pursue life as a rancher, but the next year President Eisenhower asked him to head the United States Agency for International Development and he returned to Washington, D. C. in that capacity until his resignation in 1959. Smith supported a strong foreign aid program, arguing to critics in the United States Congress that the ultimate goal of foreign aid must be not to win friends for the United States, but to allow poorer countries to become totally free of foreign domination.

After a two-year battle with cancer, Smith died at a hospital in La Jolla, San Diego, California on November 24, 1982. He was survived by his wife, Diane; a son, Morgan, and three daughters, Joy, Dinah and Sandra.

== Sources ==
- Kathleen Teltsch, "James H. Smith Jr.; Led U.S. Aid Agency," The New York Times, November 25, 1982.
- James Smith papers at the Dwight D. Eisenhower Presidential Library Archived August 9, 2011, at the Wayback Machine
- Evans, Hilary; Gjerde, Arild; Heijmans, Jeroen; Mallon, Bill; et al. "James Smith". Olympics at Sports-Reference.com. Sports Reference LLC. Archived from the original on January 31, 2012.

Political offices
Preceded by John F. Floberg	Assistant Secretary of the Navy for Air; 1953–1956	Succeeded by Garrison Norton
Diplomatic posts
Preceded by John Hollister	Director of the International Cooperation Administration; 1957–1959	Succeeded by James Riddleberger
