= Stewart Morris =

British sailor

Medal record

Men's sailing

Representing United Kingdom

Olympic Games
Gold medal – first place	1948 London	Swallow

Stewart Morris, OBE, (25 May 1909 – 24 February 1991) was a British sailor, born in Bromley, Kent. He competed at the 1948 Summer Olympics in London and won a gold medal in the Swallow class with David Bond.

Stewart was educated at Charterhouse and Trinity College, Cambridge. He was a member of the Cambridge University Cruising Club and sailed against Oxford three times in 1928-30. He remained a bachelor and devoted his life to sailing, while continuing to run the seasonal family hop business in East London. He was instrumental in founding the Oxford & Cambridge Sailing Society and continually promoted team racing in the UK and internationally.

Stewart raced his Olympic boat, Swift, in later years at Itchenor Sailing Club in Chichester Harbour where he won the Nationals and Cowes week numerous times. He also lived in Itchenor after he retired from business. However, the real passion of Stewart's life, from his undergraduate days onwards, was the International 14 dinghy. His record of success in the class is unrivalled and he was 12 times winner of the Prince of Wales (PoW) Cup: 1932 Torbay in R.I.P. K267; 1933 Lowestoft in R.I.P. K267; 1935 Cowes in Alarm K347; 1936 Clyde in Alarm K347; 1947 Hunstanton in Martlet K507; 1948 Cowes in Martlet K507; 1949 Torbay in Martlet K507; 1957 Hunstanton in Bolero K667; 1960 Falmouth in Bolero K667; 1961 Whitstable in Gossip K767; 1962 Weymouth in Gossip K767; and 1965 Scarborough in Encore K847. He had Half models of every 14 he had owned adorning the walls of his itchenor house.

Stewart served as an officer and as a committee member of a great many sailing clubs and organisations. He was Rear Commodore of the Royal Yacht Squadron and Vice Chairman of the Royal Yachting Association for many years.

He served as Commander in the RNVR during the Second World War.
