= Herman Whiton =

American sailor

Personal information
- Full name: Herman Frasch Whiton
- Nationality: American

Sport

Sailing career
- Class: 6 Metre
- College team: Princeton University
Medal record
Sailing
Representing United States
Olympic Games
Gold medal – first place	1948 London	6 Metre
Gold medal – first place	1952 Helsinki	6 Metre
- Updated on 18 March 2015

Herman Frasch Whiton (April 6, 1904 – September 6, 1967) was the son of Henry Devereux Whiton and Frieda Frasch. He was an American sailor and Olympic champion. He was born in Cleveland to Henry Devereux Whiton and Frieda Frasch, heiress to the Union Sulpher Company. He was also the grandson of inventor and entrepreneur Herman Frasch and died in New York City. He was married to Emelyn Thatcher Whiton from 1939 to 1957. On Jan 15, 1958, Herman married Katherine M. O'Brien, 41 years of age.

He graduated from Princeton University. After graduating he was a supporter of the university's Physics Department, and was instrumental in its acquisition of a Synchrotron.

He served as President and Chairman of the Board of the Union Sulphur Company until 1952.

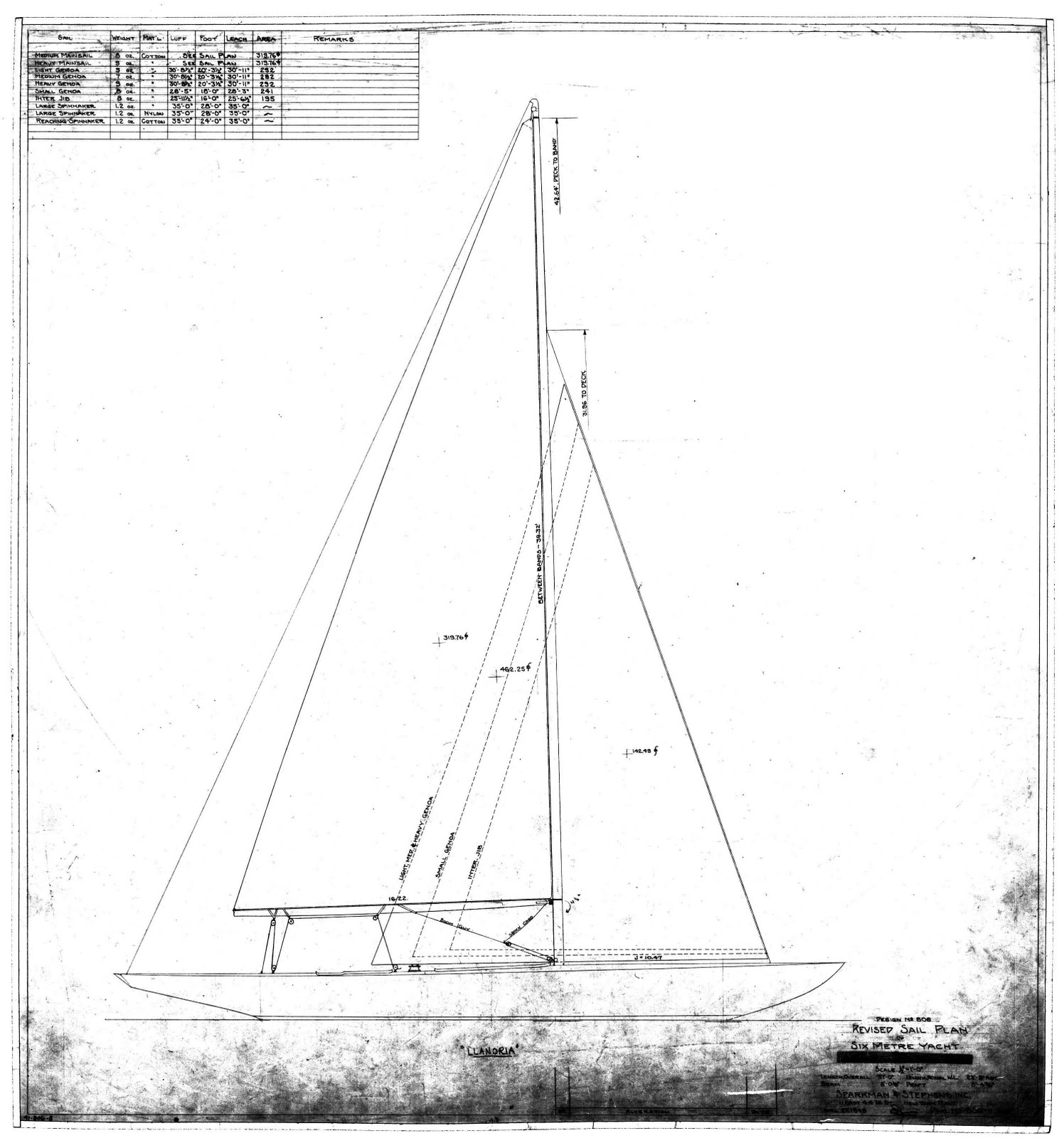
Plan of the yacht Llanoria

He competed at the 1948 Summer Olympics in London, where he won a gold medal in the 6 metre class with the boat 'Llanoria'. At the 1952 Summer Olympics in Helsinki he won a gold medal with the same boat Llanoria, but with a different crew that included his wife Emelyn Whiton.

He also twice won the Scandinavian Gold Cup in the 6 metre class.

== See also ==
- List of Princeton University Olympians
