= Sailing at the 1960 Summer Olympics – 5.5 Metre =

Sailing at the Olympics

5.5 Metre at the Games of the XVII Olympiad
- Olympic Configuration 1960
- Venue: Naples
- Competitors: 57 from 19 nations
- Teams: 19

Medalists
1st place, gold medalist(s)		George O'Day; James Hunt; David Smith	United States
2nd place, silver medalist(s)		William Berntsen; Søren Hancke; Steen Christensen	Denmark
3rd place, bronze medalist(s)		Henri Copponex; Manfred Metzger; Pierre Girard	Switzerland

The 5.5 Metre was a sailing event on the Sailing at the 1960 Summer Olympics program in Naples. Seven races were scheduled. 57 sailors, on 19 boats, from 19 nations competed.

== Results ==
Rank	Helmsman (Country)	Crew	Yachtname	Sail No.	Race I		Race II		Race III		Race IV		Race V		Race VI		Race VII		Total Points	Total -1
Rank	Helmsman (Country)	Crew	Yachtname	Sail No.	Rank	Points	Rank	Points	Rank	Points	Rank	Points	Rank	Points	Rank	Points	Rank	Points	Total Points	Total -1
1st place, gold medalist(s)	George O'Day (USA)	James Hunt; David Smith	Minotaur	US; 26	2	1079	4	778	1	1380	3	903	1	1380	~~7~~	~~535~~	1	1380	7435	6900
2nd place, silver medalist(s)	William Berntsen (DEN)	Søren Hancke; Steen Christensen	Web II	D 10	1	1380	5	681	5	681	1	1380	10	380	~~8~~	~~477~~	2	1079	6058	5678
3rd place, bronze medalist(s)	Henri Copponex (SUI)	Pierre Girard; Manfred Metzger	Ballerina IV	Z 37	3	903	1	1380	4	778	5	681	8	477	3	903	~~13~~	~~266~~	5388	5122
4	Roberto Sieburger (ARG)	Carlos Sieburger; Enrique Sieburger, Jr.	Ardilla	A 2	~~9~~	~~426~~	2	1079	6	602	2	1079	5	681	9	426	7	535	4828	4402
5	Bengt Sjösten (SWE)	Claes Turitz; Göran Witting	Iasha	S 29	6	602	6	602	7	535	~~8~~	~~477~~	11	338	1	1380	5	681	4615	4277
6	Robin Aisher (GBR)	George Nicholson; John Ruggles	Yeoman VII	K 10	10	380	~~DSQ~~	~~0~~	3	903	11	338	2	1079	5	681	9	426	3807	3807
7	Finn Ferner (NOR)	Odd Harsheim; Knut Wang	Struten	N 18	~~14~~	~~234~~	3	903	10	380	7	535	4	778	13	266	3	903	3999	3765
8	Robert Symonette (BAH)	Basil Kelly; George Roy Ramsay	John B	BA; 1	7	535	13	266	11	338	~~15~~	~~204~~	6	602	2	1079	15	204	3228	3024
9	Herbert Scholl (EUA)	Hans Baars-Lindner; Karl-August Stolze	Bronia	G 7	~~16~~	~~176~~	8	477	9	426	10	380	3	903	14	234	6	602	3198	3022
10	Jock Sturrock (AUS)	David Bingham; Ernest Wagstaff	Buraddoo	KA; 5	4	778	12	301	2	1079	13	266	14	234	12	301	~~18~~	~~124~~	3083	2959
11	Pietro Reggio (ITA)	Franco Zucchi; Marco Novaro	Voloira II	I 27	12	301	10	380	8	477	6	602	9	426	11	338	~~14~~	~~234~~	2758	2524
12	Bert Darrell (BER)	Walter J. Jones; Norman C. Jones	Bermudes	KB; 2	17	149	7	535	~~DNF~~	~~101~~	18	124	7	535	4	778	16	176	2398	2297
13	Eusebio Bertrand (ESP)	Jorge Martí; Juan Antonio Ragué	Posillipo III	E l	13	266	9	426	~~17~~	~~149~~	12	301	17	149	6	602	12	301	2194	2045
14	Viktor Gorlov (URS)	Konstantin Melgunov; Pavel Parshin	Viktorija	SR; 89	11	338	16	176	12	301	9	426	13	266	~~17~~	~~149~~	8	477	2133	1984
15	Peter Tallberg (FIN)	Fredrik Eklöf; Peik Gästrin	Inga-lill XXXXIIII	L 20	15	204	14	234	13	266	~~16~~	~~176~~	12	301	10	380	10	380	1941	1765
16	Duarte Bello (POR)	Fernando Bello; Júlio Gourinho	Ciocca III	P 18	~~19~~	~~101~~	15	204	15	204	4	778	15	204	16	176	19	101	1768	1667
17	Gotfrid Köchert (AUT)	Erich Moritz; Gerhard Huska	Surprise	OE; 4	8	477	11	338	16	176	14	234	~~19~~	~~101~~	DNF	101	11	338	1765	1664
18	Jacques Lebrun (FRA)	Louis Chauvot; Pierre Buret	Snowten III	F 16	~~18~~	~~124~~	17	149	14	234	17	149	18	124	15	204	4	778	1762	1638
19	Mel Gould (CAN)	Jerome Conway; Barclay Livingstone	Saga II	KC; 14	5	681	~~DNF~~	~~101~~	18	124	19	101	16	176	DNF	101	17	149	1433	1332

DNF = Did not finish, DNS= Did not start, DSQ = Disqualified
= Male, = Female

=== Daily standings ===
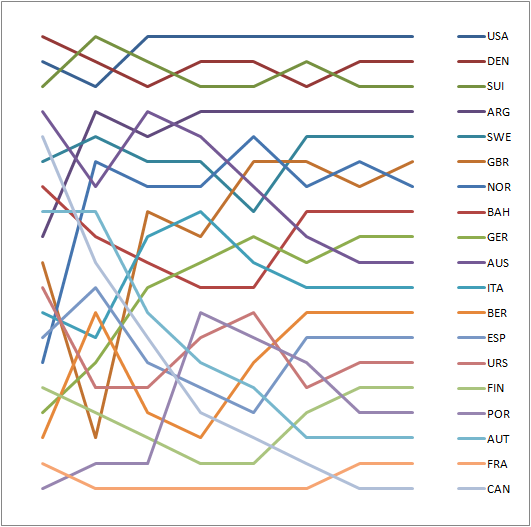
Graph showing the daily standings in the 5.5 Metre during the 1960 Summer Olympics

== Conditions at Naples ==
Of the total of three race areas were needed during the Olympics in Naples. Each of the classes was using the same scoring system. The Southern course was used for the 5.5 Metre.

Date	Race	Sea	Wind direction	Wind speed (m/s)
29 August 1960	I	Calm	SSW	4-5
30 August 1960	II	Calm	SW	3
31 August 1960	III	Slightly rough	W	6-8
1 September 1960	IV	Calm	SSW	3
5 September 1960	V	Calm	SSW	4-5
6 September 1960	VI	Sea force two	WSW	7-8
7 September 1960	VII	Sea force 1	W	2-3
