= Sailing at the 1952 Summer Olympics – 5.5 Metre =

Sailing at the Olympics

5.5 Metre at the Games of the XV Olympiad
- Medalists
- Venue: Harmaja
- Dates: 20–28 July
- Competitors: 50 from 16 nations
- Teams: 16

Medalists
1st place, gold medalist(s)		Britton Chance; Michael Schoettle; Edgar White; Sumner White	United States
2nd place, silver medalist(s)		Peder Lunde; Vibeke Lunde; Børre Falkum-Hansen	Norway
3rd place, bronze medalist(s)		Folke Wassén; Carl-Erik Ohlson; Magnus Wassén	Sweden

The 5.5 Metre was a sailing event on the Sailing at the 1952 Summer Olympics program in Harmaja. Seven races were scheduled. 50 sailors, on 16 boats, from 16 nations competed.

== Results ==
Rank	Helmsman (Country)	Crew	Yachtname	Race I		Race II		Race III		Race IV		Race V		Race VI		Race VII		Total Points	Total -1
Rank	Helmsman (Country)	Crew	Yachtname	Rank	Points	Rank	Points	Rank	Points	Rank	Points	Rank	Points	Rank	Points	Rank	Points	Total Points	Total -1
1st place, gold medalist(s)	Britton Chance (USA)	Michael Schoettle; Edgar White; Sumner White	Complex II	4	703	1	1305	10	305	~~11~~	~~264~~	3	828	1	1305	1	1305	6015	5751
2nd place, silver medalist(s)	Peder Lunde (NOR)	Vibeke Lunde; Børre Falkum-Hansen	Encore	2	1004	5	606	2	1004	2	1004	~~10~~	~~305~~	2	1004	4	703	5630	5325
3rd place, bronze medalist(s)	Folke Wassén (SWE)	Carl-Erik Ohlson; Magnus Wassén	Hojwa	1	1305	~~10~~	~~305~~	1	1305	3	828	7	460	9	351	13	191	4745	4554
4	Duarte de Almeida Bello (POR)	Fernando Pinto Coelho Bello; Júlio De Sousa Leite Gourinho	Sjöhäxa	6	527	4	703	5	606	1	1305	~~8~~	~~402~~	4	703	5	606	4852	4450
5	Rodolfo Vollenweider (ARG)	Tomás Galfrascoli; Ludovico Kempter	Gullvinge	3	828	~~9~~	~~351~~	4	703	7	460	2	1004	7	460	6	527	4333	3982
6	Robert Perry (GBR)	John Dillon; Neil Aylmer Kennedy-Cochran-Patrick	Unique	~~11~~	~~264~~	11	264	7	460	5	606	1	1305	11	264	3	828	3991	3727
7	Noel Horsfield (RSA)	Joe Ellis-Brown; Eric Beningfield	Shoveller	12	226	~~13~~	~~191~~	3	828	6	527	6	527	3	828	8	402	3529	3338
8	Hans Dittmar (FIN)	Aarne Castrén; Erik Stadigh	Teresita	8	402	3	828	~~12~~	~~226~~	10	305	9	351	8	402	2	1004	3518	3292
9	Hans Lubinus (GER)	Hans-Hermann Magnussen; Ludwig Bielenberg	Tom Kyle	7	460	~~14~~	~~159~~	8	402	8	402	4	703	6	527	9	351	3004	2845
10	Dario Salata (ITA)	Giorgio Audizio; Egone Jakin	Mirtala	9	351	6	527	9	351	4	703	~~13~~	~~191~~	12	226	7	460	2809	2618
11	Poul Ohff (DEN)	Henning Christensen; Ingemann Bylling Jensen	Jill	5	606	7	460	~~DNF~~	~~0~~	13	191	5	606	5	606	DSQ	0	2469	2469
12	Henri Copponex (SUI)	Markus Schurch; Pierre Chuit	Tam-Tam II	13	191	2	1004	~~DSQ~~	~~0~~	14	159	15	129	13	191	DSQ	0	1674	1674
13	Wim de Vries Lentsch (NED)	Flip Keegstra; Piet Jan van der Giessen	De Ruyter	~~14~~	~~159~~	8	402	11	264	12	226	14	159	10	305	12	226	1741	1582
14	Jean Roux-Delimal (FRA)	Jacques Allard; Noël Calone	Damoiselle	10	305	~~16~~	~~101~~	6	527	15	129	16	101	15	129	11	264	1556	1455
15	Don Pritchard (BAH)	Basil McKinney; Basil Trevor Kelly; Godfrey Higgs	Yeoman	15	129	12	226	13	191	9	351	12	226	~~16~~	~~101~~	10	305	1529	1428
16	Konstantin Aleksandrov (URS)	Lev Alekseyev; Pavel Pankrashkin	Burevestnik	~~16~~	~~101~~	15	129	14	159	16	101	11	264	14	159	14	159	1072	971

DNF = Did Not Finish, DNS= Did Not Start, DSQ = Disqualified
= Male, = Female

=== Daily standings ===
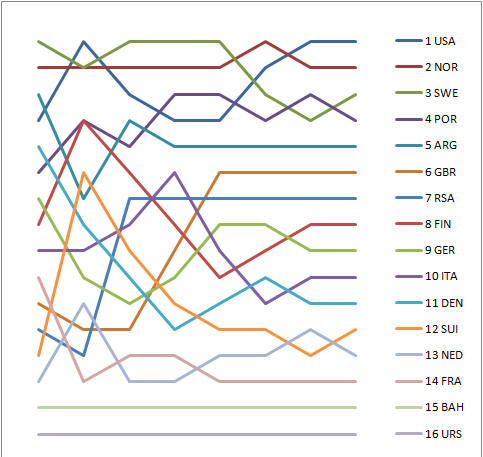
Graph showing the daily standings in the 5.5 Metre during the 1952 Summer Olympics

== Conditions at Harmaja ==
Of the total of three race area's only two were needed during the Olympics in Harmaja. Each of the classes was using the same scoring system.

Date	Race	Sky	Wind direction	Wind speed (m/s)
20 July 1952	I	Grand yachting weather	SW	6-7
21 July 1952	II	Calm sea, later rain	SW	1-2 later 6-7
22 July 1952	III	Magnificent seas	SW	10
23 July 1952	IV		Shifty	3-4
26 July 1952	V	Rainy	SW	3-6
27 July 1952	VI		SW	4-6
28 July 1952	VII	Fine and sunny	Shifty	Light
