= Sailing at the 1956 Summer Olympics – 5.5 Metre =

Sailing at the Olympics

5.5 Metre at the Games of the XVI Olympiad
- Medallists
- Venue: Port Phillip
- Dates: 26–29 November and 3–5 December
- Competitors: 33 from 10 nations
- Teams: 10

Medalists
1st place, gold medalist(s)		Lars Thörn; Hjalmar Karlsson; Sture Stork	Sweden
2nd place, silver medalist(s)		Robert Perry; Neil Cochran Patrick; John Dillon; David Bowker	Great Britain
3rd place, bronze medalist(s)		Jock Sturrock; Devereaux Mytton; Douglas Buxton	Australia

The 5.5 Metre was a sailing event in the sailing program of the 1956 Summer Olympics, held on Port Phillip. Seven races were scheduled. 33 sailors, on 10 boats, from 10 nations competed.

== Results ==
Rank	Helmsman (Country)	Crew	Yachtname	Race I		Race II		Race III		Race IV		Race V		Race VI		Race VII		Total Points	Total -1
Rank	Helmsman (Country)	Crew	Yachtname	Rank	Points	Rank	Points	Rank	Points	Rank	Points	Rank	Points	Rank	Points	Rank	Points	Total Points	Total -1
1st place, gold medalist(s)	Lars Thörn (SWE)	Hjalmar Karlsson; Sture Stork	Rush V.	~~5~~	~~402~~	1	1101	1	1101	3	624	2	800	1	1101	2	800	5929	5527
2nd place, silver medalist(s)	Robert Perry (GBR)	Neil Cochran-Patrick; John Dillon; David Graham Bowker	Vision	3	624	2	800	~~7~~	~~256~~	1	1101	4	499	5	402	3	624	4306	4050
3rd place, bronze medalist(s)	Jock Sturrock (AUS)	Devereaux Mytton; Douglas Buxton	Buraddoo	~~4~~	~~499~~	4	499	2	800	4	499	1	1101	3	624	4	499	4521	4022
4	Andy Schoettle (USA)	Victor Sheronas; John Bryant; Robert Stinson	Rush IV.	2	800	3	624	3	624	2	800	6	323	2	800	~~8~~	~~198~~	4169	3971
5	Peder Lunde (NOR)	Odd Harsheim; Halfdan Ditlev-Simonsen Jr.	Viking	1	1101	7	256	6	323	5	402	3	624	~~8~~	~~198~~	1	1101	4005	3807
6	Albert Cadot (FRA)	Jean-Jacques Herbulot; Dominique Perroud	Gilliatt V.	10	101	6	323	~~DSQ~~	~~0~~	8	198	7	256	4	499	5	402	1779	1779
7	Massimo Oberti (ITA)	Antonio Carattino; Carlo Maria Spirito; Antonio Cosentino	Twins VIII.	9	147	5	402	5	402	6	323	9	147	7	256	~~DNF~~	~~0~~	1677	1677
8	Konstantin Alexandrov (URS)	Konstantin Melgounov; Lev Alexeev	Druzhba	7	256	9	147	9	147	~~DNF~~	~~0~~	5	402	6	323	6	323	1598	1598
9	Leslie Noel Horsfield (RSA)	Denis Hegarty; Geoffrey Vivian Myburgh	Yeoman V.	6	323	8	198	4	499	~~DNF~~	~~0~~	8	198	10	101	7	256	1575	1575
10	Hans Johann Georg Lubinus (EUA)	Adolf Stein; Ludwig Bielenberg	Tilly	8	198	~~10~~	~~101~~	8	198	7	256	10	101	9	147	9	147	1148	1047

DNF = Did not finish, DNS= Did not start, DSQ = Disqualified
= Male, = Female

=== Daily standings ===
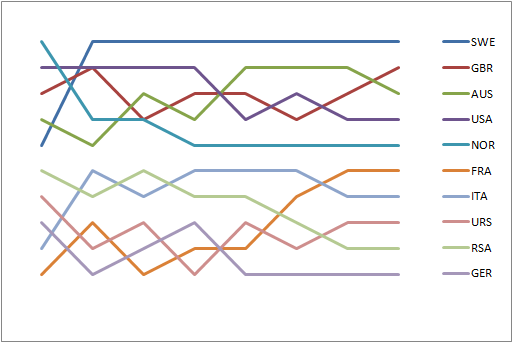
Graph showing the daily standings in the 5.5 Metre during the 1956 Summer Olympics

== Conditions on Port Phillip ==
Three race areas were needed during the Olympics on Port Phillip. Each class used the same scoring system. The center course was used for the 5.5 Metre.
