= Sailing at the 1960 Summer Olympics =

Sailing at the Games of the XVII Olympiad
- Venues: Gulf of Naples
- Dates: First race: 29 August 1960 (Meulan); Last race: 7 September 1960
- Competitors: 287 from 46 nations
- Boats: 138

Sailing/Yachting is an Olympic sport starting from the Games of the 1st Olympiad (1896 Olympics in Athens, Greece). With the exception of 1904 and the canceled 1916 Summer Olympics, sailing has always been included on the Olympic schedule. The Sailing program of 1960 consisted of a total of five sailing classes (disciplines). For each class seven races were scheduled from 29 August 1960 to 7 September 1960 off the coast of Naples at the Gulf of Naples.

The sailing was done on the triangular type Olympic courses. The start was made in the center of a set of 8 numbered marks that were places in a circle. During the starting procedure the sequence of the marks was communicated to the sailors. By picking the mark that was most upwind the start could always be made upwind. This system is, at least in certain German lakes, still in use.

== Venue ==
Port of S. Lucia
- Interactive map of Port of S. Lucia
- Coordinates: 40°49′35.48″N 14°14′57.97″E

In the Gulf of Naples, in the zone overlooking Santa Lucia, three ports were used for launching and mooring of the Olympic classes:

- Mergellina, for Finn (Sea Garden) and Flying Dutchman (Posillipo)
- Borgo Marinari, for Dragons
- Molosiglio, for Star and 5.5 Metre

Three course areas were used:

Area	Principal race officer	Classes	Committee vessel
Azzurro	Marino Tarabocchia	Finn	Gaggia
Giallo	Egisto Picchi	Flying Dutchman; Star	Timo
Rosso	Luigi Mino Poggi	Dragon; 5.5 Metre	Giaggiolo

== Competition ==
=== Overview ===
Continents	Countries	Classes	Boats	Male	Female
5	46	5	138	287	0

=== Continents ===
- Africa
- Asia
- Oceania
- Europe
- Americas

=== Countries ===
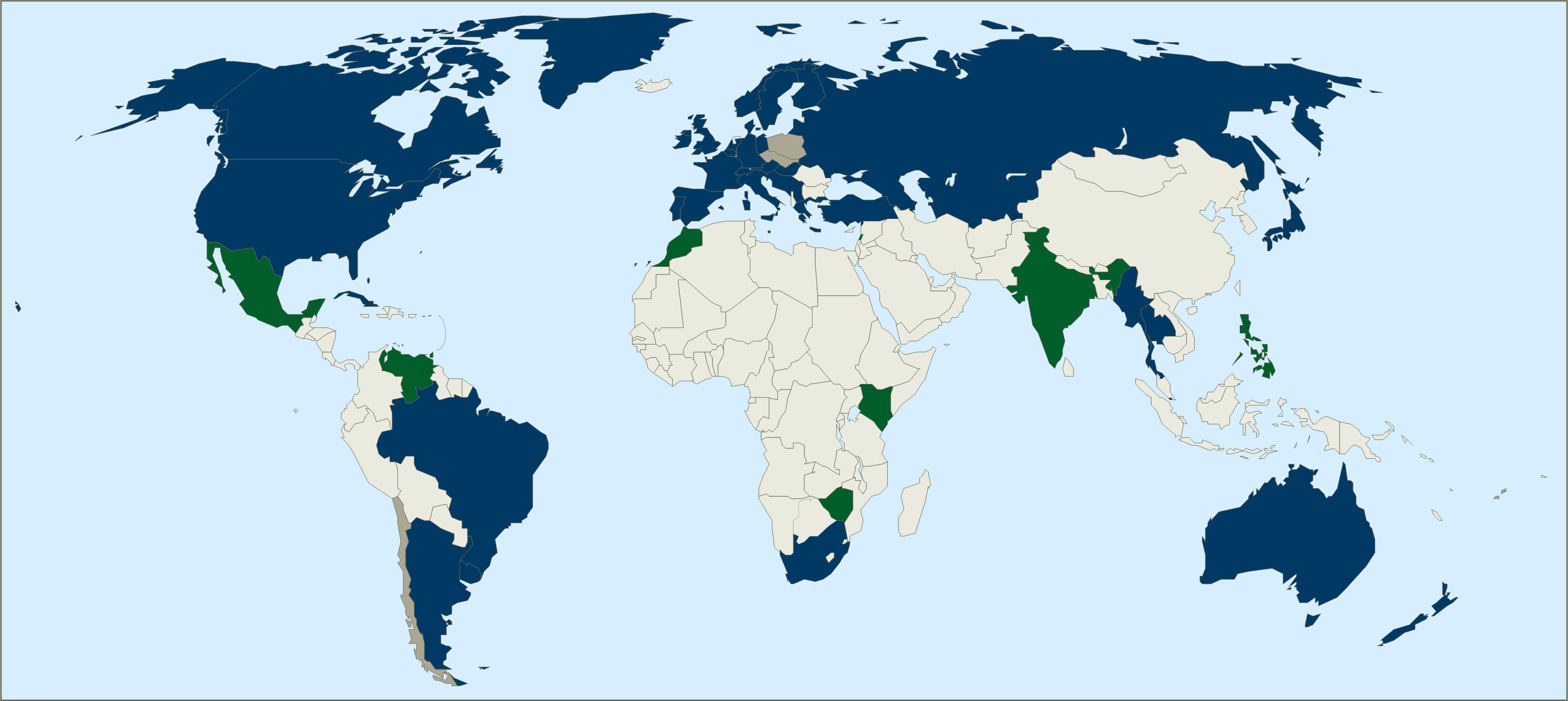
Countries that participated in the Sailing event of the 1960 Olympic Games. Blue: Water Gray: Never participated in OG Dark Gray: Participated in earlier OG Green: Country participated for the first time Dark Blue: Country participated also on previous games Red: Country boycotted the sailing event of the OG

== Participating nations ==
- Argentina (9)
- Australia (11)
- Austria (8)
- Bahamas (11)
- Belgium (3)
- Bermuda (9)
- Brazil (5)
- British West Indies (2)
- Burma (3)
- Canada (11)
- Cuba (2)
- Denmark (9)
- Finland (9)
- France (11)
- United Team of Germany (12)
- Great Britain (11)
- Greece (8)
- Hungary (5)
- Indonesia (5)
- Ireland (6)
- Italy (11)
- Japan (6)
- Kenya (3)
- Lebanon (3)
- Malta (3)
- Mexico (2)
- Monaco (3)
- Morocco (1)
- Netherlands (7)
- New Zealand (3)
- Norway (9)
- Philippines (3)
- Portugal (11)
- Rhodesia (2)
- Singapore (3)
- South Africa (3)
- Soviet Union (11)
- Spain (11)
- Sweden (11)
- Switzerland (11)
- Thailand (2)
- Turkey (1)
- United States (11)
- Uruguay (3)
- Venezuela (2)
- Yugoslavia (3)

=== Classes (equipment) ===
Class	Type	Event	Sailors	Trapeze	Mainsail	Jib/Genoa	Spinnaker	First OG	Olympics so far
Finn	Dinghy		1	0	+	–	–	1952	3
Flying Dutchman	Dinghy		2	1	+	+	+	1960	1
Star	Keelboat		2	0	+	+	–	1932	6
Dragon	Keelboat		3	0	+	+	+	1948	4
5.5 Metre	Keelboat		3	0	+	+	+	1952	3

= Male, = Female, = Open

1960 Olympic Classes designs

== Medal summary ==
Event	Gold	Silver	Bronze
1960: Finn	Denmark (DEN); Paul Elvstrøm	Soviet Union (URS); Aleksander Tšutšelov	Belgium (BEL); André Nelis
1960: Flying Dutchman	Norway (NOR); Peder Lunde Jr. Bjørn Bergvall	Denmark (DEN); Hans Fogh; Ole Erik Petersen	Germany (EUA); Rolf Mulka; Ingo von Bredow
1960: Star	Soviet Union (URS); Timir Pinegin; Fyodor Shutkov	Portugal (POR); Mário Quina; José Manuel Quina	United States (USA); William Parks; Robert Halperin
1960: Dragon	Greece (GRE); Crown Prince Constantine; Odysseus Eskidioglou; Georgios Zaimis	Argentina (ARG); Jorge Salas Chávez; Héctor Calegaris; Jorge del Río Salas	Italy (ITA); Antonio Cosentino; Antonio Ciciliano; Giulio De Stefano
1960: 5.5 Metre	United States (USA); George O'Day; James Hunt; David Smith	Denmark (DEN); William Berntsen; Steen Christensen; Sören Hancke	Switzerland (SUI); Henri Copponex; Pierre Girard; Manfred Metzger

== Medal table ==
Rank	Nation	Gold	Silver	Bronze	Total
1	Denmark	1	2	0	3
2	Soviet Union	1	1	0	2
3	United States	1	0	1	2
4	Greece	1	0	0	1
4	Norway	1	0	0	1
6	Argentina	0	1	0	1
6	Portugal	0	1	0	1
8	Belgium	0	0	1	1
8	Italy	0	0	1	1
8	Switzerland	0	0	1	1
8	United Team of Germany	0	0	1	1
Totals (11 entries)		5	5	5	15

== Remarks ==
=== Measurement ===
Measurement at the Olympics became more and more professional.

=== Sailing ===
- Again this Olympic sailing event was gender independent, but turned out to be a Men-only event. This was one of the triggers to create gender specific events. This however had to wait until 1988.
- Since the distance between Rome and Naples a separate organization was created for the Sailing events. The name of this organization was Solo Mio.
- The Italian Navy was responsible for the courses and the towing in and out of the yachts. According to the official report this was done on a very prompt manner. and we quote:

The only accident to occur, which resulted in the loss of the Lebanese Flying Dutchman, cannot be imputed to the method employed by the rescue crew after the boat had overturned, but to the incompetence of the Lebanese F.D. crew who attached the tow cable around a belaying cleat fixed to the deck.

- According to current standards a huge amount of sails was allowed for use during the Olympics (not every boat measured in the maximum number):
  - Finn, 1 sail (for the whole Finn fleet a total of 25 sails were available as spare.)
  - Flying Dutchman, 4 sets of sails (12)
  - Star, 6 sets of sails (12)
  - Dragon 6 sets of sails (18)
  - 5.5 Metre 6 sets of sails (18)
- 106 journalists of 52 countries were reporting the sailing event.
- Many former Olympians acted in the race committee, the International jury or measurement committee. Examples are: Peter Scott, Beppe Croce, Eddy Stutterheim, Jean-Jacques Herbulot and Edgar Beyn.

=== Sailors ===
During the sailing regattas at the 1960 Summer Olympics among others the following persons were competing in the various classes:

- Austria, Gotfrid Köchert, father of actress Bibi Besch and future grandfather of actress Samantha Mathis, in the 5.5 Metre
- Australia, Jock Sturrock in the 5.5 Metre. Appointed flag-bearer of the Australian team at the opening ceremony in Rome, in recognition of becoming the first athlete to represent Australia in four Olympic Games. Later, skippered "Gretel" and "Dame Pattie", the first two Australian challengers for the America's Cup, and in 1962 was awarded the Lindy Award as Australian Sportsman of the year, the Helms Award for Australian Yachtsman of the year, and was honoured as Australian of the Year
- Denmark, Paul Elvstrøm winning his fourth consecutive gold medal, this time in the Finn
- Greece, Crown Prince Constantine winning his first and only gold medal, in the Dragon with two of his teammates. He would become king of Greece (1964–1973) as Constantine II
- Finland, Peter Tallberg, future President of the International Yacht Racing Union (1986–1994), in the 5.5 Metre
- Philippines, Francisco Paula Gonzales, future mass murderer for crashing Pacific Air Lines Flight 773 (1964)
- Thailand, Birabongse Bhanudej, Prince of Thailand, in the Star

== Sources ==
- The Organizing Committee of the Games of the XVII Olympiad (1960). The Games of the XVII Olympiad Rome 1960, The Official Report of the Organizing Committee Volume One (PDF). Archived from the original (pdf) on 27 October 2012.
- The Organizing Committee of the Games of the XVII Olympiad (1960). The Games of the XVII Olympiad Rome 1960, The Official Report of the Organizing Committee Volume Two (a) (PDF). Archived from the original (pdf) on 23 May 2011.
- The Organizing Committee of the Games of the XVII Olympiad (1960). The Games of the XVII Olympiad Rome 1960, The Official Report of the Organizing Committee Volume Two (b) (PDF). Archived from the original (pdf) on 29 October 2012.
- Hugh Drake & Paul Henderson (2009). Canada's Olympic Sailing Legacy, Paris 1924 – Beijing 2008. Toronto: CYA.
- "Rome 1960". Olympics.com. International Olympic Committee.
