= Perroud =

Perroud is a family name of French origin, derived from the given name Pierre. Notable people with this surname include:

- Benoît-Philibert Perroud (1796–1887), French entomologist
- Dominique Perroud (born 1935), French sailor
- Georges Perroud (footballer, born 1928) (1928–2014), Swiss footballer
- Georges Perroud (1941–2023), Swiss footballer
- Jacques François Perroud (1770–1822), French privateer captain
- Jane Hooper-Perroud (bord c.1965), Canadian curler, wife of Pat Perroud
- Pat Perroud (born 1962), Canadian curler, husband of Jane Hooper-Perroud
