= Schoettle =

Schoettle is a surname. Notable people with the surname include:

- Andy Schoettle (1933–2010), American sailor
- Anne Schoettle (born 1959), American television soap opera writer
- Michael Schoettle (born 1936), American sailor
- Erwin Schoettle (born 1976), German politician

== See also ==
- Schoettler
