= Jorge Alberto del Río =

Argentine sailor (born 1918)

Medal record

Sailing

Representing Argentina

Olympic Games
Silver medal – second place	1960 Rome	Three Person Keelboat

Jorge Alberto del Río Salas (born 30 October 1918, date of death unknown) was an Argentine sailor. Born in Buenos Aires, he competed at four Olympics between 1948 and 1964.

Salas won silver at age 46 at the 1960 Olympics in the Mixed Three Person Keelboat (Dragon class), with Héctor Calegaris and his cousin Jorge Alberto Salas Chávez. His team had come fourth in the same event eight years earlier.

Salas is related to the Sieburger sailing clan by marriage. He married Marylin Sieburger – the daughter of Enrique Sieburger, Sr., sister of Carlos and Enrique Sieburger, Jr., cousin of Roberto Sieburger, and niece of Julio Sieburger. Their son Sandro del Río Sieburger is a national Cadet class sailing champion and marathon runner. Salas is deceased.
