= Enrique Sieburger Sr. =

Argentine sailor (1897–1965)

Medal record

Sailing

Representing Argentina

Olympic Games
Silver medal – second place	1948 London	6m class

Enrique Conrado Sieburger (18 November 1897 – 1965) was an Argentine sailor and Olympic medalist. He competed at the 1948 and 1952 Summer Olympics.

Sieburger was a member of the Argentine crew on Djinn that received a silver medal in the 6m class at the 1948 Summer Olympics in London. His teammates included his brother Julio Sieburger and his son Enrique Sieburger (born 1924); meanwhile Julio's son Roberto Sieburger was also competing in a different event (Three Person Keelboat) in the first of his five Olympics.

His sons Carlos Sieburger (1921–1996) and Enrique Sieburger Jr. (1924–1990) raced with his nephew Roberto in the 5.5m class at the 1960 Olympics, coming fourth.

His daughter Marylin married four-time Olympian sailor Jorge del Río Salas, cousin of five-time Olympic sailor Jorge Salas Chávez. Altogether, the combined Sieburger-Salas extended family have twenty Olympic appearances, a record for any family in any sport.
