= Konstantin Aleksandrov =

Konstantin Aleksandrov can refer to:

- Konstantin Aleksandrov (sailor) (1920–1987), Soviet Olympic sailor
- Konstantin Aleksandrov (wrestler) (born 1969), Kyrgyzstani Olympic wrestler
