= Wim de Vries Lentsch =

Dutch sailor (1919-2007)

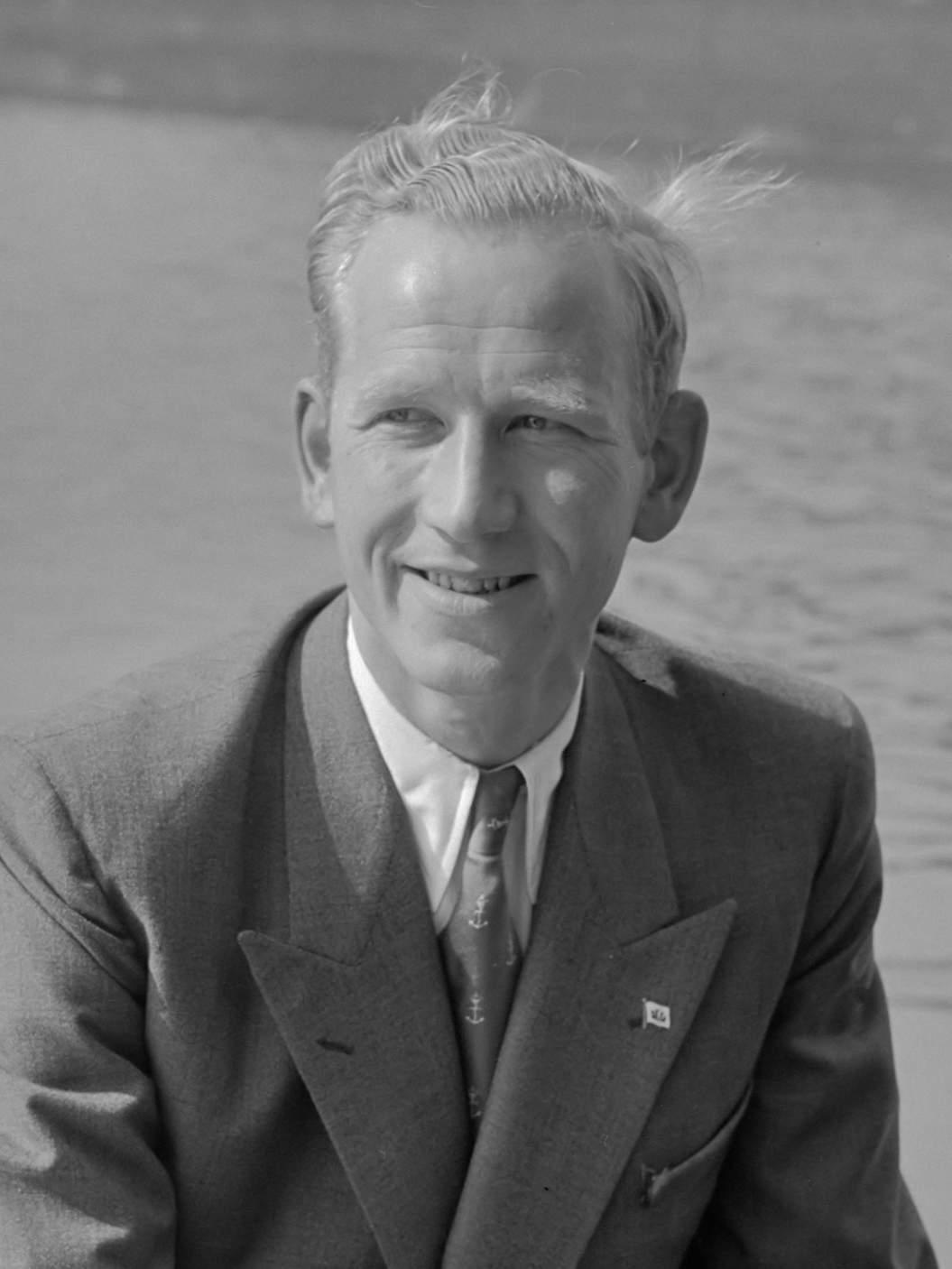
- Willem de Vries Lentsch (1952)

Personal information
- Full name: Willem de Vries Lentsch, Jr.
- Nationality: Dutch
- Born: 31 May 1919 Nieuwendam, Netherlands
- Died: 27 January 2007 (aged 87) Amsterdam, Netherlands

Sailing career
- Sport: Sailing
- Class(es): Swallow; 5.5 Metre
- Updated on 2014-01-04

Willem "Wim" de Vries Lentsch Jr. (20 June 1914 – 27 January 2007) was a Dutch sailor who represented his native country at the 1948 Summer Olympics in Torbay. De Vries Lentsch Jr., as helmsman on the Dutch Swallow St. Margrite, took the 11th place with crew Flip Keegstra. In the 1952 Olympics De Vries Lentsch returned as helmsman of the Dutch 5.5 Metre De Ruyter, with crew members Flip Keegstra and Piet Jan van der Giessen. There he took the 13th place.

Wim de Vries Lentsch was the son of Willem de Vries Lentsch.

== Sources ==
- "Wim de Vries Lentsch Bio, Stats, and Results". Olympic Sports. Sports-Reference.com. Archived from the original on 2020-04-18.
- "DE KEUZEWEDSTRIJDEN VOOR DE OLYMPISCHE SPELEN" (Evening ed.). Nieuwsblad van Friesland : Hepkema's courant. 1946-06-25.
- "Bronzen medailles voor Bob Maas en Koos de Jong" (in Dutch) (Dag ed.). Het vrĳe volk : democratisch-socialistisch dagblad. 1948-08-13.
- "The Official Report of the Organising Committee for the XIV Olympiad London 1948" (PDF). 1951. Archived from the original (PDF) on 2011-07-16.
- "OLYMPISCHE ZEILPLOEG" (Morning ed.). De vrije pers : ochtendbulletin. 1952-06-20.
- "The Officiel Report of the Organizing Committee for the games of the XV Olympiad Helsinki 1952" (PDF). 1955. Archived from the original (pdf) on 2008-04-11.
