= David Bowker =

David Bowker may refer to:

- David Bowker (sailor) (1922–2020), British sailor
- David Bowker (writer), British author and screenwriter
