= Enrique Sieburger Jr. =

Argentine sailor

Medal record

Representing Argentina

Sailing

Olympic Games
Silver medal – second place	1948 London	6m class

Enrique Adolfo Sieburger (10 May 1924 – 23 January 1990) was an Argentine sailor and Olympic medalist. He was born in Vicente López, Buenos Aires Province, Argentina. He competed at the 1948 and 1960 Summer Olympics.

Enrique won the silver medal at the 1948 Summer Olympics.

He was part of a sailing family. His father Enrique Conrado Sieburger and uncle Julio Sieburger both competed at two Olympic Games. He sailed with his brother Carlos Alfredo Sieburger and his cousin (Julio's son) Roberto Guillermo Sieburger to fourth place in the 5.5m class at the 1960 Olympics. His sister Marylin married Jorge del Río Salas, also an Olympic sailor for Argentina. Together with Jorge del Rio's cousin Jorge Salas Chávez, this Sieburger-Salas extended family has sailors who made twenty Olympic appearances for Argentina.
