= David Bingham =

David Bingham may refer to:

- David Bingham (Scottish footballer) (born 1970), Scottish association football player and manager
- David Bingham (American soccer) (born 1989), American soccer goalkeeper
- David Bingham (sailor) (born 1939), Australian Olympic sailor
- David Bingham (engineer), co-founder of semiconductor manufacturer Maxim Integrated
