= Giovanni Lanza (painter) =

Italian painter (1827–1889)

Giovanni Giordano Lanza (April 1827 - in or after 1889) was an Italian painter.

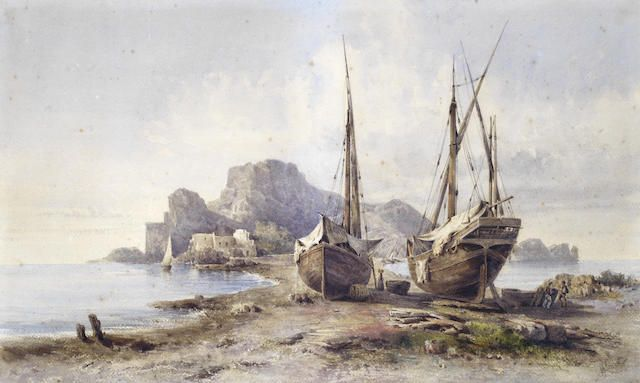
Giovanni Giordano Lanza, Fishing boats

== Biography ==
He was born in Naples, Kingdom of the Two Sicilies. He completed his first studies under professor Giacinto Gigante in Naples. In 1852, his large canvas of The Interior of the church of Santa Chiara was awarded a silver medal. He was commissioned by the Bourbon royal family to paint The interior of the Sacristy of San Martino, which was also awarded a prize. In 1860 by commission of the marchese di Sassenay and for an album of Napoleon III, he completed two watercolors depicting Una veduta della marina di Santa Lucia and An Interior of the Gerolimini. In 1862, he completed by commission by the Prince of Cassero a canvas depicting the Palazzo Reale of Caserta; in 1862 again for the royal family, he completed a Sant'Arcangelo alla Cova; per Vittorio Emanuele, he painted la Veduta della Piazza d'Amalfi; for the Duchess of Genoa Naples of Mergellina. He also completed another canvas depicting The Surroundings of Naples(1875).

Documentation of him in Naples exist as late as 1889.
