= Peder Lunde =

Peder Lunde is the name of:

- Peder Lunde Sr. (1918–2009), Norwegian sailor
- Peder Lunde Jr. (born 1942), Norwegian sailor
