= Roberto Sieburger =

Argentine sailor

Roberto Guillermo Sieburger (26 February 1917 – 20 October 2012) was an Argentine sailor. Born in Buenos Aires, Argentina he competed at five Olympics between 1948 and 1968.

He is part of a sailing family. His father Julio Sieburger and uncle Enrique Sieburger, Sr. both competed at two Olympics. He sailed with his cousins Carlos Sieburger and Enrique Sieburger, Jr. to fourth place in the 5.5m class at the 1960 Olympics. His other cousin, Carlos and Enrique Jr's sister Marylin, married Jorge del Río Sálas, with whom he had sailed (also to fourth place) in the 5.5m class at the 1952 Olympics.

Together with Jorge del Rio's cousin Jorge Salas Chávez, his Sieburger-Salas extended family has sailors who made twenty Olympic appearances for Argentina. He got a doctor's degree on chemistry and used to be an industrial merchant. He married Maria Erlina Allen and had a son, Roberto Eduardo.

== See also ==
- List of athletes with the most appearances at Olympic Games
