= Piet Jan van der Giessen =

Dutch sailor

Personal information
- Full name: Pieter Jan van der Giessen
- Nationality: Dutch
- Born: 1 January 1918 Krimpen aan den IJssel, Netherlands
- Died: 10 June 1993 (aged 75) Krimpen aan den IJssel, Netherlands

Sailing career
- Sport: Sailing
- Class: 5.5 Metre
- Updated on 2014-01-06

Pieter Jan "Piet Jan" van der Giessen (1 January 1918 – 10 June 1993) was a sailor from the Netherlands, who represented his native country as at the 1952 Summer Olympics in Helsinki. Piet Jan, as crew member on the Dutch 5.5 Metre De Ruyter, took the 13th place with helmsman Wim de Vries Lentsch and fellow crew member Flip Keegstra.

== Professional life ==
In his professional life Van der Giessen was one of the owners and founder of the shipyard Van der Giessen de Noord.

== Sources ==
- "Piet Jan van der giessen Bio, Stats, and Results". Olympic Sports. Sports-Reference.com. Archived from the original on 2020-04-18.
- "OLYMPISCHE ZEILPLOEG" (Morning ed.). De vrije pers : ochtendbulletin. 1952-06-20.
- "The Officiel Report of the Organizing Committee for the games of the XV Olympiad Helsinki 1952" (PDF). 1955. Archived from the original (pdf) on 2008-04-11.
