= 1976 Star World Championships =

The 1976 Star World Championships were held in Nassau, Bahamas in 1976.

== Results ==
Results of individual races
Pos	Boat name	Crew	Country	I	II	III	IV	V	VI	Tot
Gold medal	Mustard Seed	James Allsopp (H); Michael Guhin	United States	24	2	1	5	1	4	312
Silver medal	Frolic	Bill Buchan, Jr. (H); Earl Lasher	United States	16	3	4	2	9	2	305
Bronze medal	Suzanne	Barton S. Beek (H); William Munster	United States	1	6	17	6	5	6	301
4	Sanctuary	Malin Burnham (H); Robbie Haines	United States	5	17	3	12	4	1	300
5	Dingo	James M. Schoonmaker (H); David Dickey	United States	2	1	8	DNF	1	13	300
6	Conch	Basil Kelly (H); Steven Kelly	Bahamas	6	4	9	9	6	5	295
7	J. J. Flash	Tom Blackaller (H); Peter Barrett	United States	9	10	10	4	2	13	290
8	Humbug	Pelle Petterson (H); Ingvar Sampson	Sweden	10	14	11	7	3	7	287
9	Elizabeth	James Lippincott (H); Terry Rapp	United States	13	13	5	1	32	9	284
10	Super Rat	Read Ruggles (H); Gary Kelly	United States	14	7	2	16	8	20	278
11	Dolphin VII	Frank Raymond (H); David Lencioni	United States	12	8	15	8	DNF	10	272
12	Big If	Thompson Adams (H); William Richards	United States	8	15	DSQ	3	16	15	268
13	Gem	Durward Knowles (H); Monty Higgs	Bahamas	3	26	13	DNF	14	11	258
14	Riot V	Henry M. Rowan (H); Rick Burgess	United States	20	19	7	27	21	8	250
15	Swift	Lars Berg (H); Richard Berg	Sweden	15	5	18	28	17	29	242
16	American West	William F. Gerard (H); Shendah Gerard	United States	22	24	19	19	13	12	240
17	Spirit	J. M. MacCausland (H); L. Krasowski	United States	39	32	16	13	10	16	238
18	Old Blue Too	Frank Zagarino (H); John Boyer	United States	29	12	6	30	25	17	236
19	Misty	John W. Allen (H); John Ahlquist	United States	19	29	24	18	12	18	234
20	Eagle	David Oberg (H); Wayne Diller	United States	17	18	12	DNF	24	22	232
21	Robin	Larry Whipple (H); James Alexander	United States	4	DSQ	28	15	29	24	225
22	Shrew	William Parks (H); James Machin	United States	25	22	14	24	15	DNS	225
23	Yaws	Ted Rapp (H); Gerald Ford	United States	30	25	DNS	23	27	27	217
24	Sirene	Sune Carlsson (H); Leif Carlsson	Sweden	31	36	23	11	19	26	215
25	Something Else	David Peterson (H); Earl Elms	United States	7	9	DSQ	10	20	DNF	214
26	Humbug XV	Chuck Driscoll (H); Clinton Berkley	United States	34	21	33	32	26	14	199
27	Hot Cargo	John Cram (H); Carl Petersen	United States	28	27	22	36	18	DNF	194
28	Nate	Heinz Nixdorf (H); Josef Pieper	West Germany	33	30	DNF	20	22	28	192
29	Smorgasboat	Tryg Liljestrand (H); Alan Zimmer	United States	18	33	27	34	27	32	188
30	Big Bird	George F. Thomas (H); Charles Hurlbut	United States	11	11	DSQ	DNF	33	19	186
31	Pummel X	Detlef Kuke (H); Regi Schlubach	West Germany	23	16	41	26	37	38	185
32	Rock Sound	Dierk Thomsen (H); Mike Russell	West Germany	49	46	20	14	28	36	181
33	Blast	Hans Prechter (H); Hans Poelt	West Germany	48	42	38	21	23	21	180
34	Ryan's Express	Richard Lippincott (H); Geoffrey Higgs	United States	43	31	36	22	31	25	180
35	Lorbass	Arno Gudrat (H); Manfred Joppich	West Germany	36	41	29	17	42	31	171
36	Lausbub VI	Martin Schwieger (H); Uwe Oelmann	West Germany	38	28	25	29	38	44	167
37	Clementine	Harry Adler (H); Daniel Adler	Brazil	32	34	44	25	56	30	160
38	Tante	Ed Hengstenberg (H); Heiner Fahnenstich	West Germany	52	23	31	35	46	34	156
39	Gem	John Mueller (H); Mark Jamus	United States	26	35	40	43	34	DNF	147
40	Tomte	Ch. Breitenstein (H); Fred Schauvo	Switzerland	35	20	37	47	39	DNF	147
41	Jaws	John Greening (H); Tom Londrigan	United States	42	40	34	33	DNS	33	143
42	Walkabout	Hans J. Ruedel (H); Michael Esselsgroth	West Germany	31	37	21	DNF	40	41	135
43	Yahoo II	Peter Meyer (H); Werner Soenksen	Brazil	56	47	35	DNF	36	27	124
44	Djinn	Frank Gordoa (H); Kip Murray	United States	41	58	42	37	43	42	120
45	Gemini	Peter de Manio (H); Larry Klein	United States	27	DNF	39	31	45	DNS	118
46	Zwidawuran	Albert Sporer (H); Heinz Nersingel	West Germany	45	39	46	38	47	40	117
47	Spankuk II	Chresten Jensen (H); Ebbe Jensen	United States	40	50	53	40	50	43	102
48	Butzi	Rainer R. Roellenbleg (H); Peter Kullmann	West Germany	60	45	30	DNF	52	37	100
49	Night Train	Peter C. Finley (H); Roger Johnson	United States	61	43	48	48	52	37	97
50	Barbara	Thomas Lucke (H); W. Lippincott	United States	47	56	26	DNF	DNF	35	96
51	Blue Chip III	David Gaillard (H); Jack Levedahl	United States	46	48	45	44	49	DNF	93
52	Demon VIII	Kenneth Cole (H); William Wright	United States	53	52	54	39	35	DNF	92
53	Fan-Tas-Tic	Wm. Mitchener (H); David Monroe	United States	59	53	32	DNF	30	DNF	86
54	Raia	Eugene T. McCarthy (H); Glenn McCarthy	United States	37	DNF	56	42	44	DNF	81
55	Raindrop	Randall Wilkin (H); James Hart	United States	21	54	43	DNF	DNF	DNS	77
56	Zig Zag	Thomas D. Drew-Bear (H); Ed Gershey	Venezuela	55	51	55	46	53	46	74
57	Ice Blue Secret	George Szabo, Jr. (H); George Cable	United States	50	57	DNF	41	57	47	73
58	Fug	Austin H. Gibbon (H); James King	United States	54	DNS	47	46	41	DNF	72
59	Delphin	Rudolf Lange (H); Karl Heitzinger	Austria	62	44	52	45	55	DNS	67
60	Yankee Doodle III	Harry W. Walker (H); Gregor Downey	United States	44	49	DNS	49	54	DNF	64
61	Bla-Bla	Hermann Weiler (H); Fritz Girr	West Germany	63	38	50	50	WDR	DNS	59
62	Creepy IV	Michael Young (H); Max Tunbridge	Australia	58	59	51	51	48	DNF	58
63	What If	Kenneth Morton (H); Barbara Morton	United States	57	55	DNF	DNS	DNS	45	38
64	Windward	Ernest Hammer (H); Robert Seltzer	United States	DNS	60	49	DNF	58	DNS	28

Legend: DNF – Did not finish; DNS – Did not start; DSQ – Disqualified; WDR – Withdrew;
