= Victor Sheronas =

American sailor (1909–1981)

Personal information
- Born: January 1, 1909 Waterbury, Connecticut, United States
- Died: June 8, 1981 (aged 72) Haverford, Pennsylvania, United States

Sport
- Sport: Sailing

Victor Sheronas (January 1, 1909 – June 8, 1981) was an American sailor. He competed in the 5.5 Metre event at the 1956 Summer Olympics. He founded the 5.5 Metre class in the U.S.
