= Vollenweider =

Vollenweider is a Swiss surname: A topographic name for someone who lives by a field named as being a pasture reserved for foals, from Middle High German vole ‘foal’ (plural volen) + weide ‘meadow’, ‘pasture’.

- Andreas Vollenweider (born 1953), Swiss musician
- Hans Vollenweider (1908–1940), criminal and last person to be sentenced to death and executed in Switzerland
- Jim Vollenweider (1939–1998), American football halfback
- Richard Vollenweider (1922–2007), Swiss-born Canadian limnologist
- Rodolfo Vollenweider (1917–2009), Argentine sailor
