= Adolf Stein =

German Olympic sailor (1931–2022)

Personal information
- Full name: Adolf Friedrich Stein
- Nationality: German
- Born: 19 January 1931 Kiel, Germany
- Died: 15 July 2022 (aged 91) Kiel, Germany

Sport
- Sport: Sailing

Adolf Friedrich Stein (19 January 1931 – 15 July 2022) was a German sailor. He competed in the 5.5 Metre event at the 1956 Summer Olympics.
