= Borgo Santa Lucia =

Historical coastal neighborhood in Naples, Italy

Coordinates: 40°49′56″N 14°15′00″E

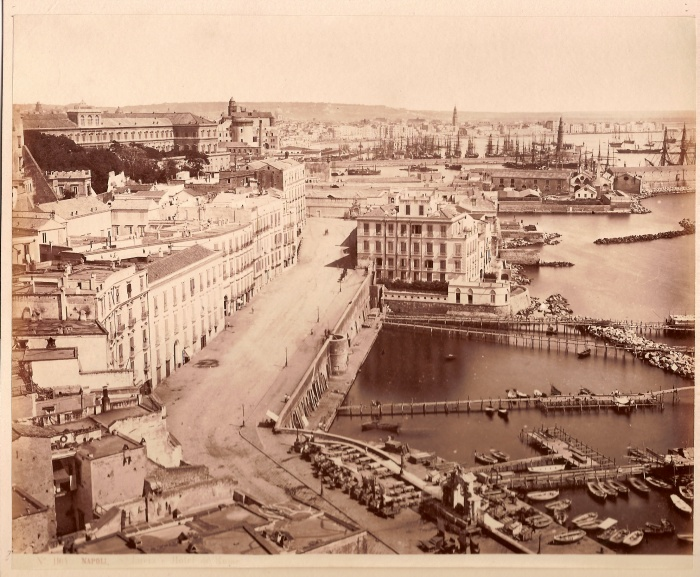
The high part of Santa Lucia street in 1865

Borgo Santa Lucia, or simply Santa Lucia ("Saint Lucy [Borough]"), is a historical rione of Naples, Italy, facing the coast. The area rises around the street of the same name, in turn named after the basilica of Santa Lucia a Mare, the presence of which is attested since the 9th century, in spite of legend that would have it founded by a granddaughter of Constantine I.

== Territory ==
The territory of the ward coincides with that of the parish and extends along via (street) Santa Lucia and Orsini and their cross streets, the Islet of Megaride with the Borgo Marinari, the Castel dell'Ovo, and via Chiatamone, all features of the Partenope promenade. It extends to the offices of the newspaper Il Mattino, the so-called "Pallonetto di Santa Lucia" and the slopes of Mount Echia nearly to Monte di Dio. The area is bounded on the north and east by the Royal Palace, the Molosiglio and via Cesario Console, anciently famous as "Rua dei Provenzali".

== History ==
Santa Lucia has been identified with the history of Naples ever since the Greeks from Cumae landed here to found the small market harbour of Falero, which later gave rise — between the beach, the islet of Megaride and the Pizzofalcone hill — to the polis Parthenope (from the siren who tried to enchant Ulysses); later that town would be known as Palepoli (“old city”).

In the preimperial Roman age, general Lucullus moved to the area and built his magnificent villa, known as Oppidum Lucullianum, to which the last Roman emperor Romulus Augustus exiled to live out his days. In the imperial age the area became famous for its proximity to the platamoniae caves, where magic rituals were held and in which Petronius set parts of his Satyricon.

In the 7th century Saint Patricia from Constantinople, directed towards the Holy Land, was shipwrecked here and, according to legend, he founded a sanctuary and decided to settle in Naples. In the Middle Ages, the area decayed and the villa was converted into a monastery by Basilian monks. During the period of the ducal age, they also managed the sanctuary. In the Norman age the monastery was transformed completely to become one of the best equipped fortresses guarding the gulf. In the Angevin age the close harbor was given in concession to the people of the Provençe, the land of origin of the Angevin kings; the area became very important for them, militarily and commercially, and was known by the toponym of "Port of the Provenzali".

In 1588, the sanctuary was given in management to an order of nuns and, as result, was entirely rebuilt for wish of abbess Eusebia Minadoa. The Spanish viceroys, between 1500 and 1700, held the area in particular high regard and embellished it greatly; this included structures by the architect Domenico Fontana beginning in 1599 that essentially transformed a village of fishermen and traders into one of the most prestigious areas of the city. With the arrival of the Bourbon dynasty, the lucìani (as the inhabitants of Santa Lucia are called) became intimates of the kings, serving as craftsmen and suppliers of the royal house. The area was a favourite goal of that brand of elite tourism associated with the so-called grand tour. During that period the area hosted a famous casino that saw the presence of various celebrities such as Giacomo Casanova and Alexandre Dumas. The establishment was especially valued by the queen of Naples, Maria Carolina. A single wing of the building survives today as part of a university conference center.

== 19th century and later ==
Already in 1845, the sea level rose considerably, making it necessary to bury the original sanctuary and build a new one on top of it; after the annexion of the Kingdom of Naples to Italy (1861) Santa Lucia underwent a complete transformation, including the enlarging and straightening of the Partenope promenade. It involved reclaiming large tracts of land from the sea and the creation of new streets, all of which has served the area well in this age of modern tourism. The new sections now host a row of modern hotels and a number of sailing clubs. The offices of the Campania regional government are located in Palazzo Santa Lucia, and the area is the site of the conference center of the University “Federico II " and of the Cervantes Institute of Spanish language and culture.

The area was home to admiral Francesco Caracciolo, who served in the neapolitan navy and then was executed through hanging by admiral Nelson for his service to the Parthenopaean Republic. His body, thrown into the sea, was recovered and is now interred in another famous church in the area, that of Santa Maria della Catena, where an epitaph, placed in 1881, recalls the episode.

The Ports of Santa Lucia were used during the 1960 Summer Olympics, the Olympic harbors of the Dragon sailboats (quays of Borgo Marinari), Star and 5.5 Metre (quays of Molosiglio) were used. Although the Finn and Flying Dutchman sailboats were instead housed in Mergellina. HRH Crown Prince Constantine won the Gold medal in the event of Dragon sailboats.

== In popular culture ==
Santa Lucia has been like subject of some traditional Neapolitan songs, among which is the most famous, "Santa Lucia", and "Santa Lucia luntana", a musical symbol of Neapolitans leaving home to emigrate to America.
