= Pavel Pankrashkin =

Soviet sailor (born 1923)

Personal information
- Nationality: Soviet
- Born: 1923

Sport
- Sport: Sailing

Pavel Pankrashkin (born 1923) was a Soviet sailor. He competed in the 5.5 Metre event at the 1952 Summer Olympics.
