= William Berntsen =

Danish sailor (1912–1994)

Personal information
- Full name: William Eldred Berntsen
- Nationality: Danish
- Born: 25 March 1912 Jersie, Denmark
- Died: 14 September 1994 (aged 82) Frederikssund, Denmark
- Height: 170 cm (5 ft 7 in)
- Weight: 70 kg (154 lb)

Sailing career
- Sport: Sailing
- Club: Hellerup Sejlklub; Frederikssund Sejlklub
- Classes: Dragon; 5.5 Metre
Medal record
Sailing
Representing Denmark
Olympic Games
Bronze medal – third place	1948 London	Dragon
Silver medal – second place	1960 Rome	5.5 Metre

William Eldred Berntsen (25 March 1912 – 14 September 1994) was a Danish competitive sailor and Olympic medalist. He won a silver medal in the 5.5 Metre class at the 1960 Summer Olympics in Rome, together with Søren Hancke and Steen Christensen.
