= Hans-Hermann Magnussen =

German sailor

Personal information
- Nationality: German
- Born: 9 September 1925; Kiel, Germany
- Died: 17 July 2000 (aged 74); Kiel, Germany

Sport
- Sport: Sailing

Hans-Hermann Magnussen (9 September 1925 – 17 July 2000) was a German sailor. He competed in the 5.5 Metre event at the 1952 Summer Olympics.
