= Ernest Wagstaff =

Australian sailor

Personal information
- Nationality: Australian
- Born: 8 April 1928 Melbourne, Australia
- Died: November 2001

Sport
- Sport: Sailing

Ernest Wagstaff (8 April 1928 – November 2001) was an Australian sailor. He competed in the 5.5 Metre event at the 1960 Summer Olympics.
