= Jean Roux-Delimal =

French sailor

Personal information
- Nationality: French
- Born: 20 May 1907; Tours, France
- Died: 25 March 2005 (aged 97); Louveciennes, France

Sport
- Sport: Sailing

Jean Roux-Delimal (20 May 1907 – 25 March 2005) was a French sailor. He competed in the 5.5 Metre event at the 1952 Summer Olympics.
