= Ingemann Bylling Jensen =

Danish sailor

Personal information
- Nationality: Danish
- Born: 12 December 1925; Horsens, Denmark
- Died: 9 September 2003 (aged 77)

Sport
- Sport: Sailing

Ingemann Bylling Jensen (12 December 1925 – 9 September 2003) was a Danish sailor. He competed in the 5.5 Metre event at the 1952 Summer Olympics.
