= Hans Baars-Lindner =

German sailor

Personal information
- Full name: Hans Erich Baars-Lindner
- Nationality: German
- Born: 9 December 1925; Flensburg
- Died: 5 June 2014 (aged 88); Schleswig
- Height: 180 cm (5 ft 11 in)
- Weight: 80 kg (176 lb)

Sailing career
- Class: 5.5 Metre

Hans Erich Baars-Lindner (9 December 1925 – 5 June 2014) was a German sailor who competed in the 1960 Summer Olympics.
