= Godfrey Higgs =

Bahamian sailor

Personal information
- Nationality: Bahamian
- Born: 28 September 1907; Nassau, Bahamas
- Died: 26 May 1986 (aged 78); Nassau, Bahamas

Sport
- Sport: Sailing

Godfrey Higgs (28 September 1907 – 26 May 1986) was a Bahamian sailor. He competed in the 5.5 Metre event at the 1952 Summer Olympics.
