= Erik Stadigh =

Finnish sailor

Personal information
- Nationality: Finnish
- Born: 21 May 1928 Helsinki, Finland
- Died: 13 January 2003 (aged 74) Helsinki, Finland

Sport
- Sport: Sailing

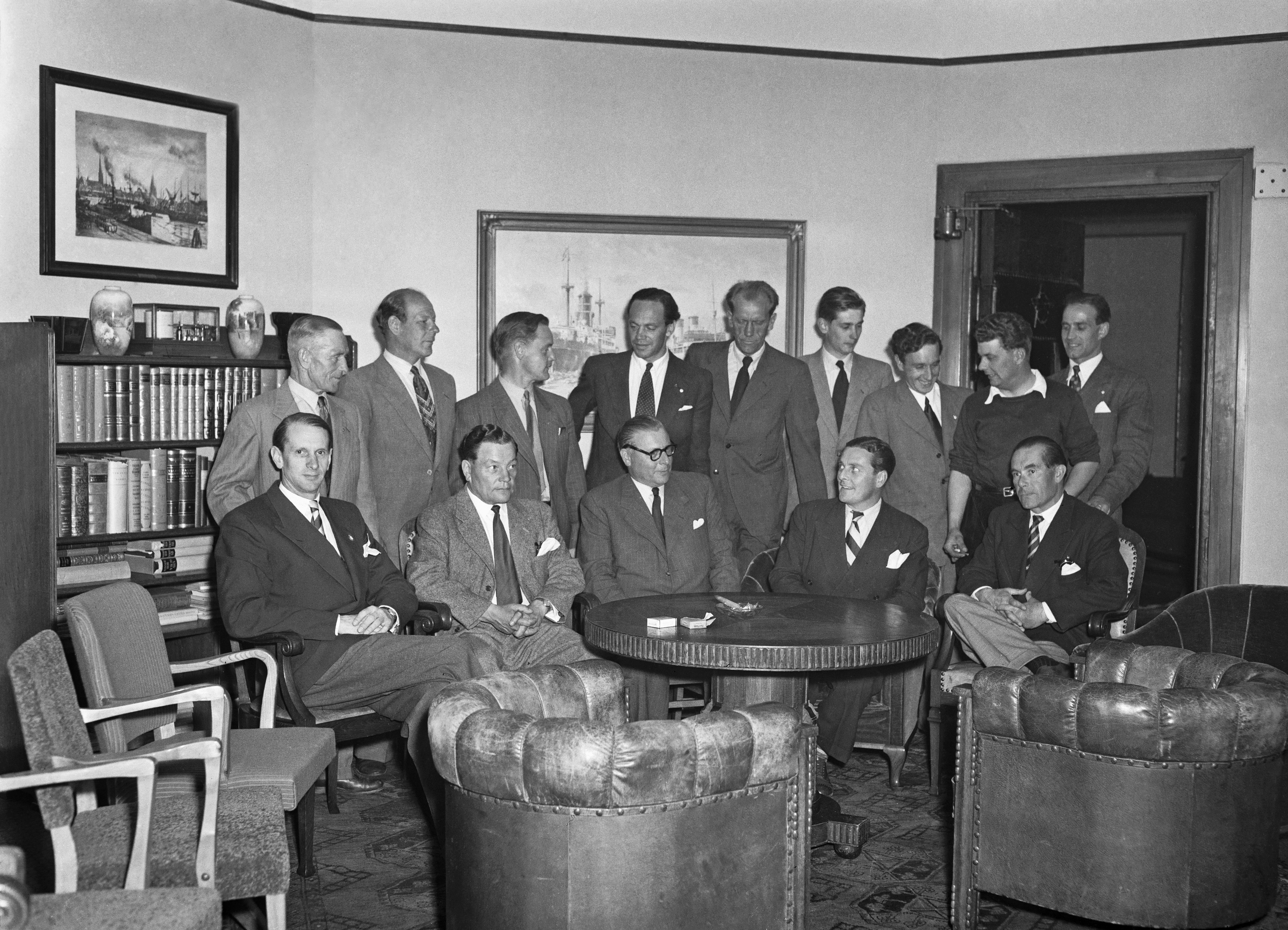
Helsinki Summer Olympics 1952. Stadigh is fourth from right, standing.

Erik Stadigh (21 May 1928 – 13 January 2003) was a Finnish sailor. He competed in the 5.5 Metre event at the 1952 Summer Olympics.
