= Pierre Buret =

French sailor

Personal information
- Nationality: French
- Born: 3 May 1923; Caen, France
- Died: 31 March 2003 (aged 79); Vence, France

Sport
- Sport: Sailing

Pierre Buret (3 May 1923 – 31 March 2003) was a French sailor. He competed in the 5.5 Metre event at the 1960 Summer Olympics.
