= Denis Hegarty =

South African sailor

Personal information
- Nationality: South African
- Born: 27 March 1912
- Died: 16 February 1998 (aged 85)

Sport
- Sport: Sailing

Denis Hegarty (27 March 1912 – 16 February 1998) was a South African sailor. He competed in the 5.5 Metre event at the 1956 Summer Olympics.
