= John Ruggles (sailor) =

British sailor (born 1934)

Personal information
- Nationality: British
- Born: 12 April 1934 (age 90); London, England

Sport
- Sport: Sailing

John K. Ruggles (born 12 April 1934) is a British sailor. He competed in the 5.5 Metre event at the 1960 Summer Olympics.
