= Jorge Martí =

Spanish sailor

Personal information
- Nationality: Spanish
- Born: 5 March 1930; Barcelona, Spain
- Died: 22 December 1998 (aged 68); Barcelona, Spain

Sport
- Sport: Sailing

Jorge Martí Llumá (5 March 1930 – 22 December 1998) was a Spanish sailor. He competed in the 5.5 Metre event at the 1960 Summer Olympics.
