= Jacques Allard =

French sailor (1925–2015)

Personal information
- Nationality: French
- Born: 8 September 1925 Arcachon, France
- Died: 15 July 2015 (aged 89) Arcachon, France

Sport
- Sport: Sailing

Jacques Allard (8 September 1925 – 15 July 2015) was a French sailor. He competed in the 5.5 Metre event at the 1952 Summer Olympics.

== Biography ==
He competed in the 5.5-meter class at the 1952 Summer Olympics aboard the Damoiselle; the French team finished in fourteenth place. He was a multiple French Dragon (keelboat) class champion and vice president of the French Sailing Federation.
