= Robert Stinson =

American sailor (1932–2021)

Robert Stinson Jr.
Personal information
- Nickname: Bobby
- Nationality: American
- Born: November 8, 1932 Baltimore, Maryland, U.S.
- Died: September 2021 (aged 88) Australia
- Education: Princeton University, Harvard University

Sport
- Sport: Sailing

Robert Stinson (November 8, 1932 – September 2021) was an American sailor. He was born in Baltimore in 1932 to Robert Stinson Sr. and Anne Elizabeth Tudor. He competed in the 5.5 Metre event at the 1956 Summer Olympics at the Port Phillip Bay venue in Australia. He graduated from Princeton University and Harvard Business School.

== Family ==
Robert, known to his friends and family as "Bobby", had two siblings, Anne Tudor Twitchell and John Stinson. He married Lou with whom he had 2 children.

Stinson died in September 2021, at the age of 88.
