= Héctor Calegaris =

Argentine sailor

Medal record

Sailing

Representing Argentina

Olympic Games
Silver medal – second place	1960 Rome	Three Person Keelboat

Héctor Calegaris (27 June 1915 – 3 March 2008) was an Argentine sailor. He won the Silver Medal in the Three Person Keelboat event in the 1960 Summer Olympics in Rome along with Jorge del Río Sálas and Jorge Salas Chávez
