= Børre Falkum-Hansen =

Norwegian sailor

Personal information
- Born: 13 August 1919 Kristiania, Norway
- Died: 24 June 2006 (aged 86)

Sport
- Sport: Sailing
Medal record
Sailing
Representing Norway
Olympic Games
Silver medal – second place	1952 Helsinki	5.5 metre class

Børre Erik Falkum-Hansen (13 August 1919 – 24 June 2006) was a Norwegian sailor and Olympic medalist. He was born and died in Oslo.

He received a silver medal in the 5.5 metre class with the boat Encore at the 1952 Summer Olympics in Helsinki, together with Peder Lunde and Peder's wife "Babben".
