= Basil McKinney =

Bahamian sailor

Personal information
- Nationality: Bahamian
- Born: 21 June 1912; Nassau, Bahamas
- Died: 1969 (aged 56–57); Nassau, Bahamas

Sport
- Sport: Sailing

Basil McKinney (21 June 1912 – 1969) was a Bahamian sailor. He competed in the 5.5 Metre event at the 1952 Summer Olympics.
