= Fredrik Eklöf =

Finnish sailor

Personal information
- Nationality: Finnish
- Born: 23 March 1937 (age 88); Helsinki, Finland

Sport
- Sport: Sailing

Fredrik Eklöf (born 23 March 1937) is a Finnish sailor. He competed in the 5.5 Metre event at the 1960 Summer Olympics.
