= Aarne Castrén =

Finnish sailor

Personal information
- Full name: Aarne Frithiof Louis Castrén
- Nationality: Finnish
- Born: 2 September 1923; Helsinki, Finland
- Died: 2 January 1997 (aged 73); Helsinki, Finland

Sport
- Sport: Sailing

Aarne Frithiof Louis Castrén (2 September 1923 – 2 January 1997) was a Finnish sailor. He competed in the 5.5 Metre event at the 1952 Summer Olympics.
