= Pierre Girard (sailor) =

Swiss sailor (1926–2022)

Personal information
- Nationality: Swiss
- Born: 2 August 1926 Geneva, Switzerland
- Died: 12 February 2022 (aged 95) Geneva, Switzerland

Sport
- Sport: Sailing
Medal record
Representing Switzerland
Men's sailing
Olympic Games
Bronze medal – third place	1960 Rome	5.5 Metre

Pierre Girard (2 August 1926 – 12 February 2022) was a Swiss competitive sailor and Olympic medalist. He won a bronze medal in the 5.5 Metre class at the 1960 Summer Olympics in Rome, together with Henri Copponex and Manfred Metzger. Girard died in Geneva on 12 February 2022, at the age of 95.
