= Louis Chauvot =

French sailor

Personal information
- Nationality: French
- Born: 14 February 1913 Montceau-les-Mines, France
- Height: 175 cm (5 ft 9 in)
- Weight: 75 kg (165 lb; 11 st 11 lb)

Sport
- Sport: Sailing

Louis Chauvot (born 14 February 1913, date of death unknown) was a French sailor. He competed in the 5.5 Metre event at the 1960 Summer Olympics in Rome, Italy.
