= Joe Ellis-Brown =

South African sailor (1916–1967)

Personal information
- Nationality: South African
- Born: 15 June 1916; Durban, South Africa
- Died: 21 November 1967 (aged 51); Durban, South Africa

Sport
- Sport: Sailing

Joe Ellis-Brown (15 June 1916 – 21 November 1967) was a South African sailor. He competed in the 5.5 Metre event at the 1952 Summer Olympics.
