= Eusebio Bertrand =

Spanish sailor

Personal information
- Nationality: Spanish
- Born: 6 January 1930; Barcelona, Spain
- Died: 16 October 2011 (aged 81); Barcelona, Spain

Sport
- Sport: Sailing

Eusebio Bertrand (6 January 1930 – 16 October 2011) was a Spanish sailor. He competed in the 5.5 Metre event at the 1960 Summer Olympics.
