= Vibeke Lunde =

Norwegian sailor

Personal information
- Born: 21 March 1921 Kristiania, Norway
- Died: 12 August 1962 (aged 41)
- Spouse: Peder Lunde Sr.

Sport
- Sport: Sailing
Medal record
Sailing
Representing Norway
Olympic Games
Silver medal – second place	1952 Helsinki	5.5 metre class

Vibeke "Babben" Lunde (21 March 1921 – 12 August 1962) was a Norwegian sailor and Olympic medalist.

== Personal life ==
Lunde was born in Oslo on 21 March 1921, and was the sister of Else Christophersen and Tor Arneberg. She was married to Peder Lunde Sr., and a daughter-in-law of Eugen Lunde.

She was the mother of Peder Lunde Jr., mother-in-law of Aud Hvammen, and grandmother of Jeanette Lunde.

== Career ==
Lunde won a silver medal in the 5.5 metre class with the boat Encore at the 1952 Summer Olympics in Helsinki, together with her husband Peder Lunde and Børre Falkum-Hansen.

Lunde died in Oslo on 12 August 1962.
