= Bert Darrell =

Bermudian sailor

Personal information
- Nationality: Bermudian
- Born: 6 January 1930; Mount Pleasant, Bermuda
- Died: 16 October 2011 (aged 81)

Sport
- Sport: Sailing

Bert Darrell (19 November 1905 – 9 April 1983) was a Bermudian sailor. He competed in the 5.5 Metre event at the 1960 Summer Olympics.
