= Magnus Wassén =

Swedish sailor

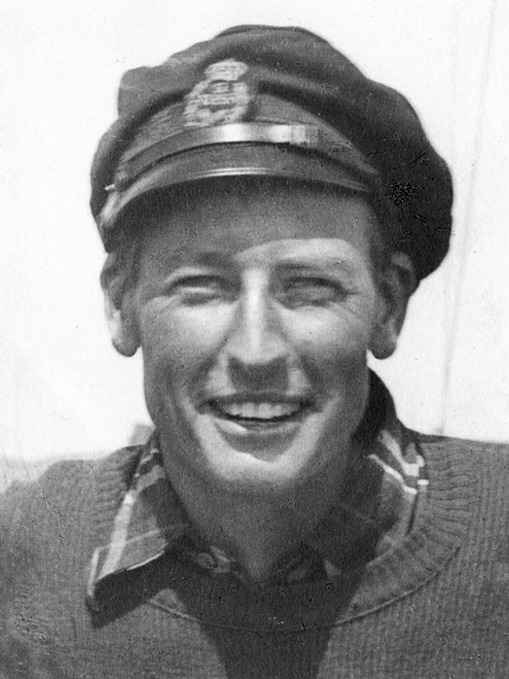
- Wassén circa 1952

Personal information
- Full name: Sten Magnus Wassén
- Born: 1 September 1920 Partille, Sweden
- Died: 23 June 2014 (aged 93) Gothenburg, Sweden

Sailing career
- Sport: Sailing
- Club: Royal Gothenburg Yacht Club
- Class: 5.5 Metre
Medal record
Sailing
Representing Sweden
Olympic Games
Bronze medal – third place	1952 Helsinki	5.5 metre class

Sten Magnus Wassén (1 September 1920 – 23 June 2014) was a Swedish sailor who competed in the 1952 Summer Olympics. Together with his elder brother Folke he won a bronze medal as crew member of the Swedish boat Hojwa in the 5.5 metre class event.
