= Poul Ohff =

Danish sailor

Personal information
- Nationality: Danish
- Born: 23 May 1920 Horsens, Denmark
- Died: 2010 (aged 89–90)

Sport
- Sport: Sailing

Poul Ohff (23 March 1920 – 2010) was a Danish sailor. He competed in the 5.5 Metre event at the 1952 Summer Olympics.
