= Manfred Metzger =

Swiss sailor

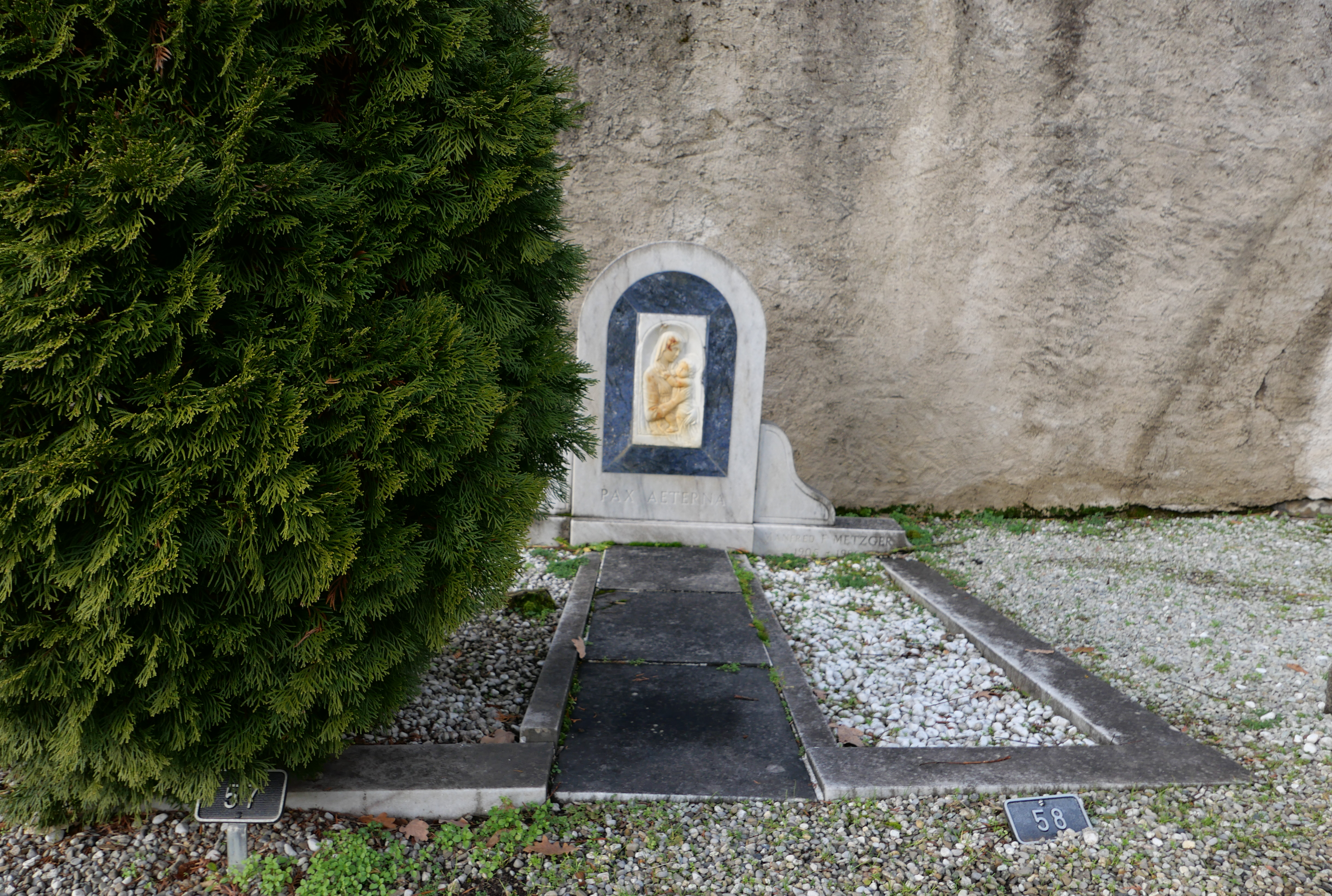

Personal information
- Nationality: Swiss
- Born: 26 May 1905 Trieste, Italy
- Died: 29 January 1986 (aged 80) Geneva, Switzerland

Sport
- Sport: Sailing
Medal record
Sailing
Representing Switzerland
Olympic Games
Bronze medal – third place	1960 Rome	5.5 Metre class

Manfred Metzger (26 May 1905 – 29 January 1986) was a Swiss competitive sailor and Olympic medalist. He won a bronze medal in the 5.5 Metre class at the 1960 Summer Olympics in Rome, together with Henri Copponex and Pierre Girard.
