= Schoettler =

Schoettler is a surname. Notable people with the surname include:

- Doris Schoettler-Boll (1945–2015), German artist
- Gail Schoettler (born 1943), American politician and businesswoman

== See also ==
- Schoettle
