= Sture Stork =

Swedish sailor (1930–2002)

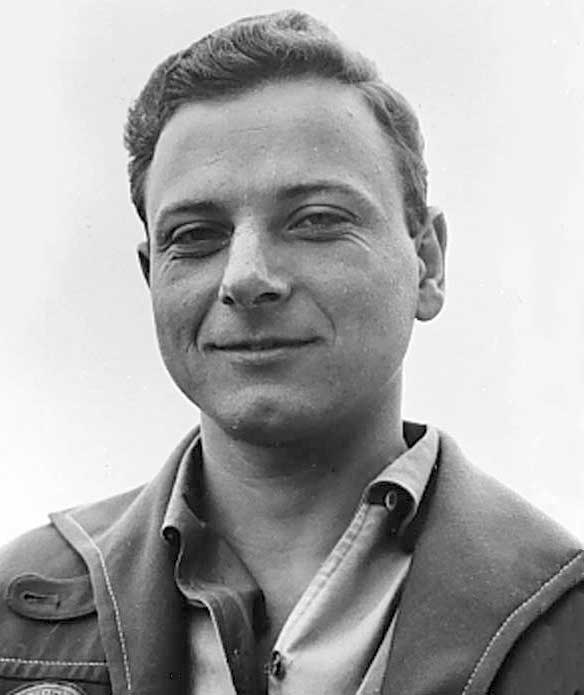

Personal information
- Full name: Sture Henrik Stork
- Born: 25 July 1930 Saltsjöbaden, Sweden
- Died: 27 March 2002 (aged 71) Trångsund, Sweden
- Height: 178 cm (5 ft 10 in)
- Weight: 79 kg (174 lb)

Sailing career
- Sport: Sailing
- Club: Royal Swedish Yacht Club
- Class: 5.5 Metre
Medal record
Sailing
Representing Sweden
Olympic Games
| Gold medal – first place | 1956 Melbourne | 5.5 metre class |
| Silver medal – second place | 1964 Tokyo | 5.5 metre class |

Sture Henrik Stork (25 July 1930 – 27 March 2002) was a Swedish sailor who competed in the 1956 and 1964 Summer Olympics.

In 1956 he won the gold medal as part of the Swedish boat Rush V in the 5.5 metre class event. Eight years later he won the silver medal as crew member of the Swedish boat Rush VII in the 5.5 metre class event.
