= Tomás Galfrascoli =

Argentine sailor

Personal information
- Born: 29 December 1925; Buenos Aires, Argentina
- Died: 30 June 2014 (aged 88)

Sport
- Sport: Sailing

Tomás Galfrascoli (29 December 1925 – 30 June 2014) was an Argentine sailor. He competed in the 5.5 Metre event at the 1952 Summer Olympics.
