= Knut Wang =

Norwegian sailor

Personal information
- Full name: Knut Astrup Wang
- Nationality: Norwegian
- Born: 4 May 1929; Oslo, Norway
- Died: 12 November 2011 (aged 82)

Sport
- Country: Norway
- Sport: Sailing

Knut Astrup Wang (4 May 1929 – 12 November 2011) was a Norwegian sailor. He was born in Oslo. He competed at the 1960 Summer Olympics in Rome, where placed seventh in the 5.5 Metre class, together with Finn Ferner and Odd Harsheim.
