= Peik Gästrin =

Finnish sailor (1934–2024)

Personal information
- Nationality: Finnish
- Born: 6 July 1934; Helsinki, Finland
- Died: 19 July 2024 (aged 90); Helsinki, Finland

Sport
- Sport: Sailing

Peik Lars Erik Gästrin (6 July 1934 – 19 July 2024) was a Finnish sailor. He competed in the 5.5 Metre event at the 1960 Summer Olympics. Gästrin died on 19 July 2024, at the age of 90.
