= Francesco Caracciolo (naval officer) =

Italian naval officer and revolutionary (1752–1799)

His Highness Prince Francesco Caracciolo
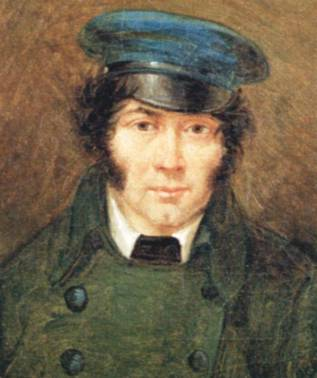
- Portrait of Francesco Caracciolo
- Born: 18 January 1752; Naples, Kingdom of Naples
- Died: 30 June 1799 (aged 47); Naples, Kingdom of Naples
- Military career
- Allegiance: Kingdom of Naples
- Branch: Real Marina
- Rank: Admiral
- Conflicts: American Revolutionary War; French Revolutionary Wars

Prince Francesco Caracciolo (18 January 1752 – 30 June 1799) was an Italian naval officer and revolutionary.

== Early life and British service ==
Caracciolo was born in Naples into an aristocratic family. It is likely that he was named after Francis Caracciolo, a saint of the Catholic Church and Francesco's ancestor. He joined the British Royal Navy and learned his seamanship under George Rodney. He fought with distinction in the Royal Navy during the American Revolutionary War, against the Barbary pirates, and against the French Navy at the Battle of Genoa under Lord Hotham. The Bourbons placed the greatest confidence in his skill.

== To Sicily and back ==
When on the approach of the French to Naples Ferdinand IV of Naples and Marie Caroline of Austria fled to Sicily on board Horatio Nelson's ship, HMS Vanguard (December 1798), Caracciolo escorted them on the frigate Sannita. He was the only prominent Neapolitan trusted by the king, but the admiral's loyalty was shaken by Ferdinand's flight. On reaching Palermo, Caracciolo asked permission to return to Naples to look after his own private affairs (January 1799). This was granted, but when he arrived at Naples, he found all the aristocracy and educated middle classes infatuated with the French revolutionary ideas, and he himself was received with great enthusiasm.

== Republican service and capture ==
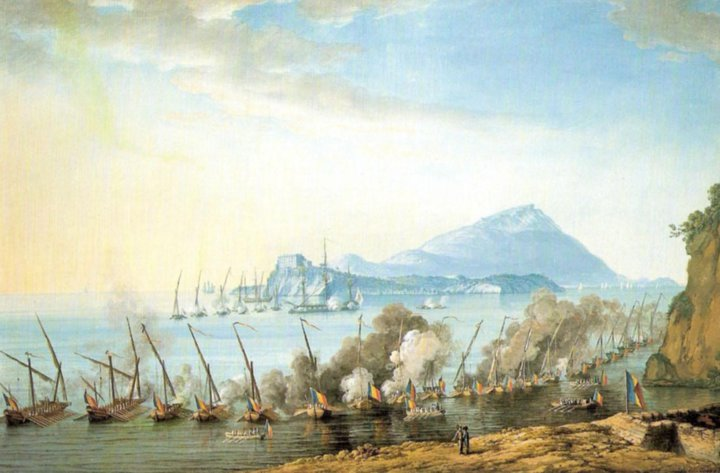
Saverio della Gatta, Battle between the ships of the Parthenopean Republic and the English off the coast of Procida, after 1799. Naples, National Museum of San Martino

He seems at first to have intended to live a retired life; but, finding that he must either join the Republican party or escape to Procida, then under British control, in which case his Neapolitan colleagues would regard him as a traitor and his property would have been confiscated, he was induced to adhere to the new order of things and took command of the republic's naval forces. Once at sea, he participated in naval operations against the British and Neapolitan navies and prevented the landing of some Royalist troops. A few days later, all the French troops in Naples, except 500 men, were recalled to the north of Italy.

Caracciolo then attacked Admiral Count Thurn, who from the Minerva commanded the Neapolitan Royalist fleet, and did some damage to that vessel. But the British fleet on the one hand and Cardinal Fabrizio Ruffo's army on the other made his situation untenable. The Republicans and the 500 French troops had retired to the castles, and Caracciolo landed and tried to escape in disguise. He was betrayed and arrested by a Royalist officer, who on 29 June brought him in chains on board Nelson's flagship, HMS Foudroyant.

Ruffo's troops overthrew the Jacobin Republic and a Royalist court-martial ordered his execution together with Annibale Giordano and Carlo Lauberg. In July 1799, king Ferdinand IV signed the decree of suppression.

== Trial and execution ==
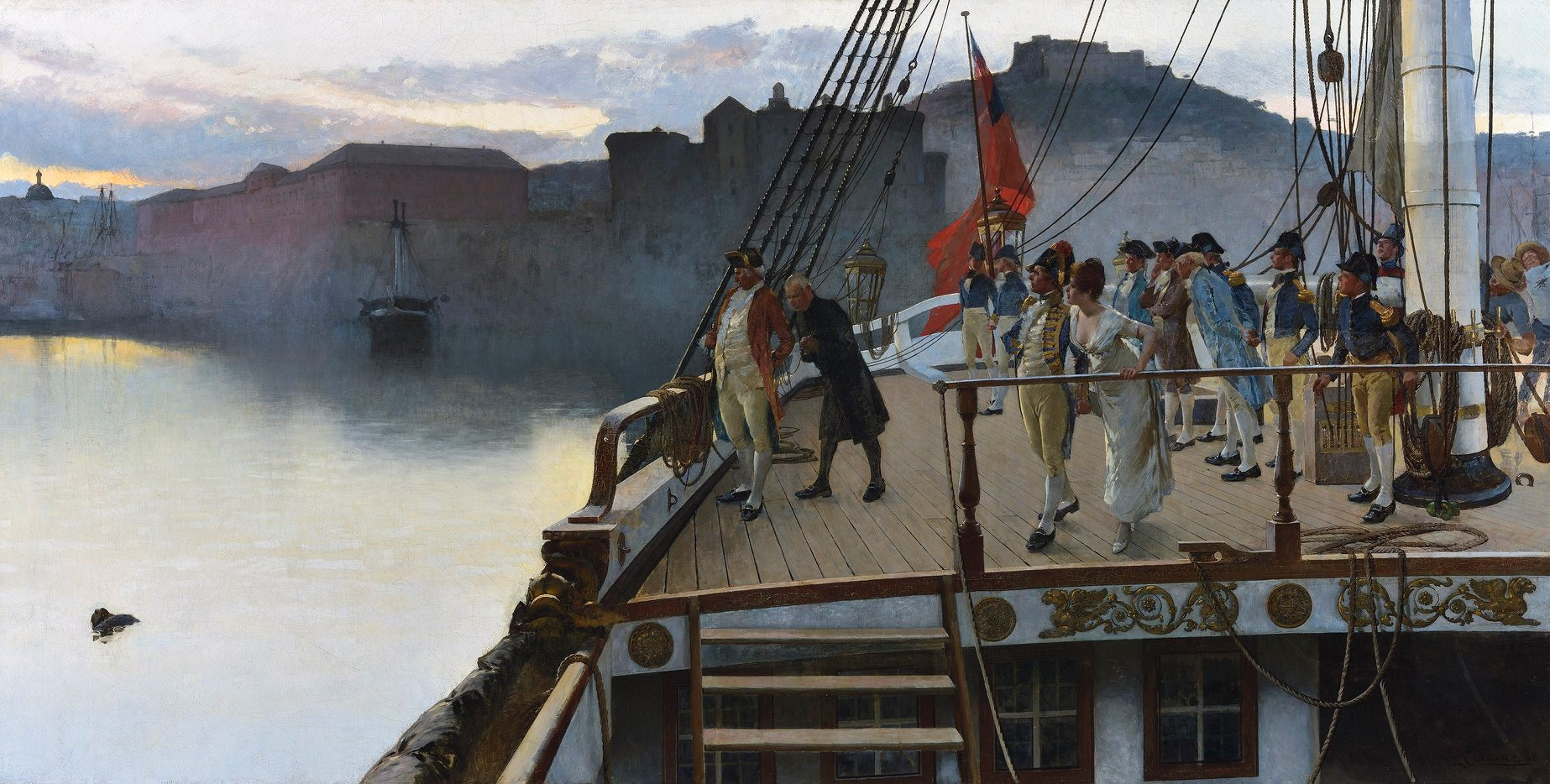
Ettore Cercone, Admiral Francesco Caracciolo demanding Christian burial, 1889. Naples, National Museum of San Martino

It is doubtful whether Caracciolo should have been included in the capitulation concluded with the Republicans in the castles, as that document promised life and liberty to those who surrendered before the blockade of the forts, whereas he was arrested afterwards, but as the whole capitulation was violated, the point is immaterial. Moreover, the admiral's fate was decided even before his capture; this is known because on 27 June, the British minister, Sir William Hamilton, had communicated to Nelson Mary Caroline's wish that Caracciolo should be hanged. As soon as he was brought on board, Nelson ordered Thurn to summon a court martial composed of Caracciolo's former officers, Thurn himself being a personal enemy of the accused. The court was held on board the Foudroyant, which was British territory.

Caracciolo was charged with high treason; he had asked to be judged by British officers, which was refused, nor was he allowed to summon witnesses in his defence. He was condemned to death by three votes to two, and as soon as the sentence was communicated to Nelson, the latter ordered that he should be hanged at the yard-arm of the Minerva the next morning, and his body thrown into the sea at sundown. Even the customary twenty-four hours respite for confession was denied him, and his request to be shot instead of hanged refused. The sentence was duly carried out on 30 June 1799.

The local port of Borgo Santa Lucia nevertheless took care of Caracciolo's remains, giving him a proper funeral and burial at church of Santa Maria della Catena. His epitaph reads, Francesco Caracciolo, Admiral of the Republic of Naples, who fell victim of the hatred and the lack of mercy of his enemies. He was hanged at the mast on 29 June 1799. The people of Santa Lucia took it upon themselves to honour him with a Christian burial. The City Council of Naples, 1881.
