= Don Pritchard =

Bahamian sailor

Personal information
- Nationality: Bahamian
- Born: 22 December 1922; Nassau, Bahamas
- Died: 1976 (aged 53–54)

Sport
- Sport: Sailing

Don Pritchard (22 December 1922 – 1976) was a Bahamian sailor. He competed in the 5.5 Metre event at the 1952 Summer Olympics.
