= Ludovico Kempter =

Argentine sailor

Personal information
- Born: 11 November 1913; Buenos Aires, Argentina
- Died: 27 August 2001 (aged 87)

Sport
- Sport: Sailing

Ludovico Kempter (11 November 1913 – 27 August 2001) was an Argentine sailor. He competed in the 5.5 Metre event at the 1952 Summer Olympics.
