= Henning Christensen =

Danish sailor

Henning Roger Christensen
Personal information
- Nationality: Danish
- Born: 9 May 1918; Vejen, Denmark
- Died: 16 November 1973 (aged 55)

Sport
- Sport: Sailing

Henning Christensen (9 May 1918 – 16 November 1973) was a Danish sailor. He competed in the 5.5 Metre event at the 1952 Summer Olympics.
