= John Bryant (sailor) =

American sailor (1930–2023)

Personal information
- Born: August 19, 1930 Philadelphia, Pennsylvania, U.S.
- Died: November 30, 2023 (aged 93)

Sport
- Sport: Sailing

John Bryant (August 19, 1930 – November 30, 2023) was an American sailor. He competed in the 5.5 Metre event at the 1956 Summer Olympics. Bryant died on November 30, 2023, at the age of 93.
