= Markus Schurch =

Swiss sailor

Personal information
- Nationality: Swiss
- Born: 7 June 1908
- Died: 30 July 1990 (aged 82)

Sport
- Sport: Sailing

Markus Schurch (7 June 1908 – 30 July 1990) was a Swiss sailor. He competed in the 5.5 Metre event at the 1952 Summer Olympics.
