= Viktor Gorlov =

Soviet sailor

Personal information
- Nationality: Soviet
- Born: 1 February 1918; Saint Petersburg, Russia
- Died: 3 December 1982 (aged 64)

Sport
- Sport: Sailing

Viktor Gorlov (1 February 1918 – 3 December 1982) was a Soviet sailor. He competed in the 5.5 Metre event at the 1960 Summer Olympics.
