= Halfdan Ditlev-Simonsen Jr. =

Norwegian sailor

Personal information
- Nationality: Norwegian
- Born: 8 February 1924; Oslo, Norway
- Died: 19 December 1989 (aged 65); Oslo, Norway

Sport
- Sport: Sailing

Halfdan Ditlev-Simonsen Jr. (8 February 1924 – 19 December 1989) was a Norwegian sailor. He competed in the 5.5 Metre event at the 1956 Summer Olympics.
