= Jerome Conway =

Canadian sailor

Jerome Conway (born 22 April 1937) is a Canadian former sailor who competed in the 5.5 Metre class at the 1960 Summer Olympics. Conway also won a silver medal in the 1959 Pan American Games in Chicago.

Conway was born in Toronto, Ontario. He received his education at St. Andrew's College (Aurora, Ontario), the University of Toronto (B.A., M.A., Psychology), and Indiana University, Bloomington Indiana (PhD, Mass Communications).

Conway's family members helped to establish a Jewish Yacht Club in Toronto (Island Yacht Club) in the early 1950's and he was active on its Board in creating Junior Sailing and Racing Programs.

Conway met his future wife (Brenda Conway, nee Freeman) at the Island Yacht Club and she and their daughters (Jillian and Lesley) became his regular crew in club racing.
