= Noël Calone =

French sailor

Personal information
- Nationality: French
- Born: 12 November 1904; La Seyne-sur-Mer, France
- Died: 21 October 1978 (aged 73); Marseille, France

Sport
- Sport: Sailing

Noël Calone (12 November 1904 – 21 October 1978) was a French sailor. He competed in the 5.5 Metre event at the 1952 Summer Olympics.
