= Juan Antonio Ragué =

Spanish sailor

Personal information
- Nationality: Spanish
- Born: 27 July 1928; Barcelona, Spain
- Died: 12 May 2007 (aged 78)

Sport
- Sport: Sailing

Juan Antonio Ragué (27 July 1928 – 12 May 2007) was a Spanish sailor. He competed in the 5.5 Metre event at the 1960 Summer Olympics.
