= Flip Keegstra =

Dutch sailor (1914–1991)

Personal information
- Full name: Philippus Harco Keegstra
- Nationality: Dutch
- Born: 14 June 1914 Amsterdam, Netherlands
- Died: 9 May 1991 (aged 76) Amsterdam, Netherlands

Sport

Sailing career
- Class(es): Swallow; 5.5 Metre
- Updated on 2014-01-04

Philippus Harco "Flip" Keegstra (20 June 1914 – 9 May 1991) was a Dutch sailor who represented his native country as at the 1948 Summer Olympics in Torbay. Keegstra, as crew member on the Dutch Swallow St. Margrite, took the 11th place with helmsman Wim de Vries Lentsch. In 1952 Keegstra returns to the Olympics, Helsinki, in the 5.5 Metre De Ruyter. With Helmsman Wim de Vries Lentsch and fellow crew member Piet Jan van der Giessen they took the 13th place.

== Sources ==
- "Flip Keegstra Bio, Stats, and Results". Olympic Sports. Sports-Reference.com. Archived from the original on 2014-01-04.
- "DE KEUZEWEDSTRIJDEN VOOR DE OLYMPISCHE SPELEN" (Evening ed.). Nieuwsblad van Friesland : Hepkema's courant. 1946-06-25.
- "Bronzen medailles voor Bob Maas en Koos de Jong" (in Dutch) (Dag ed.). Het vrĳe volk : democratisch-socialistisch dagblad. 1948-08-13.
- "The Official Report of the Organising Committee for the XIV Olympiad London 1948" (PDF). 1951. Archived from the original (PDF) on 2011-07-16.
- "OLYMPISCHE ZEILPLOEG" (Morning ed.). De vrije pers : ochtendbulletin. 1952-06-20.
- "The Officiel Report of the Organizing Committee for the games of the XV Olympiad Helsinki 1952" (PDF). 1955. Archived from the original (pdf) on 2008-04-11.
