= Karl-August Stolze =

German sailor

Karl-August Stolze (born 28 August 1920) is a German former sailor who competed in the 1960 Summer Olympics and in the 1968 Summer Olympics.
