= George O'Day =

American sailor

Personal information
- Full name: George Dyer O'Day
- Born: May 19, 1923 Brookline, Massachusetts, U.S.
- Died: July 26, 1987 (aged 64) Dover, Massachusetts, U.S.

Sailing career
- Sport: Sailing
Medal record
Sailing
Representing the United States
Olympic Games
Gold medal – first place	1960 Rome	5.5 metre class

George Dyer O'Day (May 19, 1923 – July 26, 1987) was an American sailor, Olympic champion and world champion, and boat designer. He was born in Brookline, Massachusetts, and died in Dover, Massachusetts. He graduated from Harvard University in 1945.

== Sailor ==
O'Day received a gold medal in the 5.5 Metre class at the 1960 Summer Olympics in Rome. He won the world champion title twelve times in various classes. He was Assistant Helmsman on two successful defenses of the Americas Cup, Weatherly in 1962 and Intrepid in 1967. He was the first to ever to win an Olympic Gold Medal and the America's Cup. He was elected to the National Sailing Hall of Fame in 2014.

== Boat designer ==
In 1958 O'Day founded the company O'Day Corp. The same year, together with the English boat designer Uffa Fox, O'Day co-designed the Day Sailer. The boat was inducted into the American Sailboat Hall of Fame in 2003. O'Day was inducted into the National Sailing Hall of Fame in 2014.
