= Dominique Perroud =

French sailor

Personal information
- Nationality: French
- Born: 1935 (age 90–91)

Sport
- Sport: Sailing

Dominique Perroud (born 1935) is a French sailor. He competed in the 5.5 Metre event at the 1956 Summer Olympics (dead 1969).
