= Capecchi =

Capecchi is an Italian surname. Notable people with the surname include:

- Eros Capecchi (born 1986), Italian cyclist
- Luca Capecchi (born 1974), Italian footballer
- Mario Capecchi (born 1937), Italian-born American geneticist
- Renato Capecchi (1923–1998), Italian opera singer, actor and opera director
- Trung Le Capecchi-Nguyen (born 1990), also known as Trung Le Nguyen or Trungles, Vietnamese-American cartoonist
