= Søren Hancke =

Danish sailor (born 1939)

Personal information
- Nationality: Danish
- Born: 13 December 1939 (age 86) Århus
- Height: 191 cm (6 ft 3 in)
- Weight: 76 kg (168 lb)

Sailing career
- Sport: Sailing
- Class: 5.5 Metre
Medal record
Sailing
Representing Denmark
Olympic Games
Silver medal – second place	1960 Rome	5.5 Metre

Søren Hancke (born 13 December 1939) is a Danish competitive sailor and Olympic medalist. He won a silver medal in the 5.5 Metre class at the 1960 Summer Olympics in Rome, together with William Berntsen and Steen Christensen.
