= David Bingham (sailor) =

Australian sailor

Personal information
- Nationality: Australian
- Born: 26 May 1939 (age 85); Melbourne, Australia

Sport
- Sport: Sailing

David Bingham (born 26 May 1939) is an Australian sailor. He competed in the 5.5 Metre event at the 1960 Summer Olympics.
