= Rodolfo Vollenweider =

Argentine sailor (1917–2009)

Personal information
- Born: 5 February 1917 Buenos Aires, Argentina
- Died: 27 December 2009 (aged 92) Buenos Aires, Argentina

Sport
- Sport: Sailing

Rodolfo Vollenweider (5 February 1917 – 27 December 2009) was an Argentine sailor. He competed in the 5.5 Metre event at the 1952 Summer Olympics.
