= 5.5 Metre =

International racing sailing class

International 5.5 Metre

Development
- Designer: Charles E. Nicholson (rule designer)
- Year: 1949 (rule design)
- Design: Development class
- Name: International 5.5 Metre

Boat
- Crew: 3
- Draft: Maximum: 1.35 m (4 ft 5 in)

Hull
- Type: Monohull
- Hull weight: Minimum: 1,700 kg (3,700 lb); Maximum: 2,000 kg (4,400 lb)
- LOA: About: 9.5 m (31 ft)
- Beam: Minimum: 1.92 m (6 ft 4 in)

Hull appendages
- Keel: Fixed

Sails
- Spinnaker area: About: 50.0 m^{2} (538 sq ft)
- Upwind sail area: Minimum: 26.5 m^{2} (285 sq ft); Maximum: 29.0 m^{2} (312 sq ft)

The International 5.5 Metre class was created to yield a racing keel boat that would give a sailing experience similar to that of the International 6 Metre Class but at a lower cost.

The main class regulation restricts a single quantity output from a formula involving the boat's rating length L, weight (expressed as a displacement D) and sail area S; the regulation states that the output of this formula must not exceed 5.500 metres. There is considerable scope for variations in design while still meeting this restriction, and as a result, each 5.5 metre boat is unique.

If the design parameters of a proposed new boat result in a formula output exceeding 5.5 metres, then one or more of the parameters must be suitably adjusted. Performance data gained from testing models towed in a long water tank (referred to in yacht design as a Ship model basin) can suggest optimal combinations of parameters. The 5.5. metre rule is a variant of the International Rule (sailing) established in 1907. The 5.5. is therefore closely related to larger metre boats such as the 6mR, 8mR and the 12mR.

Since 2010, the 5.5 Metre is one of the Vintage Yachting Classes at the Vintage Yachting Games.

== History ==
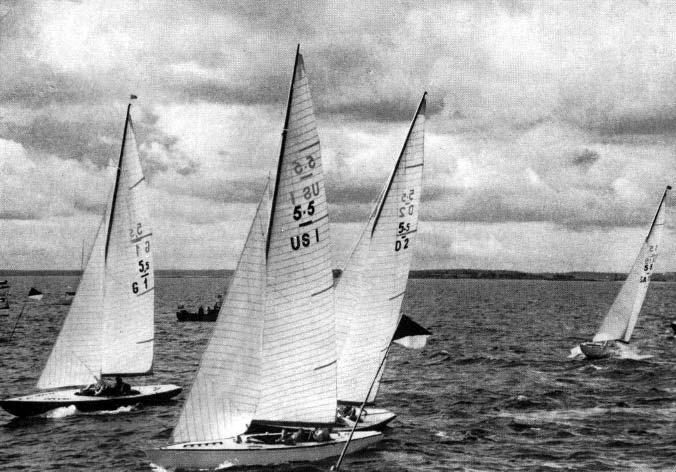
5.5-metre class Olympic race in Helsinki 1952. Boats are German Tom Kyle (G I), Gold medalist Complex II (US I) and Danish Jill (D 2).

The 5.5-metre class was a redesign of the 6-metre class by Charles E. Nicholson in 1937. The first boats conforming to the 5.5-metre rule were built in 1949. There had been an earlier attempt to build a cheaper alternative to the Sixes. In 1929, the 5-metre class was established by the French "Union de Societes Nautique Francaise" and was accepted in London. It achieved a position as the smallest new international metre class, and some hundred boats were built. Nevertheless, the 5 metre never managed to achieve an Olympic status. The 5.5-metre class replaced it quickly and was raced in the 1952 Summer Olympics in Helsinki for the first time. The Scandinavian Gold Cup has competed with 5.5m boats since 1953. 5.5 metre boats replaced the International 6-metre at the 1956 Olympic Games in Melbourne, Australia. The 5.5 metre participation in the Olympic sailing events continued at the 1960 and the 1964 Olympic Games. During the 1960s; however, it began to draw similar criticism as the preceding six-metre class - namely, increasing costs - and the boat lost Olympic status after the 1968 Olympic Games, due to excessive design and building costs of one-off boats, marking the end of development class keel boats in Olympic regattas. However, the class remained active thereafter, and 5.5-metre boats are still very actively raced.

=== The formula ===
The measurement formula is given in the 2006 International Five Point Five Metre Rating Rules:

$$5.500 \mbox{ metres} \ge 0.9 \cdot \left( \frac{L \cdot \sqrt[2]{S}} {12 \cdot \sqrt[3]{D}} + \frac{L + \sqrt[2]{S}} {4} \right)$$

where

- $L$ = length for rating
- $S$ = measured sail area
- $D$ = displacement in cubic metres

== Events ==
=== Olympic Games ===
| Rank | Nation | Gold | Silver | Bronze | Total |
|---|---|---|---|---|---|
| 1 | Sweden | 2 | 1 | 1 | 4 |
| 2 | United States | 2 | 0 | 2 | 4 |
| 3 | Australia | 1 | 0 | 0 | 1 |
| 4 | Great Britain | 0 | 1 | 1 | 2 |
| 4 | Switzerland | 0 | 1 | 1 | 2 |
| 6 | Denmark | 0 | 1 | 0 | 1 |
| 6 | Norway | 0 | 1 | 0 | 1 |
| Totals (7 entries) | | 5 | 5 | 5 | 15 |

| Games | Gold | Silver | Bronze |
|---|---|---|---|
| 1952 Helsinki | United States; Britton Chance; Michael Schoettle; Edgar White; Sumner White | Norway; Peder Lunde; Vibeke Lunde; Børre Falkum-Hansen | Sweden; Folke Wassén; Carl-Erik Ohlson; Magnus Wassén |
| 1956 Melbourne | Sweden; Lars Thörn; Hjalmar Karlsson; Sture Stork | Great Britain; Robert Perry; David Bowker; John Dillon; Neil Kennedy-Cochran-Patrick | Australia; Jock Sturrock; Douglas Buxton; Devereaux Mytton |
| 1960 Rome | United States; George O'Day; James Hunt; David Smith | Denmark; William Berntsen; Steen Christensen; Sören Hancke | Switzerland; Henri Copponex; Pierre Girard; Manfred Metzger |
| 1964 Tokyo | Australia; William Northam; Peter O'Donnell; James Sargeant | Sweden; Lars Thörn; Arne Karlsson; Sture Stork | United States; John J. McNamara; Joseph Batchelder; Francis Scully |
| 1968 Mexico City | Sweden; Ulf Sundelin; Jörgen Sundelin; Peter Sundelin | Switzerland; Louis Noverraz; Bernhard Dunand; Marcel Stern | Great Britain; Robin Aisher; Paul Anderson; Adrian Jardine |

=== Vintage Yachting Games ===
| Rank | Nation | Gold | Silver | Bronze | Total |
|---|---|---|---|---|---|
| 1 | Finland (FIN) | 1 | 0 | 0 | 1 |
| 2 | Germany (GER) | 0 | 1 | 0 | 1 |
| 3 | France (FRA) | 0 | 0 | 1 | 1 |
| Totals (3 entries) | | 1 | 1 | 1 | 3 |

| Event | Gold | Silver | Bronze |
|---|---|---|---|
| 2012 Lake Como | Finland; Anders Nordman; Robert Segercrantz; Johan Hjelt | Germany; Hubert 'Biwi' Reich; Wolfgang Oehler; Christian Hemmerich | France); William Borel; Yves Duclos-Grenet; Adrien Baumelle |

=== Pan American Games ===
| Rank | Nation | Gold | Silver | Bronze | Total |
|---|---|---|---|---|---|
| 1 | United States (USA) | 1 | 0 | 0 | 1 |
| 2 | Canada (CAN) | 0 | 1 | 0 | 1 |
| 3 | Ecuador (ECU) | 0 | 0 | 1 | 1 |
| Totals (3 entries) | | 1 | 1 | 1 | 3 |

| Event | Gold | Silver | Bronze |
|---|---|---|---|
| 1959 Chicago | United States | Canada | Ecuador |

=== European Championships ===
| Rank | Nation | Gold | Silver | Bronze | Total |
|---|---|---|---|---|---|
| 1 | Switzerland (SUI) | 7 | 4 | 7 | 18 |
| 2 | Norway (NOR) | 2 | 2 | 0 | 4 |
| 3 | United States (USA) | 1 | 0 | 1 | 2 |
| 4 | Great Britain (GBR) | 0 | 1 | 1 | 2 |
| 5 | France (FRA) | 0 | 1 | 0 | 1 |
| 5 | Soviet Union (URS) | 0 | 1 | 0 | 1 |
| Totals (6 entries) | | 10 | 9 | 9 | 28 |

| Event | Gold | Silver | Bronze |
|---|---|---|---|
| 1968 Neuenburger See | Toucan IX (SUI); Louis Noverraz | Nadezhda VI (URS); Konstantin Alexandrov | Janael (FRA); Breteche |
| 1980 Bénodet | Switzerland (F); Sprecher | France (F); Souben | Switzerland (Z); Capecchi |
| 1993 Cannes | The Sting (SUI); Christian Wahl | Zenda Corn (NOR); Kalle Nergaard | My Shout (USA); Glen Foster |
| 1995 Thun | Switzerland; Daniel Schenker; Christoph Schenker; Eric Waser | Switzerland; Jürg Menzi; Jürg Christen; Dino Fumasoli | Switzerland; Bruno Marazzi; Stefan Haftka; Flavio Marazzi |
| 1997 Le Crouesty | United States (FRA); Glen Foster | Switzerland (SUI); Jean-Claude Vuithier | Switzerland (SUI); Jürg Menzi |
| 1998 Cannes | Switzerland (FRA); Christian Wahl | Norway (NOR); Kalle Nergaard | United States (USA); Glen Foster |
| 2000 Genoa | Joker 8 (SUI); Thomas Moser; Felix Meyer; T. Sprecher | Salamander 5 (GBR); Jonathan Janson; Mark Downer; Rupert Richardson | Marie-Françoise 14 (SUI); Jürg Menzi; Juerg Christen; Daniel Stampfli |
| 2005 Attersee | Marie-Françoise 17 (SUI); Jürg Menzi; Daniel Stampfli; Gaume | Switzerland; Christoph Burger | Switzerland; Hans-Peter Schmid |
| 2008 Mariehamn | Norway (FIN); Kristian Nergaard; Petrus Eide; Johan Barne | Norway (NOR); Christoph Burger; Christof Wilke; Mathias Dahlman; Dominik Neidhart 1st race only | Switzerland (SUI); Jürg Menzi; Daniel Stampfli; Léonard Gaume |
| 2013 Benodet | Norway (FIN); Kristian Nergaard; NN; NN | Norway (SUI); Bernard Haissly; NN; NN | Switzerland (SUI); Jürg Menzi; NN; NN |

== Class association ==
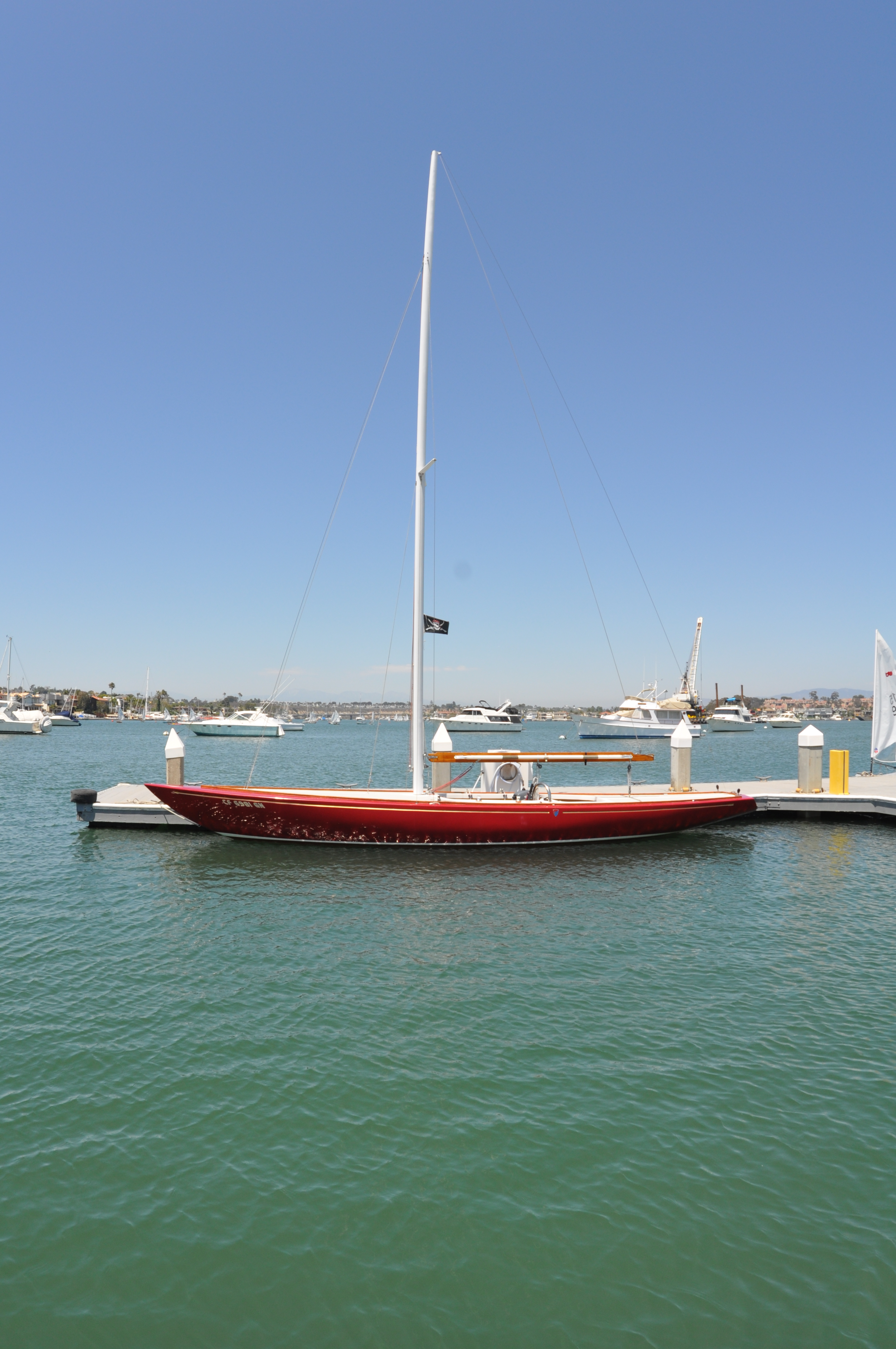
International 5.5 Metre

The object of the International 5.5 Metre Class Association is to promote and develop 5.5 Metre racing throughout the World. The first President of the association was Mr. Owen Aisher.

Since the development of the class spanned more than half a century, the early boats are not competitive in racing against the modern designs. Therefore, the association made, in 2007, divisions in the class based upon the age of the boat:

- Classic Fleet (Designs before 1970)
- Evolution Fleet
- Modern Fleet (Designs from 1994)

During major races, there are separate trophies per fleet; however, if a classic fleet boat beats the modern fleet, the classic fleet boat wins the modern fleet trophy.
