= Santa Maria della Catena, Naples =

Church building in Naples, Italy

Santa Maria della Catena
- Santa Maria delle Grazie a Catena
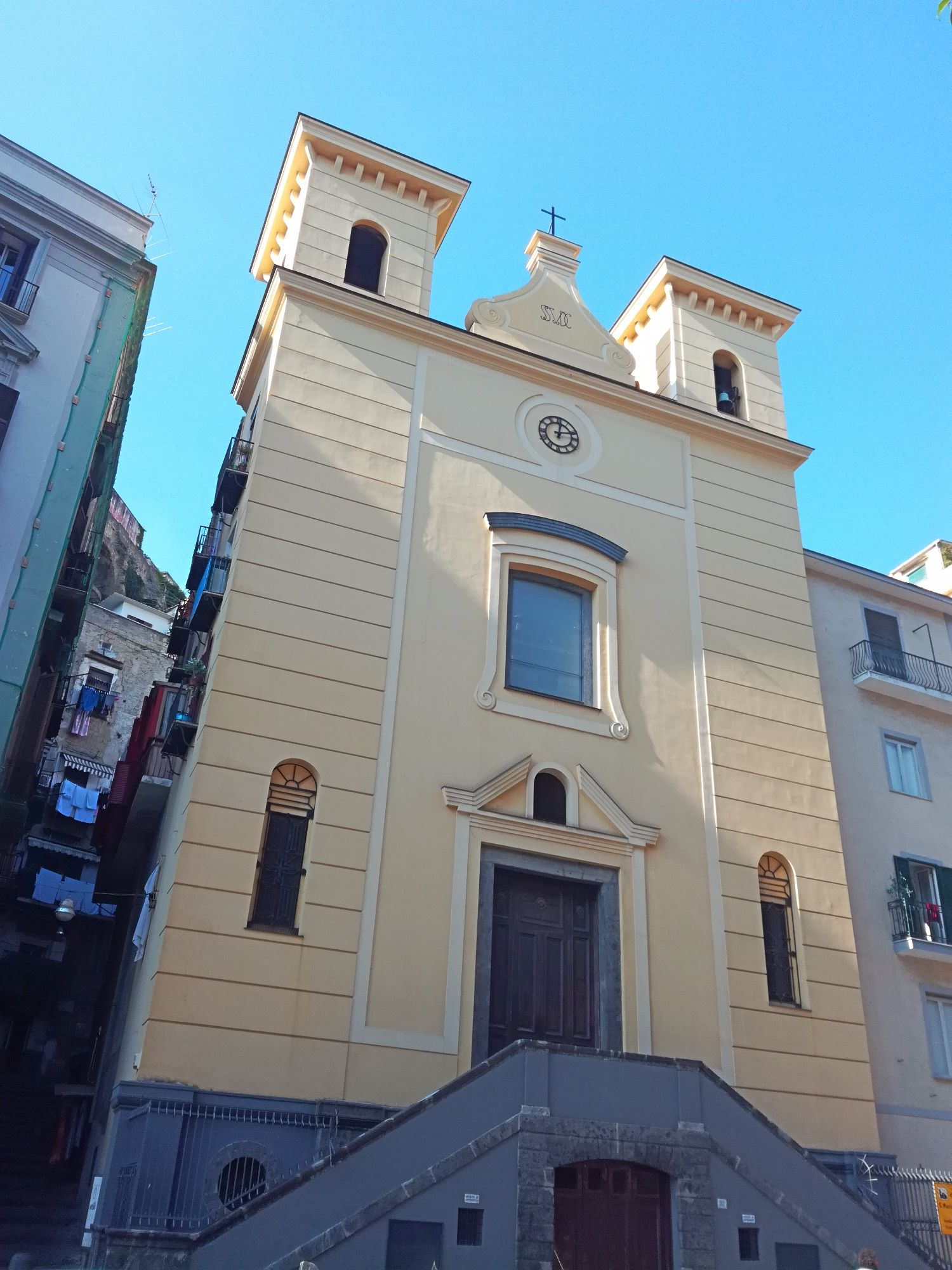

Religion
- Affiliation: Catholicism
- Region: Campania
- Rite: Roman
- Patron: Mary

Location
- Municipality: Naples
- Country: Italy
- Interactive map of Santa Maria della Catena
- Coordinates: 40.831560°N 14.248585°E

Architecture
- Style: Neoclassical
- Groundbreaking: 1576

Santa Maria della Catena or Santa Maria del Porto is a church in Borgo Santa Lucia of Naples, Italy.

The church was founded in 1576 by the inhabitants of the quartiere, and dedicated to the Madonna della Catena, an important Marian cult in Naples and Sicily. The legend holds that in 1390 in Palermo, three innocent, yet condemned, prisoners had their execution delayed due to a downpour. While in jail, their chains were broken by the miraculous intervention of the Virgin. The chains were found in the church of Santa Maria del Porto, further corroborating their tale, and led to the cult of Holy Mary of "the Chains" (della Catena).

The church here was rebuilt in the 17th century by Carmelo Passero. The decoration of the cupolas was completed by Gabriele Barrile, with collaboration of Andrea Canale. The church has the tomb of the painter Jusepe de Ribera, called Spagnoletto. In the church has been buried since 1799 Admiral Francesco Caracciolo, who was executed by order of Horatio Nelson. The fishermen of the neighborhood considered the admiral one of their own. An epitaph, posted in 1881, recalls that event.

The church was linked to the Feast of the Chain, which until thirty years ago took place in early September. During the feast, a boat was burned on the beach, around which were then organized singing and dancing. Santa Maria della Catena was a parish church up to half of the 18th century, today is a rectory for the nearby church of Santa Lucia a Mare.
