= Georges Perroud (footballer, born 1928) =

Swiss Football Player

Personal information
- Full name: Georges Perroud
- Date of birth: 20 January 1928
- Place of birth: Vaud, Switzerland
- Date of death: 18 December 2014
- Height: 1.78 m (5 ft 10 in)
- Position: Defender

Youth career
- Urania Genève Sport

Senior career*
Years	Team	Apps	(Gls)
1947–1949	Urania Genève Sport		
1949–1950	Servette FC	13	
1950–1954	Urania Genève Sport		
1954–1960	FC Lugano	70	
1960–1961	Unknown		

International career
1946-1953	Switzerland national football B team	5	
- * Club domestic league appearances and goals

Georges Perroud (January 20, 1928 – December 18, 2014) was a Swiss footballer who played as a defender.

== Biography ==
Born in Vaud, Switzerland, on January 20, 1928, Georges Perroud was a Swiss footballer renowned for his disciplined defensive style. He played for notable Swiss clubs, including Urania Genève Sport, Servette FC, and FC Lugano. Perroud was instrumental in Servette FC’s Championnat de Suisse de football win during the 1949–50 season and remains a respected figure in Swiss football history. He played for the Switzerland national football B team in several occasions.

== Club career ==
Georges Perroud began his professional football career with Urania Genève Sport in 1947. In 1949, he transferred to Servette FC Following his success with Servette, Perroud returned to Urania Genève Sport in 1950.

In 1954, Perroud joined FC Lugano, where he became a cornerstone of the team’s defense. During his six years with the club, he made 70 appearances and further cemented his reputation as a dependable and disciplined defender. In 1960, he ended his football career and became a coach for several second-division teams.

== Achievements ==
Swiss Champion: 1949–50 with Servette FC

== Legacy ==
Georges Perroud remains a notable figure in Swiss football history, particularly for his contributions to Servette FC and FC Lugano.
