= Barclay Livingstone =

Canadian yacht racer

Personal information
- Born: April 1, 1941 (age 85) Toronto, Canada

Sport
- Sport: Sailing

Barclay Livingstone (born 1 April 1941) is a Canadian former yacht racer who competed in the 1960 Summer Olympics. Livingstone was born in Toronto, Ontario, Canada.
