= Andy Schoettle =

American sailor

Personal information
- Born: August 17, 1933 Philadelphia, Pennsylvania, United States
- Died: November 24, 2010 (aged 77) Vero Beach, Florida, United States

Sport
- Sport: Sailing

Andy Schoettle (August 17, 1933 – November 24, 2010) was an American sailor. He competed in the 5.5 Metre event at the 1956 Summer Olympics. He graduated from Princeton University and Harvard Law School.
