= Folke Wassén =

Swedish sailor (1918–1969)

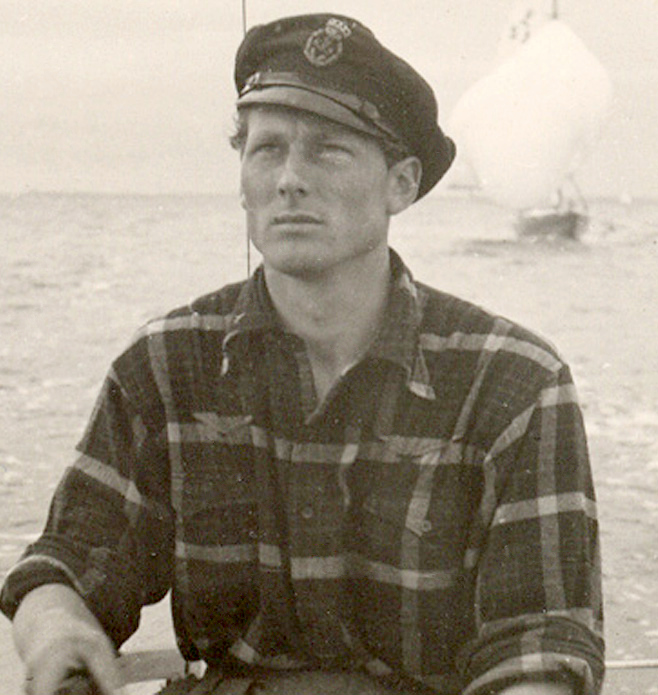

Personal information
- Full name: Folke Viktor Wassén
- Born: 18 April 1918 Gothenburg, Sweden
- Died: 22 October 1969 (aged 51) Västra Frölunda, Sweden

Sailing career
- Sport: Sailing
- Club: Royal Gothenburg Yacht Club
Medal record
Sailing
Representing Sweden
Olympic Games
Bronze medal – third place	1952 Helsinki	5.5 metre class

Folke Viktor Wassén (18 April 1918 – 22 October 1969) was a Swedish sailor who competed in the 1952 Summer Olympics. Together with his younger brother Magnus he won a bronze medal in the 5.5 metre class event.
