= Carl-Erik Ohlson =

Swedish sailor

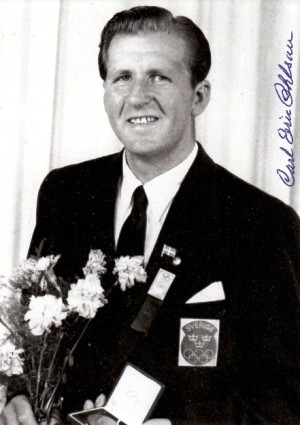

Personal information
- Born: 23 September 1920 Hälleviksstrand, Sweden
- Died: 24 December 2015 (aged 95)

Sailing career
- Sport: Sailing
- Club: Royal Gothenburg Yacht Club
Medal record
Representing Sweden
Olympic Games
Bronze medal – third place	1952 Helsinki	5.5 metre class

Carl-Erik Ohlson (23 September 1920 – 24 December 2015) was a Swedish sailor who competed in the 1952 Summer Olympics. He won a bronze medal as crew member of the Swedish boat Hojwa in the 5.5 metre class event.
