= Mel Gould =

Canadian yacht racer (1930–1974)

Personal information
- Full name: Melville Gould
- Born: July 19, 1930 Toronto, Ontario, Canada
- Died: November 14, 1974 (aged 44) Toronto, Ontario, Canada

Sport
- Sport: Sailing

Melville Earl Gould (July 19, 1930 – April 19, 1974) was a Canadian yacht racer who competed in the 1960 Summer Olympics. Gould died in Toronto on April 19, 1974, at the age of 43.
