= Steen Christensen (sailor) =

Danish sailor (born 1941)

Personal information
- Full name: Steen Bach Christensen
- Nationality: Danish
- Born: 1 November 1941 (age 84) Frederiksberg
- Height: 176 cm (5 ft 9 in)
- Weight: 65 kg (143 lb)

Sailing career
- Sport: Sailing
- Class: 5.5 Metre
Medal record
Sailing
Representing Denmark
Olympic Games
Silver medal – second place	1960 Rome	5.5 Metre

Steen Bach Christensen (born 1 November 1941) is a Danish competitive sailor and Olympic medalist. He won a silver medal in the 5.5 Metre class at the 1960 Summer Olympics in Rome, together with William Berntsen and Søren Hancke.
