= Robert Perry (sailor) =

British sailor

Medal record

Sailing

Representing Great Britain

Olympic Games
Silver medal – second place	1956 Melbourne	5.5 metre class

Robert Stanley Grosvenor Perry (4 May 1909 in Warwick – 3 April 1987 in Westminster) was a British sailor. He won a silver medal in the 5.5 metre class at the 1956 Summer Olympics.
