= Lev Alekseyev =

Russian sailor (born 1926)

Lev Borisovich Alekseyev (born 18 April 1926) is a Russian former sailor who competed in the 1952 Summer Olympics, in the 1956 Summer Olympics, and in the 1964 Summer Olympics.
