= James Hunt (sailor) =

American sailor (born 1936)

Personal information
- Full name: James Hawley Hunt
- Born: July 25, 1936 (age 90) Boston, Massachusetts, U.S.
Medal record
Men's sailing
Representing the United States
Olympic Games
Gold medal – first place	1960 Rome	5.5 metre

James Hawley Hunt (born July 25, 1936) is an American sailor and Olympic Champion. He competed at the 1960 Summer Olympics in Rome and won a gold medal in the 5.5 metre class, with the boat Minotaur, designed by his father, C. Raymond Hunt.
