= Michael Schoettle =

American sailor

Personal information
- Full name: Michael Beaver Schoettle
- Born: September 7, 1936 (age 89)

Sailing career
- Sport: Sailing
- College team: Yale University
Medal record
Men's sailing
Representing the United States
Olympic Games
Gold medal – first place	1952 Helsinki	5.5 metre

Michael Beaver Schoettle (born September 7, 1936) is an American sailor and Olympic champion. He competed at the 1952 Summer Olympics in Helsinki and earned a gold medal as crew in the 5.5 metre class on the boat Complex II.

After his Olympic and Navy Careers, Schoettle worked in sales and marketing roles at Xerox. Later, he became an executive recruiter with Heidrick & Struggles. Using his years of experience in the industry, he wrote Career Change Guide, released first in 2021.

His brother Ferdinand Schoettle competed in sailing at the 1956 Summer Olympics, where he skippered a boat which finished 4th in the 5.5 metre class. The spinnaker was accidentally dropped in the last race, hence the 4th.

His grandfather, Edwin J. Schoettle, edited and published the book "Sailing Craft".

He graduated from The Lawrenceville School Yale University and Harvard Business School, and later taught at Loyola Marymount University.
