= Jorge Alberto Salas =

Argentine sailor

Medal record

Sailing

Representing Argentina

Olympic Games
Silver medal – second place	1960 Rome	Three Person Keelboat

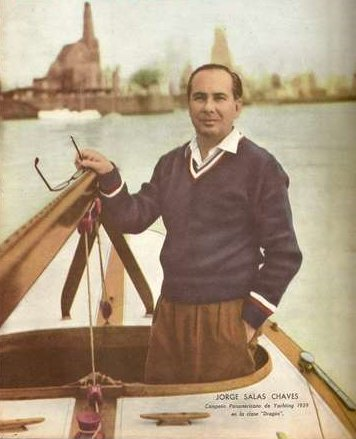
picture of Jorge Alberto Salas Chávez

Jorge Alberto Salas Chávez (17 July 1914 – 24 June 1992) was an Argentine sailor. Born in Buenos Aires, he competed at five Olympics between 1948 and 1972.

He won silver at age 46 at the 1960 Olympics in the Mixed Three Person Keelboat (Dragon class), with Héctor Calegaris and his cousin Jorge del Río Sálas. His team had come fourth in the same event four years earlier.

He is related to the Sieburger sailing clan by marriage, as his cousin Jorge del Río married Marilyn Sieburger, daughter of Enrique Sieburger, Sr. The extended Sieburger-Salas family has twenty Olympic appearances between them.

== See also ==
- List of athletes with the most appearances at Olympic Games
