= David Bowker (sailor) =

British sailor (1922–2020)

Personal information
- Born: 15 March 1922 Salford, England
- Died: 18 March 2020 (aged 98) England

Sailing career
- Sport: Sailing
Medal record
Sailing
Representing Great Britain
Olympic Games
Silver medal – second place	1956 Melbourne	5.5 metre class

David Graham Bowker (15 March 1922 – 18 March 2020) was a British sailor. He won a silver medal in the 5.5 metre class at the 1956 Summer Olympics. Born the third of five children in Salford, he was a bomber pilot in the Second World War before going on to start a yacht-building business in Bosham with his older brother Robin.
