= John Dillon (sailor) =

British sailor (1921–1988)

Medal record

Sailing

Representing Great Britain

Olympic Games
Silver medal – second place	1956 Melbourne	5.5 metre class

John Desmond Dillon (24 March 1921 in Westbourne – 17 October 1988 in Hampshire) was a British sailor. He won a silver medal in the 5.5 metre class at the 1956 Summer Olympics.
