= David Smith (sailor) =

American sailor (1925–2014)

Personal information
- Full name: David James Smith
- Nickname: Dave
- Born: October 31, 1925 Salem, Massachusetts, U.S.
- Died: March 8, 2014 (aged 88) Peabody, Massachusetts, U.S.

Sailing career
- Sport: Sailing
Medal record
Men's sailing
Representing the United States
Olympic Games
Gold medal – first place	1960 Rome	5.5-meter class

David James "Dave" Smith (October 31, 1925 – March 8, 2014) was an American sailor and Olympic champion. He competed at the 1960 Summer Olympics in Rome and won a gold medal in the 5.5-meter class with the boat Minotaur. Smith was born in Salem, Massachusetts, and died in Peabody, Massachusetts.
