= Julio Sieburger =

Argentine sailor (born 1892)

Medal record

Sailing

Representing Argentina

Olympic Games
Silver medal – second place	1948 London	6m class

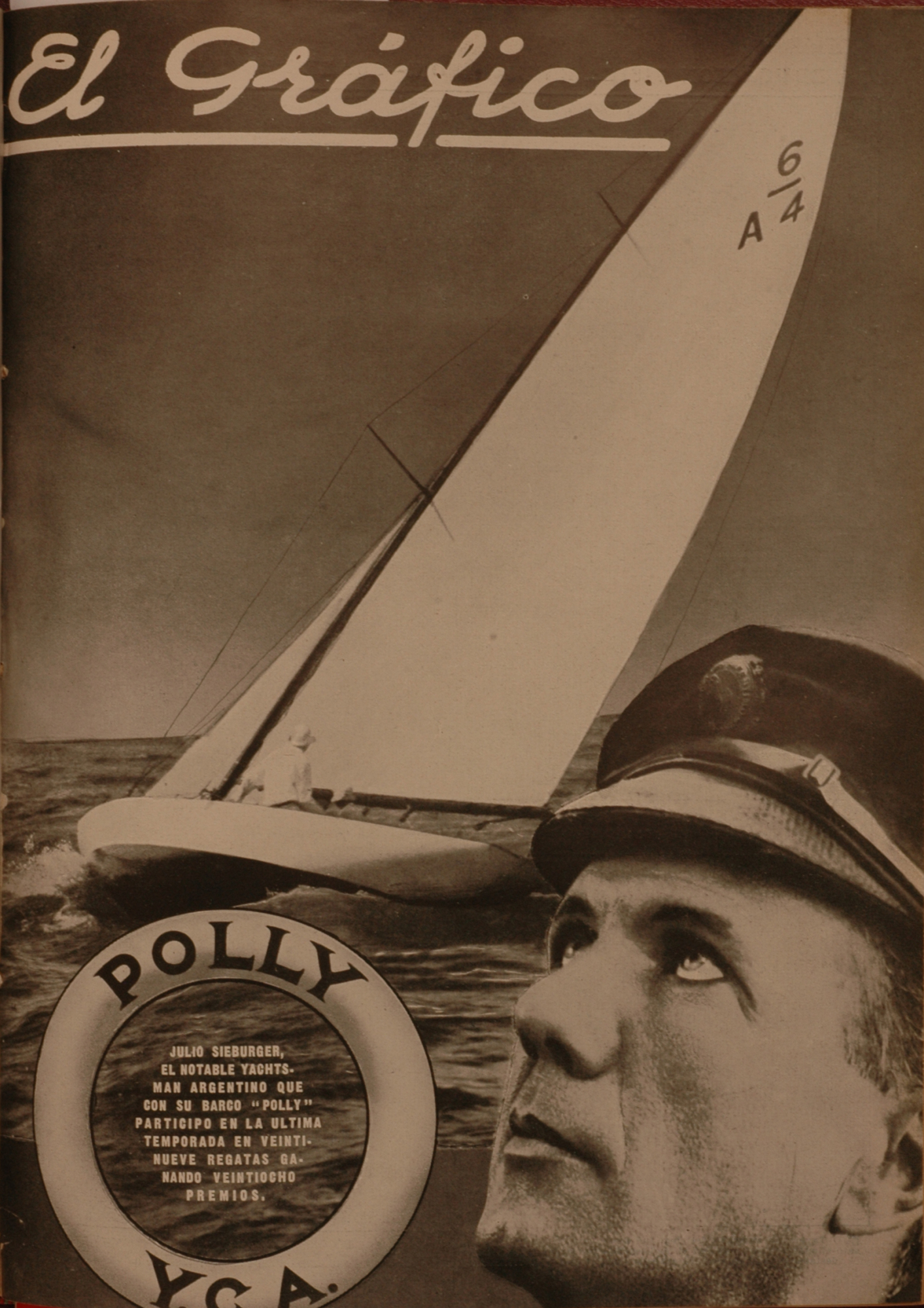
Julio Sieburger - The graphics 600.jpg

Julio Christian Sieburger Hadler (born 5 March 1892, date of death unknown) was an Argentine sailor and Olympic medalist. He competed at the 1936 and 1948 Olympics. He was born in Buenos Aires.

Sieburger was a member of the Argentine crew on Djinn that received a silver medal in the 6 metre class at the 1948 Summer Olympics in London. His teammates included his brother Enrique Sieburger, Sr. while his son Roberto Sieburger was also competing in a different event (Three Person Keelboat) in the first of his five Olympics.
