= Carlos Sieburger =

Argentine sailor

Personal information
- Born: 27 December 1921; Vicente López, Argentina
- Died: 1996 (aged 74–75)

Sport
- Sport: Sailing

Carlos Sieburger (27 December 1921 – 1996) was an Argentine sailor. He competed in the 5.5 Metre event at the 1960 Summer Olympics.
