= Basil Kelly (sailor) =

Bahamian sailor

Basil Trevor Kelly CBE (11 May 1930 – 11 August 2003) was a Bahamian former sailor who competed in the 1952 Summer Olympics, in the 1960 Summer Olympics, and in the 1964 Summer Olympics. He placed third at the Snipe World Championship in 1963.
