= Peder Lunde Sr. =

Norwegian sailor

Personal information
- Full name: Peder Eugen Lunde
- Born: 25 May 1918 Nordstrand, Norway
- Died: 26 December 2009 (aged 91)
- Spouse: Vibeke Lunde

Sport
- Sport: Sailing
Medal record
Sailing
Representing Norway
Olympic Games
Silver medal – second place	1952 Helsinki	5.5 metre class

Peder Eugen Lunde (25 May 1918 – 26 December 2009) was a Norwegian sailor and Olympic medalist. He was born in Nordstrand and represented the Royal Norwegian Yacht Club.

He received a silver medal in the 5.5 metre class with the boat Encore at the 1952 Summer Olympics in Helsinki, together with his wife Vibeke Lunde ("Babben") and Børre Falkum-Hansen.
