= Konstantin Aleksandrov (sailor) =

Soviet sailor

Personal information
- Nationality: Soviet
- Born: 7 July 1920 Saint Petersburg, Russia
- Died: 15 August 1987 (aged 67)

Sport
- Sport: Sailing

Konstantin Aleksandrov (7 July 1920 – 15 August 1987) was a Soviet sailor. He competed at the 1952, 1956, 1964 and the 1968 Summer Olympics.
