= Henri Copponex =

Swiss sailor (1907–1970)

- Born: 25 September 1907; Geneva, Switzerland
- Died: 9 June 1970 (aged 62)
- Scientific career
- Fields: Naval architect Regatta competitor, Olympic bronze medal winner in Rome in 1960 Honorary member of the Société Nautique de Genève (SNG)

Henri Copponex (25 September 1907 – 9 June 1970) was a Swiss naval architect, regatta competitor and an Olympic bronze medal winner for yacht racing in Rome in 1960.

== Biography ==
As a teenager, he was already designing models and testing them on water. Having become a civil engineer (with a degree from the Swiss Federal Institute of Technology in Zurich), he was also to become an emeritus naval architect and helmsman.

At the request of the Geneva Society for the Promotion of Yachting, Copponex designed the Moucheron in 1934, then the Lacustre in 1938. He also produced plans for Swedish 30 m2, 15 m2 SNS (Swiss National Series), and about thirty 5.5 m IR (International Rule), including the famous Ylliam X, Tam-Tam and Ballerina IV and V.

Following the success of the Lacustre, he designed the Espadon, which was to be, in his view, a more successful version of the Lacustre. In 1951, he again caused surprise by designing a catamaran. But Copponex was interested not only in racing boats. He also designed dinghies for life-saving societies, including those of Nyon, Saint-Prex, Morges and Le Bouveret. In 1969 Copponex designed his last boat, the Paladin.

During his sporting career he won about twelve national titles in 6 m IR, in 15 m2 SNS and in Lacustre. He took part in numerous international regattas: in 1928 at Cannes on a 6 m IR; at Genoa, where he won victory after victory in the 5.5 m IR series in 1952, 1958 and 1960. He represented Switzerland at the 1948 Olympic Games in Torquay (7th place in 6 m IR); then in 1952 at the Helsinki Olympic Games (10th place in 5.5 m IR). And it was at the Rome Olympic Games (Naples) in 1960 with the 5.5 m IR Ballerina IV that Henri Copponex, Manfred Metzger, the yacht's owner, and Pierre Girard won a bronze medal. It was exceptional that five of the sailing boats in the competition had been designed by Copponex.

The "prince of the lake," as one sports daily used to refer to him, became a legend throughout his lifetime because to this record. From the 1930s through the 1970s, Copponex's skill and charisma had tremendous impact on Geneva sailing. He was also admired for his humanity, modesty, and simplicity.

His premature death in 1970 deprived sailing enthusiasts of a sportsman and naval architect. Every year the Société Nautique de Genève holds the Copponex Memorial, a regatta in tribute of the deceased architect and sportsman.

== Association of Archives Henri Copponex ==
The Association of Archives Henri Copponex was constituted in 2006. It is headed up by Françoise Copponex, the daughter of Henri Copponex, and it also includes among the members of its committee: Pierre Girard, team member and a friend of Henri Copponex, vice-president, and Carinne Bertola, the curator of Lake Geneva museum. The association aims to support the conservation of Henri Copponex's work and organize various events to make it endure. In order to conserve the work of the naval architect, the Association of AHC has for the first project to digitize all existing plans (about 700 pieces).
