= Sailing at the 1968 Summer Olympics – 5.5 Metre =

Sailing at the Olympics

5.5 Metre at the Games of the XIX Olympiad
- Venue: Acapulco
- Dates: 14–21 October
- Competitors: 42 from 14 nations
- Teams: 14

Medalists
1st place, gold medalist(s)		Ulf Sundelin; Jörgen Sundelin; Peter Sundelin	Sweden
2nd place, silver medalist(s)		Louis Noverraz; Marcel Stern; Bernard Dunand	Switzerland
3rd place, bronze medalist(s)		Robin Aisher; Adrian Jardine; Paul Anderson	Great Britain

The 5.5 Metre was a sailing event on the Sailing at the 1968 Summer Olympics program in Acapulco. Seven races were scheduled. 42 sailors, on 14 boats, from 14 nations competed.

== Results ==
Rank	Helmsman (Country)	Crew	Country Code	Race I		Race II		Race III		Race IV		Race V		Race VI		Race VII		Total Points	Total -1
Rank	Helmsman (Country)	Crew	Country Code	Rank	Points	Rank	Points	Rank	Points	Rank	Points	Rank	Points	Rank	Points	Rank	Points	Total Points	Total -1
1st place, gold medalist(s)	Ulf Sundelin (SWE)	Jörgen Sundelin; Peter Sundelin	S	4	8	1	0	1	0	1	0	~~5~~	~~10~~	1	0	1	0	18	8
2nd place, silver medalist(s)	Louis Noverraz (SUI)	Bernard Dunand; Marcel Stern	Z	1	0	5	10	2	3	2	3	4	8	4	8	~~DNF~~	~~20~~	52	32
3rd place, bronze medalist(s)	Robin Aisher (GBR)	Paul Anderson; Adrian Jardine	K	6	11.7	2	3	4	8	3	5.7	~~8~~	~~14~~	3	5.7	3	5.7	53.8	39.8
4	Rudolf Harmstorf (FRG)	Karl-August Stolze; Harald Stein	G	2	3	3	5.7	5	10	~~9~~	~~15~~	3	5.7	9	15	4	8	62.4	47.4
5	Giuseppe Zucchinetti (ITA)	Antonio Carattino; Domenico Carattino	I	3	5.7	7	13	3	5.7	~~DNF~~	~~20~~	1	0	6	11.7	9	15	71.1	51.1
6	Stanley Leibel (CAN)	Ernest Weiss; Jack Hasen	KC	~~DNF~~	~~20~~	9	15	12	18	7	13	2	3	2	3	10	16	88	68
7	William Solomons (AUS)	James Hardy; Gilbert Kaufman	KA	5	10	4	8	6	11.7	6	11.7	~~12~~	~~18~~	12	18	5	10	87.4	69.4
8	Gardner Cox (USA)	Steve Colgate; Stuart Walker	US	7	13	8	14	8	14	4	8	~~9~~	~~15~~	8	14	6	11.7	89.7	74.7
9	Konstantin Alexandrov (URS)	Vladimir Aleksandrov; Konstantin Melgunov	SR	~~13~~	~~19~~	6	11.7	11	17	5	10	7	13	7	13	7	13	96.7	77.7
10	Pierre Breteche (FRA)	Gilles Buck; Roger Tiriau	F	9	15	10	16	7	13	~~12~~	~~18~~	11	17	10	16	2	3	98	80
11	HrH Crownprince Harald (NOR)	Stein Arne Foyen; Eirik Johannessen	N	10	16	~~DSQ~~	~~22~~	10	16	10	16	10	16	5	10	11	17	113	91
12	Carlos Braniff (MEX)	Antonio Recamier; Iker Belausteguigoitia	MX	11	17	~~12~~	~~18~~	9	15	11	17	6	11.7	11	17	8	14	109.7	91.7
13	William Berntsen (DEN)	Erik Johansen; Christian Hansen	D	8	14	11	17	13	19	8	14	13	19	~~14~~	~~20~~	12	18	121	101
14	Lee Gentil (PUR)	James Fairbank; Hovey Freeman	PR	12	18	13	19	~~14~~	~~20~~	13	19	14	20	13	19	13	19	134	114

DNF = Did Not Finish, DNS= Did Not Start, DSQ = Disqualified
= Male, = Female

=== Daily standings ===
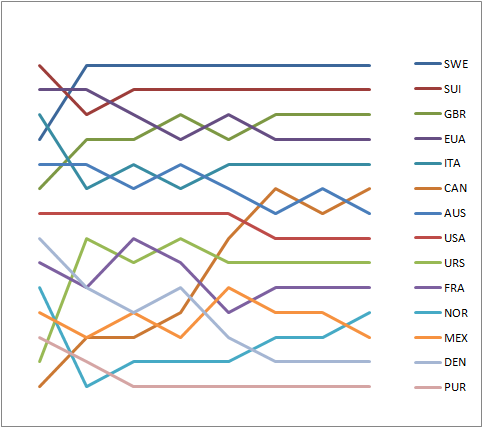
Graph showing the daily standings in the 5.5 Metre during the 1968 Summer Olympics

== Conditions at Acapulco ==
Of the total of three race areas were needed during the Olympics in Acapulco. Each of the classes was new Olympic scoring system.

Date	Race	Weather	Temperature (Celsius)	Wind direction (deg)	Wind speed (kn)	Sea	Current (kn-deg)
14 October 1968	I	Fair	29	275	15	Choppy	0.2-120
15 October 1968	II	Fair	29.5	295	15	Calm	0.2-160
16 October 1968	III	Fair	28.5	285	8	Calm	0.2-130
17 October 1968	IV	Fair	29.5	235	6	Calm	0.1-300
19 October 1968	V	Normal	29.8	180	6	Calm	0.3-326
20 October 1968	VI	Fair	30	250	5	Calm	0.7-275
21 October 1968	VII	Cloudy	28.5	285	10	Choppy	1-110
