= Vladimir Aleksandrov =

Vladimir Aleksandrov may refer to:

- Vladimir Aleksandrov (bobsleigh)
- Vladimir Aleksandrov (sailor)
- Vladimir Alexandrov, Soviet/Russian physicist
