= Theobald Stein =

Danish sculptor (1829–1901)

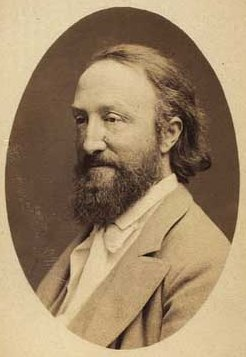
- Theobald Stein photographed by Hansen, Schou & Weller
- Born: 7 February 1829; Copenhagen, Denmark
- Died: 16 November 1901 (aged 72); Copenhagen, Denmark
- Resting place: Cemetery of Holmen
- Education: Royal Danish Academy of Fine Arts
- Known for: Sculpting
- Awards: Thorvaldsen Medal (1860)

Signature
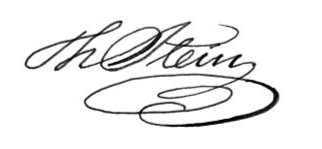

Theobald Stein (7 February 1829 – 16 November 1901) was a Danish sculptor. He was a professor at the Royal Danish Academy of Fine Arts and served as its director from 1883 to 1886.

Among his most well-known works are the Niels Juel statue at Holmens Kanal and the Ludvig Holberg statue outside the Royal Danish Theatre, both in Copenhagen.

== Biography ==
=== Early life and education ===
Theobald Stein was born on 7 February 1829 in Copenhagen to Sophus August Vilhelm Stein, surgeon and professor in anatomy at the Royal Danish Academy of Fine Arts. His younger brothers were the chemist Valdemar Stein and Harald Stein, Bishop of Funen from 1889 to 1899. Theobald Stein was intended for an academic career but from an early age he showed great interest in drawing and upon recommendation from the many artists who visited the Steins' home, he was therefore instead enrolled at the Academy's drawing school at age 12. At the same time he trained as a sculptor with Christian Christensen, and after Christensen's death in 1845 with Herman Wilhelm Bissen. He was accepted into the model school in 1846 and won both the small and the large gold medal in 1848, as well as both a Neuhausen Award and the Academy's small gold medal for a statuette of Ludvig Holberg in 1851.

=== Years in Rome ===
The proceeds from his work and economic support from the Academy enabled him to spend four productive and successful years in Rome. His work from this period includes Neapolitean Fishing Boy, carrying a Pitcher which was rewarded with a Thorvaldsen Medal in 1860. A bronze cast of it was originally placed by Carl Jacobsen's Albertina Trust in the no longer existing Aborreparken in Copenhagen but has later been moved to Grønningen at Kastellet.

=== Career at the Academy ===
In 1861, the year after his return to Copenhagen from Italy, Stein became a member of the Academy and when his father died in 1867 he succeeded him as docent in anatomy. In 1874 he became a titular professor and in 1881 he assumed the position of professor in sculpture at the Model School. From 1883 to 1887 he served as Director of the Academy.

== Selected works ==
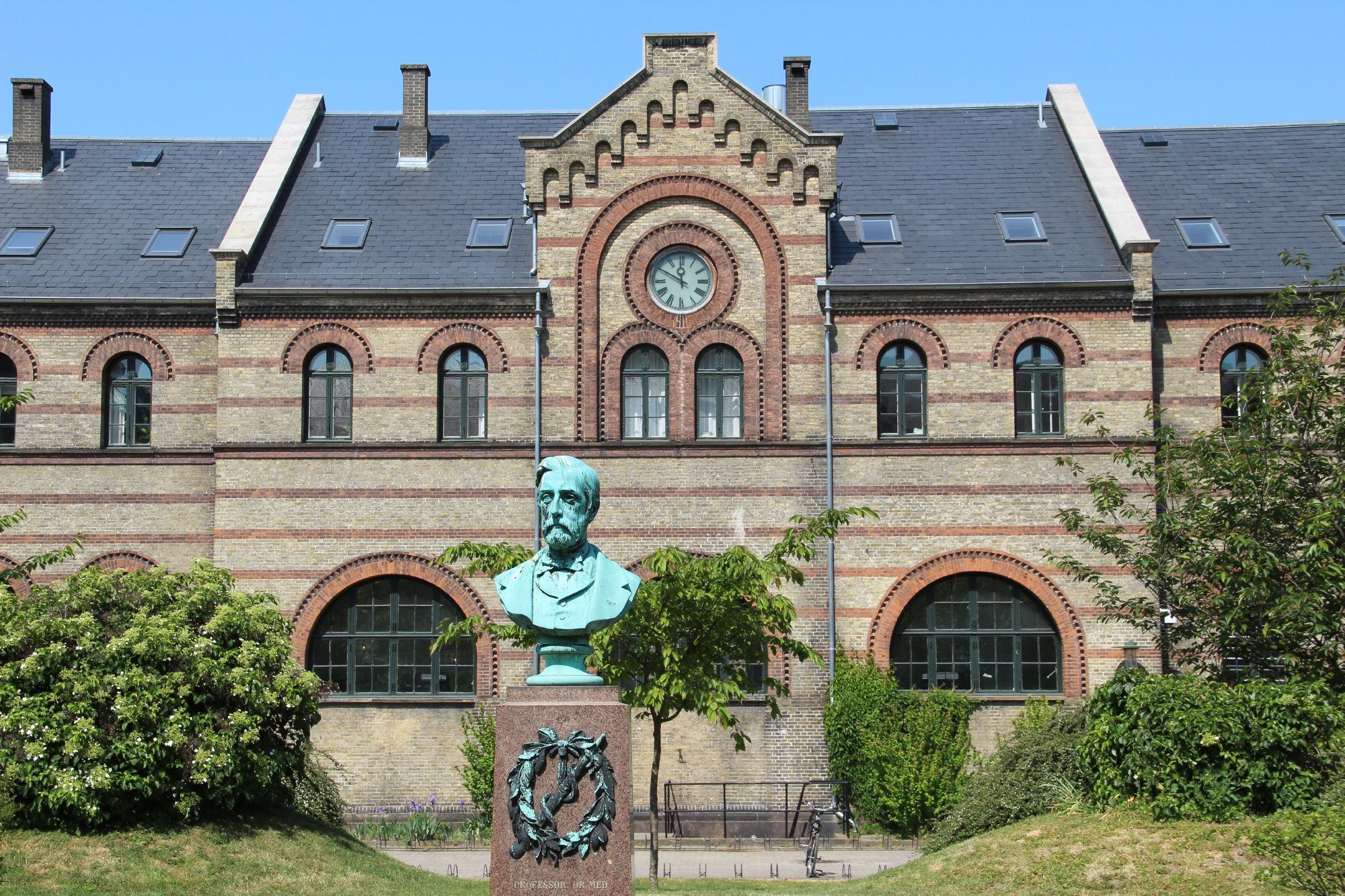
Bust of Valdemar Holmer in front of the former Copenhagen Municipal Hospital.

- Jason, der bemægtiger sig det gyldne Skind, medens Orpheus og Medea trylle Dragen i Søvn (1850)
- Ludvig Holberg (1850)
- Den blinde Kong Oedipus, der vandrer i Landflygtighed, ledet af Datteren Antigone (1853)
- Johannes Ewald (1855)
- En ung Pige, som kaster Korn til Kyllinger (1856)
- En ung Pige, som plukker en Stjærneblomst itu
- Kong Skjold som Barn
- Loke og Sigyn
- C.F. Harsdorff (1867)
- David med Sauls Vandkrukke og Spyd (1869)
- August Bournonville
- Jens Jacob Asmussen Worsaae
- Rasmus Nyerup (Nationalmuseet)
- Jacob Peter Mynster
- Hyrden Faustulus med Romullus og Remus

=== Public sculptures ===
- Neapolitean Fishing Boy, carrying a Pitcher, Grønningen, Copenhagen
- Ludvig Holberg, Royal Danish Theatre, Kongens Nytorv, Copenhagen (1875)
- Asmus Jacob Carstens, Ny Carlsberg Glyptotek (1880)
- Niels Juel, Holmens Kanal (1889)
- John Wycliff, Frederick's Church, Copenhagen (1883–84)
- Martin Luther, Frederick's Church, Copenhagen (1885–87)
- Jan Hus, Frederick's Church, Copenhagen (185-87)
- Suenson Monument, Nyboder, Copenhagen (1889)
- Ansgar, Frederick's Church, Copenhagen (1894)
- Little Gunver, Kongens Have, Copenhagen (1898)
- Edward Tesdorpf, Landbohøjskolens Botaniske Have, Copenhagen 1901

== Gallery ==
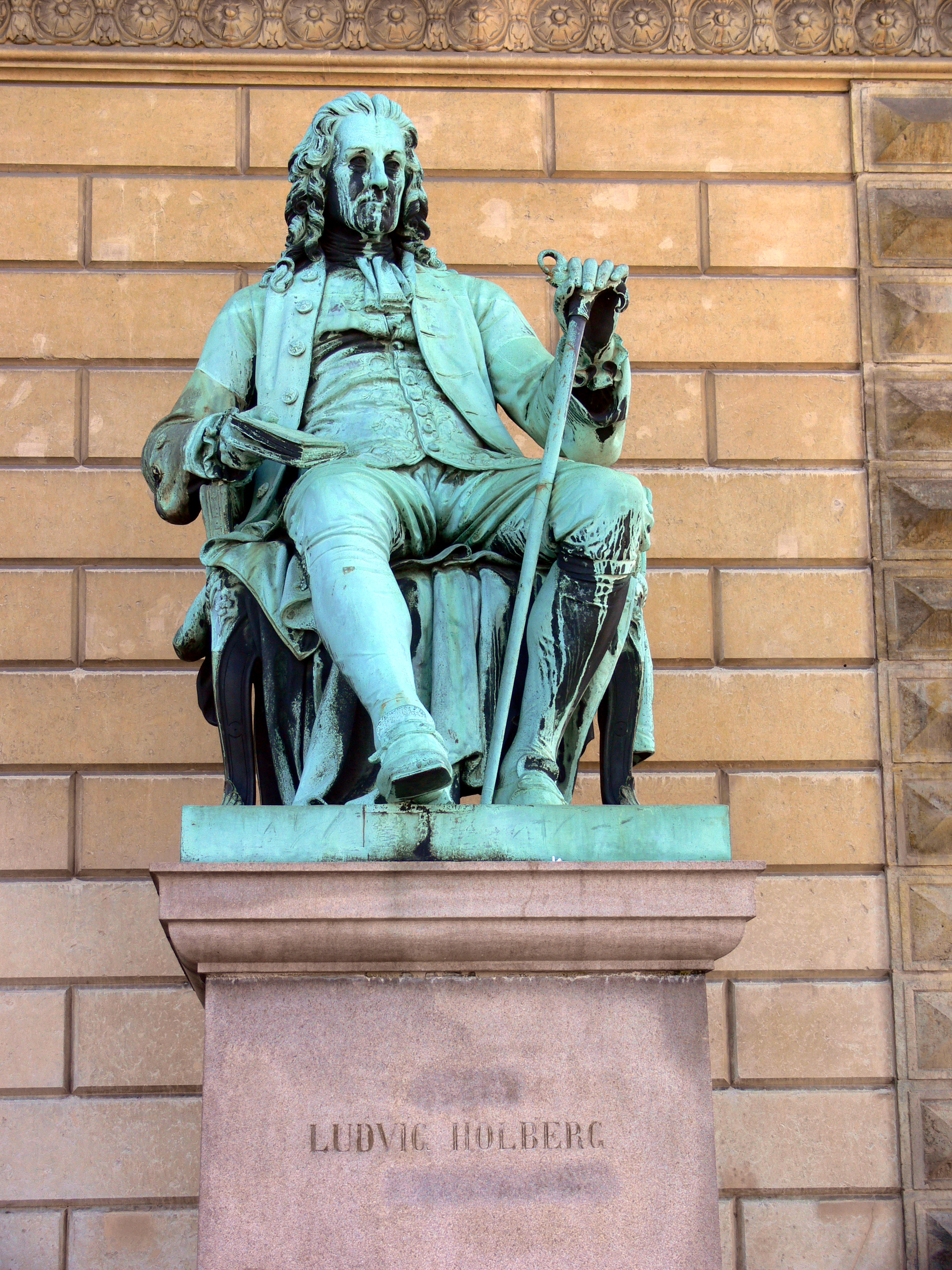
Ludvig Holberg, Royal Danish Theatre, Kongens Nytorv, Copenhagen (1875)

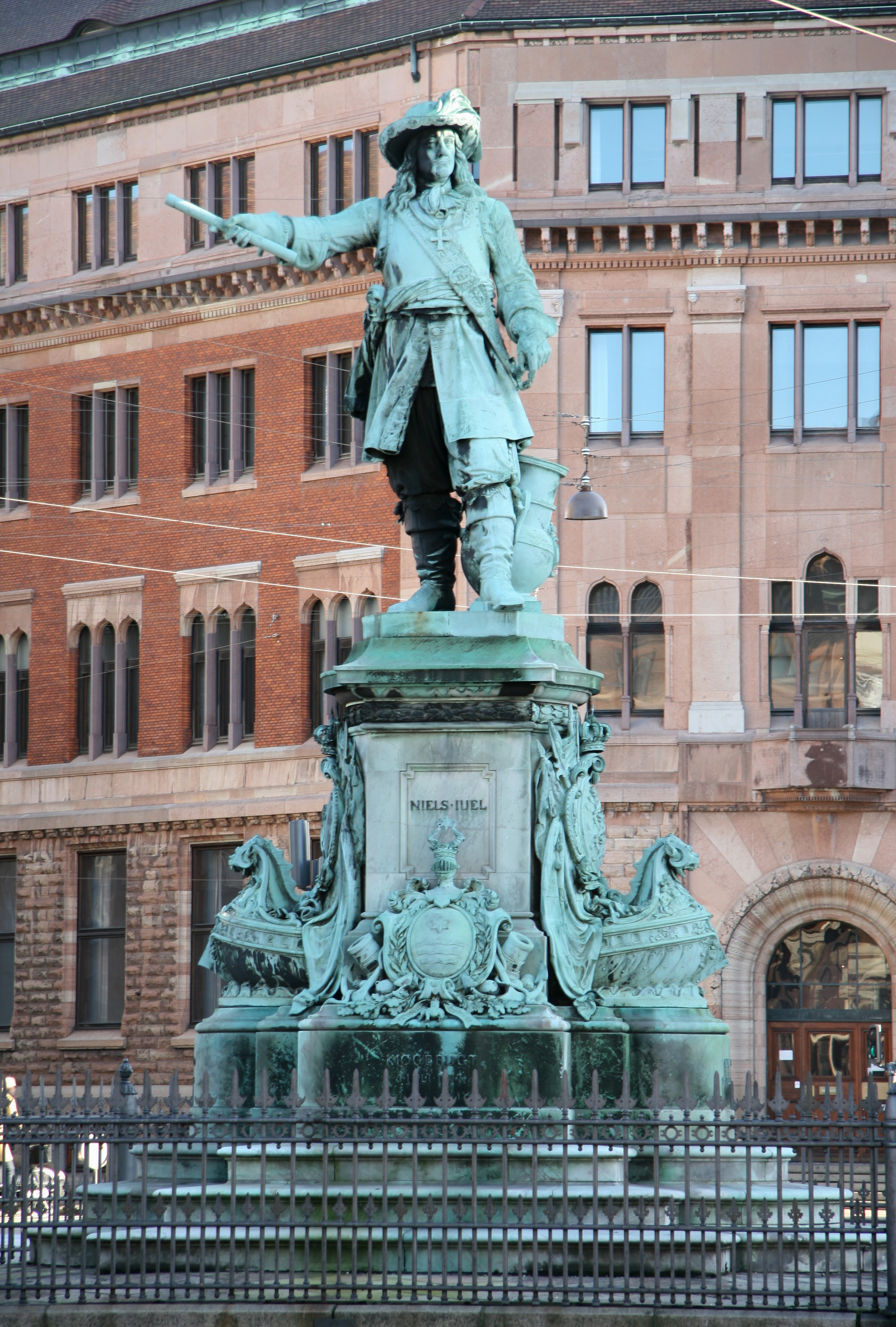
Niels Juel, Holmens Kanal (1989)

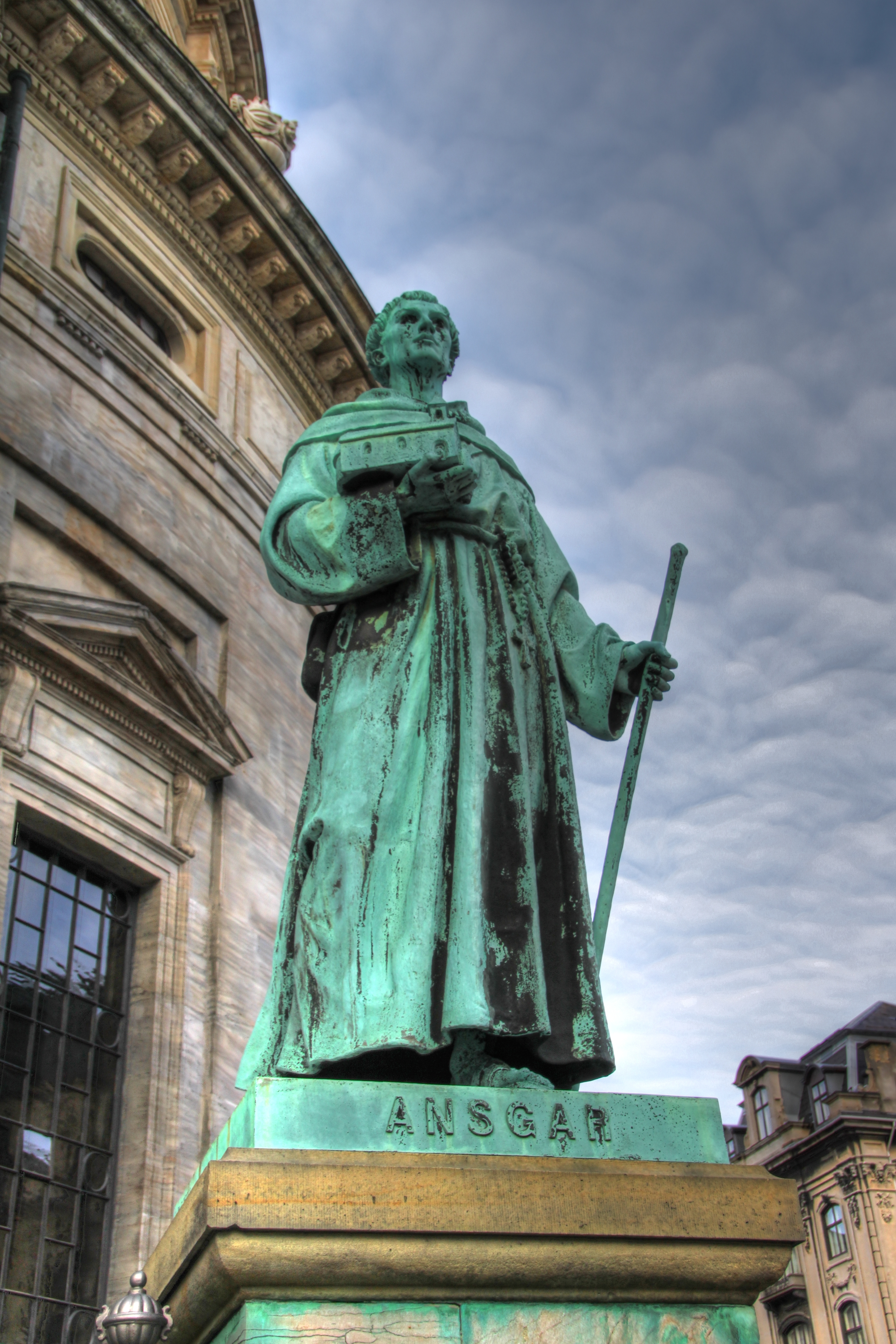
Ansgar, Frederick's Church, Copenhagen (1894)

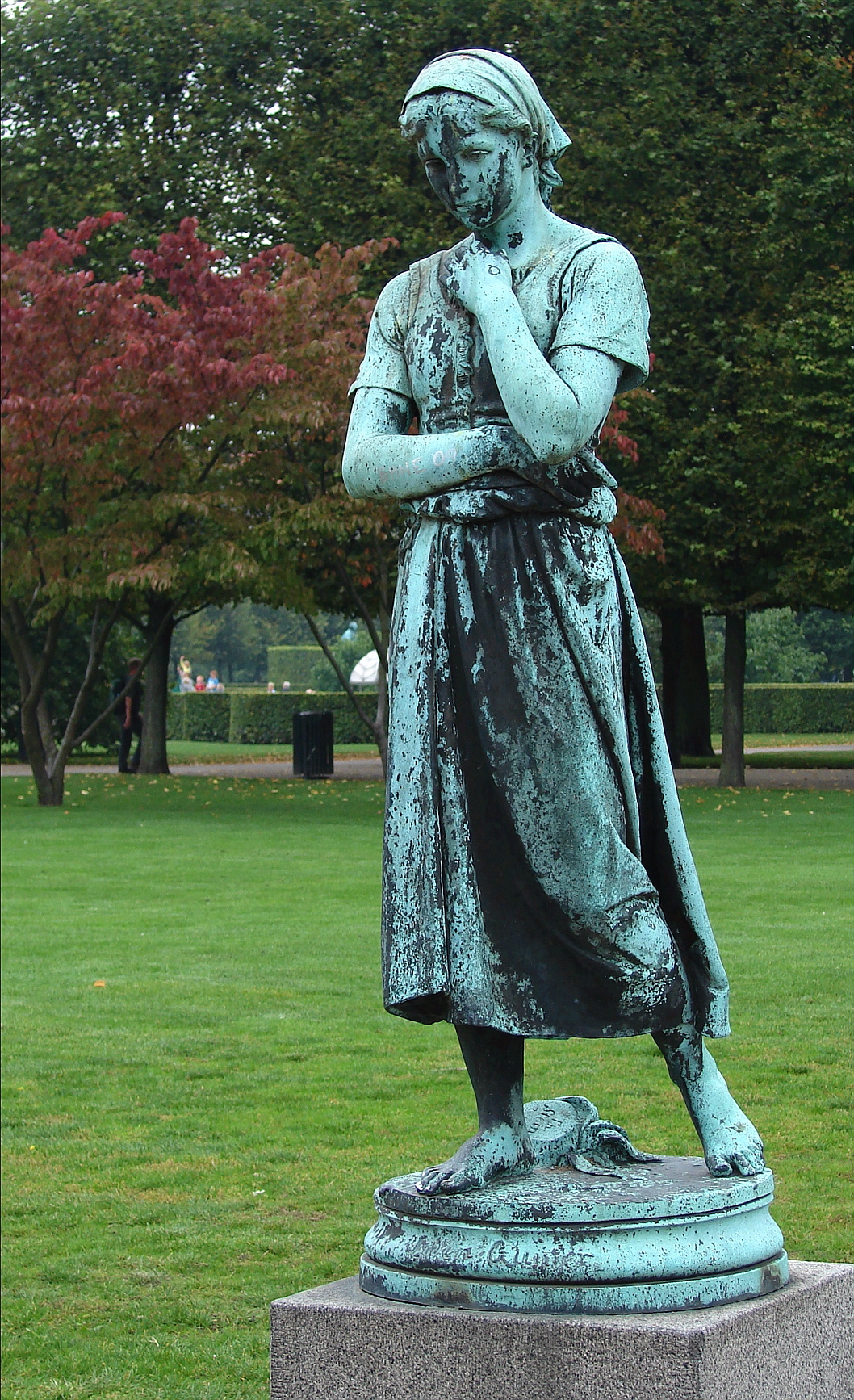
Little Gunver, Kongens Have, Copenhagen (1898)

Cultural offices
Preceded by Otto Bache	Director of the Royal Danish Academy of Fine Arts; 1883–1886	Succeeded by Otto Bache
