= Steve Colgate =

American sailor

Personal information
- Nationality: American
- Born: June 25, 1935 (age 91) New York, New York, United States

Sport
- Sport: Sailing

Steve Colgate (born June 25, 1935) is an American sailor. He competed in the 5.5 Metre event at the 1968 Summer Olympics.

Colgate was president of the International Sailing Schools Association between 1997 and 2003.
