= Antonio Recamier =

Mexican sailor (born 1930)

Personal information
- Born: 3 February 1930 (age 95); Mexico City, Mexico

Sport
- Sport: Sailing

Antonio Recamier (born 3 February 1930) is a Mexican sailor. He competed in the 5.5 Metre event at the 1968 Summer Olympics.
