= Otto Bache =

Danish painter

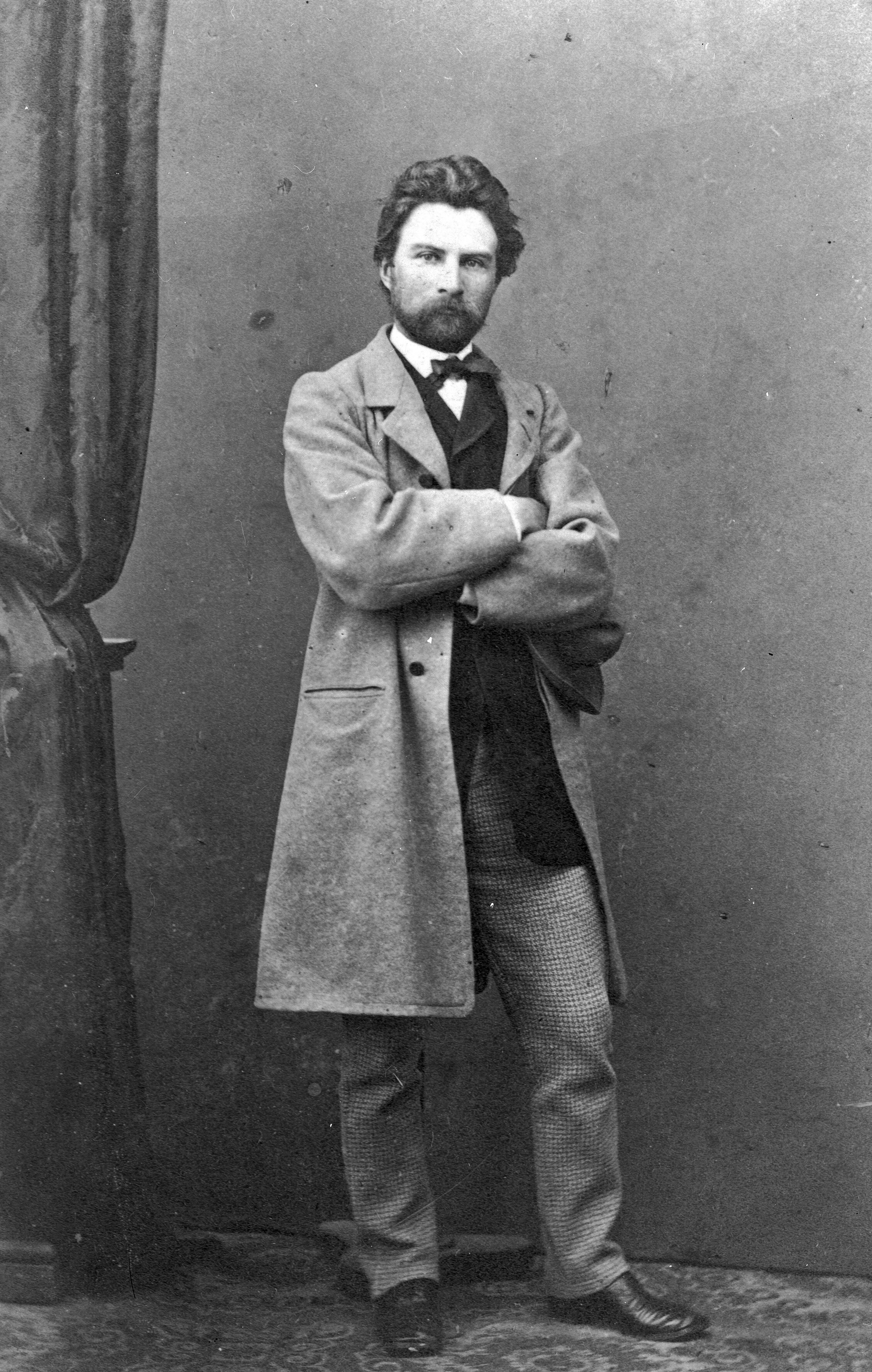
- Bache in 1868
- Born: 21 August 1839; Roskilde, Denmark
- Died: 28 June 1927 (aged 87); Copenhagen, Denmark
- Resting place: Cemetery of Holmen, Copenhagen
- Education: Royal Danish Academy of Fine Arts
- Movement: Realism

Otto Bache (21 August 1839 – 28 June 1927) was a Danish Realist painter. Many of his works depict key events in Danish history.

== Biography ==
At age eleven he received a dispensation and was admitted into the Royal Danish Academy of Fine Arts, studying under Wilhelm Marstrand, among others.

In 1866, he received the academy's travel grant and went to Paris and later to Italy. His stay in Paris had a particularly deep impact on his work, turning it in a direction characterized by more freedom, more colour, stronger light, and broader scope. Upon his return in 1868, he married Clara Charlotte Elise Haagensen on August 18

He was named a Commander in the Order of the Dannebrog and later was awarded the Dannebrogordenens Hæderstegn.

He received early recognition as a portrait painter but he also showed great interest in painting animal motifs, gradually also turning to genre works and history painting.

In 1880 Bache became a professor, and then the director of The Royal Danish Academy of Fine Arts between the years of 1890–1892, 1896–1899, 1905–1906 before being succeeded by Vilhelm Bissen in 1906.

He was the father of lawyer Niels Haagensen Bache.

== Gallery ==
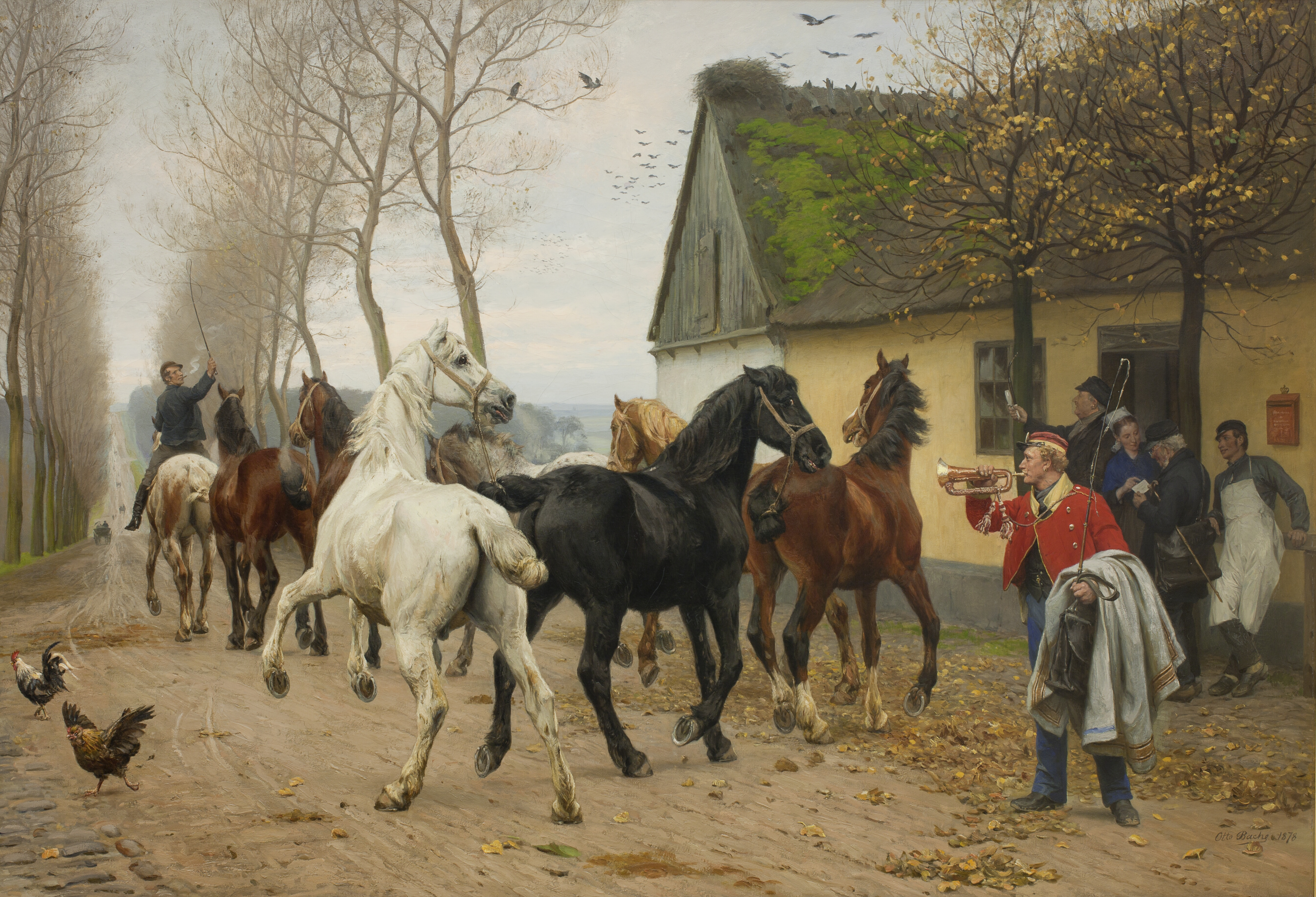
A Pack of Horses Outside an Inn

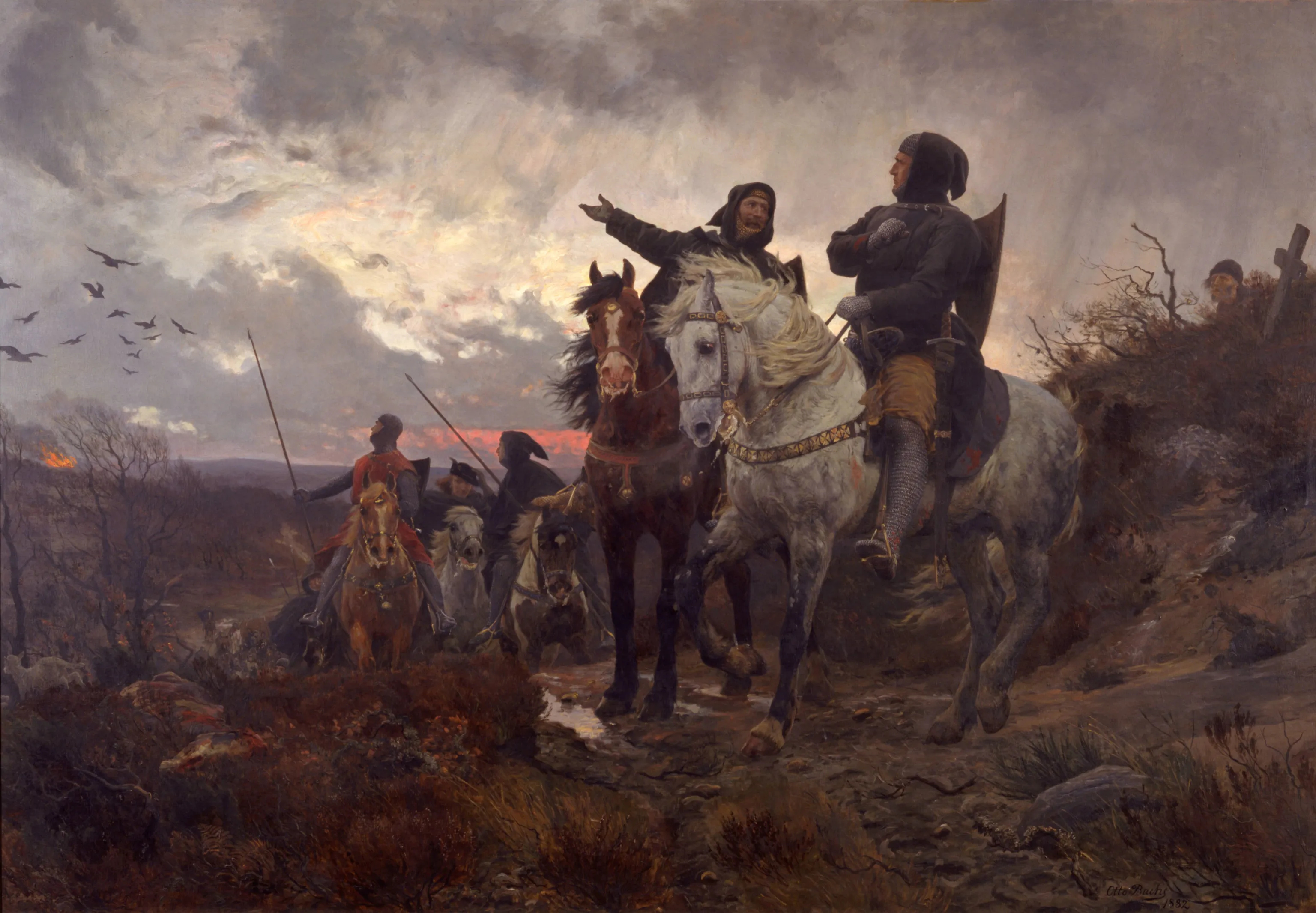
The Conspirators Ride from Finderup After the Murder of Eric Klipping

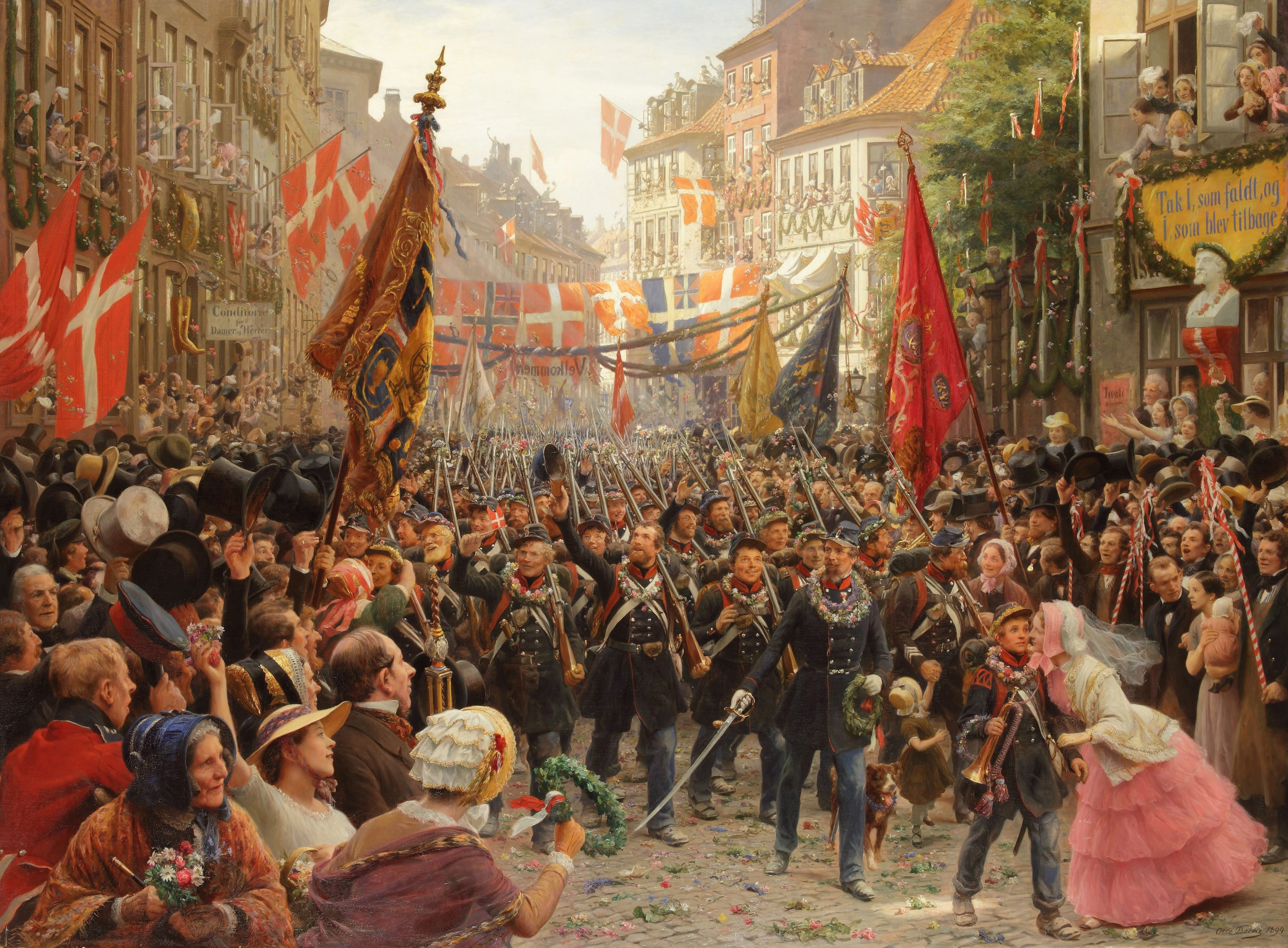
Danish Soldiers Return to Copenhagen in 1848

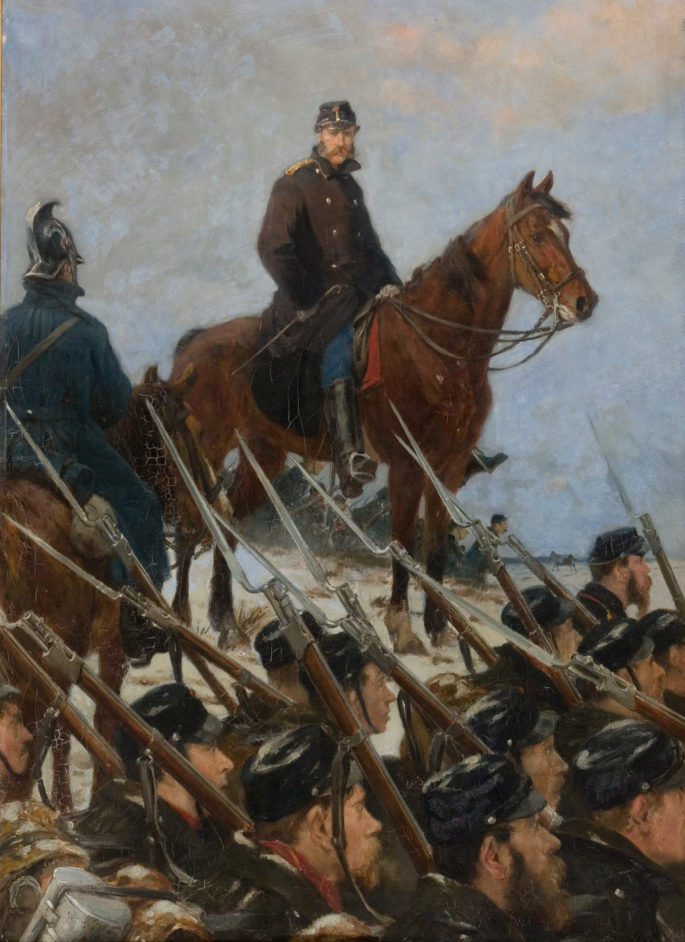
Colonel Müller at Sankelmark Lake

Cultural offices
Preceded by Ferdinand Meldahl	Director of the Royal Danish Academy of Fine Arts; 1890–1892	Succeeded by Theobald Stein
Preceded by Theobald Stein	Director of the Royal Danish Academy of Fine Arts; 1896–1899	Succeeded by Ferdinand Meldahl
Preceded by Vilhelm Bissen	Director of the Royal Danish Academy of Fine Arts; 1905–1906	Succeeded by Vilhelm Bissen
