= Peter Nicolai Arbo =

Norwegian painter (1831–1892)

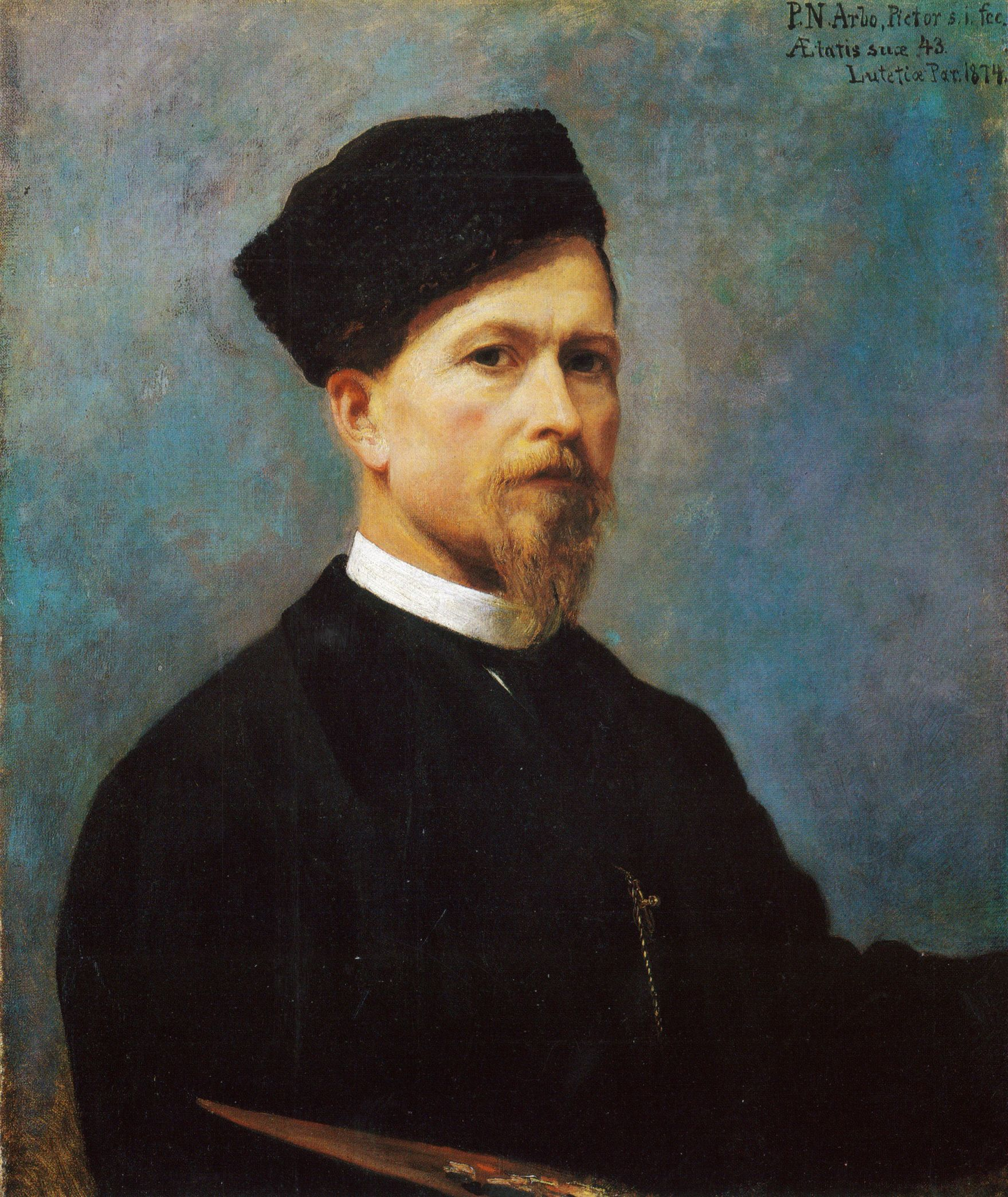
- Self-portrait, 1874
- Born: Peter Nicolai Arbo; 18 June 1831; Drammen, Norway
- Died: 14 October 1892 (aged 61); Oslo, Norway
- Education: Kunstakademie Düsseldorf

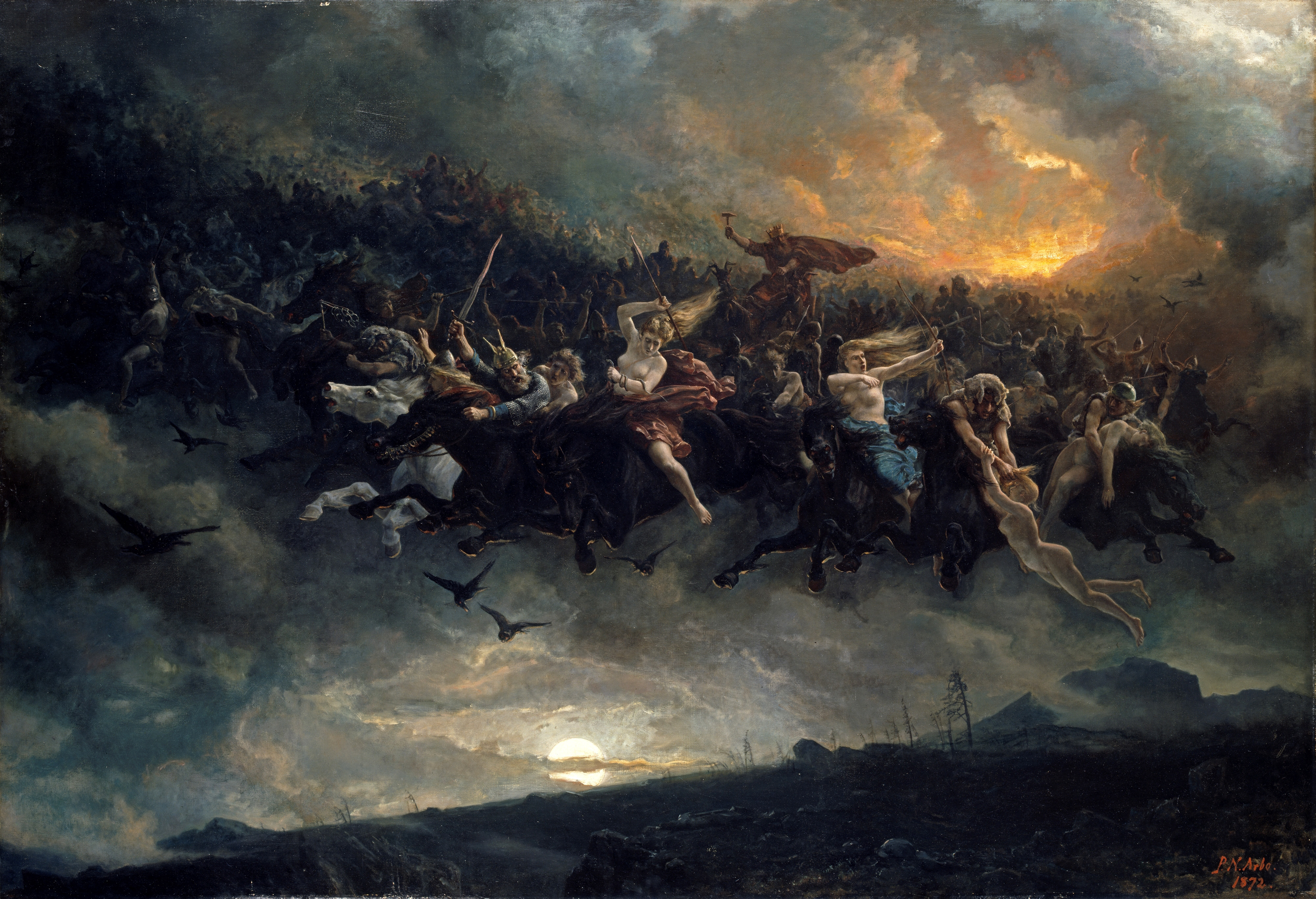
The Wild Hunt of Odin, a Norse version of Wild Hunt (1872), Oslo

Peter Nicolai Arbo(18 June 1831 – 14 October 1892) was a Norwegian historical painter, who specialized in portraits and large narrative scenes from Norwegian history and Norse mythology. His best known work is The Wild Hunt of Odin (Oslo), a dramatic subject based on the Wild Hunt legend and Valkyrie, the two versions of which (in Stockholm and Oslo) depict a female figure from Norse mythology.

== Biography ==
Peter Nicolai Arbo grew up at Gulskogen Manor in Gulskogen, a borough in Drammen, Norway. He was the son of headmaster Christian Fredrik Arbo (1791–1868) and his wife Marie Christiane von Rosen. His brother Carl Oscar Eugen Arbo was a military medical doctor and a pioneer in Norwegian anthropologic studies. Arbo's childhood home, Gulskogen, was built in 1804 as a summer residence for his older cousin, lumber dealer and industrialist Peter Nicolai Arbo.

Arbo started his art education with a year at the Art School operated by Frederik Ferdinand Helsted (1809–1875) in Copenhagen (1851–1852). After this, he studied at the art academy in Düsseldorf. From 1853 to 1855 he studied under of Karl Ferdinand Sohn, professor of Kunstakademie Düsseldorf, and from 1857 to 1858 under Emil Hünten who was a battle and animal painter. At Düsseldorf he was for some time a private student of the religious painter, Otto Mengelberg. He had contact with Adolph Tidemand and became a good friend of Hans Gude both of whom were professors at the art academy in Düsseldorf. He is associated with the Düsseldorf school of painting.

In 1861 Arbo returned to Norway and the following year he went on a study trip together with Gude and Frederik Collett. In 1863 he painted the first version of Horse flock on the high mountains, a motif he later on took up again several times. The version from 1889 is at the National Museum of Art, Architecture and Design (Norwegian: Nasjonalmuseet for kunst, arkitektur og design) in Oslo and is considered one of the most important of his works.

From 1863 he lived in Paris until 1870, when he moved back to Norway and settled in Oslo where he was appointed director of the Art School.

In 1866 he was appointed Knight of the Royal Norwegian Order of St. Olav and Knight of the Order of Vasa. He held numerous positions, including as a juror in Stockholm in 1866 and Philadelphia in 1876, and was Commissioner of the Viennese art department exhibition in 1873. He was also a member of the National Gallery Company from 1875 and director of the Oslo Kunstforening (Oslo Art Society) from 1882 until his death.

== Legacy ==
Drammens Museum (Norwegian: Drammens museum for kunst og kulturhistorie) is located in the heart of Drammen, on the southern side of the Drammen River. In earlier years this was an area of elegant country houses on the magnificent landed property known as Marienlyst. Exhibits of the museum include items from the historical and cultural background of Norway. Drammen museum consists of five departments including Gulskogen Manor, the childhood home Peder Nicolai Arbo, where some of his works are on display.

His works can also be found in private collections and at the Nasjonalmuseet (National Museum of Art, Architecture and Design).

== Gallery ==
Paintings by Peter Nicolai Arbo

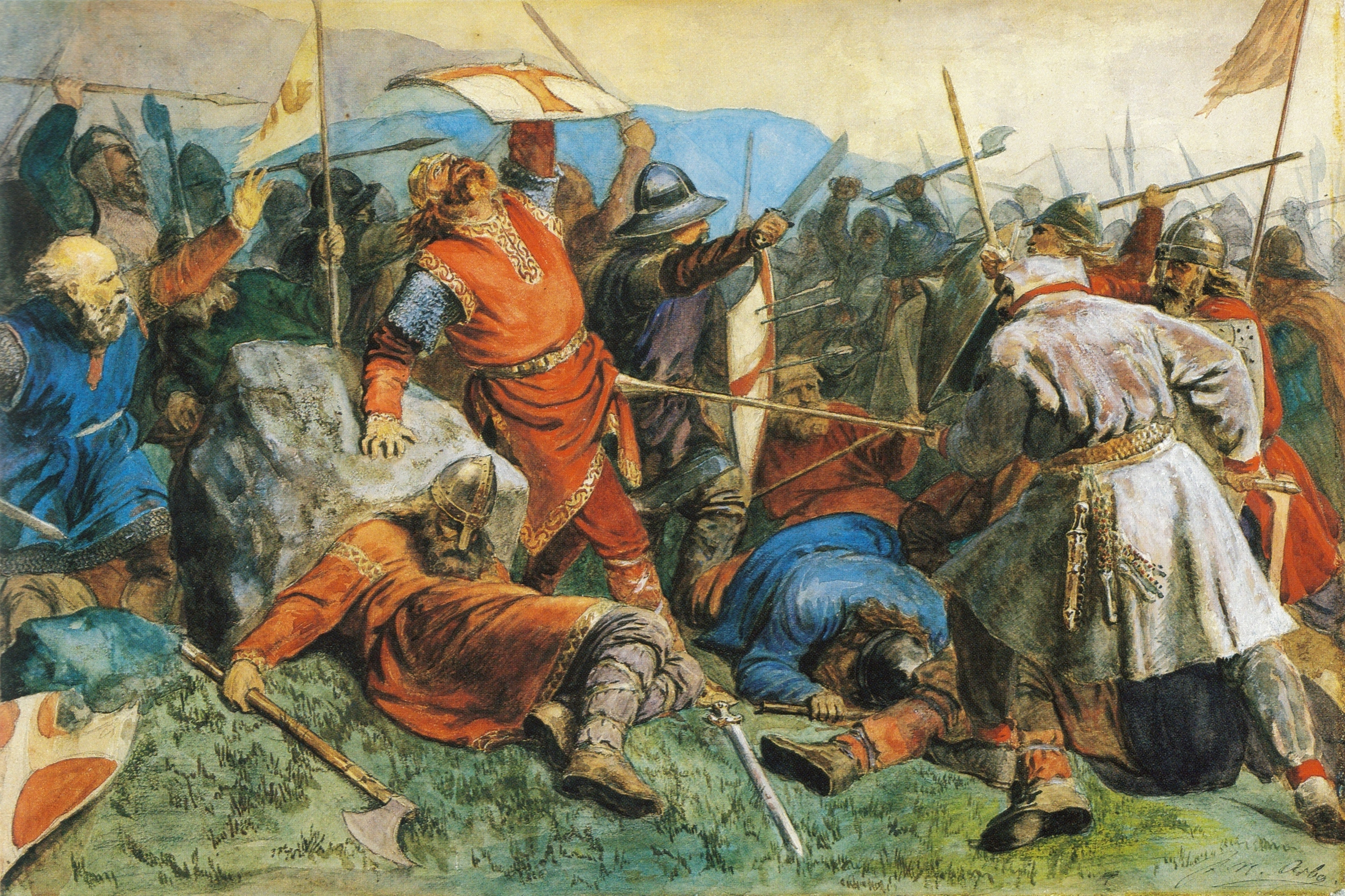
Saint Olav at the Battle of Stiklestad (1859)

Håkon the Good (1860)

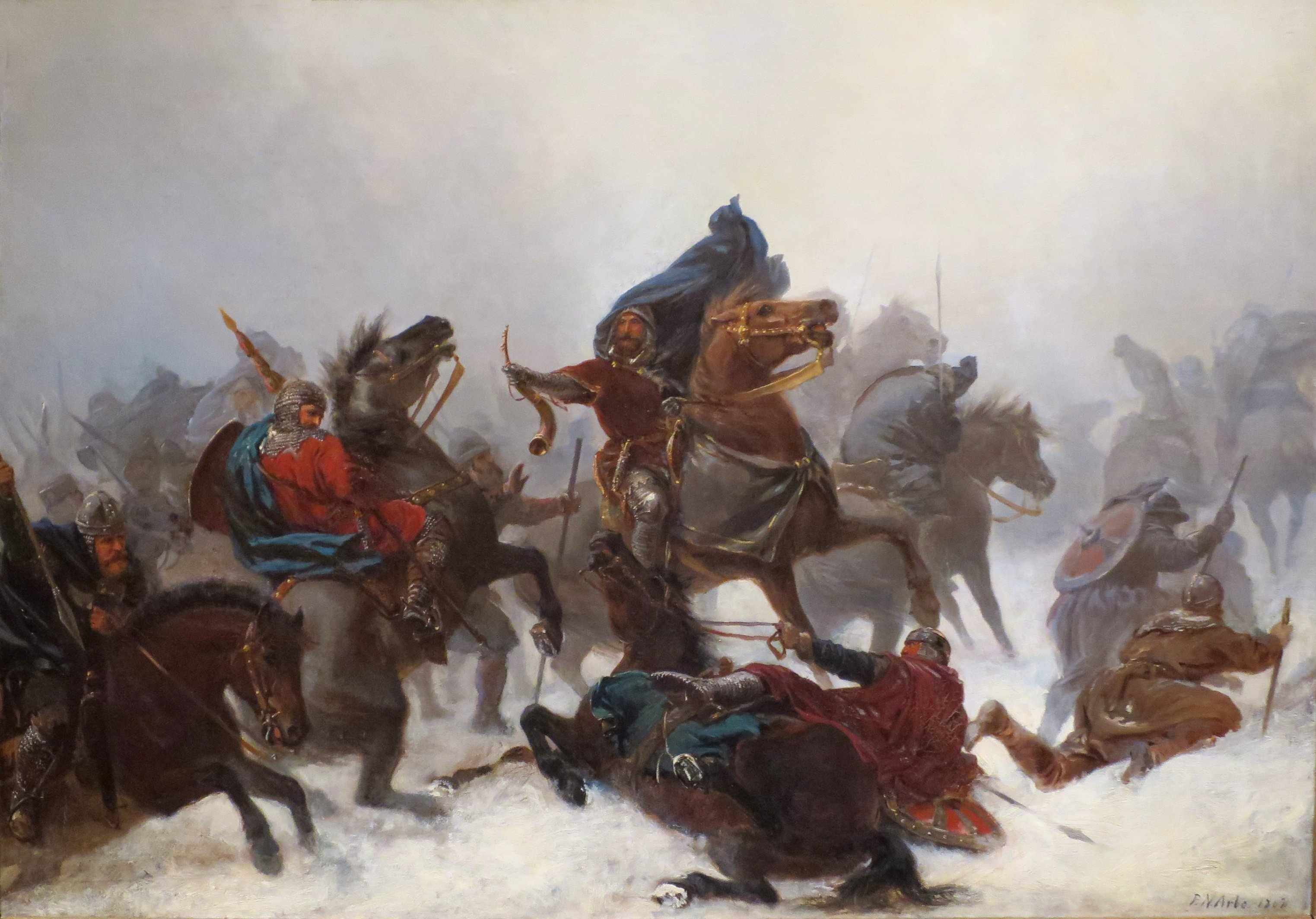
King Sverre's march over the Vossefjell (1861)

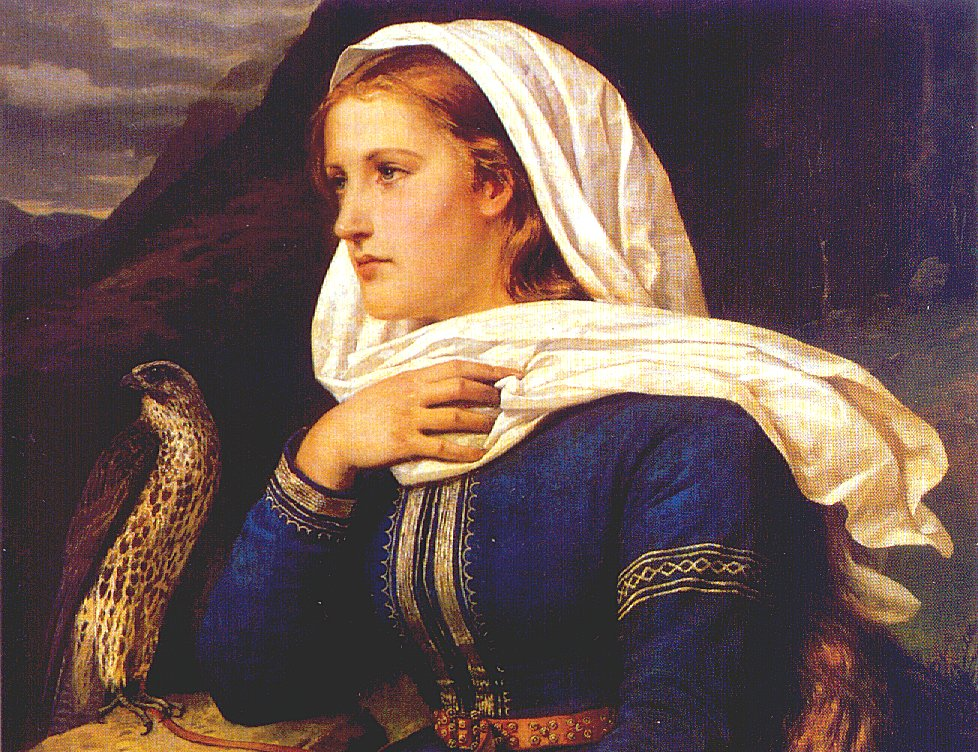
Ingeborg, Frithjof's beloved (1868)

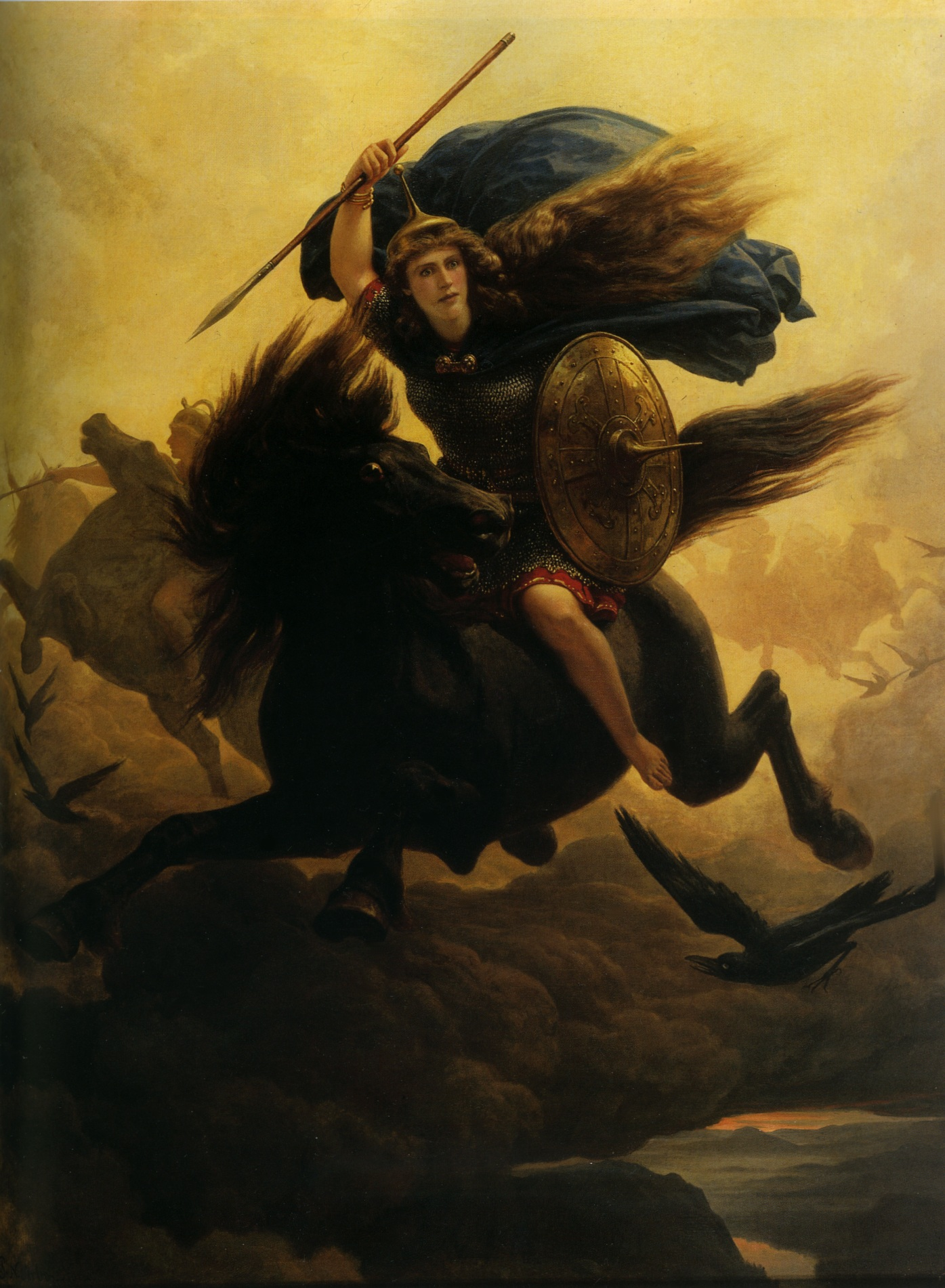
Valkyrie (1864 version)

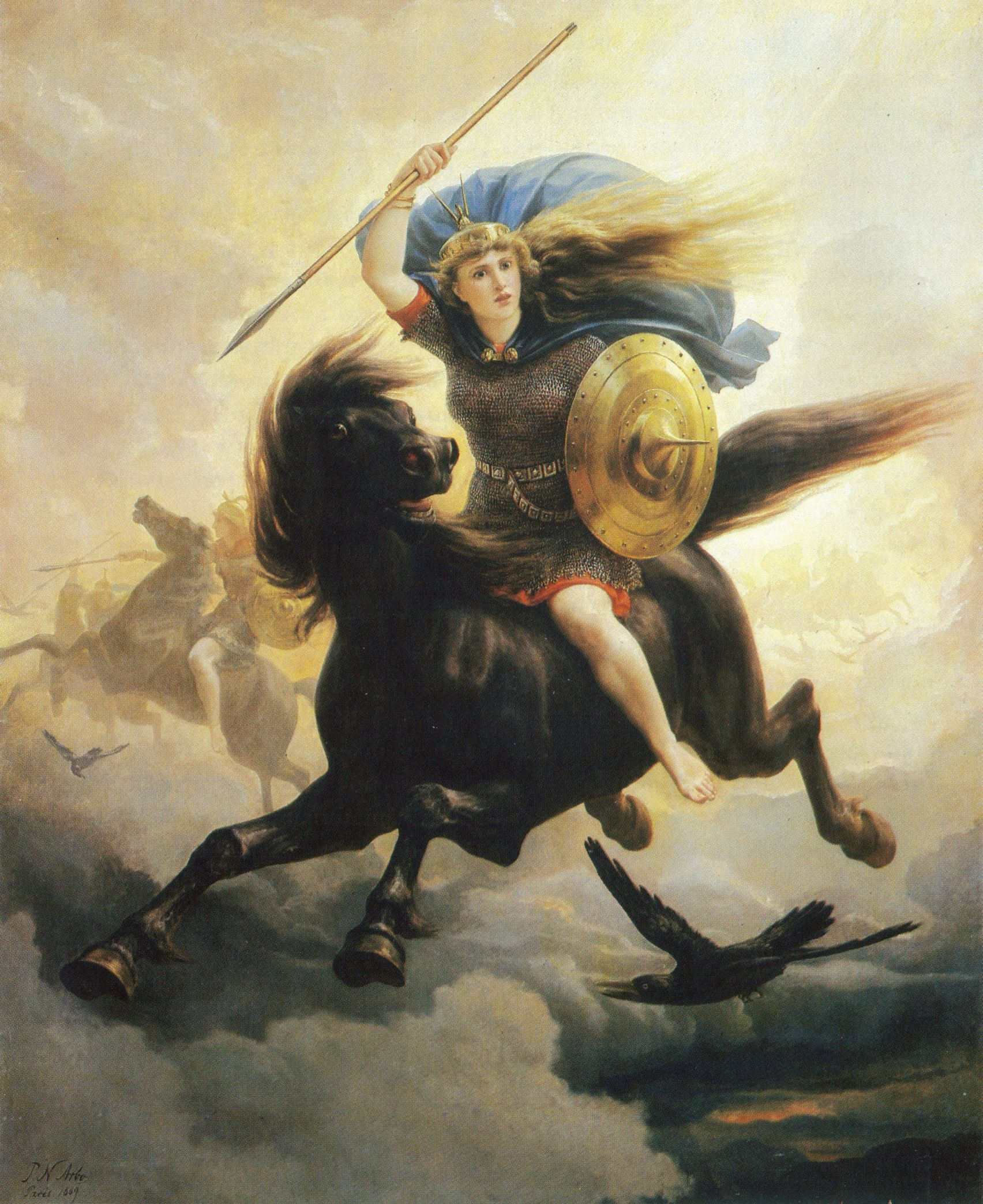
Valkyrie (1869 version)

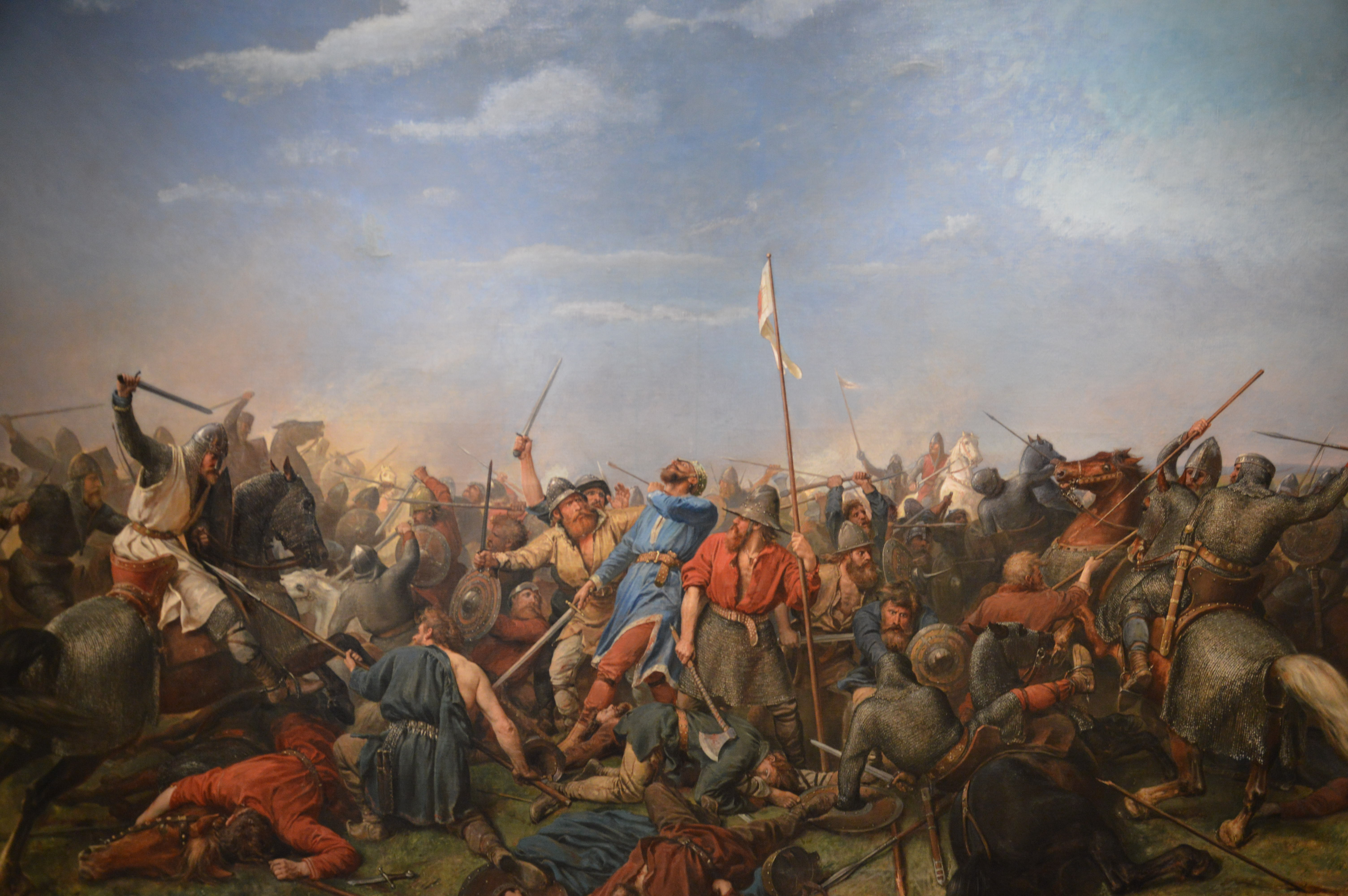
Battle of Stamford Bridge (1870)

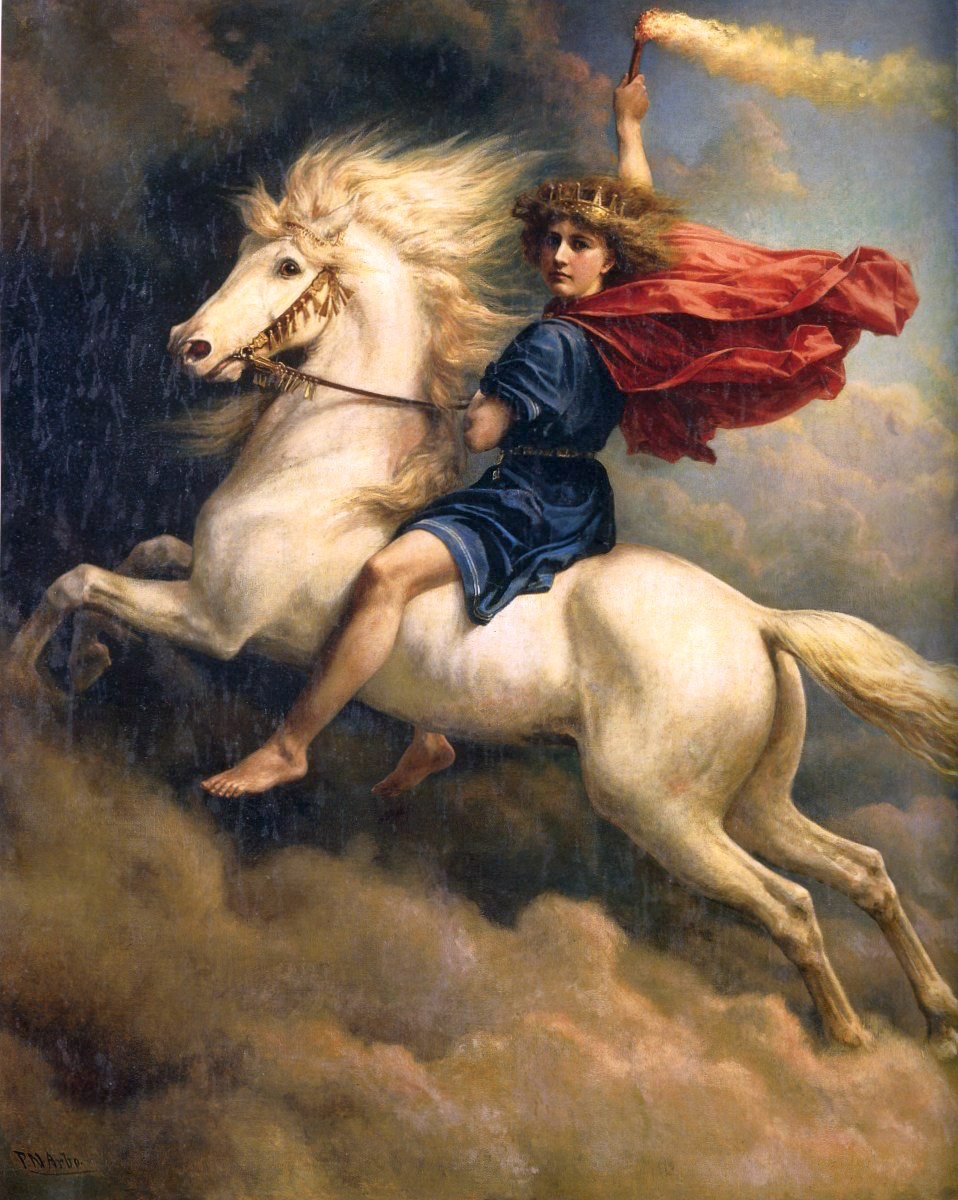
Dagr (1874)

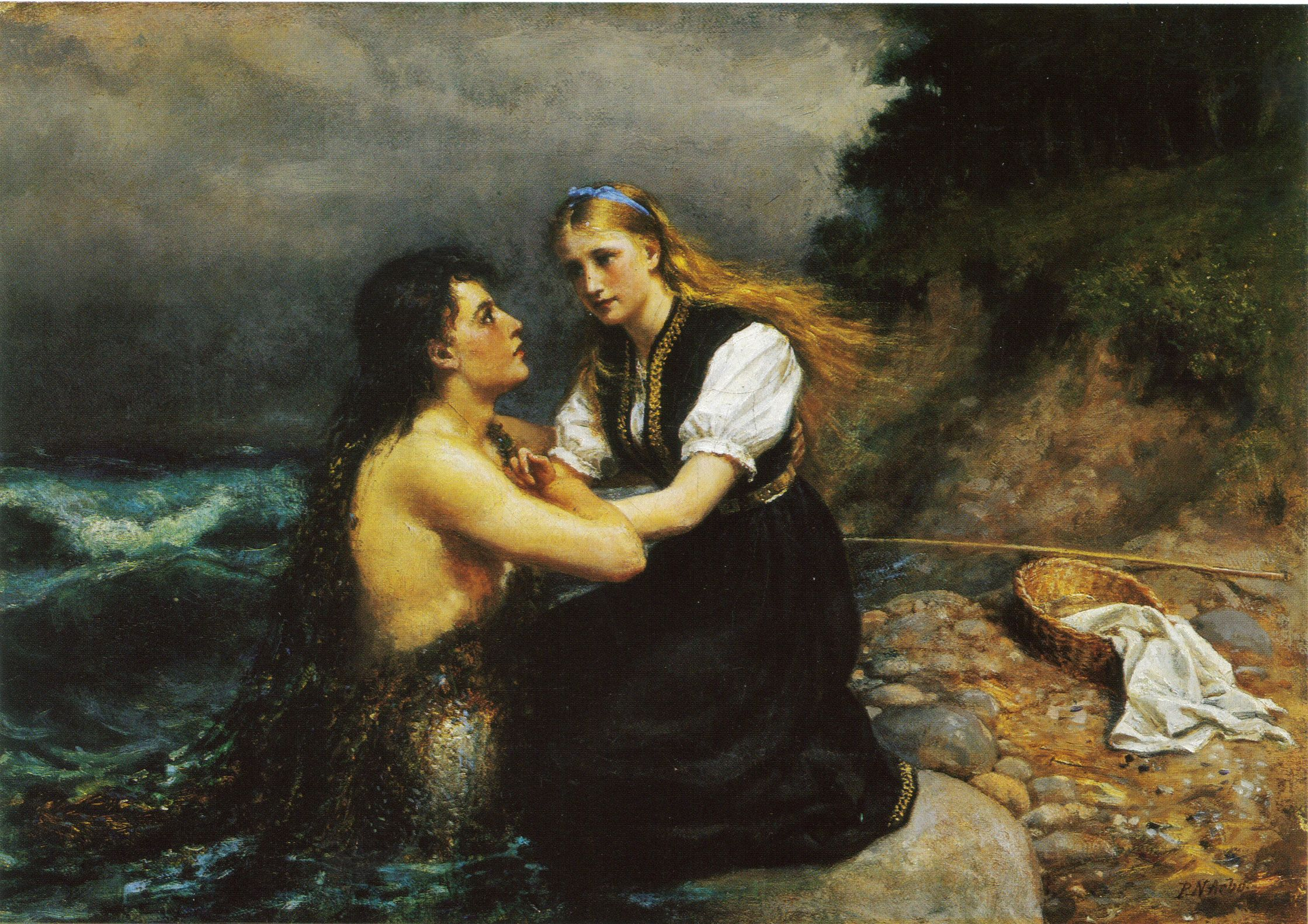
«Liden Gunver» og Havmanden (1874-1880)

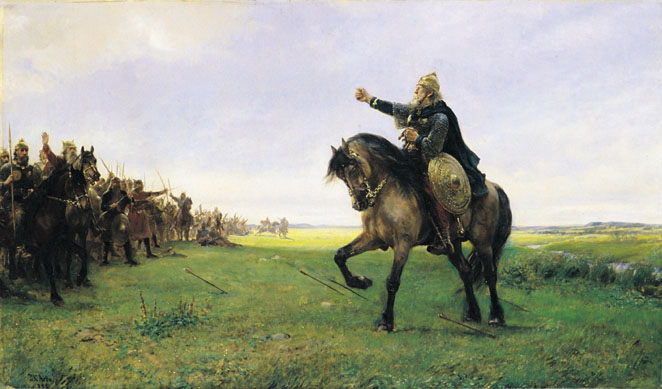
Gizur challenges the Huns (1886)

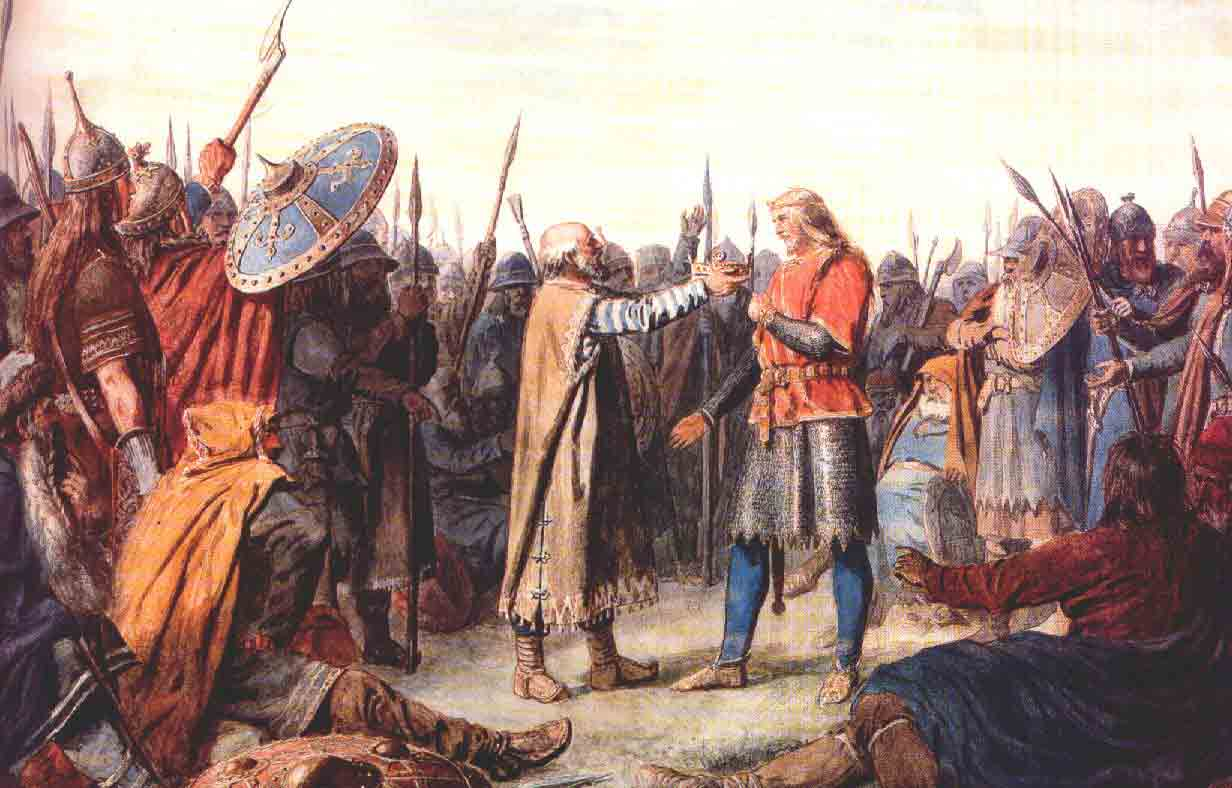
The Crowning of Olav I of Norway

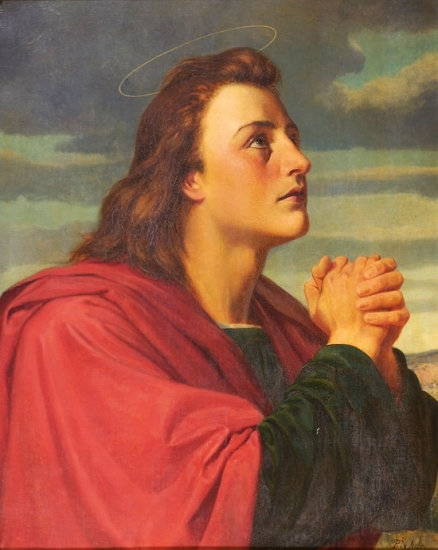
John the Apostle (1866)

== Sources ==
- Marit I. Lange and Anne Berit Skaug Peter Nicolai Arbo 1831-1892 (Museum of Drammen. Exhibition Catalogue; edited 1986)
- Leif Østby and Henning Alsvik, Norges billedkunst i det nittende og tyvende århundre (Vol. 1, pp. 167–8)
- Benezit Dictionary of Artists
