= James Fairbank =

Puerto Rican sailor (1925–2010)

Personal information
- Nationality: Puerto Rico
- Born: 18 December 1925 Puerto Rico
- Died: 16 December 2010 (Aged 84)
- Height: 1.93 m (6.3 ft)

Sailing career
- Sport: Sailing
- Class: Soling
- Updated on 27 February 2020

James Fairbank (18 December 1925 – 16 December 2010) was a sailor from Puerto Rico, who represented his country at the 1968 Summer Olympics in Acapulco, Mexico and the 1976 Summer Olympics in Kingston, Ontario, Canada as crew member in the Soling. With helmsman Juan R. Torruella and fellow crew member Lee Gentil they took the 22nd place.
