= Bill Solomons =

Australian sailor (1933–2016)

Personal information
- Full name: William Solomons
- Nationality: Australian
- Born: 11 February 1933
- Died: 11 September 2016 (aged 83); Sydney, Australia

Sport
- Sport: Sailing

William Solomons (11 February 1933 – 11 September 2016) was an Australian sailor. He competed in the 5.5 Metre event at the 1968 Summer Olympics. Solomons died in Sydney on 11 September 2016, at the age of 83.
