= Statue of Niels Juel =

Statue in Copenhagen by Theobald Stein

Coordinates: 55°40′40″N 12°35′10″E

Niels Juel
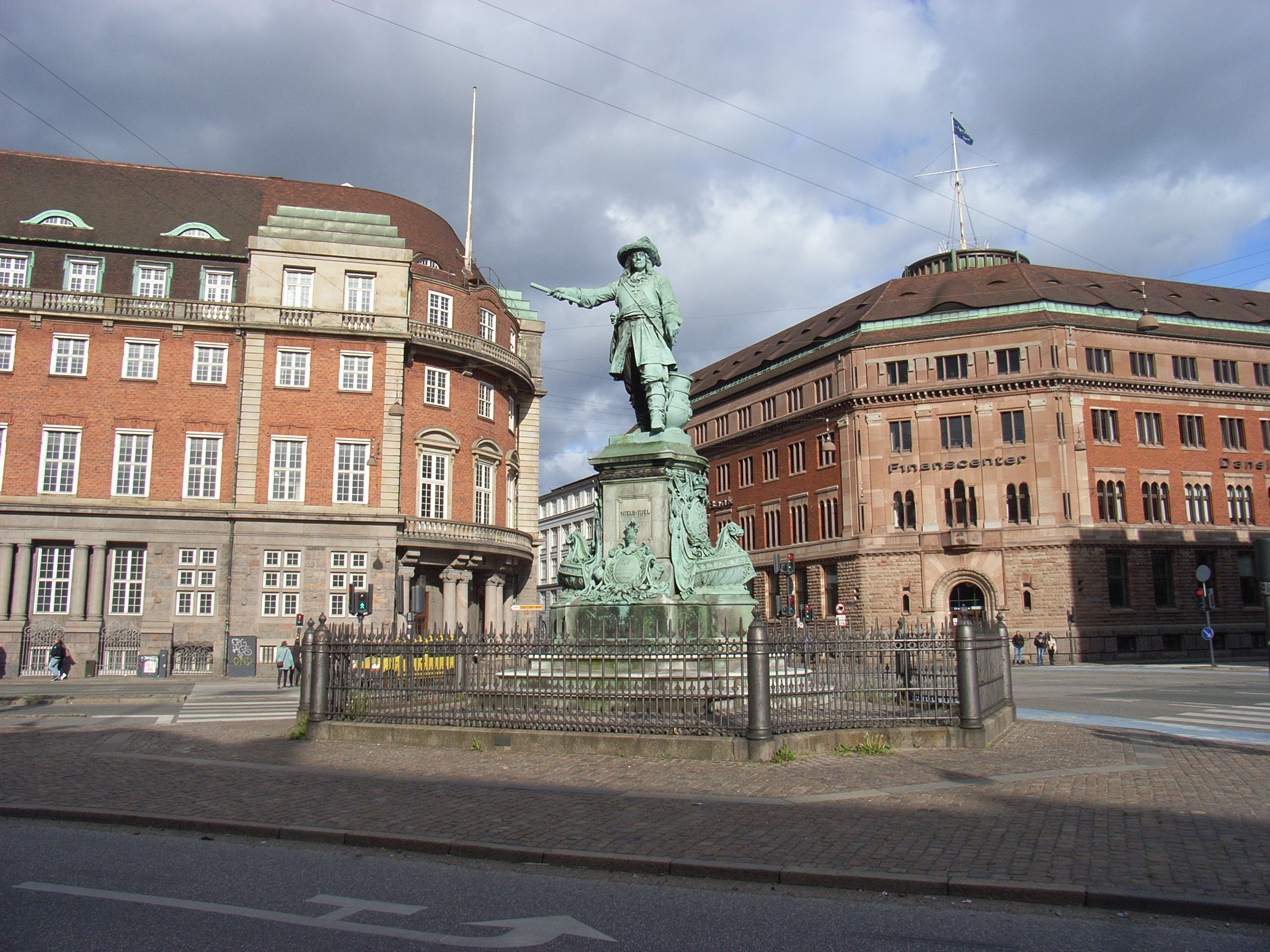
- The Niels Juel statue viewed with the old Hafnia headquarters as a backdrop
- Artist: Theobald Stein
- Year: 1873
- Medium: Bronze
- Subject: Niels Juel, Battle of Køge Bay
- Location: Copenhagen

The Statue of Niels Juel, created by the sculptor Theobald Stein, was unveiled in 1881 at Holmens Kanal in Copenhagen, Denmark. It stands next to Church of Holmen where he is buried and close to his former home in Kongens Nytorv. The monument with surroundings was listed in 2004.

== Description ==
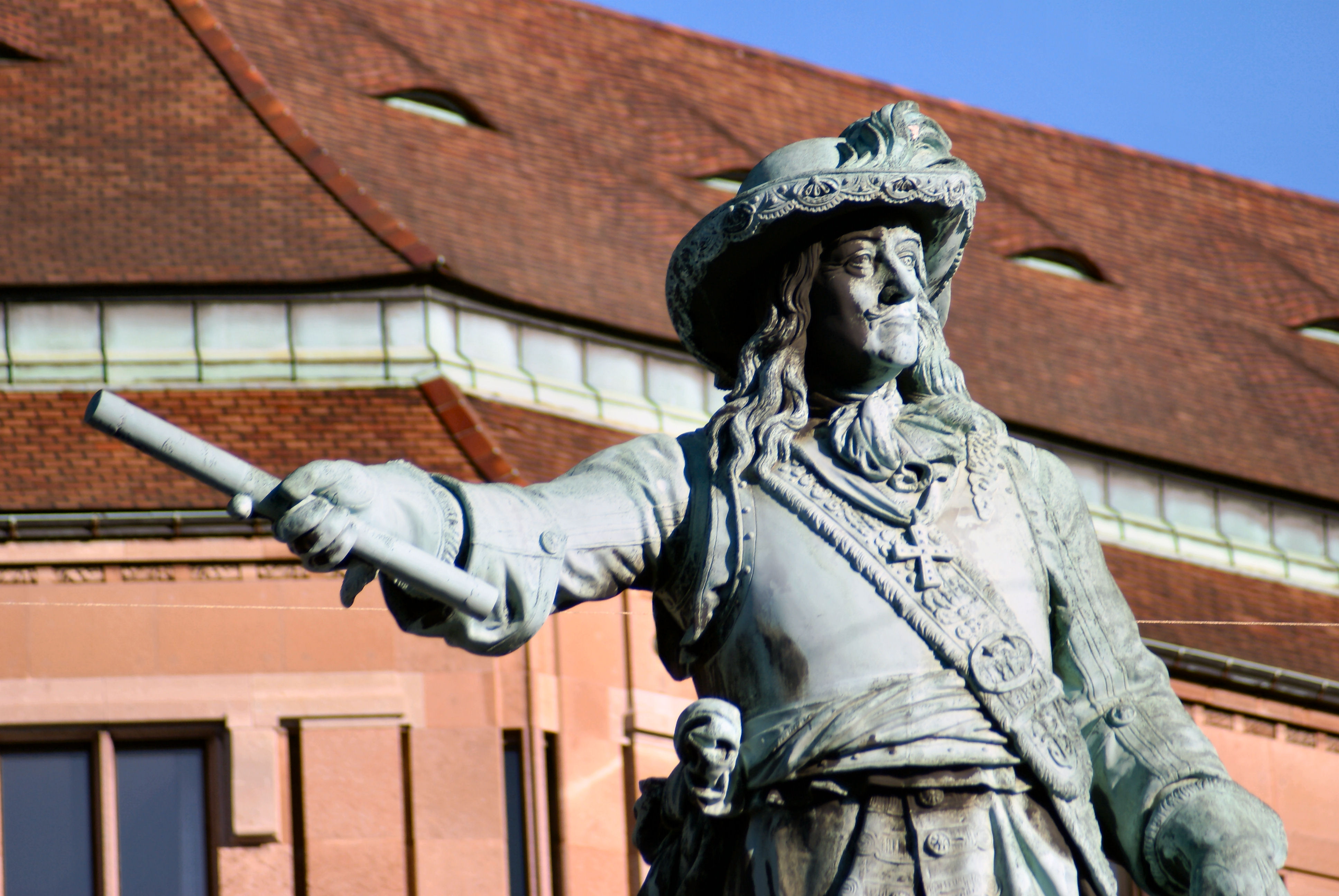
Detail

The monument is built to a pompous, Historicist design a full of symbols. It consists of a bronze statue placed on a high marble plinth with intricate bronze decorations. It is surrounded by paving of öland sandstone in a red-and-white pattern inside a low cast-iron fence. The monument depicts Admiral Niels Juel on board his ship Christianus Quintus, leaning against a mortar cannon and with his raised command rod signaling for the Battle of Køge Bay to begin.

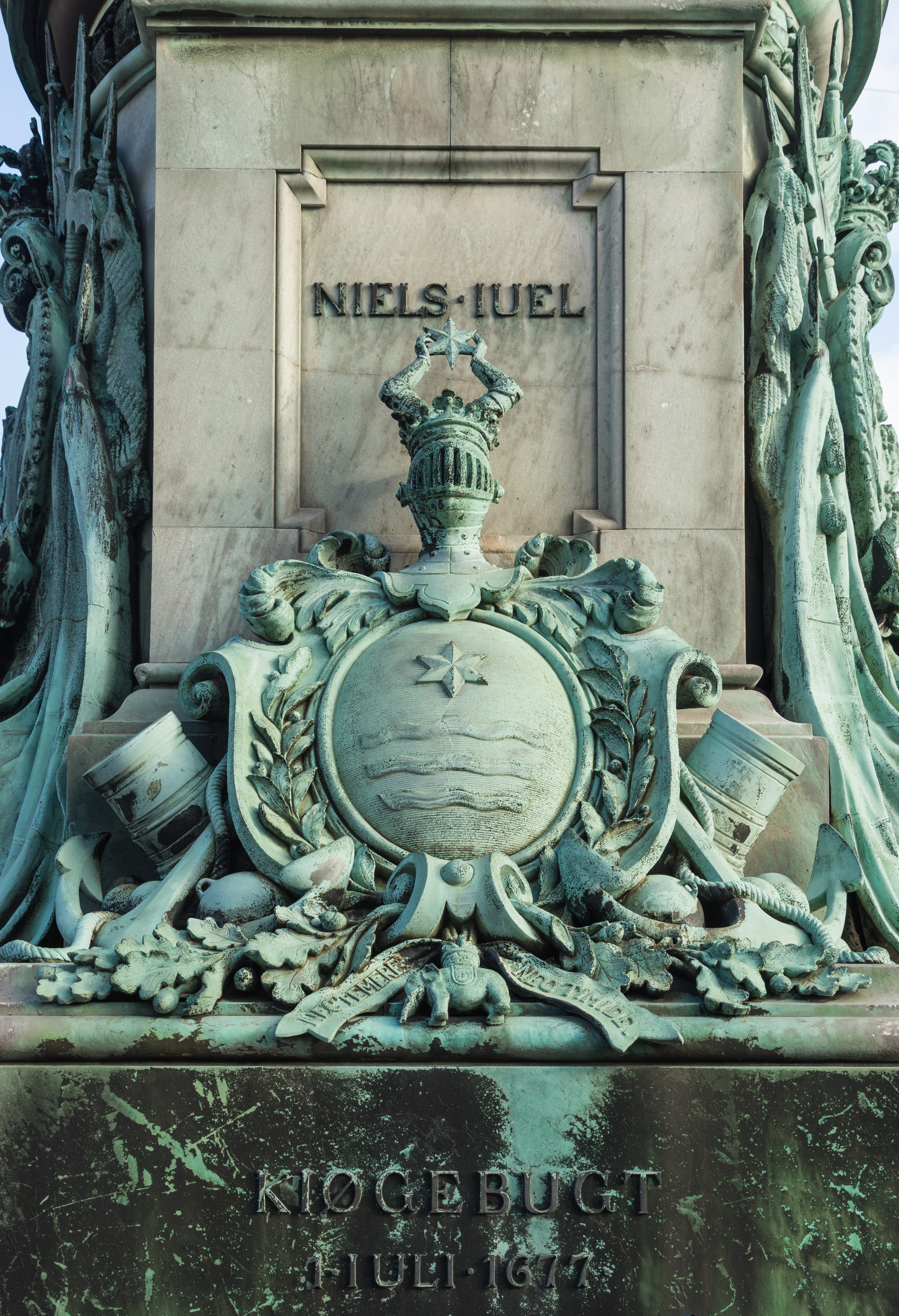
Detail of the plinth

The bronze decorations on the plinth comprises Niels Juel's coat of arms and the Order of the Elephant anchors, cannons and cannonballs. The bronze plaque with inscription is framed by maritime and military symbols. The inscription on the plaque reads"KÆMPERNES HARME/HAR DYBT BEGRAVET/ÆREN DOG STIGER/SOM SOL OVER HAVET".

Niels Juel's name is written on the upper front side of the plinth in bronze lettering and further down an inscription reads "Bay of Køge/1 July•1677" (Kjøge Bugt/1 juli•1677") in capitals. On the bronze decoration, close to the Order of the Elephant, an inscription reads "NEC TEMERE/NEC TIMIDE.". On the rostra on each side is the inscription "C 5", representing Christian V's monogram. On the lower right hand side of the plinth, an inscription rads "ØLAND/1•June•1676", a reference to the Battle of Öland. On the lower left hand side, an inscription in bronze lettering reads "GULLAND/1•MAY•1676". On the lower rear side is the inscription "MØEN/1•IUNI•1677".

== History ==
=== Origins ===
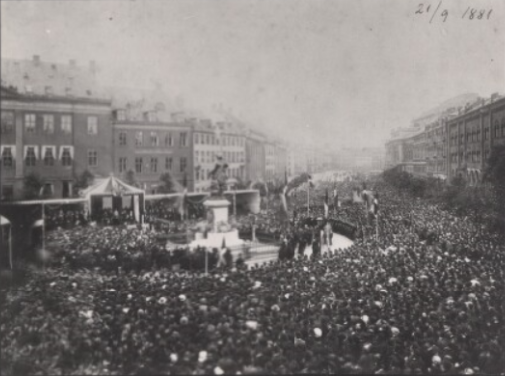
The inauguration of the monument in 1881

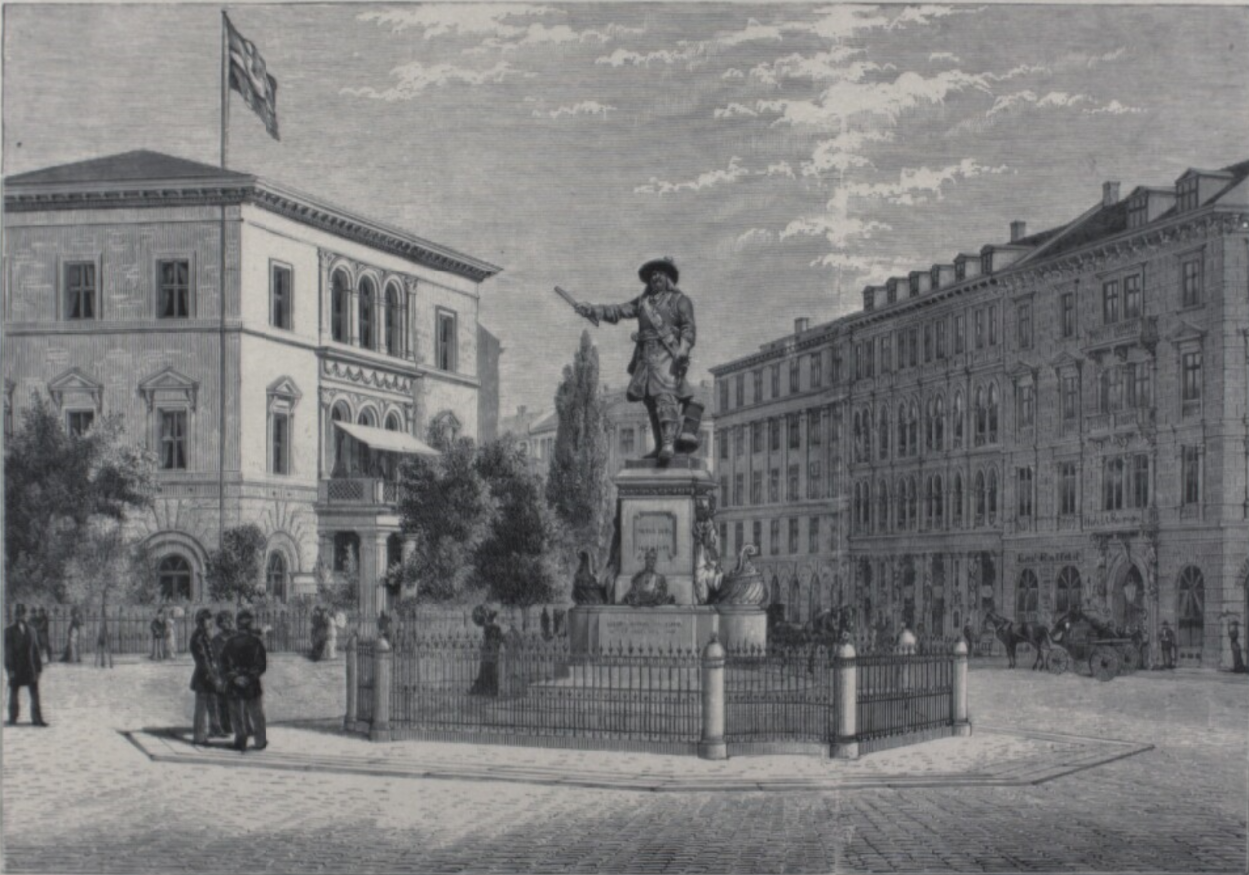
The Niels Juel statue with its surroundings

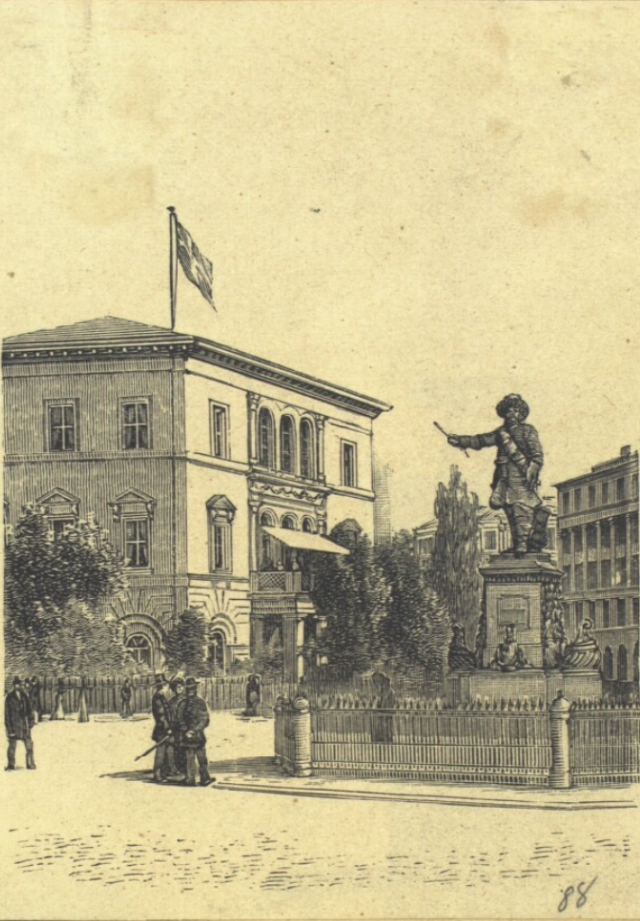
Drawing of the statue

The Royal Danish Dockyards were located at Gammelholm until the middle of the 19th century. The area was redeveloped into a residential neighbourhood in 1860-77 under supervision of city architect Ferdinand Meldahl. The Holmen Canal was filled in 1864.

The Niels Juel Monument was a gift from a committee in connection with the 200 years' anniversary of the Battle of Køge Bay on 1–2 July 1677. Niel Juel successfully led the Danish fleet through the battle against a larger Swedish fleet. The project received economic support from Det Eibeschützske Legat til Stadens Forskjønnelse and Niels Brocks Legat til Stadens almindelige Bedste.

Five artists, two of whom declined, were invited to participate in a competition for the design of the monument. Plaster models of the three proposals were installed in Charlottenborg and Theobald Stein won the competition with 19 votes while a proposal submitted by Vilhelm Bissen received three votes. Stein completed the statue in 1878 and the monument was unveiled on 21 September 1881. Installed in 1885, the two bronze street lights were a gift from Carlsberg-founder I.C. Jacobsen.

=== Changing surroundings ===
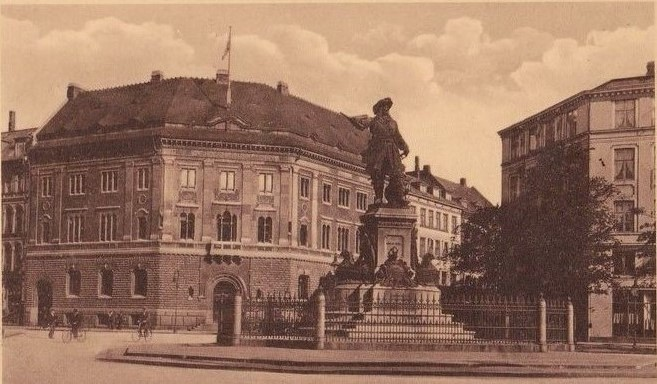
The Niels Juel statue with the original ØK Building as a backdrop

The immediate surroundings have changed considerably since its installation at the site. Of the surrounding buildings, the Peschier House is the only one that predates the Niels Juel statue. It is from 1798 but was expanded with an extra floor and 1850. The East Asiatic Company constructed a new headquarters in Jugendstil at the corner of Holbergsgade in 1907-09 but it was subject to Schalburgtage during World War II and replaced by a new building designed by Holger hacobsen in 1946–1949. The Hafnia insurance company constructed a new headquarters on the other side of Holbergsgade in 1910–12 to design by Ulrik Plesner. The youngest building at the site is the National Bank, built in 1965–78 to a Modernist design by Arne Jacobsen. The traffic lanes have also been expanded. Holmens Kanal is part of the Ring 2 ring road.

In a meeting on 15 January 2003, Copenhagen Municipality decided to move the monument to a new location on the waterfront. It was listed by the Danish Building Protection Authority in 2004.

== Other versions ==
A painted plaster statuette is owned by the Holmen Naval Base but on loan at the Royal Danish Naval Museum (now merged with the Royal Danish Arsenal Museum). The Hirschsprung Collection owns two terracotta statuettes and two plaster statuettes.

== See also ==
- List of public art in Copenhagen
