= Lee Gentil =

Puerto Rican sailor (1934–2022)

Personal information
- Nationality: Puerto Rico
- Born: 22 December 1934; Port Arthur, Texas, U.S.
- Died: 17 February 2022 (aged 87); Florida, U.S.
- Height: 1.75 m (5.7 ft)

Sailing career
- Class(es): Finn, Soling, 5.5 Metre
- Updated on 27 February 2020

Lee Roy Gentil (25 December 1934 – 17 February 2022) was a sailor from Puerto Rico, who represented his country at the 1968 Summer Olympics in Acapulco, Mexico, the 1972 Summer Olympics in Kiel, Germany and the 1976 Summer Olympics in Kingston, Ontario, Canada as crew member in the Soling. With helmsman Juan R. Torruella and fellow crew member James Fairbank, they took the 22nd place. Gentil died in Florida on 17 February 2022, at the age of 87.

== Sources ==
- "Lee Gentil Bio, Stats, and Results". Olympic Sports. Sports-Reference.com. Archived from the original on 12 November 2012.
