= Christian Hansen (sailor) =

Danish sailor

Personal information
- Nationality: Danish
- Born: 3 January 1944 (age 81); Copenhagen, Denmark

Sport
- Sport: Sailing

Christian Hansen (born 3 January 1944) is a Danish sailor. He competed in the 5.5 Metre event at the 1968 Summer Olympics.
