= Gilbert Kaufman =

Australian sailor

Personal information
- Nationality: Australian
- Born: 30 April 1948 (age 76)

Sport
- Sport: Sailing

Gilbert Kaufman (born 30 April 1948) is an Australian sailor. He competed in the 5.5 Metre event at the 1968 Summer Olympics.
