= Little Gunver =

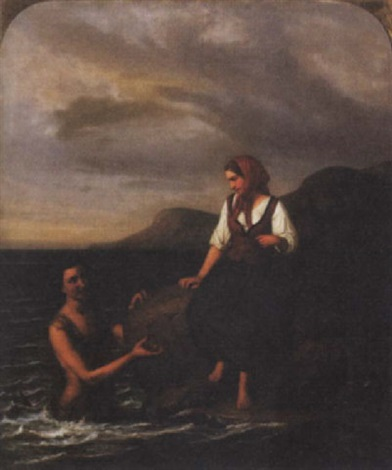
Edvard Lehmann: Little Gunver and the Merman

Little Gunver (Danish: Liden Gunver) is a song and fictional character in Johannes Ewald and Johann Hartmann's singspiel The Fishermen (Fiskerne) which premiered at the Royal Danish Theatre in Copenhagen in 1780. It is also the name of a bronze sculpture by Theobald Stein in Rosenborg Castle Garden.

The Fishermen was partly inspired by true events which had taken place a few years earlier. A group of fishermen from Hornbæk saved the crew from a wrecked British ship and later refused to receive the customary reward. Instead a nobleman granted them an annual amount for the rest of their lives.

== Song ==
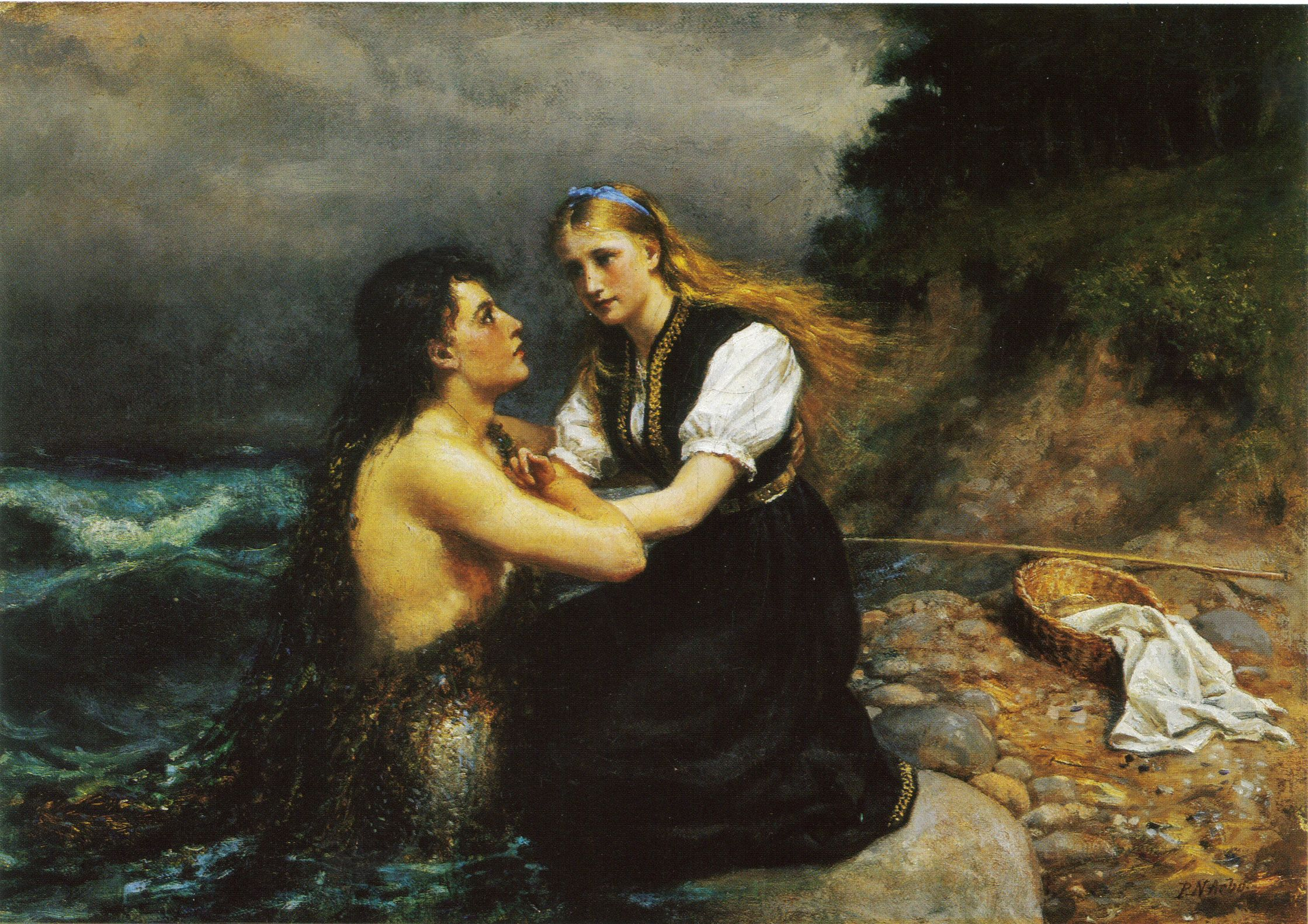
Peter Nicolai Arbo: Little Gunver and the Merman, 1874-1880

The song about Little Gunver is about a young girl who is drawn to the bottom of the sea by an alluring but deceitful merman. The song is song by one of the eponymous fishermen to show their superstition. The song is a pastiche written in the style of a traditional medieval ballade (folkevise). It is based on Nøkkens svig which is included in Peder Syv's collection of songs from 1695. Ewald's song gained great popularity, also outside the theatre.

== Sculpture ==
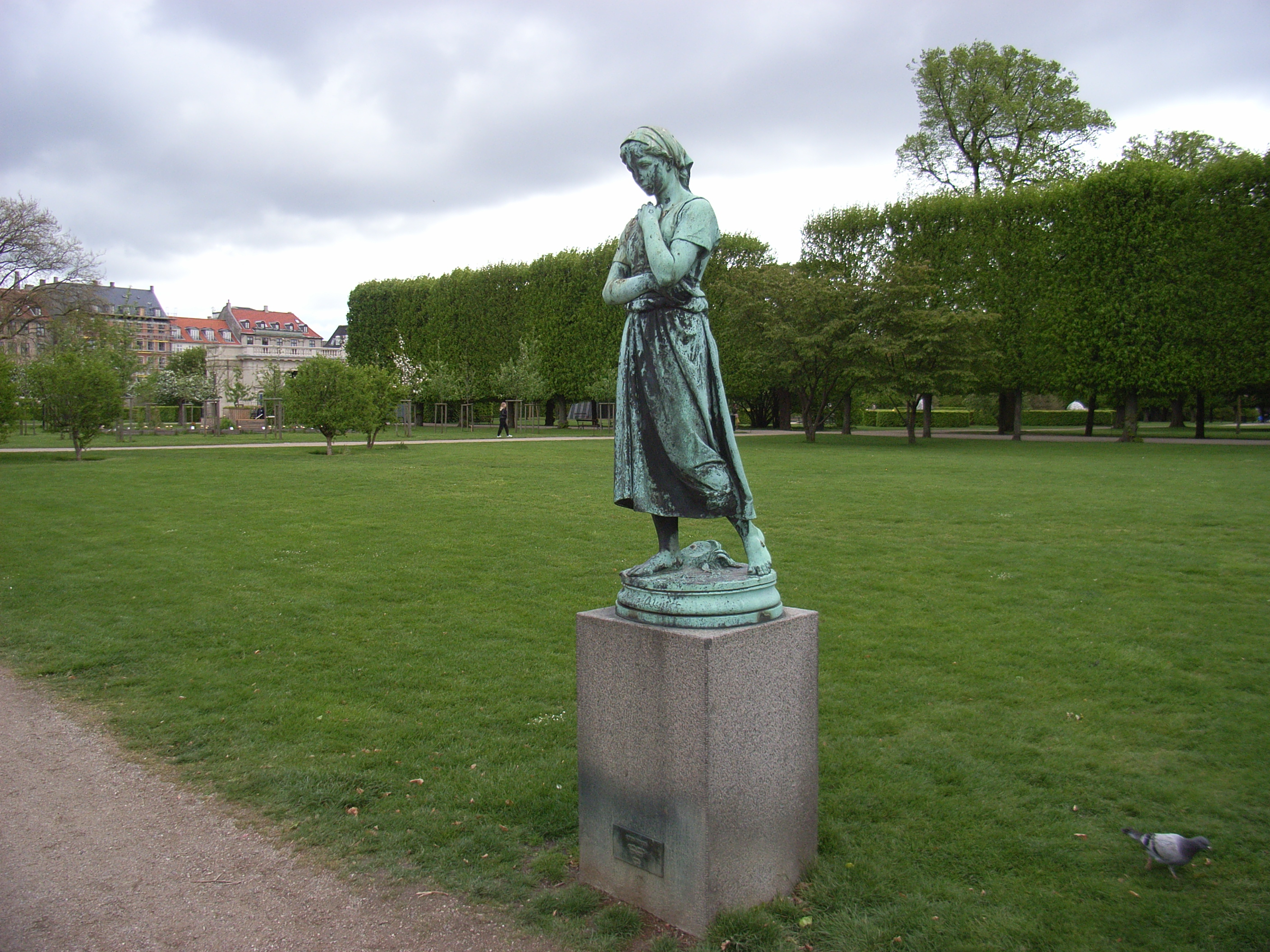
Theovald Stein's sculpture in Rosenborg Castle Garden in Copenhagen

Danish sculptor Theobald Stein created a sculpture of Little Gunver in 1899. The song had recently experienced a revival after being included in the first volume of Danmarks Melodibog. A bronze cast was installed on a temporary basis in Rosenborg Castle Garden in Copenhagen in 1909 but was made permanent through a donation from Carl Jacobsen in 1911. It depicts Little Gunver walking about with a dreamy and somewhat melancholic expression. It illustrates the lines:

Liden Gunver vandrer som helst i Qvel,
Saa tankefuld.
Hendes Hjerte var Vox, hendes unge Siel
var prøvet Guld.
O vogt dig, mit Barn, for de falske Mandfolk!
