= Adrian Jardine =

British sailor (born 1933)

Medal record

Sailing

Representing Great Britain

Olympic Games
Bronze medal – third place	1968 Mexico City	5.5m class

Adrian Jardine (born 23 August 1933) is a British sailor. He won a bronze medal in the 5.5 Metre class at the 1968 Summer Olympics together with Robin Aisher and Paul Anderson.

Jardine is the twin brother of Stuart Jardine and attended Millfield School (1945–1952).
