= Louis Noverraz =

Swiss sailor

Personal information
- Born: 10 May 1902 Cully-Lutry, Vaud, Switzerland
- Died: 15 May 1972 (aged 70) Geneva, Switzerland
Medal record
Sailing
Representing Switzerland
Olympic Games
Silver medal – second place	1968 Mexico City	5.5m class
World Championships
Gold medal – first place	1961 Helsinki	5.5m

Louis Noverraz (10 May 1902 – 15 May 1972) was a Swiss competitive sailor and Olympic medalist. He won a silver medal in the 5.5 Metre class at the 1968 Summer Olympics in Mexico City, together with Bernard Dunand and Marcel Stern.

He sailed on France at the 1970 America's Cup.
