= Robin Aisher =

British sailor (1934–2023)

Robin Aisher OBE
Personal information
- Born: 24 January 1934
- Died: 26 June 2023 (aged 89)
Medal record
Sailing
Representing Great Britain
Olympic Games
Bronze medal – third place	1968 Mexico City	5.5m class
World Championships
Silver medal – second place	1967 Nassau	5.5m
Bronze medal – third place	1966 Copenhagen	5.5m

Robin Allingham Aisher OBE (24 January 1934 – 26 June 2023) was a British sailor. He won a bronze medal in the 5.5 Metre class at the 1968 Summer Olympics together with Adrian Jardine and Paul Anderson.

A long-time member of the Royal Thames Yacht Club, he served as the club's Vice-Commodore in the period 1977–1980. He was appointed an Officer of the Order of the British Empire in the 1986 Birthday Honours.

Aisher died on 26 June 2023, at the age of 89.
