= Bernard Dunand =

Swiss sailor

Personal information
- Born: 2 September 1936 (age 89) Geneva, Switzerland
Medal record
Sailing
Representing Switzerland
Olympic Games
Silver medal – second place	1968 Mexico City	5.5m class

Bernard Dunand (born 2 September 1936) is a Swiss competitive sailor and Olympic medalist. He won a silver medal in the 5.5 Metre class at the 1968 Summer Olympics in Mexico City, together with Marcel Stern and Louis Noverraz.

He sailed on France at the 1970 America's Cup.
