= Giuseppe Zucchinetti =

Italian sailor

Giuseppe Zucchinetti (20 November 1924 – 15 May 2009) was an Italian sailor who competed in the 1968 Summer Olympics.
