= Paul Anderson (sailor) =

British sailor (1935–2022)

Paul Richard Anderson OBE
Personal information
- Born: 26 February 1935
- Died: 7 March 2022 (aged 87)
Medal record
Sailing
Representing Great Britain
Olympic Games
Bronze medal – third place	1968 Mexico City	5.5m class

Paul Richard Anderson OBE (26 February 1935 – 7 March 2022) was a British sailor and bronze medallist. He won a bronze medal in the 5.5 Metre class at the 1968 Summer Olympics together with Robin Aisher and Adrian Jardine.

Anderson was appointed Officer of the Order of the British Empire (OBE) in the 2011 Birthday Honours for services to Special Olympics Great Britain. He died on 7 March 2022, at the age of 87.
