= Vladimir Aleksandrov (sailor) =

Soviet sailor

Personal information
- Nationality: Soviet
- Born: 8 January 1945 (age 80); Moscow, Russia
- Height: 172 cm (5 ft 8 in)
- Weight: 70 kg (154 lb)

Sport
- Sport: Sailing

Vladimir Aleksandrov (born 8 January 1945) is a Soviet sailor. He competed in the 5.5 Metre event at the 1968 Summer Olympics.
