= Marcel Stern =

Swiss sailor

Personal information
- Nationality: Swiss
- Born: 9 January 1922 Genoa, Italy
- Died: 16 April 2002 (aged 80)
Medal record
Sailing
Representing Switzerland
Olympic Games
Silver medal – second place	1968 Mexico City	5.5m class

Marcel Stern (9 January 1922 – 16 April 2002) was a Swiss competitive sailor and Olympic medalist. He won a silver medal in the 5.5 Metre class at the 1968 Summer Olympics in Mexico City, together with Bernard Dunand and Louis Noverraz.
