= Harald Stein =

German sailor (born 1942)

Harald Stein (born 4 August 1942) is a German former sailor who competed in the 1968 Summer Olympics.

Since 1970, Stein is physician and works as a pathologist in Berlin.
