= Margit Hvammen =

Norwegian alpine skier (1932–2010)

Personal information
- Nationality: Norwegian
- Born: 26 September 1932; Geilo, Norway
- Died: 10 May 2010 (aged 77)

Sport
- Sport: Alpine skiing
- Club: Geilo IL

Margit Hvammen (26 September 1932 – 10 May 2010) was a Norwegian alpine skier.

== Career ==
Hvammen competed at the 1952 Winter Olympics in Oslo, where she placed 7th in the downhill, 18th in giant slalom, and 18th in slalom. She represented the club Geilo IL.

== Personal life ==
Hvammen was born in Geilo. She was a sister of Aud Hvammen, a sister-in-law of Peder Lunde Jr., and aunt of Jeanette Lunde. She died on 10 May 2010.
