= Gjeilo =

Gjeilo may refer to:

- Ola Gjeilo (born 1978), Norwegian composer and pianist in the United States
- Gjeilo, a farm after which the ski resort of Geilo, Norway, is named
  - Geilo IL, formerly Gjeilo SK, a multi-sports club from Geilo, Norway
