= Arne E. Holm =

Architect and artist

Arne Ellerhusen Holm (11 June 1911 – 31 January 2009) was a Norwegian painter, graphic artist and architect.

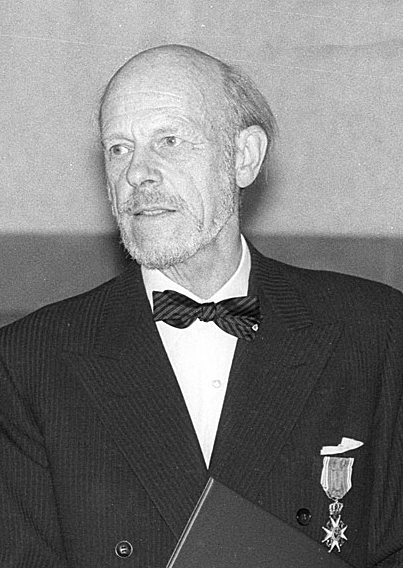
Arne E. Holm (1979)

== Biography ==
He was born in Bergen as a son of banker Arne Holm (1880–1975) and Anne Sophie Wibye Ellerhusen (1880–1920). He was a grandson of physician and health pioneer Ingebrigt Christian Holm (1844-1918), founder of Dr. Holms Hotel in Geilo.

He grew up in Bergen until the age of seven, then in Kristiania for a few years and finally Trondheim. He enrolled in architect studies at Norwegian Institute of Technology in Trondheim. He took one year off at the Norwegian National Academy of Fine Arts, studying under Axel Revold and Jean Heiberg from 1934 to 1935, but returned to finish his architect's degree in 1937. He followed with one additional year at the National Academy of Fine Arts, now under Georg Jacobsen. In 1938 he married Else Hagen. He was a teacher at the Norwegian National Academy of Craft and Art Industry from 1938, but in 1947 he was appointed as a professor at the Norwegian Institute of Technology. He remained here until his retirement in 1978.

He made his exhibition debut as a painter in 1942, and the painting Juninatt (1945) was bought by the National Gallery of Norway in 1946. He is also known for designing several stamps in the 1960s, for his altarpiece at Herøya Church as well as decorating corporate headquarters. He served as vice chairman, later chairman of Trondhjems Kunstforening between 1955 and 1971.

He was decorated as a Knight, First Class of the Order of St. Olav in 1978 and was awarded the Gunnerus Medal in 1989. Himself a numismatist, he donated his coin collection to the Royal Norwegian Society of Sciences and Letters museum. He died in January 2009 in Oslo, where he lived after retiring.
