= Hvammen =

Hvammen is a surname. Notable people with the surname include:

- Aud Hvammen (born 1943), Norwegian alpine skier
- Espen Aarnes Hvammen (born 1988), Norwegian speed skater
- Margit Hvammen (1932–2010), Norwegian alpine skier
