= Aud Hvammen =

Norwegian alpine skier (born 1943)

Margit Hvammen
Personal information
- Nationality: Norwegian
- Born: 31 May 1943 (age 81); Geilo, Norway
- Spouse: Peder Lunde Jr.

Sport
- Sport: Alpine skiing
- Club: Geilo IL

Aud Hvammen (born 31 May 1943) is a Norwegian alpine skier. She was born in Geilo, and is the sister of Margit Hvammen. She is married to Peder Lunde, and mother of Jeanette Lunde. She participated at the 1968 Winter Olympics in Grenoble, where she competed in slalom and giant slalom.

She became Norwegian champion in slalom in 1964, in giant slalom in 1965, 1967 and 1968, and in alpine combined in 1964.
