= Ustaoset Station =

Railway station in Ustaoset, Hol, Norway

Coordinates: 60°29′46.98″N 8°2′41.68″E

Ustaoset
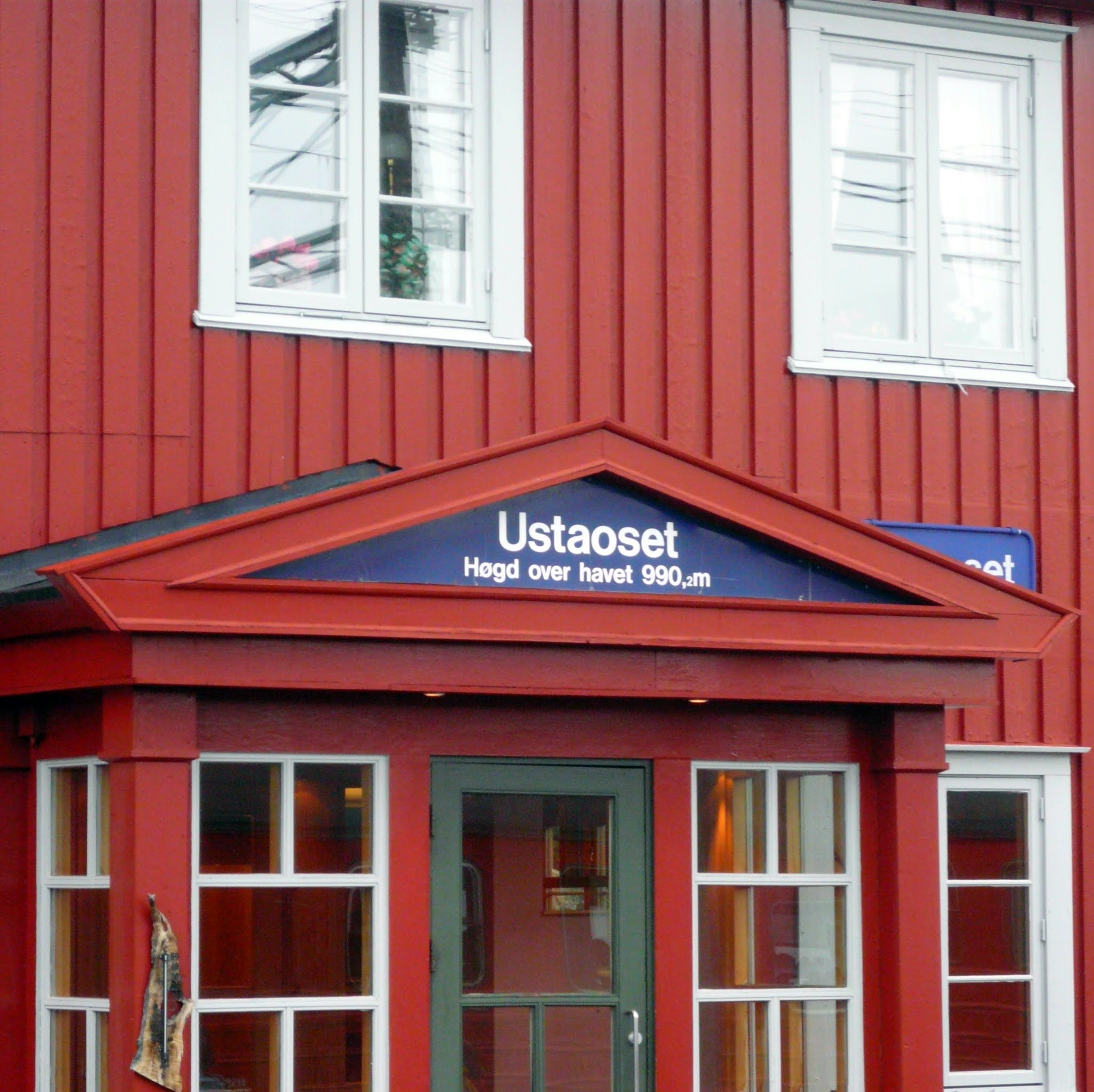
- Ustaoset

General information
- Location: Ustaoset, Hol; Norway
- Elevation: 990.6 m (3,250 ft)
- Owner: Bane NOR
- Operator: Vy Tog
- Line: Bergensbanen
- Distance: 264.67 kilometres (164.46 mi)

History
- Opened: 1912
Location

Ustaoset Station (Norwegian: Ustaoset stasjon) is a railway station located at Ustaoset in Hol, Norway. The station is served by up to seven daily express trains operated by Vy Tog. The station was opened in 1912 when cabin building started in the area. Ustaoset is primarily a recreational area, with 900 cabins.

== Other sources ==
- Nils Carl Aspenberg (1999) Fra Roa til Bergen. Historien om Bergensbanen (Oslo: Baneforlaget) ISBN 8291448280

Preceding station			Following station
Haugastøl	Bergensbanen		Geilo
Preceding station	Express trains		Following station
Haugastøl	F4	Bergen–Oslo S	Geilo
