= Geilo Station =

Railway station in Hol, Norway

Coordinates: 60°32′5.07″N 8°12′23.81″E

Geilo
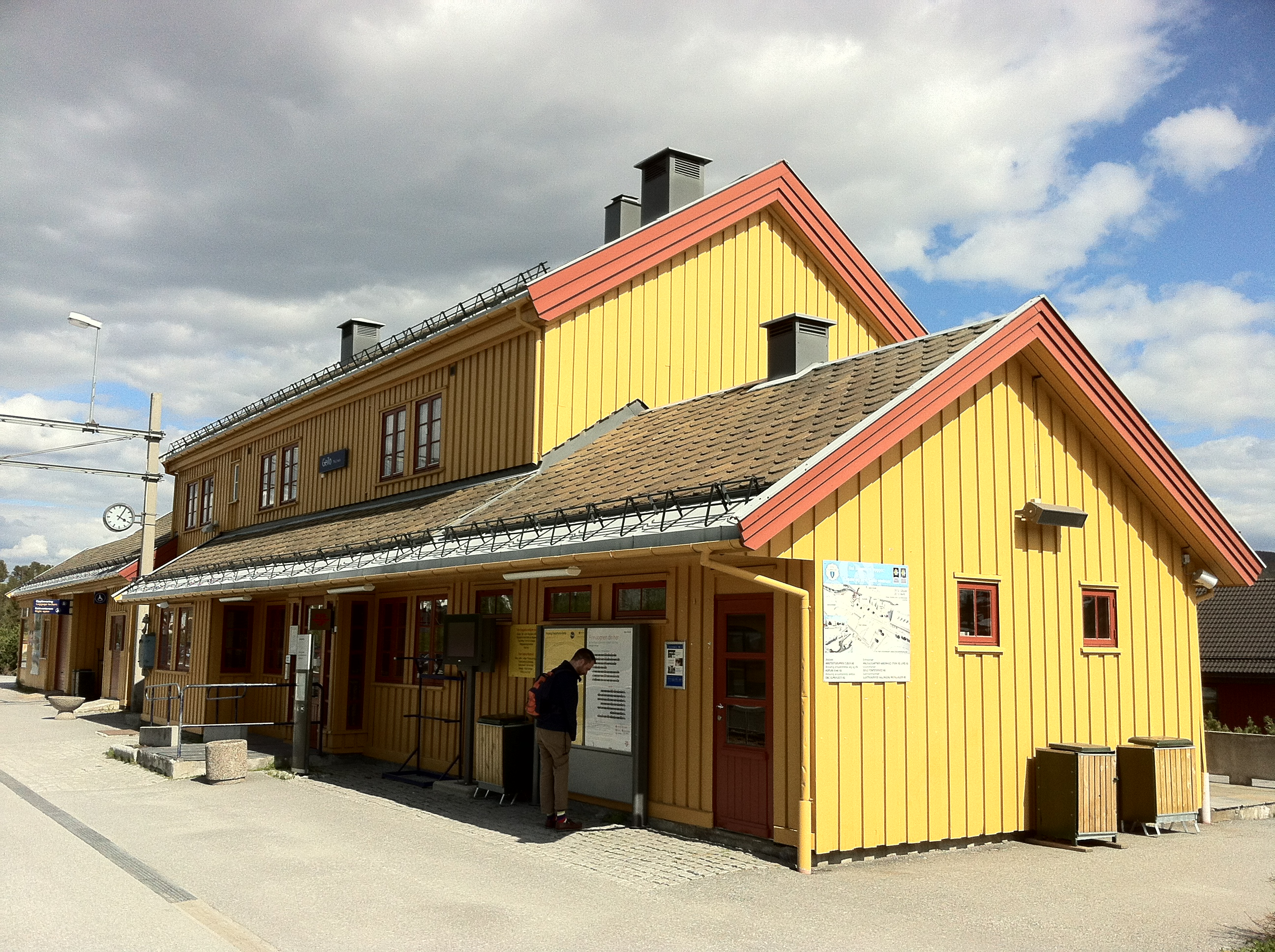

General information
- Location: Geilo, Hol; Norway
- Elevation: 794.2 m (2,606 ft)
- Owner: Bane NOR
- Operator: Vy Tog
- Line: Bergen Line
- Distance: 228.21 km
- Connections: Bus: Numedal, Odda, Hardanger

Construction
- Architect: Paul Due

History
- Opened: 1907
Location

Geilo Station (Norwegian: Geilo stasjon) is a railway station located at Geilo, Norway. The station is served by up to seven daily express trains operated by Vy Tog.

== History ==
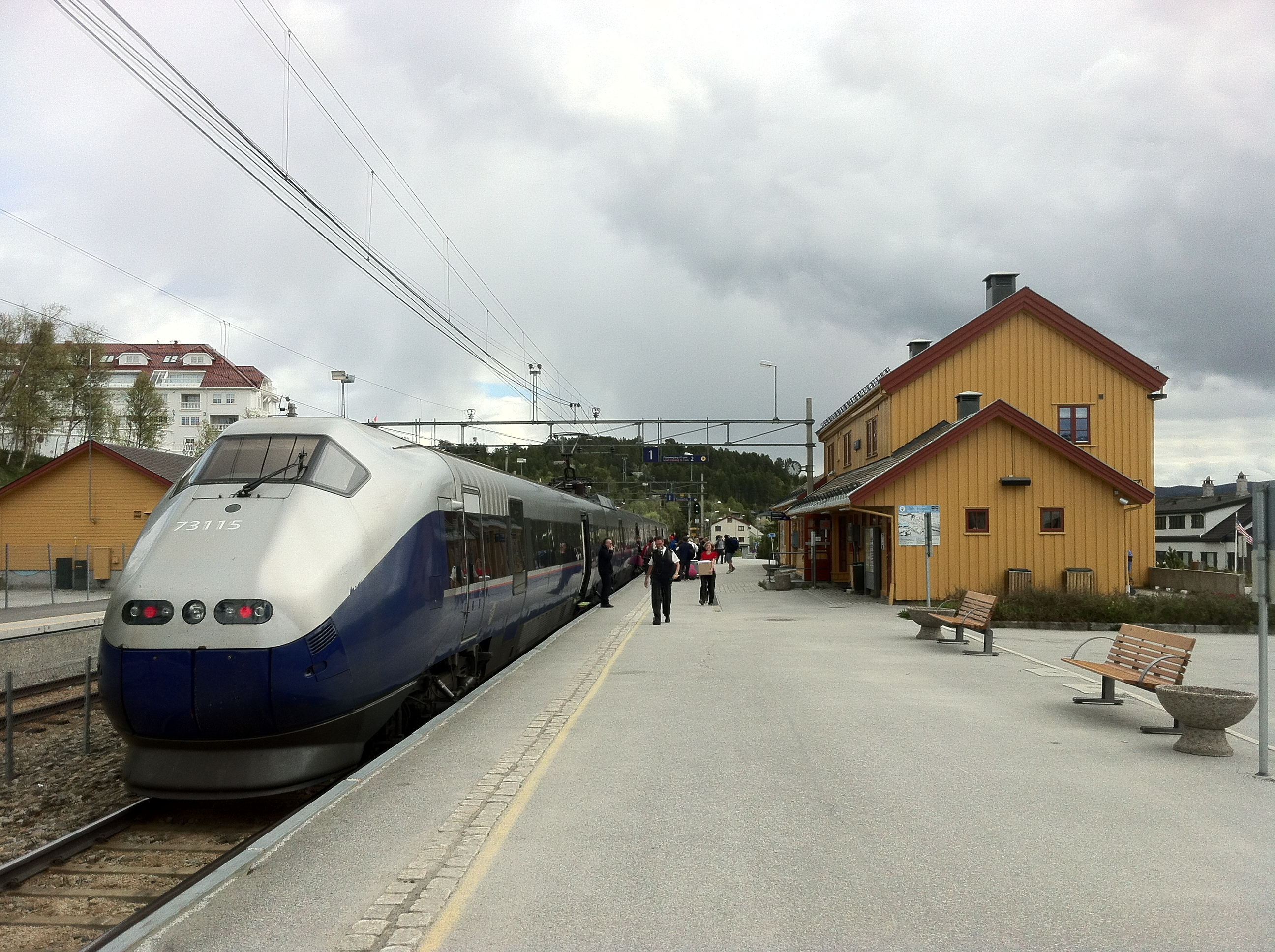
A Class 73 unit at Geilo Station

The station was opened as part of the Bergen Line between Bergen and Gulsvik in 1907.

Preceding station			Following station
Ustaoset	Bergen Line		Ål
Preceding station	Express trains		Following station
Ustaoset	F4	Bergen–Oslo S	Ål
