= Joachim Havikhagen =

Norwegian snowboarder (born 1991)

Personal information
- Born: 5 September 1981 (age 43); Gol, Norway

Sport
- Sport: Snowboarding
- Club: Geilo IL

Joachim Havikhagen (born 5 September 1991) is a Norwegian snowboarder who competes for Geilo IL. He represented Norway at the 2010 Winter Olympics in Vancouver.
