= Else Hagen =

Norwegian visual artist (1914–2010)

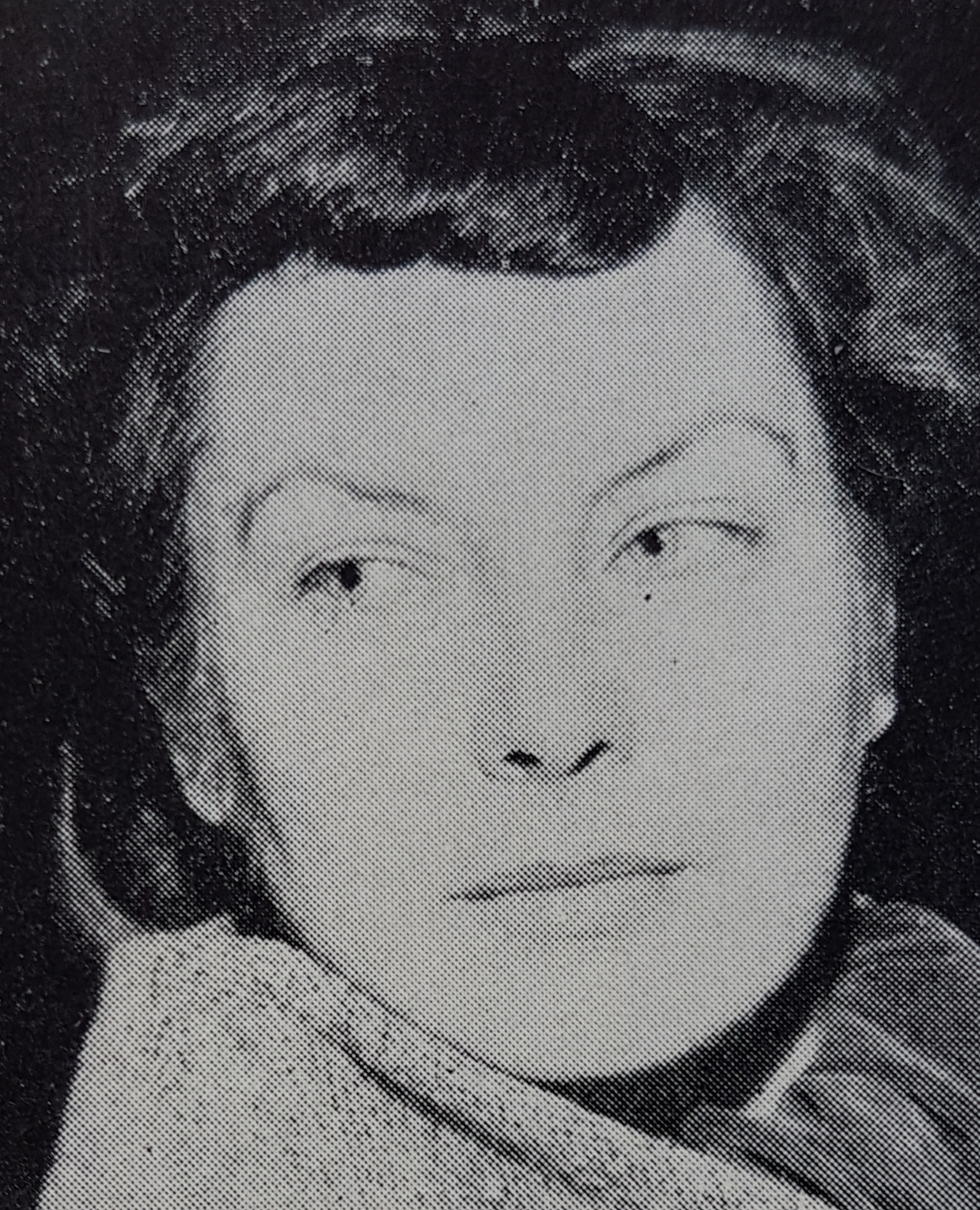
- Born: 21 September 1914; Eydehavn, Norway
- Died: 17 August 2010 (aged 95); Oslo
- Occupation: Visual artist
- Spouse: Arne E. Holm

Else Hagen (21 September 1914 – 17 August 2010) was a Norwegian visual artist.

== Life and career ==
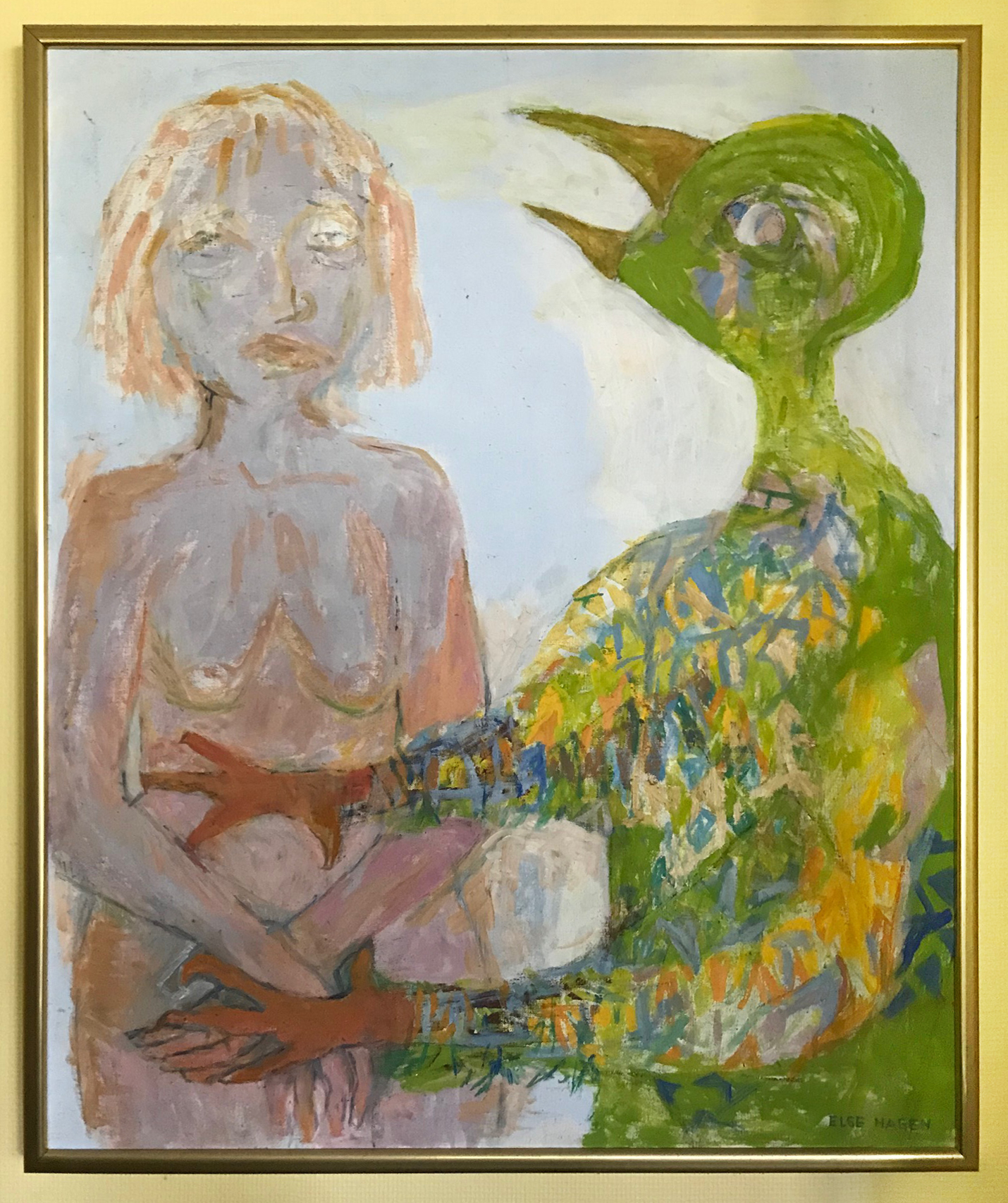
Oil painting by Hagen

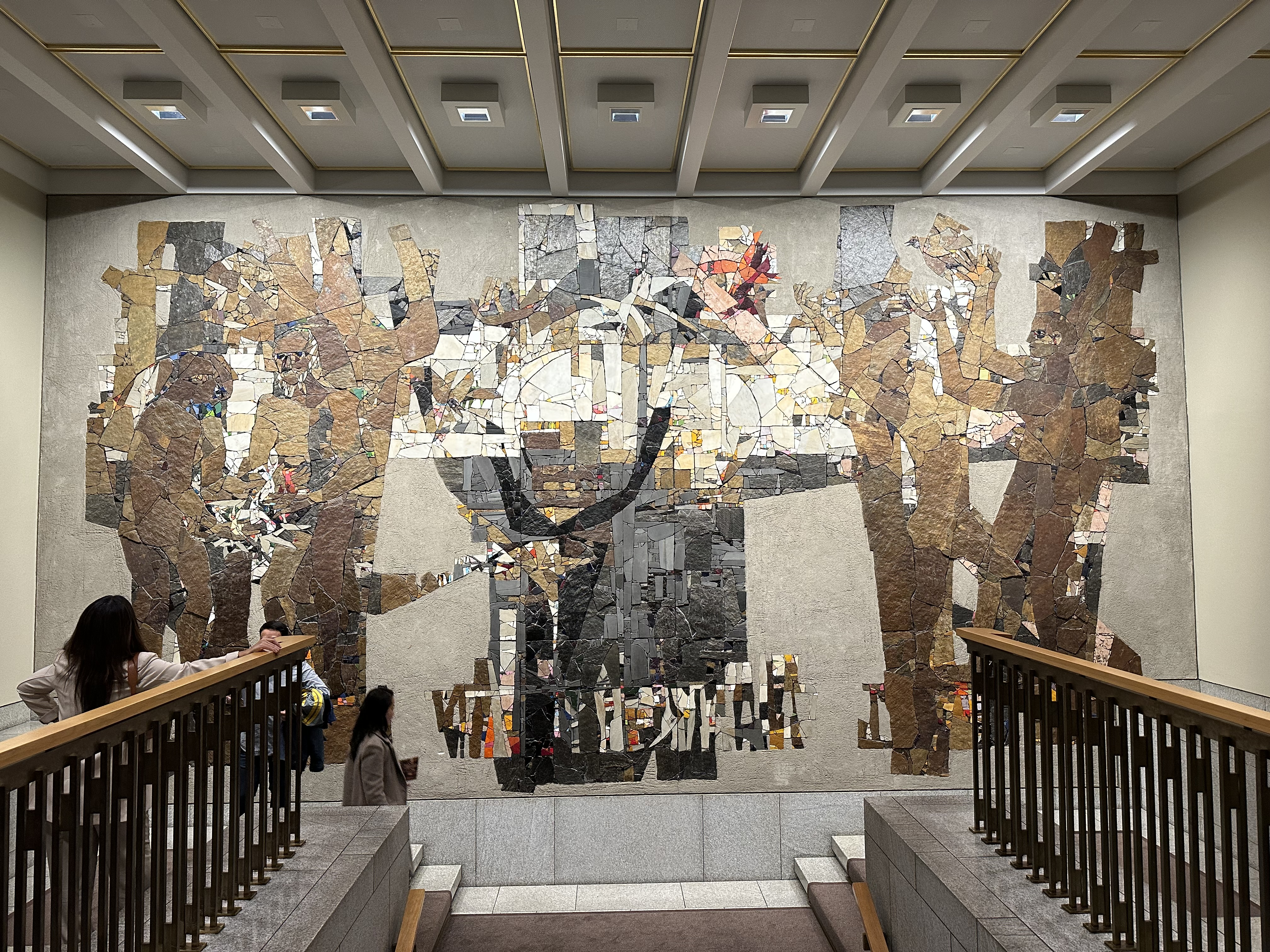
Metal relief wall decorations from the Storting building

Born in Eydehavn on 21 September 1914, Hagen was married to Arne E. Holm. She is known for her large decorations in public areas. Among her works are decorations in Stortinget, Tromsø Airport, the University Library in Bergen, the Norwegian School of Sport Sciences, and Postgirobygget.

When she won the competition to decorate Nøtterøy Realskole (now Borgheim School) in 1950, she became the first female artist to receive a public decoration commission in Norway.

She is represented at the National Museum of Norway with the paintings Perleporten (1950s), Hemmeligheter (1953), Hårvask (1954), Sydfransk natt (1954) Prestekrave (1957), Kastevind (1974), Masker (c.1981), and Bundet (1989), in addition to prints and drawings.

The ambulating exhibition Else Hagen: Mellom mennesker was shown in Oslo, Trondheim, Stavanger and Kristiansand during 2024 and 2025, a collaboration between the National Museum, Kunstsilo, and art museums in Stavanger and Trondheim.

Hagen died in Oslo on 17 August 2010, at the age of 95.
