= Ustaoset =

Village in Hol, Buskerud, Norway

Coordinates: 60°30′N 8°04′E

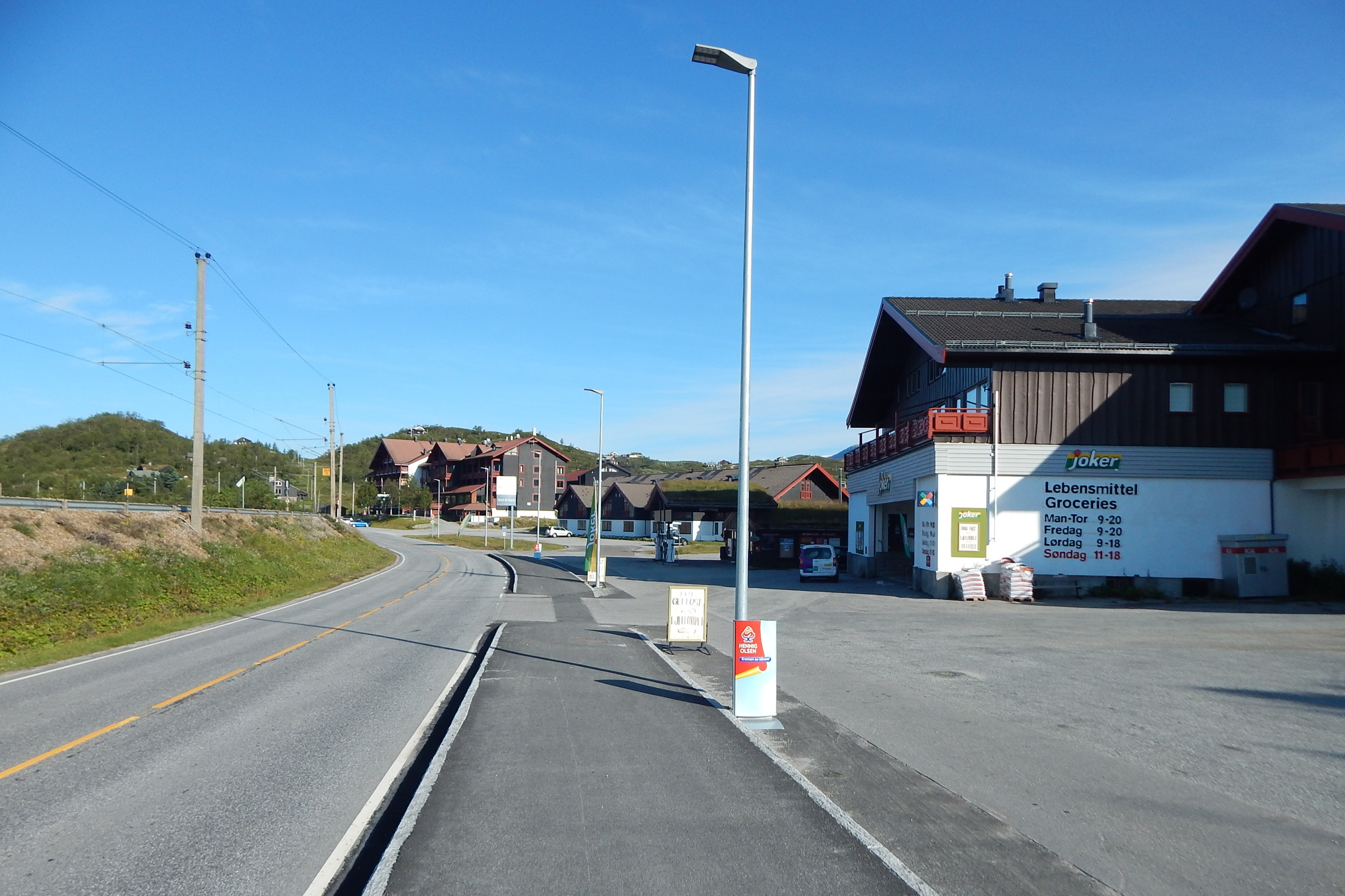
Riksvei 7 through Ustaoset

Ustaoset is a village in Hol municipality, Buskerud, Norway. It is located on Norwegian National Road 7 (Riksvei 7). Ustaoset is situated 990 m (3,250 ft) above sea level and is the finish for the cross country ski event Skarverennet.

Ustaoset first came to prominence in 1909 with the opening of the Bergen Line (Bergensbanen). The rail line between Oslo to Bergen provides year-round access to this high mountain valley. Ustaoset has a rail station on the Bergen Line running between Geilo and Finse, as well as a hotel and mountain resort cabins. Families from both cities built cabins, some now over one hundred years old, from which they could ski in the winters and hike in the summers. Reaching the summit of Folarskardnuten, at 1,933 m (6,342 ft) the highest point in the region, on skis or on foot is a notable achievement.

Because of Norway's strict controls over building and land use, new Ustaoset cabins are difficult if not impossible to build making the rare cabin that comes on the market much in demand. The mountain resort cabins at Ustaoset have a key role in the murder mystery unfolding in the Norwegian detective thriller The Leopard by the Norwegian author Jo Nesbø. Some episodes in the book feature police detectives from cosmopolitan Oslo coming to conduct investigations in the far more primal mountain environment of Ustaoset.

== Ustaoset in winter ==
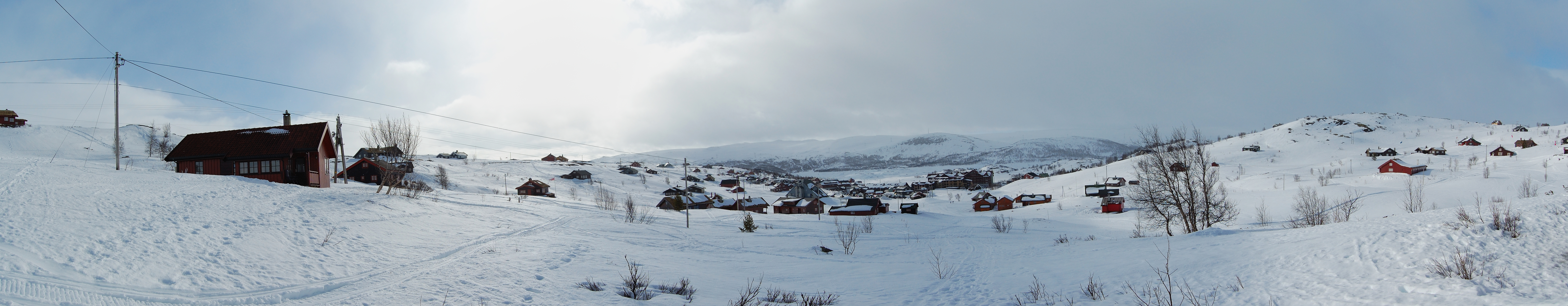

== Related reading ==
- Jo Nesbo (2012) The Leopard: A Harry Hole Novel (Vintage Crime/Black Lizard) ISBN 978-0307743183
