= Eugen Lunde =

Norwegian sailor

Medal record

Men's sailing

Representing Norway

Summer Olympics
Gold medal – first place	1924 Paris	6 metre class

Eugen Peder Lunde (18 May 1887 – 17 June 1963) was a Norwegian sailor who competed in the 1924 Summer Olympics. In 1924 he won the gold medal as a crew member of the Norwegian boat Elisabeth V in the 6 metre class event.

== Personal ==
Eugen Lude was the father of Peder Lunde, the father-in-law of Vibeke Lunde, the grandfather of Peder Lunde Jr. and the great-grand father of Jeanette Lunde — all Olympic sailors for Norway.
