= Skarverennet =

Skarverennet is a cross-country skiing race held in Norway, arranged by the club Geilo IL. The race begins in Finse, and runs along Hallingskarvet, before it finishes at Ustaoset, a total of 38 km. There is an alternative stretch from Haugastøl to Ustaoset, which is 25 km. The race takes place near the end of April, and was first organized in 1974.

== Participation ==
Due to the exposed nature of the race, it takes place in open mountain terrain, the safety of the racers is a priority, and so there is a limit of 14,000 competitors. The racers cross a wide spectrum, many elite cross country skiers and biathletes take part in the race, these are joined with juniors, mature, and recreational skiers, although it is dominated in numbers by Norwegians. The average time to finish is 4–5 hours,

== Winners ==
The 2012 race was the 39th Skarverenn. The men's race was won by Chris Jespersen in a time of 1:31.24 hours, followed by the more famous Petter Northug jr in second with a time of 1:32.29 hours. The women's class was won by Marit Bjørgen
