= Bjørn Bergvall =

Norwegian sailor (born 1939)

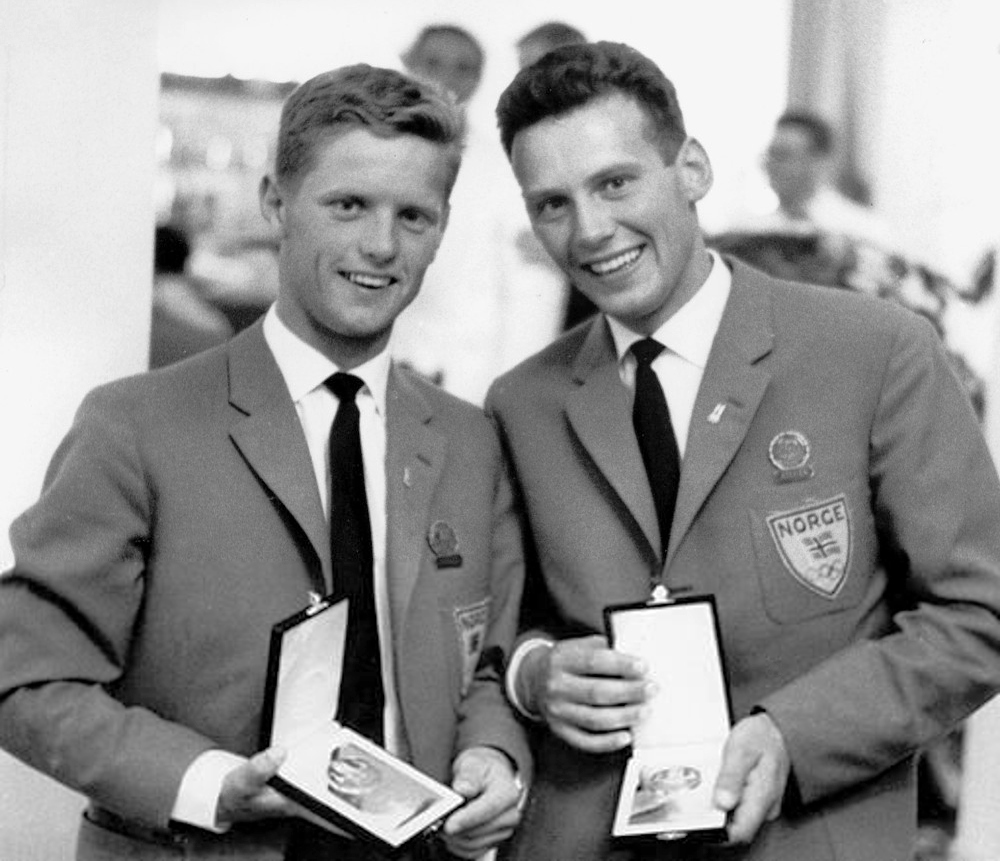
- Lunde and Bergvall (right) in 1960

Personal information
- Born: 13 February 1939 (age 87) Oslo, Norway
- Height: 182 cm (6 ft 0 in)
- Weight: 75 kg (165 lb)

Sailing career
- Sport: Sailing
- Club: Royal Norwegian Yacht Club
Medal record
Representing Norway
Olympic Games
Gold medal – first place	1960 Rome	Flying Dutchman

Bjørn Bergvall (born 13 February 1939) is a retired Norwegian sailor, born in Oslo. He won a gold medal in the Flying Dutchman class at the 1960 Olympics, together with Peder Lunde Jr. He placed fourth at the 1962 Flying Dutchman World Championship.
