= Jeanette Lunde =

Norwegian sportsperson

Jeanette Lunde (born 28 March 1972) is a former Norwegian sportsperson who competed in alpine skiing and sailing. She competed in both the Winter and Summer Olympics, the second Norwegian woman to do so.

== Alpine skiing ==
As an alpine skier she finished eleventh in the downhill discipline and 32nd in the super-G at the 1994 Winter Olympics. She also finished seventeenth in downhill at the 1993 World Championships. Her highest placing in the World Cup was a 66th place in 1993–94. She raced in the World Cup from 1992 to 1995, and finished twice among the top fifteen, with a thirteenth place from Tignes in December 1993 and a fifth place in Garmisch-Partenkirchen in January 1994; both in downhill.

She represented the sports club Stabæk IF, and later Geilo IL. She became Norwegian champion in downhill once.

== Sailing ==
In Lake Louise in December 1995, which would be her last World Cup race, Lunde sustained a knee injury. Another knee injury in 1997 forced her to quit alpine skiing altogether. She took up sailing and participated in the 2000 Summer Olympics in the women's double-handed dinghy (470) event with Carolina Toll. Ranked seventeenth in the world before the contest, they finished sixteenth at the Olympics.

Lunde was the second Norwegian woman who participated in both the Summer and Winter Olympics.

== Personal life ==
Jeanette Lunde hails from Snarøya. She is the daughter of sailor Peder Lunde and alpine skier Aud Lunde, a paternal granddaughter of sailors Peder and Vibeke "Babben" Lunde and great-granddaughter of sailor Eugen Lunde. All these people, except for Aud, were Olympic medallists.

Jeanette Lunde stands at 1.72 m (5 ft 8 in).
