= Dr. Holms Hotel =

Hotel in Geilo, Norway

Coordinates: 62°32′2″N 8°12′25″E

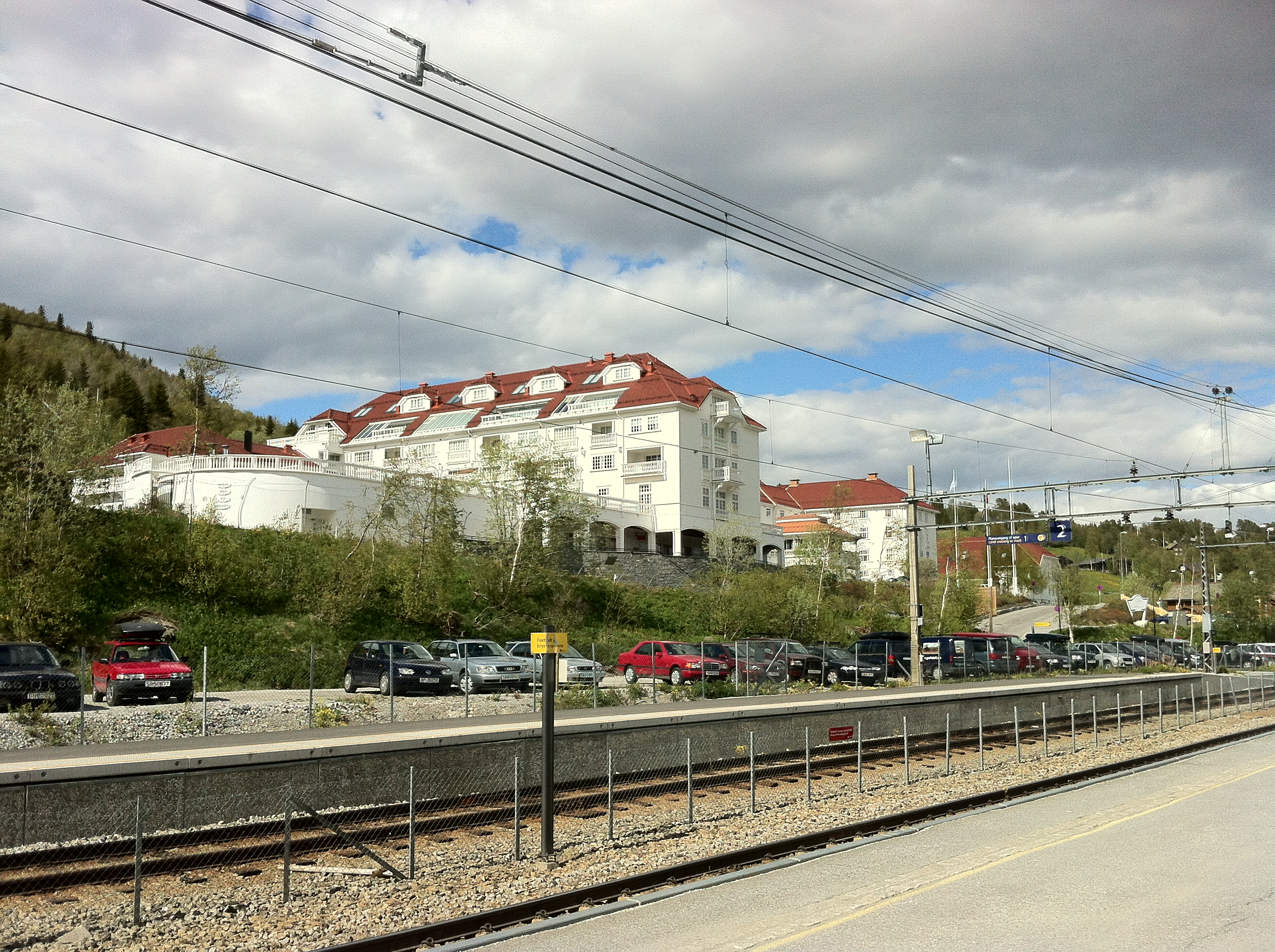
Dr. Holms Hotel above Geilo train station

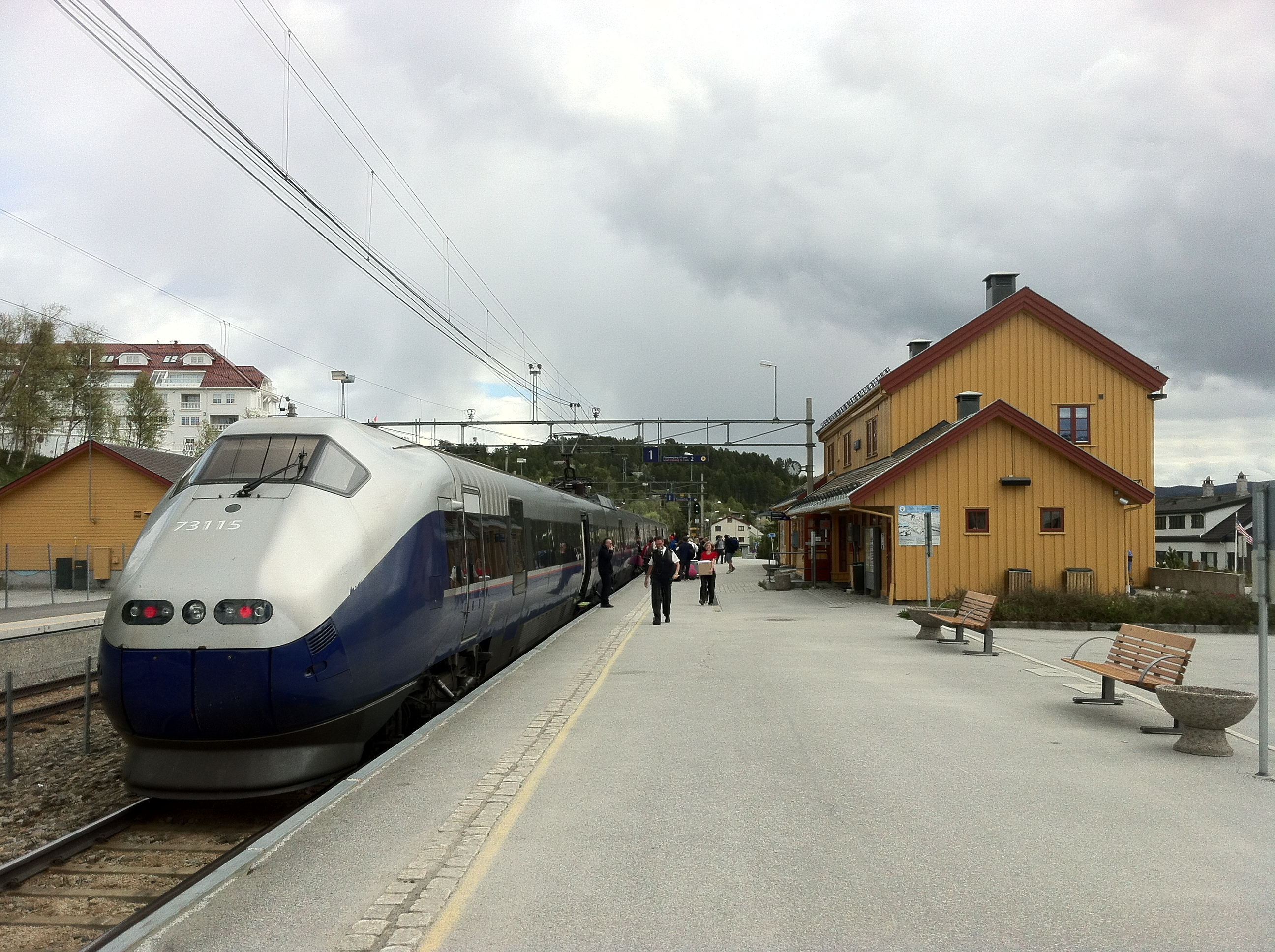
Train at Geilo railway station

Dr. Holms Hotel is a resort hotel in the ski resort town of Geilo in Buskerud county, Norway.

Originally known as Dr. Holms Høifjeldshotel, the hotel was established in 1909, at the same time as the opening of the Bergen Line between Oslo and Bergen. Ingebrigt Christian Holm (1844–1918) established the resort so that his patients could breathe fresh mountain air. Holm was a physician and specialist in respiratory disease. He also started sanatoriums at Vettakollen (Voksenkollen sanatorium) and Larvik (Laurviks Bad). Additionally he was instrumental in establishing Holmenkollen Turisthotel at Holmenkollen in Oslo, now the site of Holmenkollen Hotel. Holm left active management of Dr Holms Hotel during 1916.

Dr. Holms Hotel was taken over by Norsk Hotelcompagnie Ltd. The health retreat soon became a magnet for wealthy families and individuals. It has since become one of the more famous resort hotels in Norway.

The hotel stands at the base of the Slaatta Skisenter. It is roughly a ten-minute drive to the Geilolia Skisenter on the other side of the valley. It is a large building with 127 rooms. There are four floors with two indoor swimming pools, a solarium, gymnasium, sauna, boutique, beauty parlour, baby sitting services, and laundry facilities. The hotel is currently being expanded to add 7,000 square metres of floor space, extra parking, a new serving area, an improved spa, seminar and meeting areas, a bowling alley, and apartments for sale.

== Gallery ==
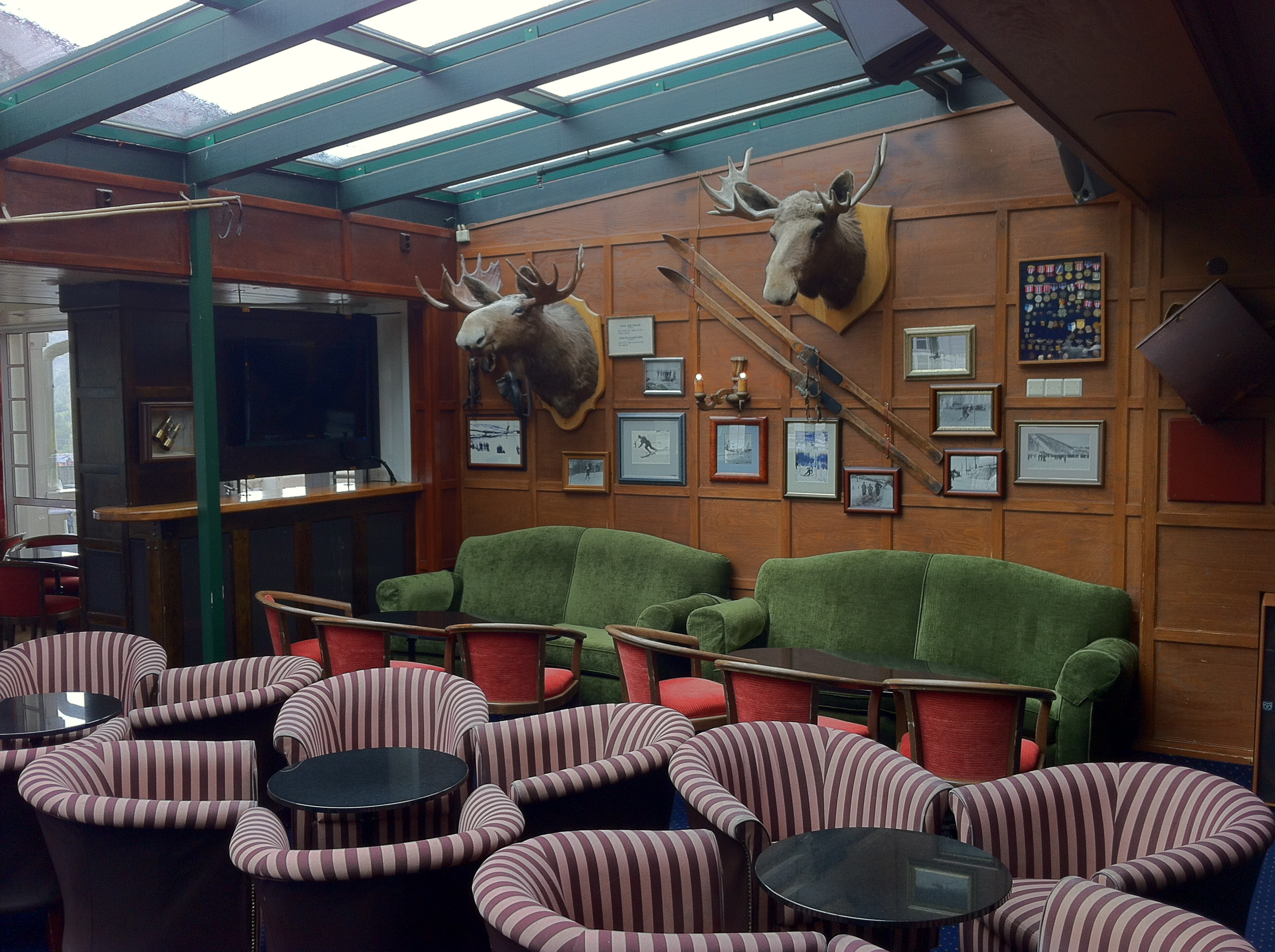
Lounge

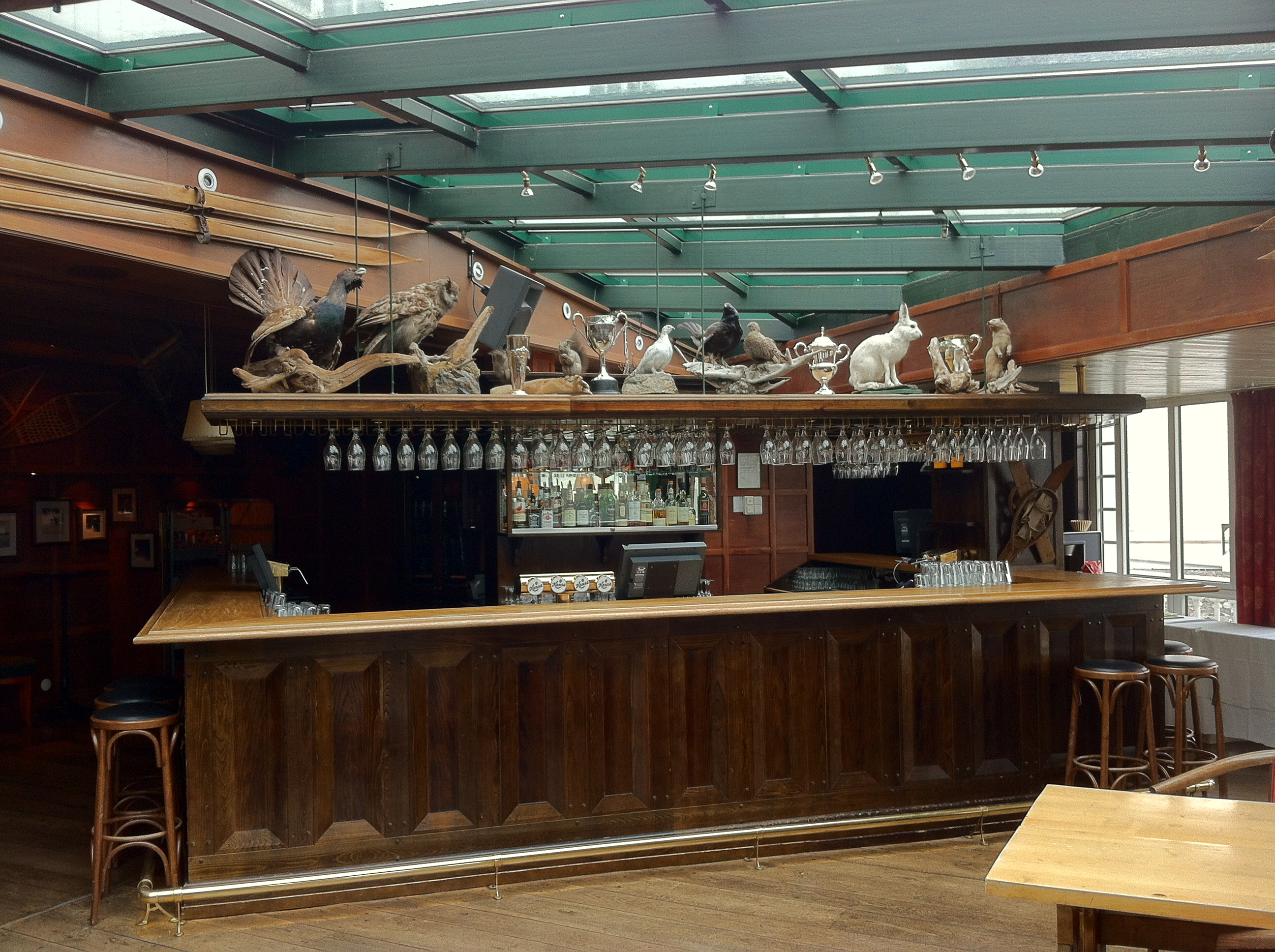
Bar

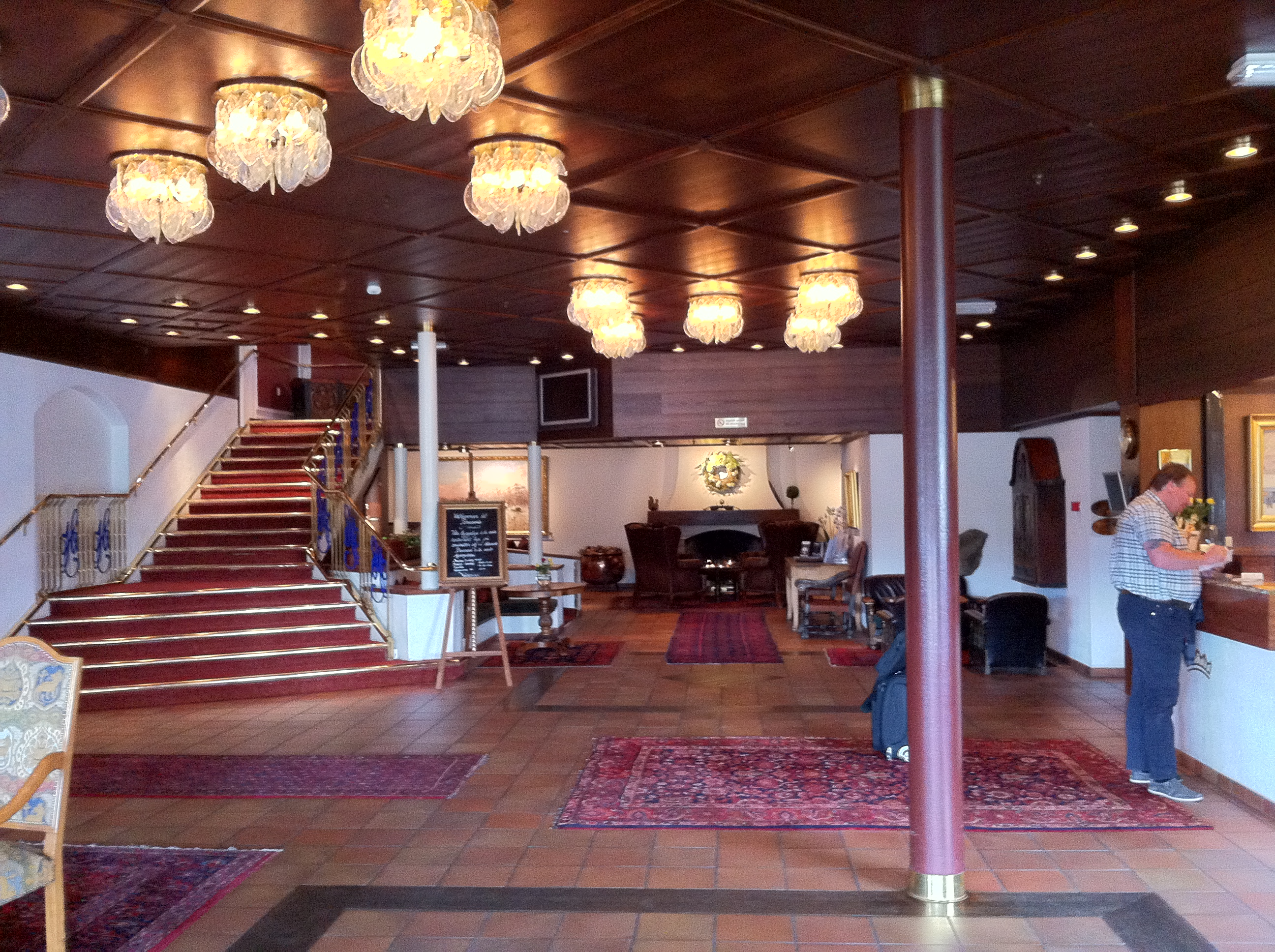
Reception area

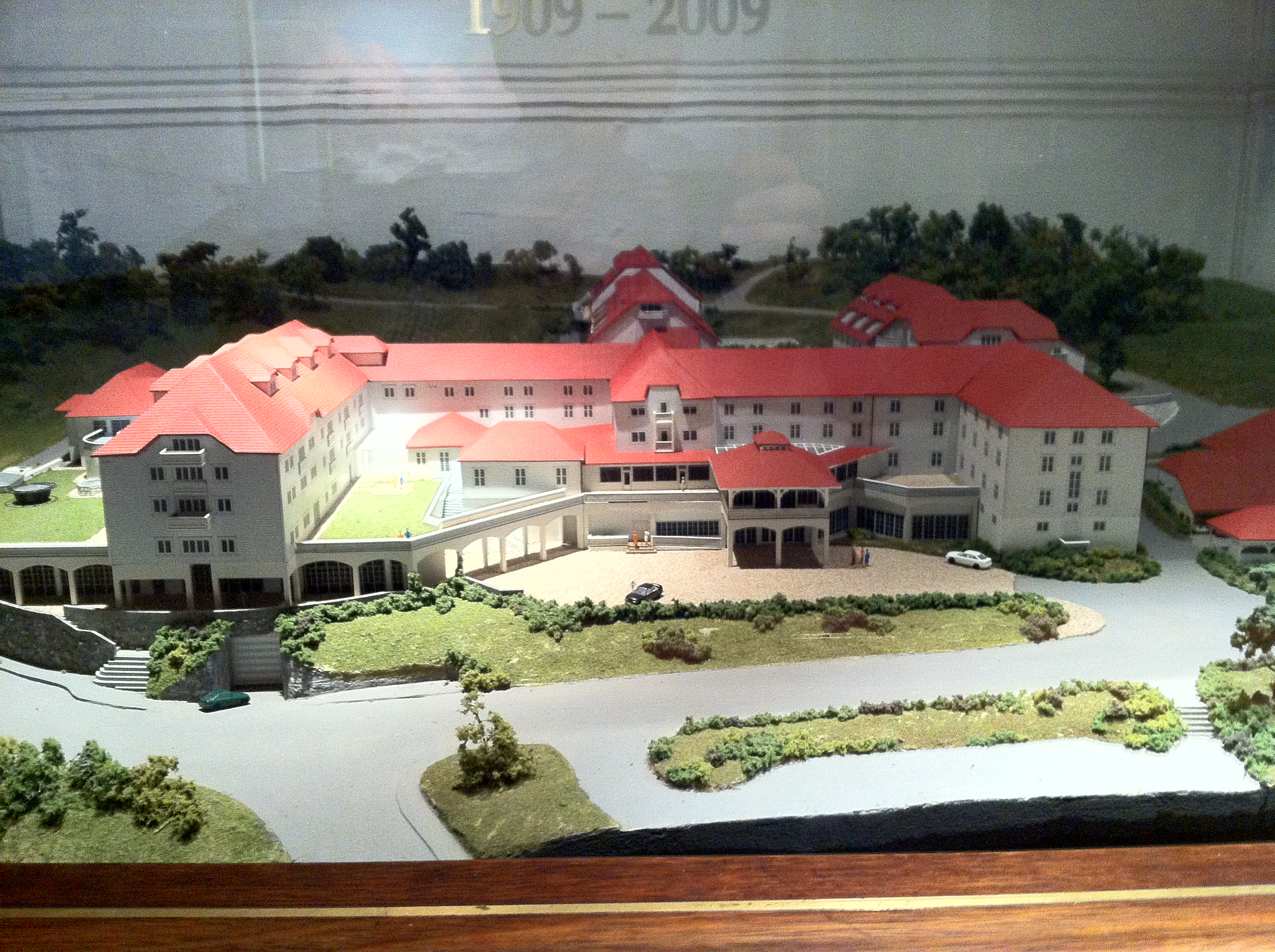
Model of the hotel
