= Peder Lunde Jr. =

Norwegian sailor

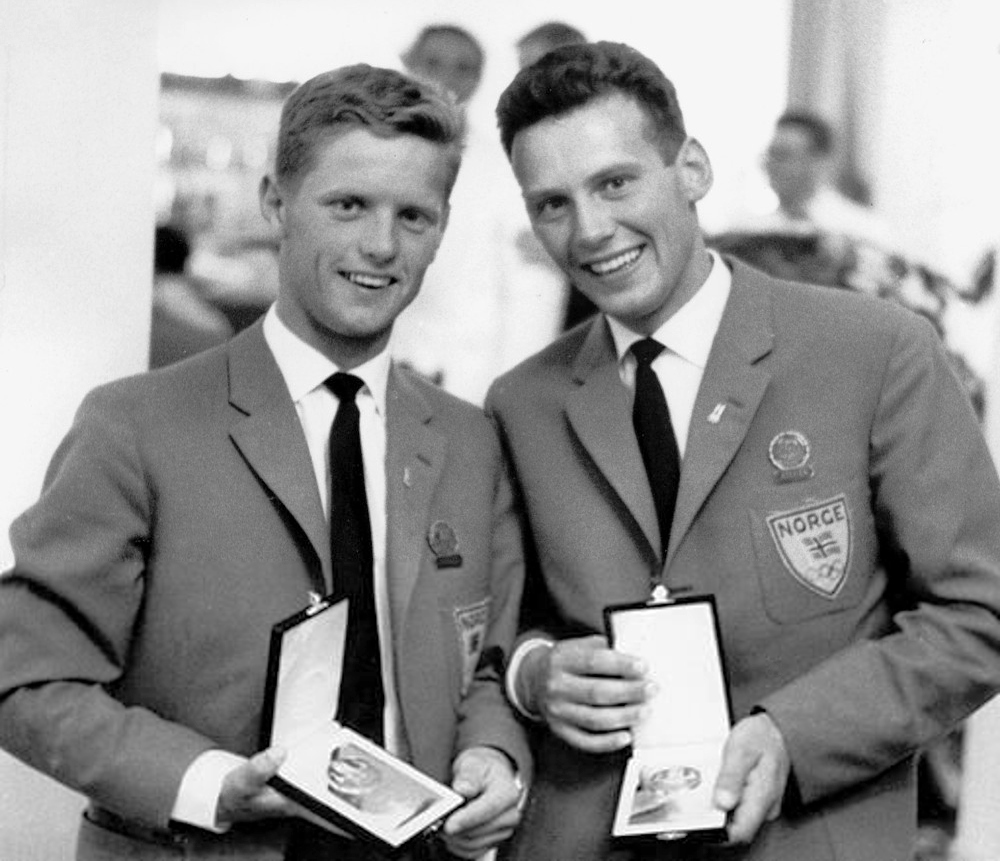
- Lunde (left) and Bergvall in 1960

Personal information
- Born: 9 February 1942 (age 84) Oslo, Norway
- Height: 176 cm (5 ft 9 in)
- Weight: 80 kg (176 lb)

Sailing career
- Sport: Sailing
- Club: Royal Norwegian Yacht Club
Medal record
Sailing
Representing Norway
Olympic Games
Gold medal – first place	1960 Rome	Flying Dutchman
Silver medal – second place	1968 Mexico City	Star class

Peder Lunde Jr. (born 9 February 1942) is a retired Norwegian sailor who competed in the 1960, 1968, 1972 and 1976 Olympics. In 1960, he won a gold medal in the Flying Dutchman class, together with Bjørn Bergvall. Eight years later, he earned a silver medal in the Star class, together with Per Olav Wiken. He placed sixth in the same event in 1972, and 16th in 1976 in the three-person keelboat. In 1981-82, he was a crewmember on the yacht Berge Viking in the Whitbread Round the World Yacht Race.

Lunde comes from a sailing family: his parents Peder and Vibeke Lunde together with uncle Børre Falkum-Hansen won a silver medal at the 1952 Summer Olympics, and his grandfather Eugen Lunde became an Olympic champion in 1924. His wife Aud is an Olympic alpine skier, and their daughter Jeanette competed at Olympics both in alpine skiing and sailing.

He resides at Snarøya.
