= Geilo IL =

Norwegian sports club

Logo.

Geilo Idrettslag is a multi-sports club from Geilo, Norway.

Established on 2 December 1917 as Gjeilo SK, it changed its name to Gjeilo IL on 19 May 1918 and later to Geilo IL. It has sections for alpine skiing, freestyle skiing, skiing and biathlon, snowboarding, telemark skiing, football, handball and cycling. It arranges Skarverennet. Well-known club members include alpine skiers Jeanette Lunde and Asle Sjåstad, and snowboarder Joachim Havikhagen.
