= Geilo =

Ski resort town in Hol Municipality, Norway

Coordinates: 60°31′N 8°12′E

Geilo (Norwegian pronunciation: [jæɪ̯luː]) is a centre in the municipality of Hol in Buskerud county, Norway. Geilo is primarily a ski resort town, with around 2,500 inhabitants. It is situated in the valley of Hallingdal, 250 km from Oslo and 260 km from Bergen. The Bergen Line facilitated Geilo's development as the first skiing resort in the country, and it is still one of the largest. It is also known for having some of the most luxurious and expensive holiday cabins in Norway. The center of the town lies at 800 meters above sea level, and its highest point is 1178 meters above sea level.

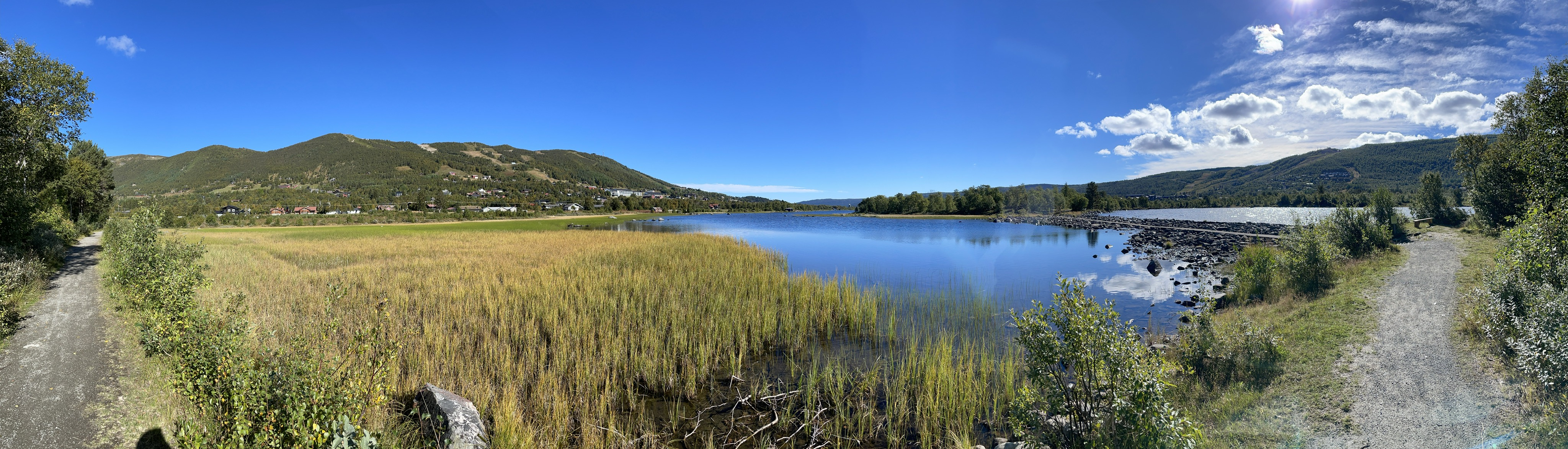
Panorama picture, that shows a spectrum of Geilos nature.

== Etymology ==
The ski resort is named after the old farm Gjeilo. The name is the dative plural of geil f 'fenced road for cattle'.

== Access ==
The Bergen Line (Bergensbanen), the main rail line between Oslo and Bergen, runs right through the centre of town. Geilo train station (Geilo stasjon) with roughly five trains a day connects to either Bergen (to the west) or Oslo (to the east). The closest airport is Geilo Airport, Dagali (24 km away), while the closest airport that accepts international flights is Fagernes Airport. There are also bus routes from Oslo and Bergen as an alternative and the Norwegian National Road 7 ( RV7) also runs through the town.

== Skiing ==
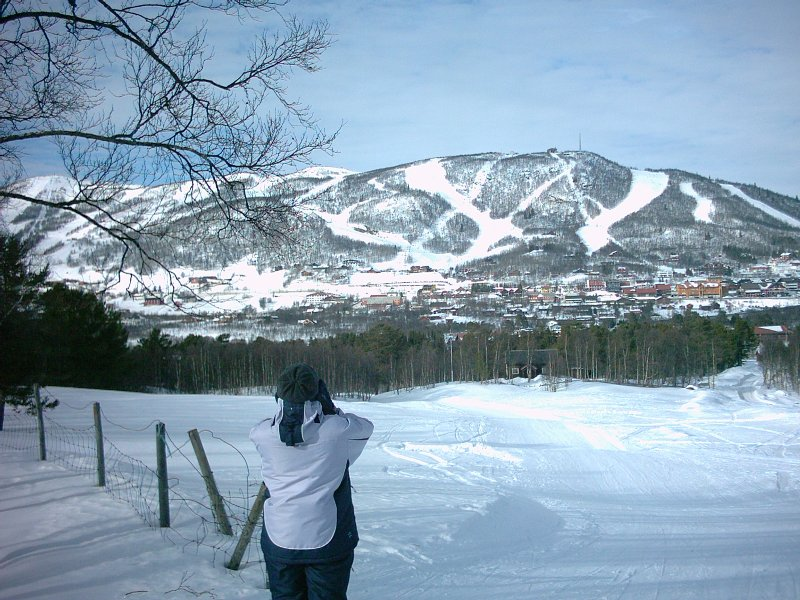
The ski area behind Geilo, as seen from the Geilolia (Vestlia) side of the valley.

The ski season in Geilo is from late October until late April. Geilo has numerous small ski centres that make up one resort, which goes by the name Geilo Skiheiser. This includes slopes on the town side of the valley, Havsdalen over the back side of the mountain, and across the valley at Geilolia (formerly Vestlia) which also connects to the Kikut area. Geilo Skiheiser has 39 slopes covering 33 km accessed by 20 lifts (14 plate, 6 chair). Geilolia skisenter (formerly Vestlia skisenter) tends to have the easier green and blue runs and is where the major ski school that operates in Geilo takes place, whereas Slaatta skisenter has the blue and red runs.

There is also an extensive cross country system in Geilo, offering 220 km of tracks, including 5 km under floodlight. Skiing options include alpine skiing, cross country (XC) skiing, telemarking, snowboarding, dog sledging, toboggan, ski orienteering, and evening skiing most evenings. Another activity that has become very popular of late is 'kiting' (skiing or snowboarding whilst attached to a 'kite' or parasail). Paragliders float down from the top of the slopes with courses run in the area occasionally, mostly in the summer months. Both sides offer a 'big air bag' where all with twin-tip skis or snowboards can jump onto an air bag.

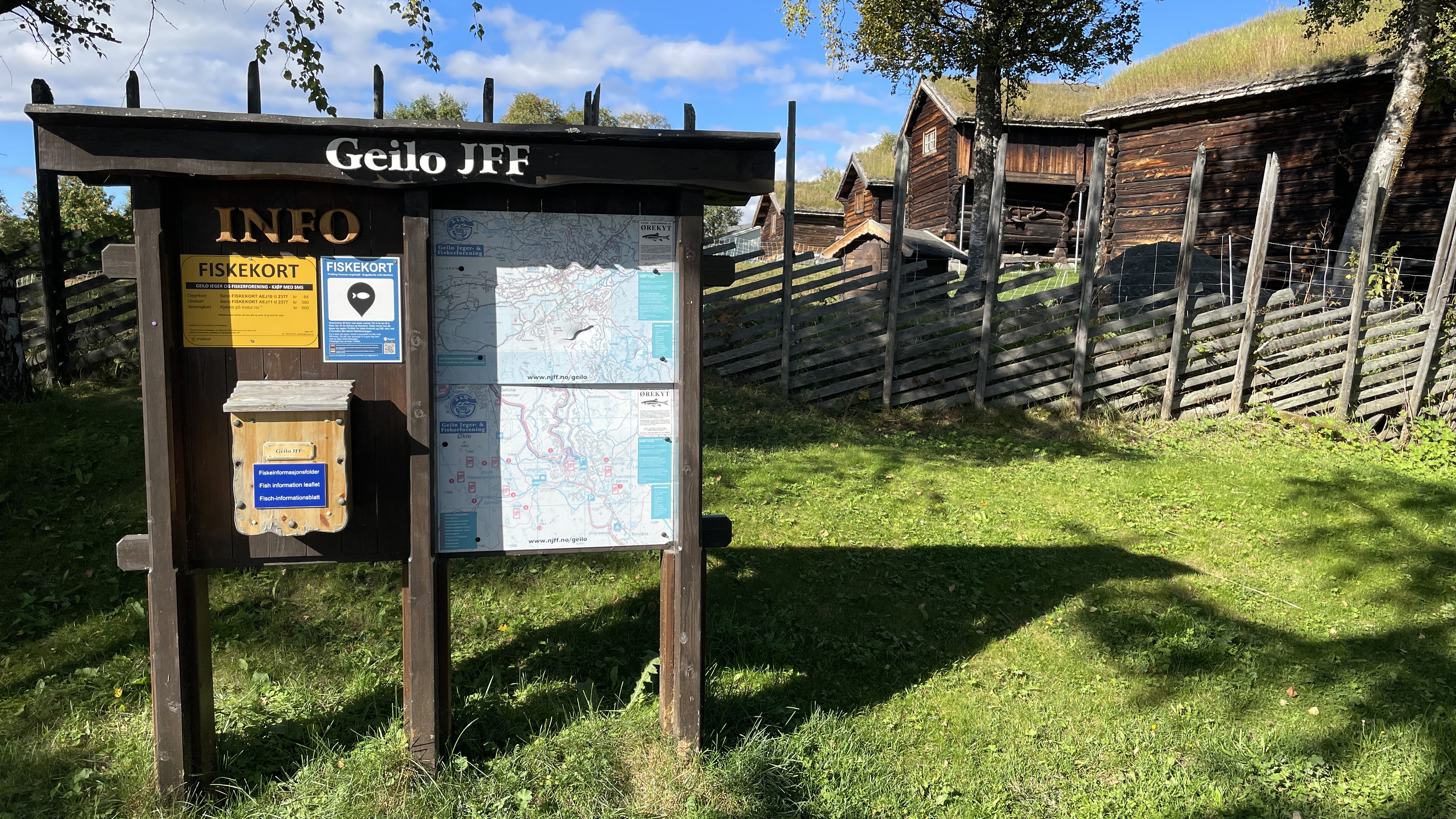
Infostand for visitors at a parkingspace, in front of old norwegian houses.

== Centre of Geilo ==
Geilo is a small town and has few shops and entertainment spots. The sentrum mainly consists of four large wooden buildings, much like a shopping centre/mall. In one is a tourist information, Co-op supermarket, café Capri restaurant, newsagents, undercover parking, and a police station. In the other is an Intersport, supermarket, newsagent, and a special Turkish-Balcan restaurant Trakia.

Down the road there is a small cinema, library, and school. There is also a large sports hall (Geilohallen), which is also the local sports club (Geilo IL). Behind the building is a floodlit prepared cross country track, and a biathlon shooting range. The tourist Centre is located next to Sport 1 and has information about the various group outings and experiences, especially in regards to experiencing the Hardangervidda National Park area, including the glacier at Finse, which is 1,222 metres above sea level. There are a large choice of hotels, including among others Geilo Hotel, Dr Holms Hotel, Bardøla Høyfjellshotell, Hotel Lodge, and Vestlia Resort.

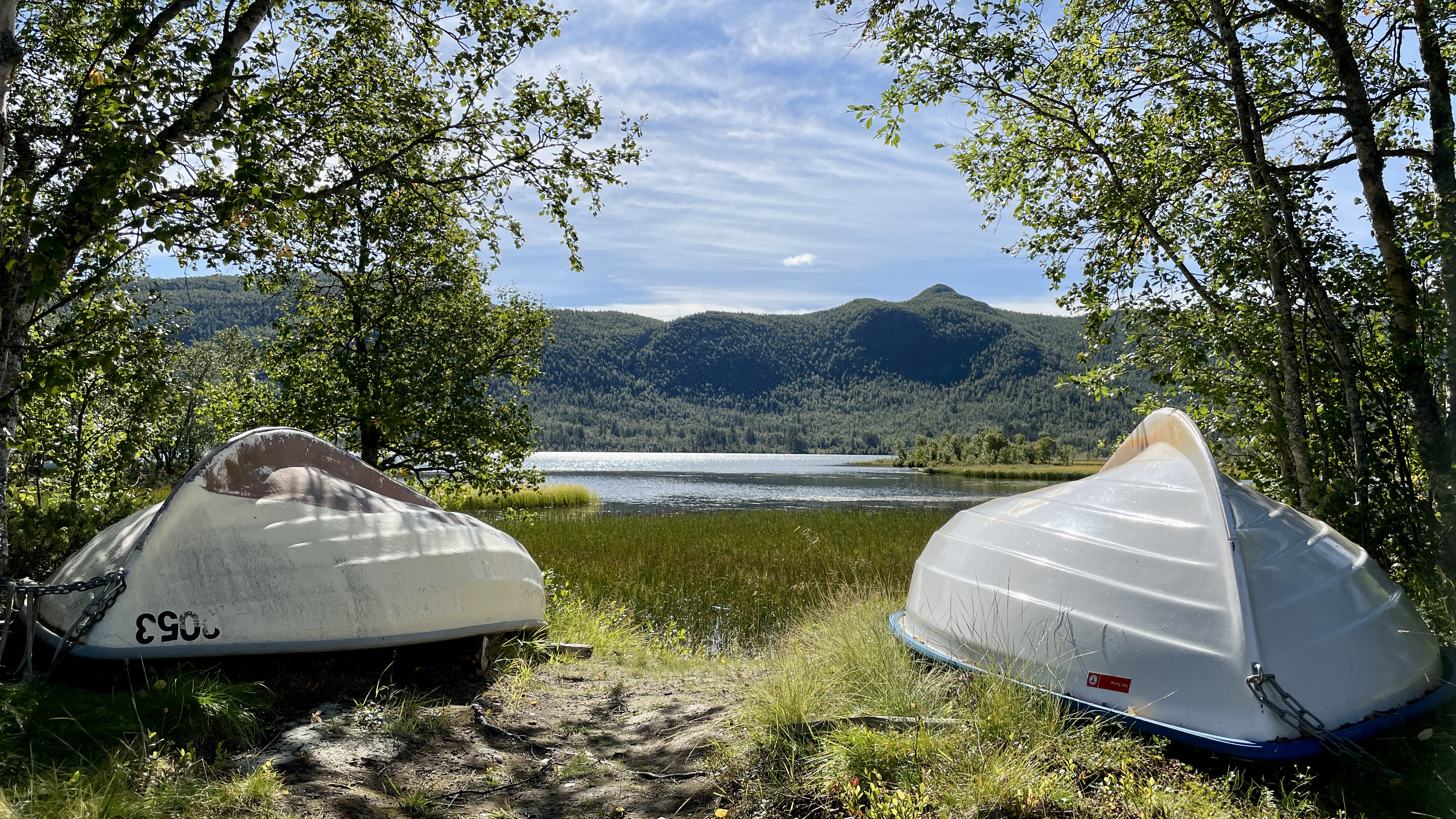
Boats at the Ustedalsfjorden.

== Out of winter season ==
After the winter season, there are other sporting activities available including go carts, paintballing, white water rafting, rallying, golf, tennis, cycling. Two popular activities are hiking on the mountains or mountain biking at the local downhill park or trails through the woods. The Rallarvegen route from Finse to Flåm is extremely popular in the summer months. Geilolia Summer Park offers activities such as downhill biking, canoe hire or a large climbing park with a prepared route up in the trees for people of all ages. Geilo is adjacent to three lakes, Slåttahølen, Vestlefjorden, and Ustedalsfjorden.

== Climate ==
Climate data for Geilo - Oldebråten 1991-2020 (772 m, avg high/low 2007-2025)
Month	Jan	Feb	Mar	Apr	May	Jun	Jul	Aug	Sep	Oct	Nov	Dec	Year
Mean daily maximum °C (°F)	−2.9 (26.8)	−1.4 (29.5)	1.7 (35.1)	5.4 (41.7)	10.8 (51.4)	16.3 (61.3)	18.3 (64.9)	16.5 (61.7)	12.6 (54.7)	6.4 (43.5)	1 (34)	−2.1 (28.2)	6.9 (44.4)
Daily mean °C (°F)	−6.2 (20.8)	−6 (21)	−3.6 (25.5)	0.5 (32.9)	5.5 (41.9)	9.9 (49.8)	12.4 (54.3)	11.1 (52.0)	7.4 (45.3)	1.9 (35.4)	−2.8 (27.0)	−5.6 (21.9)	2.0 (35.7)
Mean daily minimum °C (°F)	−11.2 (11.8)	−10.6 (12.9)	−7.3 (18.9)	−3.8 (25.2)	1 (34)	5.2 (41.4)	7.4 (45.3)	6.4 (43.5)	3.7 (38.7)	−0.7 (30.7)	−5.7 (21.7)	−9.9 (14.2)	−2.1 (28.2)
Average precipitation mm (inches)	64 (2.5)	42 (1.7)	40 (1.6)	37 (1.5)	45 (1.8)	62 (2.4)	80 (3.1)	82 (3.2)	61 (2.4)	66 (2.6)	63 (2.5)	56 (2.2)	698 (27.5)
Source 1: seklima.no = eklima>
Source 2: yr.no (precipitation)

Climate data for Geilo-Geilostølen (1966–2005), Norway
Month	Jan	Feb	Mar	Apr	May	Jun	Jul	Aug	Sep	Oct	Nov	Dec	Year
Mean daily maximum °C (°F)	−4.5 (23.9)	−3.5 (25.7)	−0.8 (30.6)	2.9 (37.2)	9.5 (49.1)	15.1 (59.2)	16.6 (61.9)	15.6 (60.1)	10.2 (50.4)	5.2 (41.4)	−0.5 (31.1)	−2.8 (27.0)	5.3 (41.5)
Daily mean °C (°F)	−8.2 (17.2)	−7.5 (18.5)	−5.2 (22.6)	−1.1 (30.0)	4.7 (40.5)	9.8 (49.6)	11.2 (52.2)	10.2 (50.4)	5.8 (42.4)	2.1 (35.8)	−3.6 (25.5)	−6.5 (20.3)	1.0 (33.8)
Mean daily minimum °C (°F)	−11.4 (11.5)	−11.3 (11.7)	−8.8 (16.2)	−5.1 (22.8)	0.3 (32.5)	4.4 (39.9)	6.1 (43.0)	5.5 (41.9)	2.2 (36.0)	−1.2 (29.8)	−6.8 (19.8)	−9.6 (14.7)	−3.0 (26.7)
Average precipitation mm (inches)	52 (2.0)	36 (1.4)	47 (1.9)	35 (1.4)	50 (2.0)	61 (2.4)	72 (2.8)	72 (2.8)	68 (2.7)	78 (3.1)	70 (2.8)	59 (2.3)	700 (27.6)

== Trivia ==
- Geilo Hotel was founded in 1880
- Øyo Hotell was founded in 1909
- Dr. Holms Hotel was founded in 1909
- Haugen Hotell was founded 1914
- The 1980 Winter Paralympics were held at Geilo
- Queen Sonja of Norway gained her ski instructors certificate in Geilo

== Gallery ==
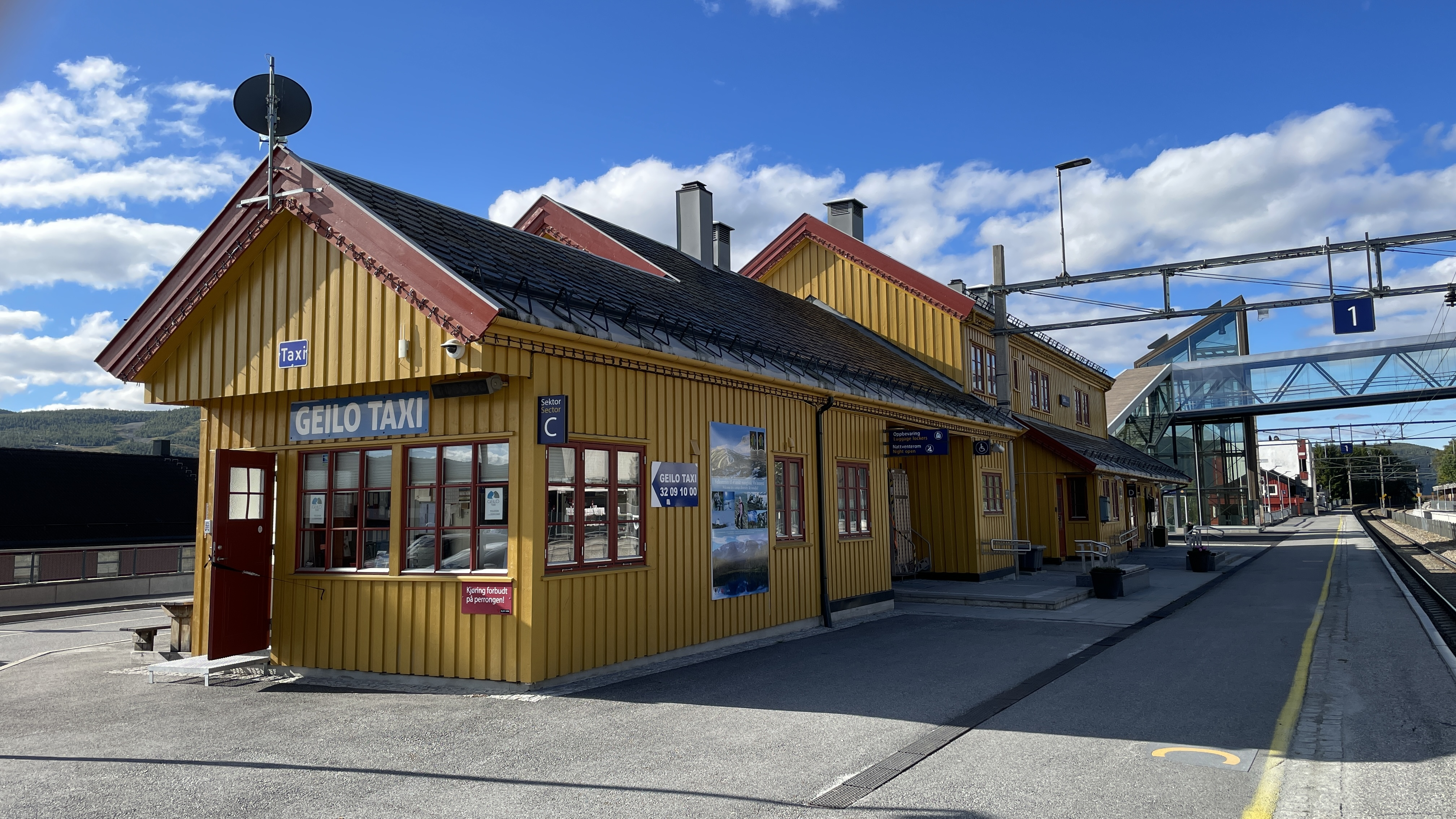
Geilo Train Station

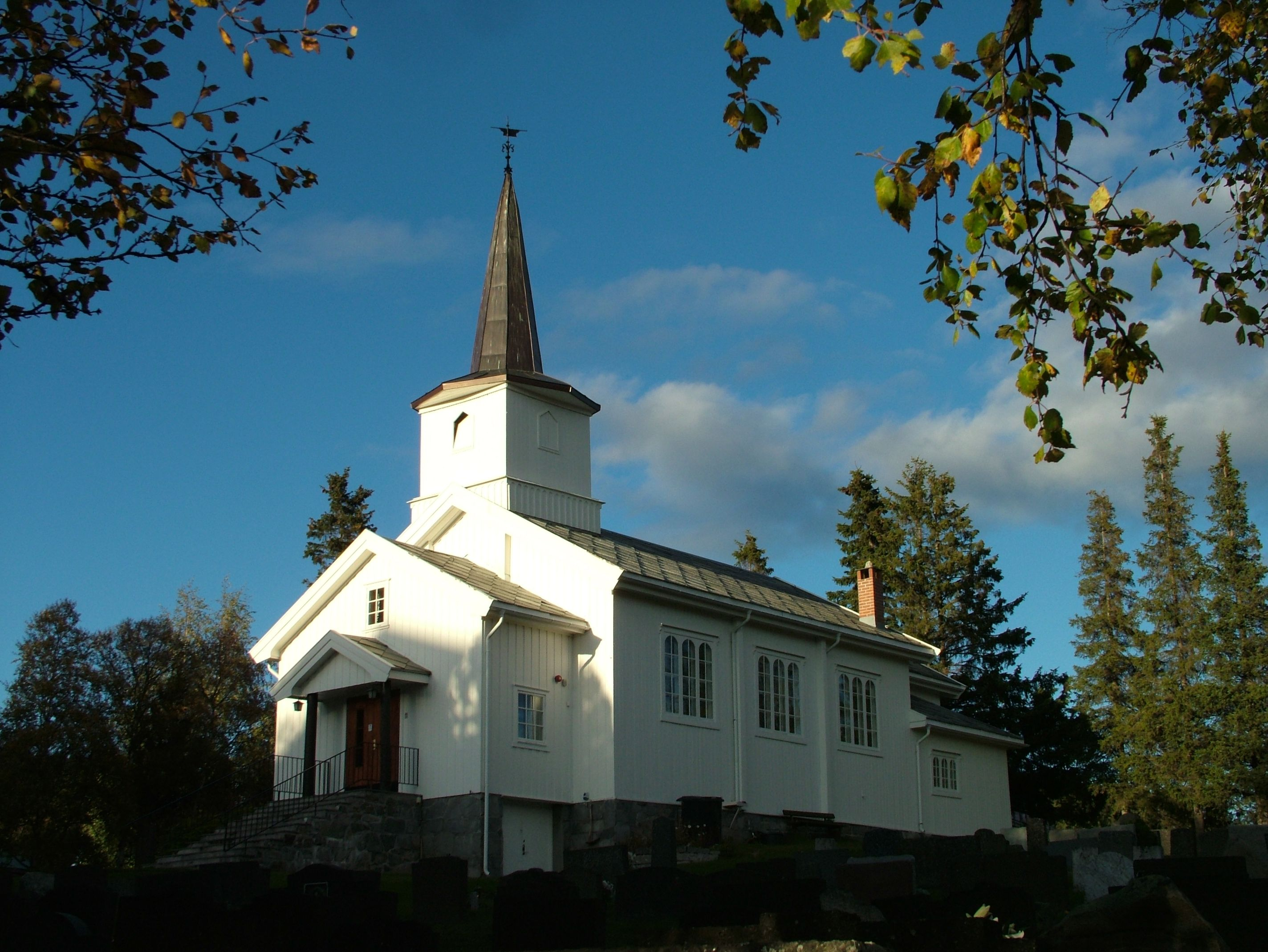
Geilo Church

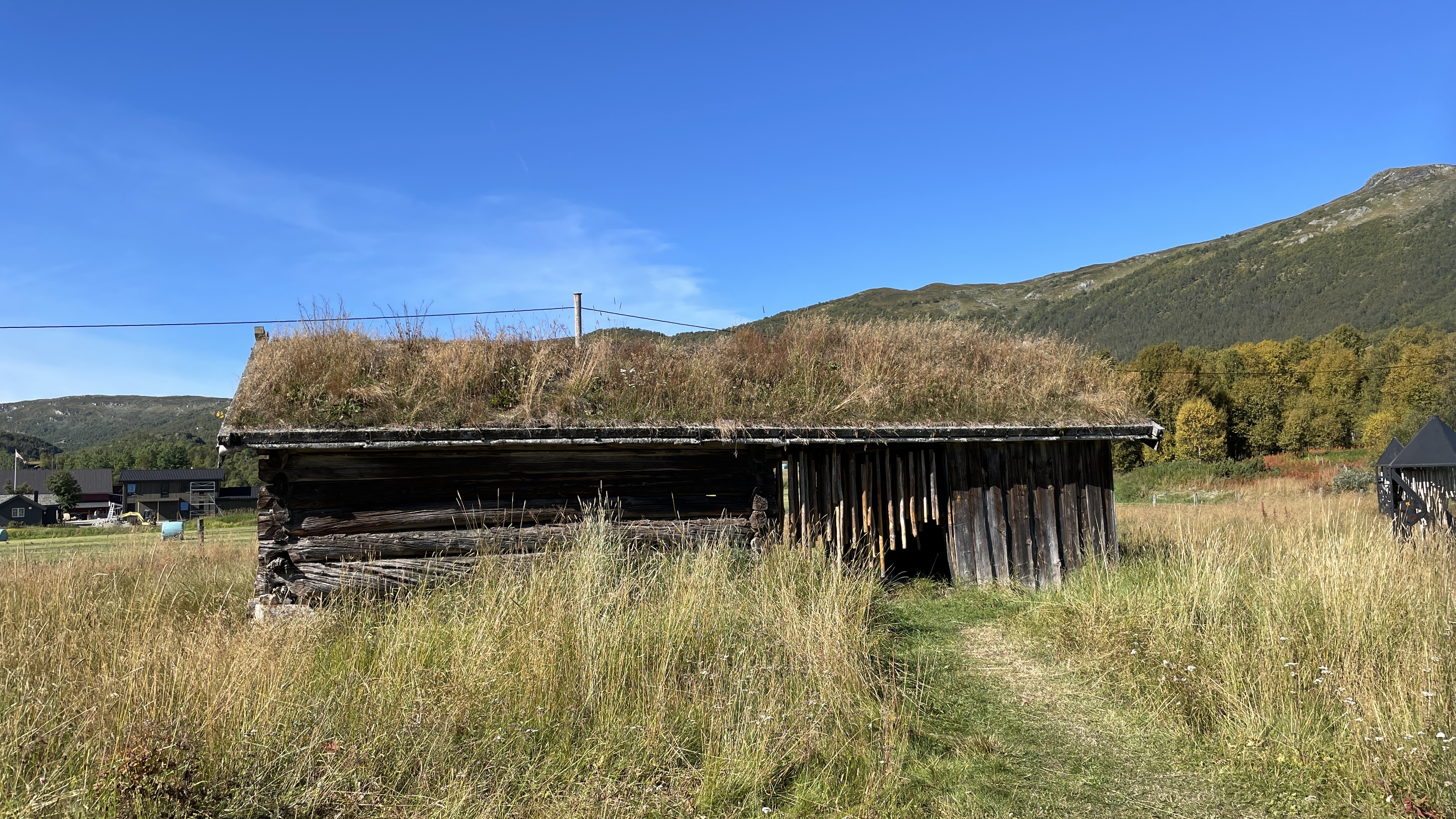
Geilo Vikinghuset

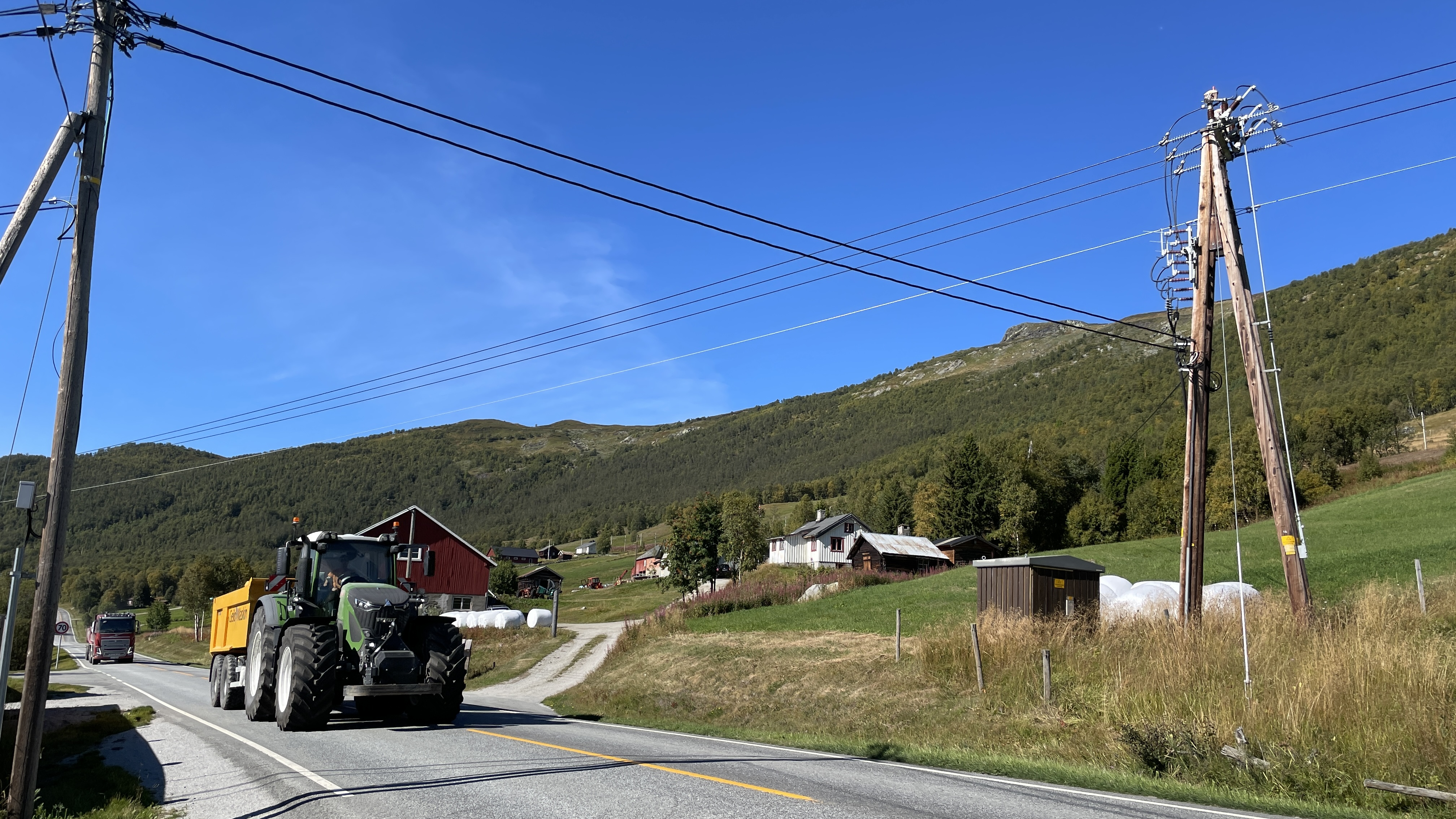
Geilo street scene
